= Golden Globe Award for Best Supporting Actress – Motion Picture =

Award category recognising excellence by an actress in a supporting performance

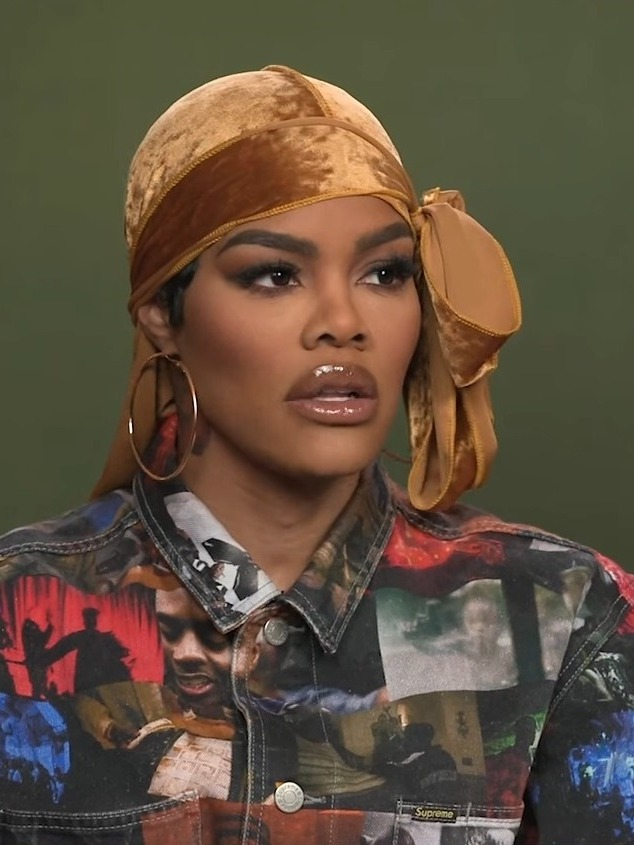
- The 2025 recipient: Teyana Taylor
- Awarded for: Best Performance by an Actress in a Supporting Role in a Motion Picture
- Country: United States
- Presented by: Dick Clark Productions
- First award: 1944 (for performances in films released in 1943)
- Currently held by: Teyana Taylor for One Battle After Another (2025)
- Website: goldenglobes.com

The Golden Globe Award for Best Supporting Actress – Motion Picture is a Golden Globe Award that was first awarded by the Hollywood Foreign Press Association in 1944 for a performance in a motion picture released in the previous year.

The formal title has varied since its inception; since 2005, the award has officially been called "Best Performance by an Actress in a Supporting Role in a Motion Picture".

== Winners and nominees ==
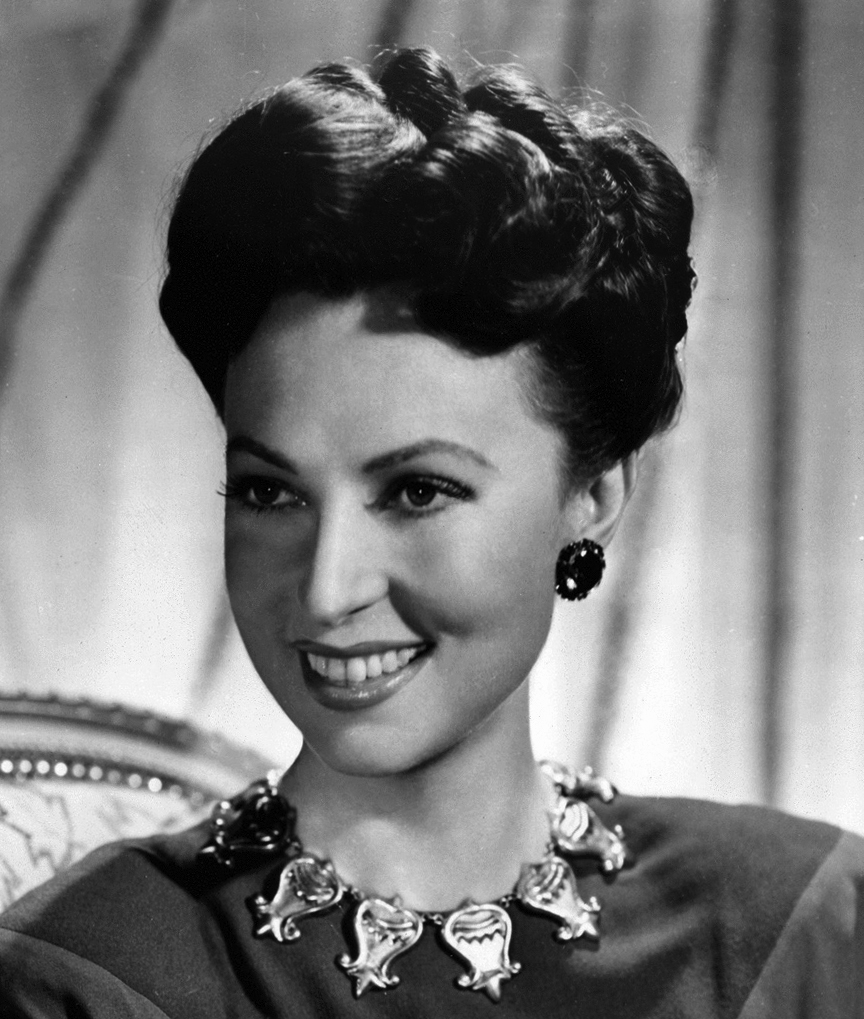
Agnes Moorehead won twice for Mrs. Parkington (1944) and Hush...Hush, Sweet Charlotte (1963)

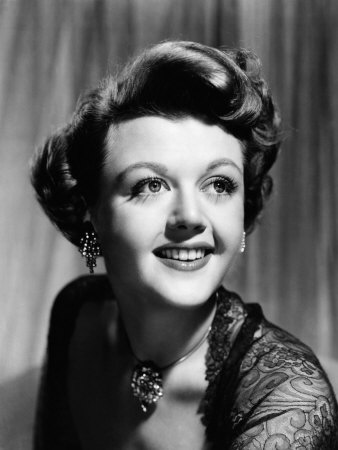
Angela Lansbury won twice for The Picture of Dorian Gray (1945) and The Manchurian Candidate (1962)

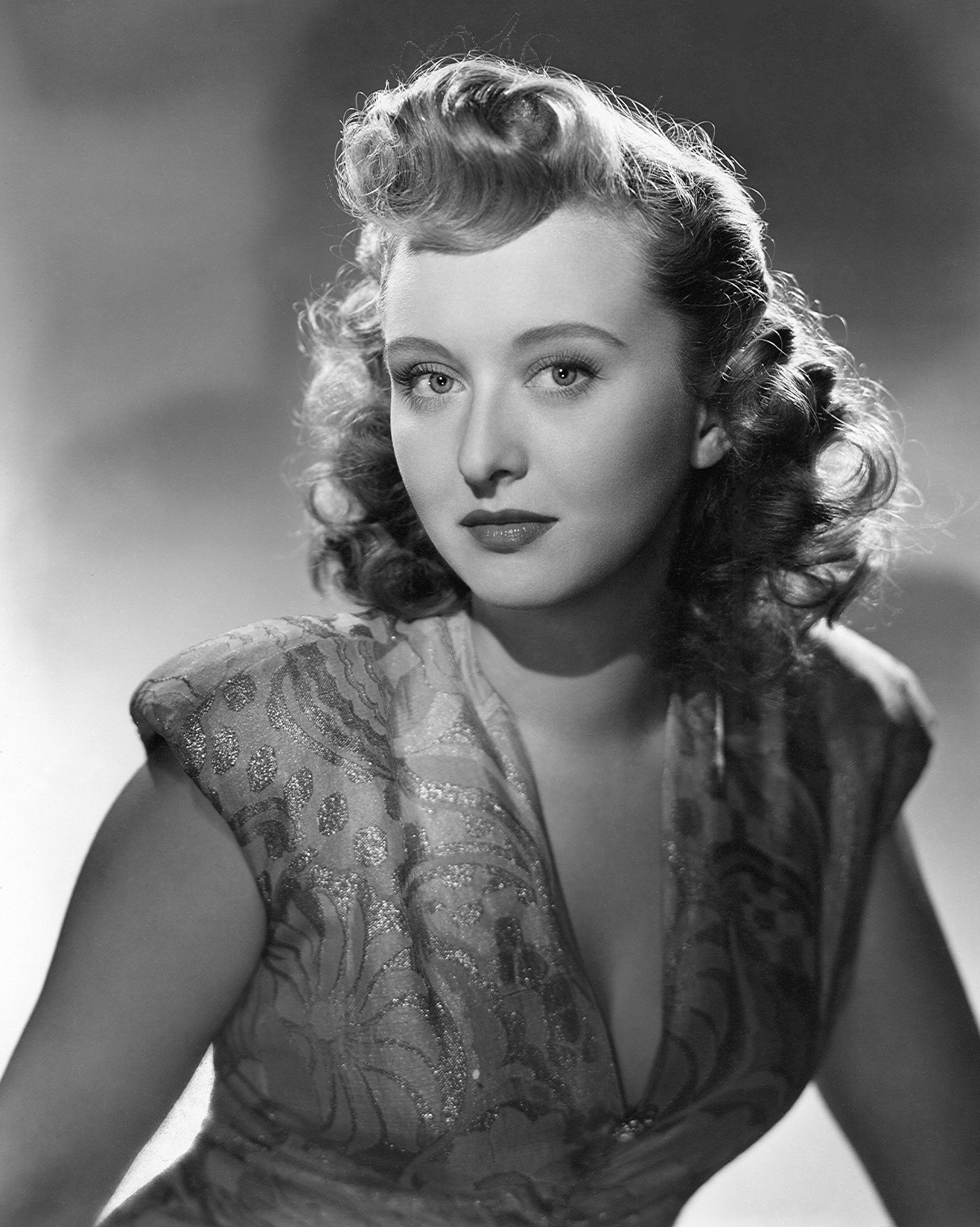
Celeste Holm won for Gentleman's Agreement (1947)

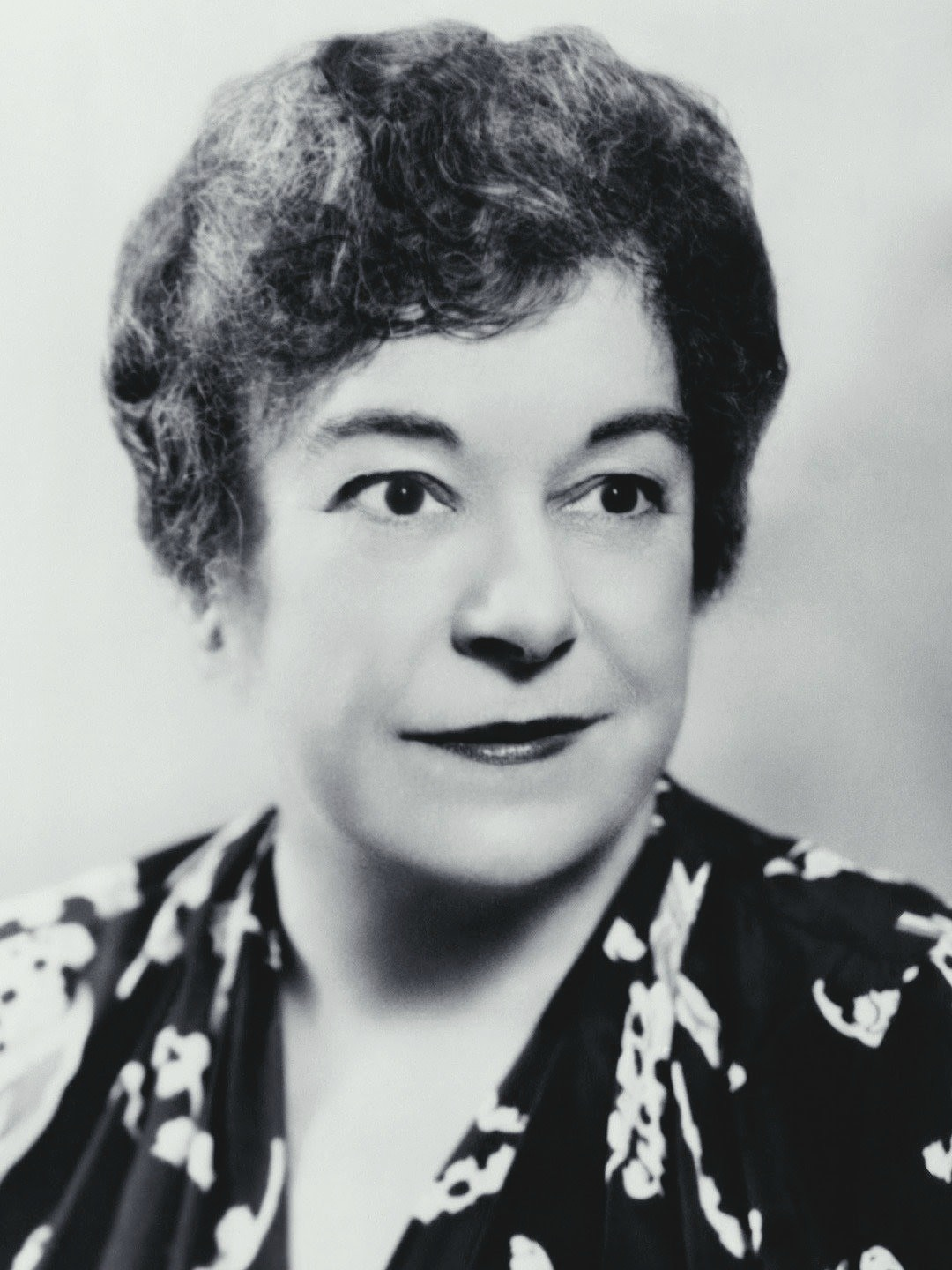
Josephine Hull won for Harvey (1950)

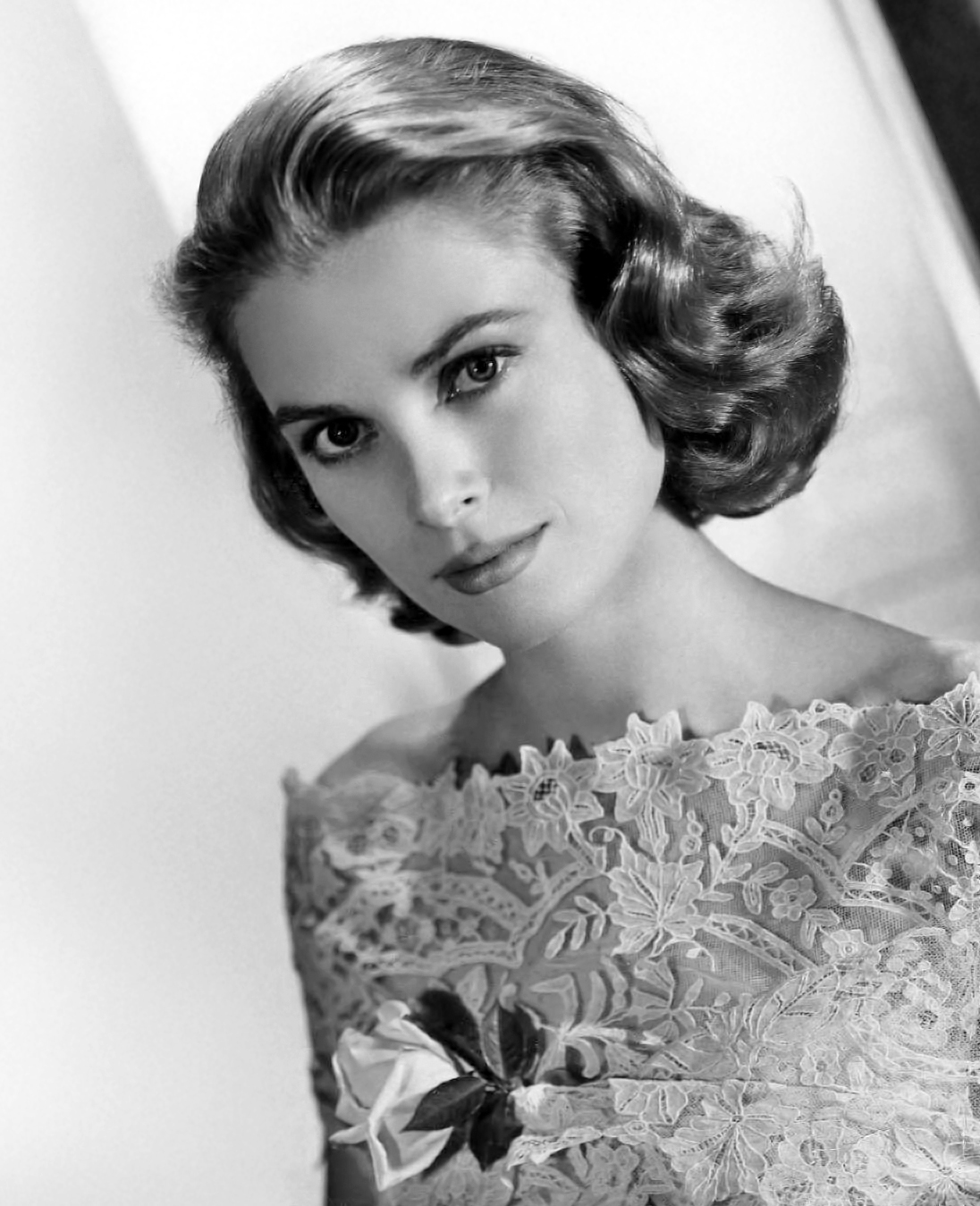
Grace Kelly won for Mogambo (1953)

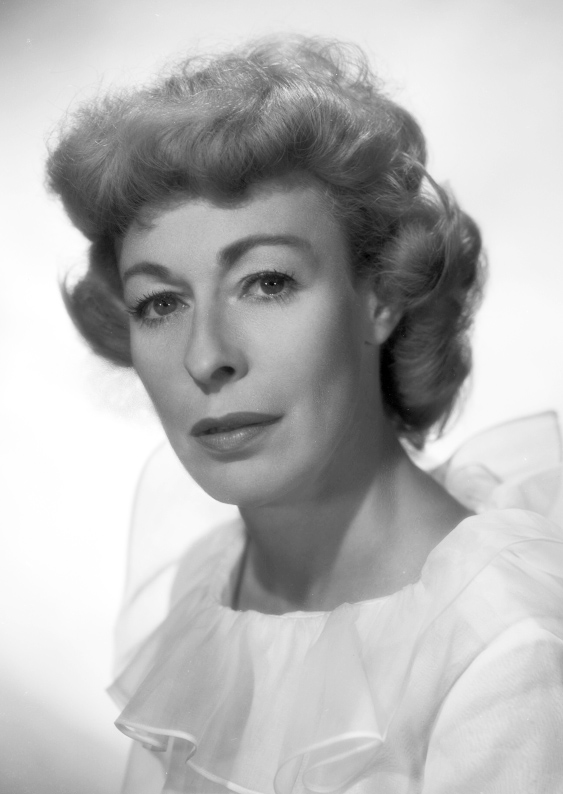
Eileen Heckart won for The Bad Seed (1956)

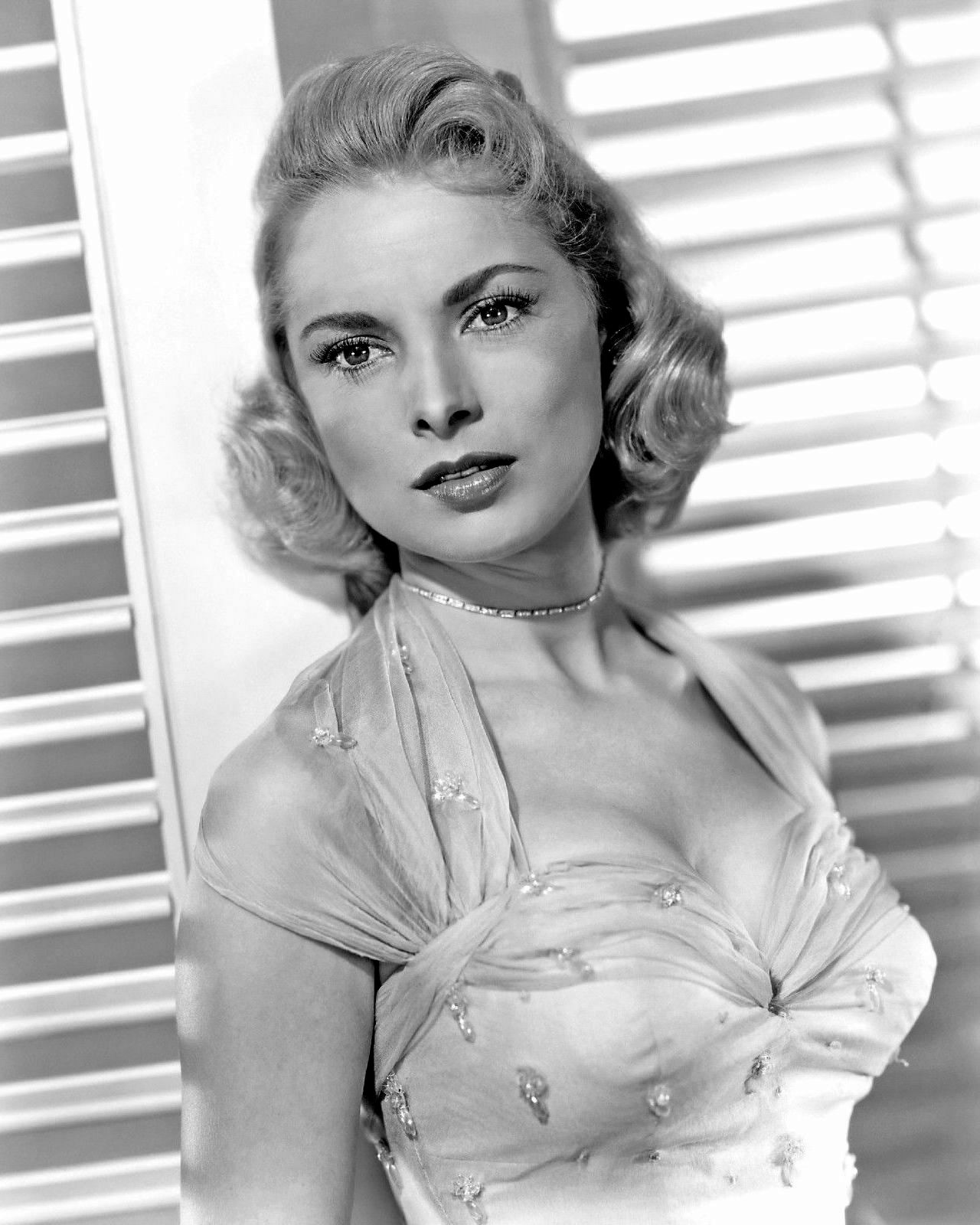
Janet Leigh won for Psycho (1960)

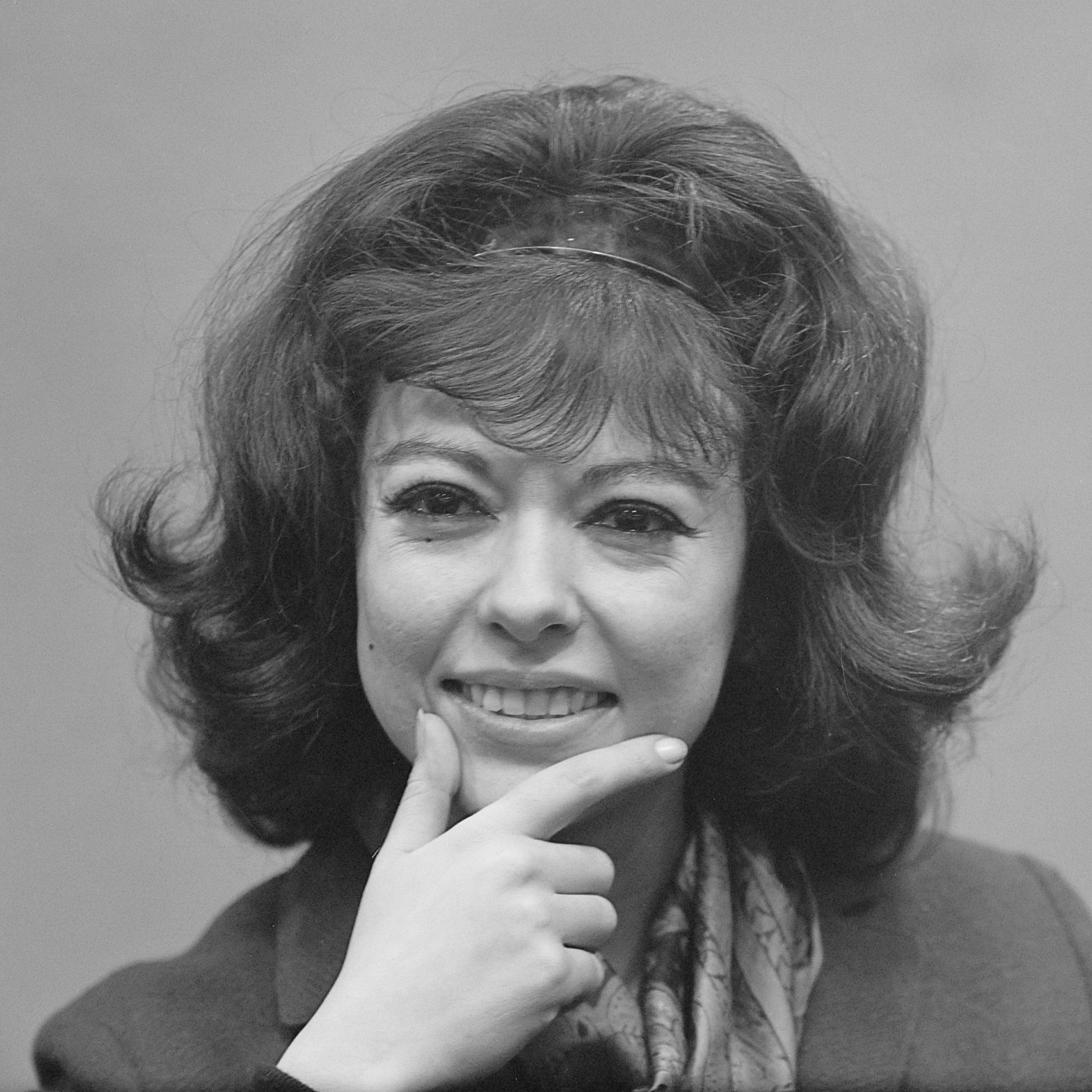
Rita Moreno won for West Side Story (1960)

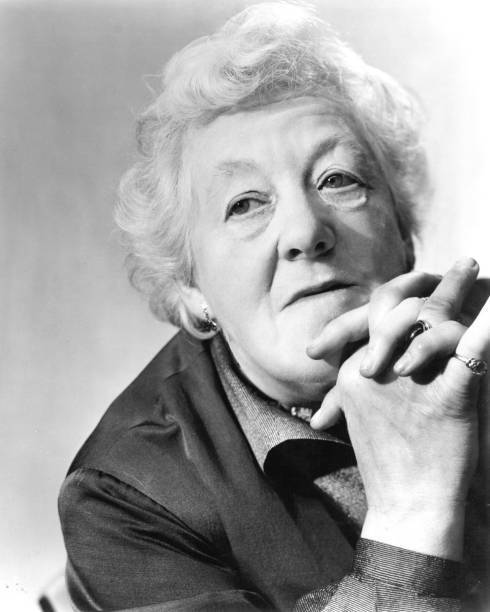
Dame Margaret Rutherford won for The V.I.P.s (1963)

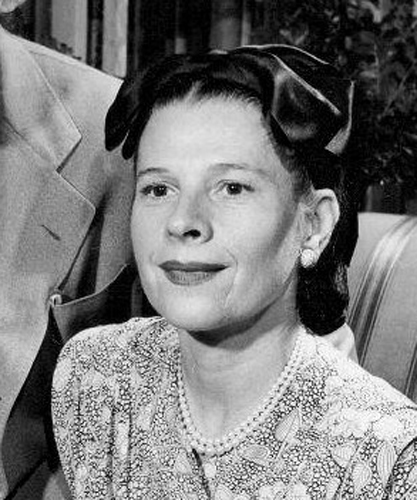
Ruth Gordon won for twice for Inside Daisy Clover (1956) and Rosemary's Baby (1968)

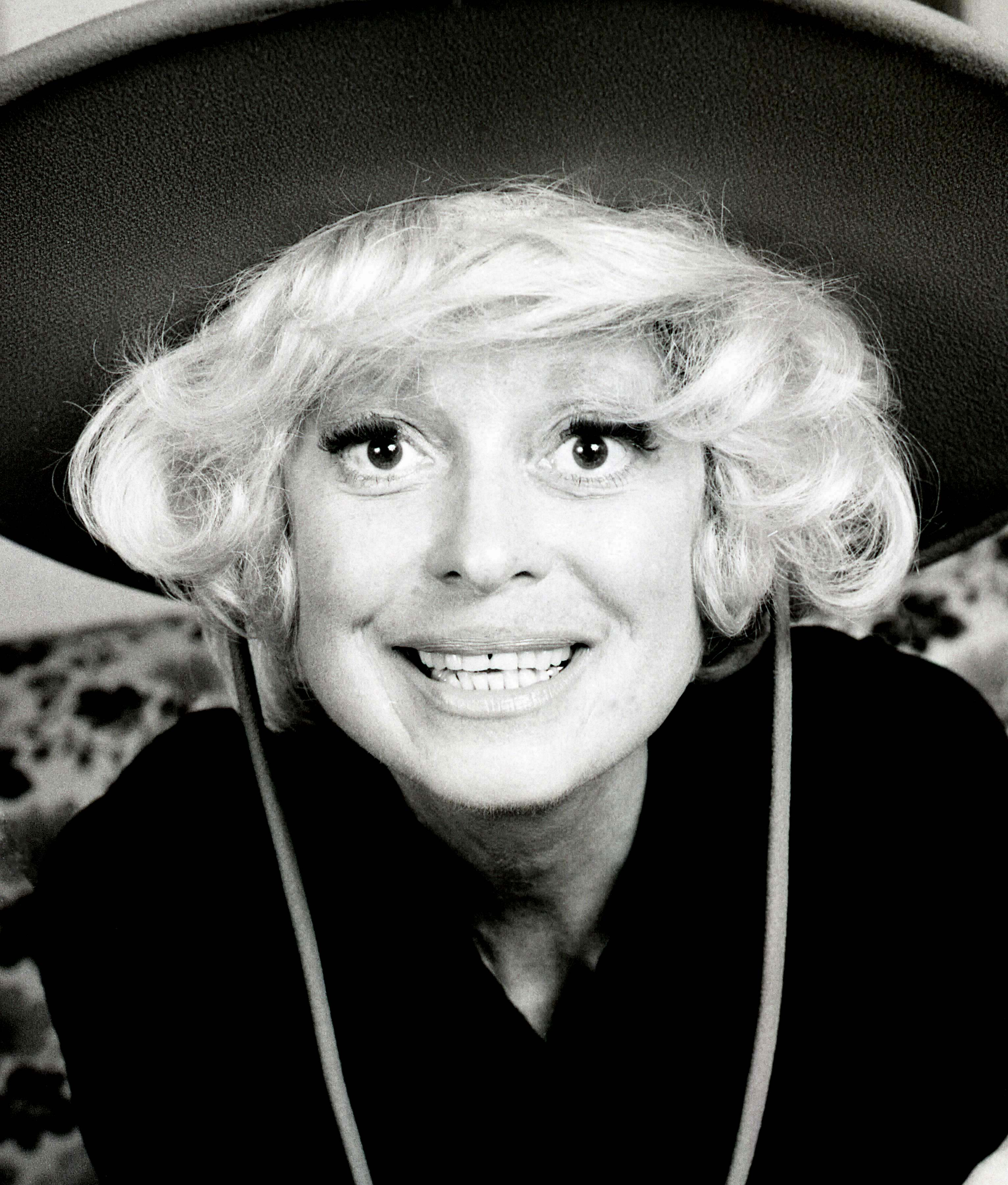
Carol Channing won for Thoroughly Modern Millie (1967)

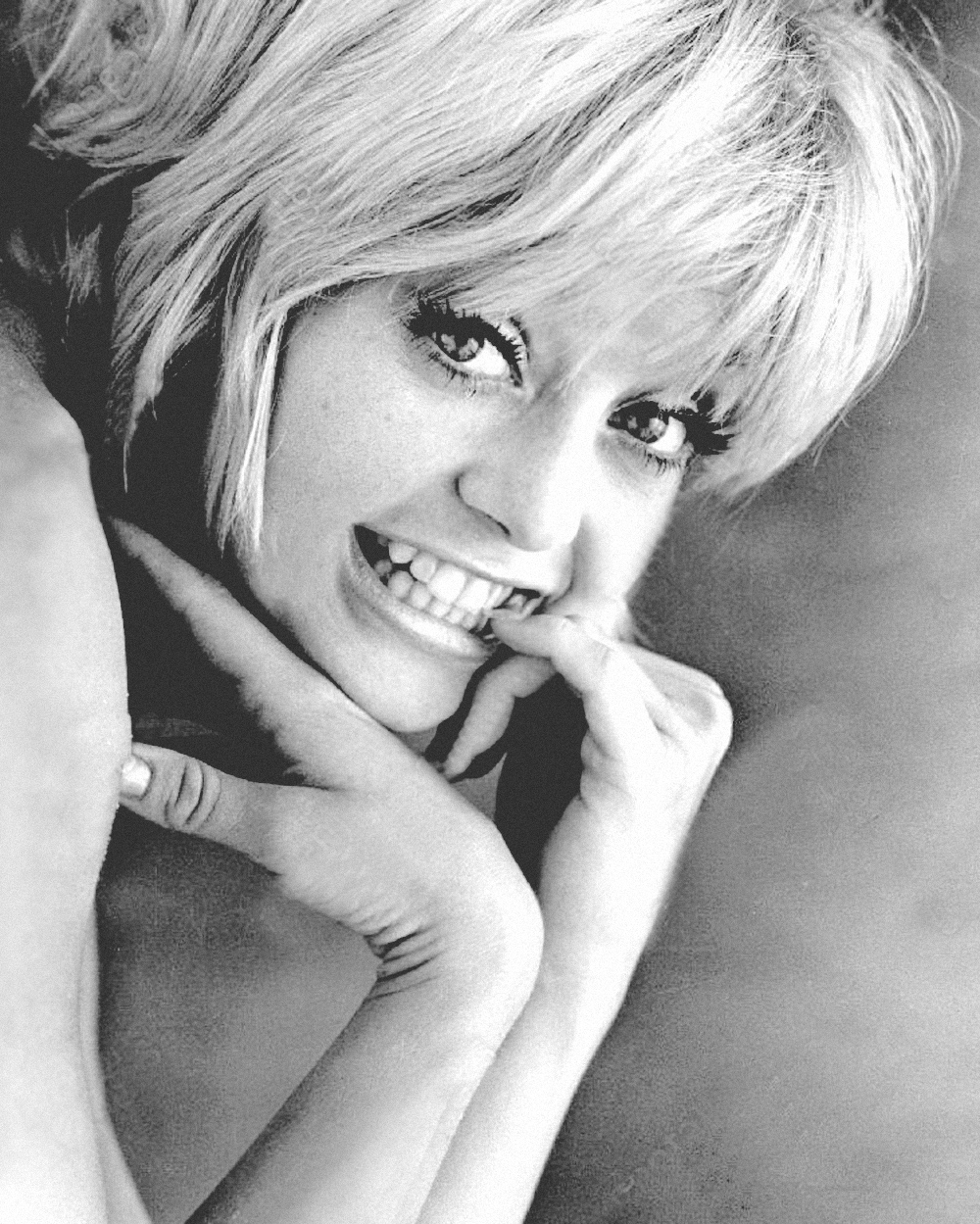
Goldie Hawn won for Cactus Flower (1969)

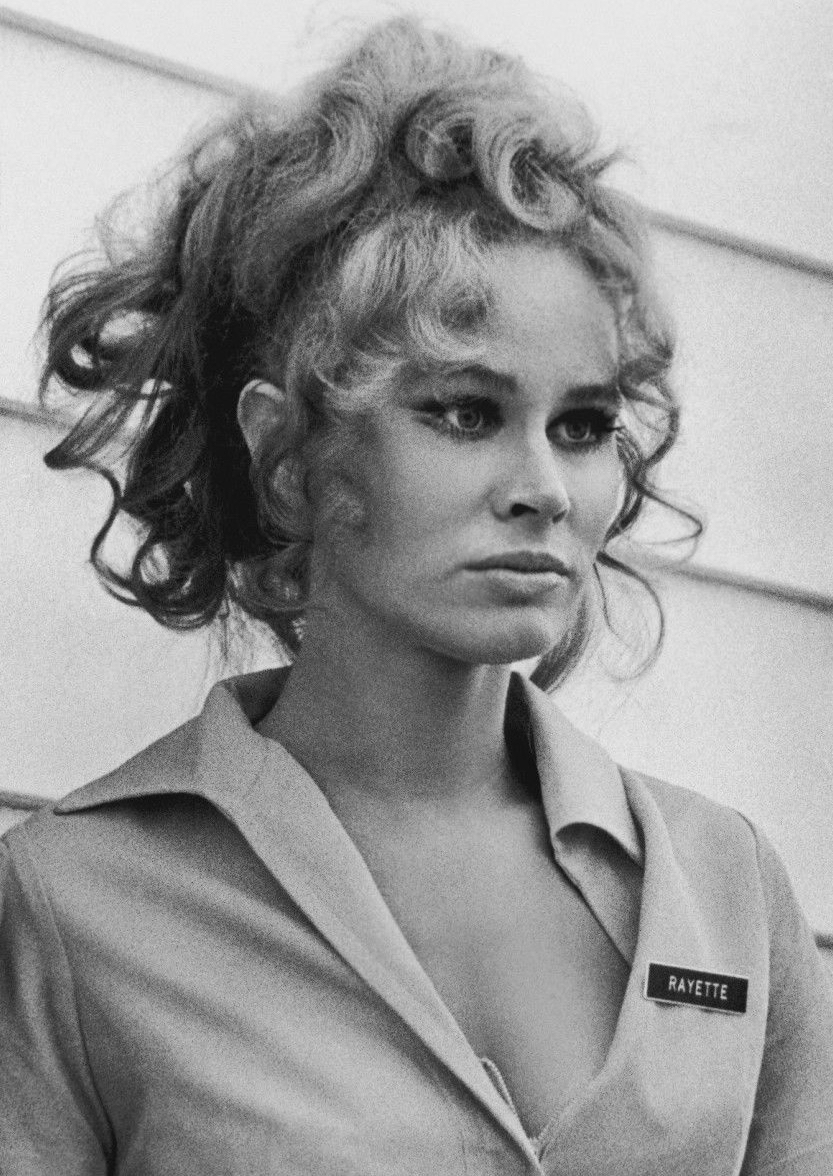
Karen Black won twice for Five Easy Pieces (1970) and The Great Gatsby (1974)

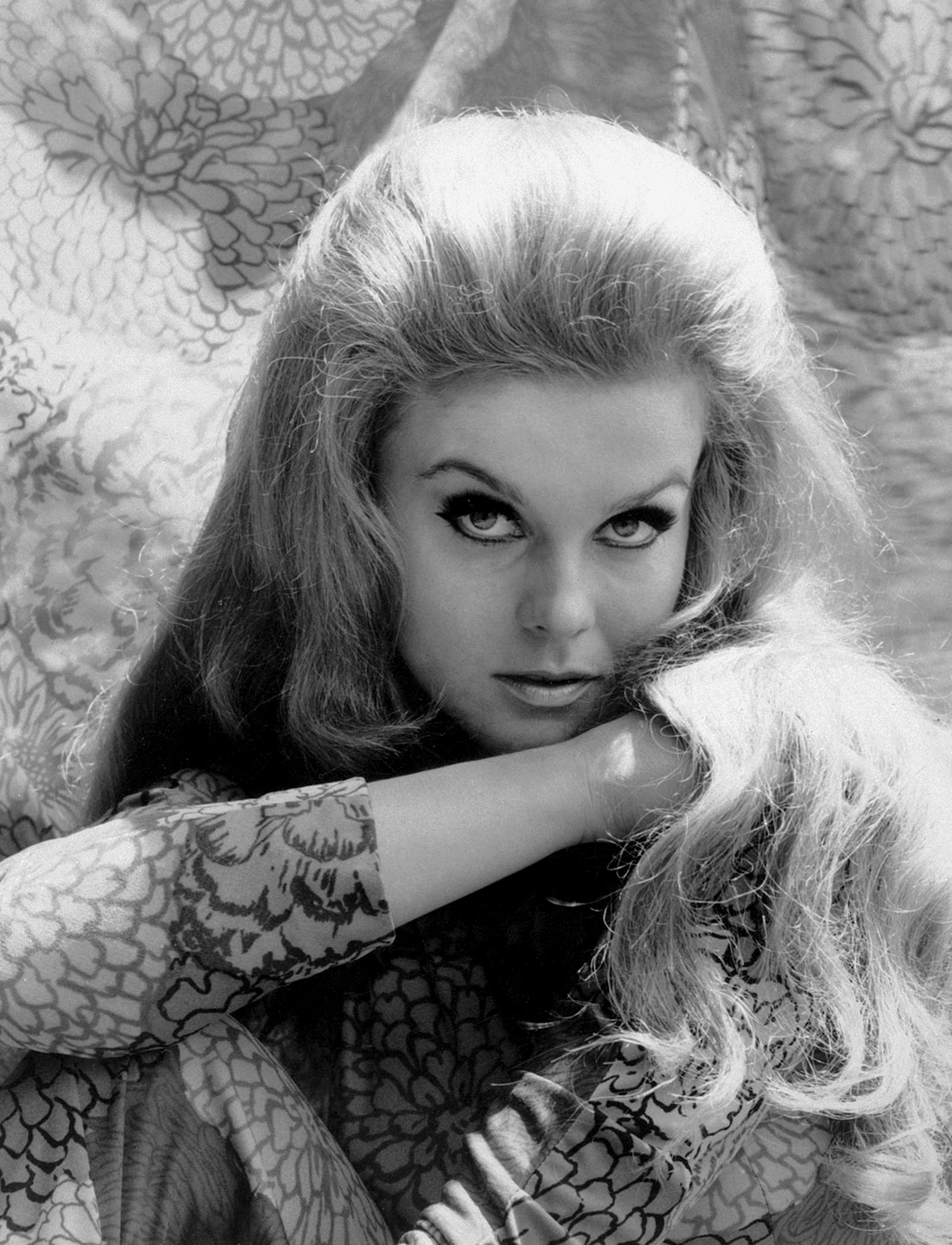
Ann-Margret won for Carnal Knowledge (1971)

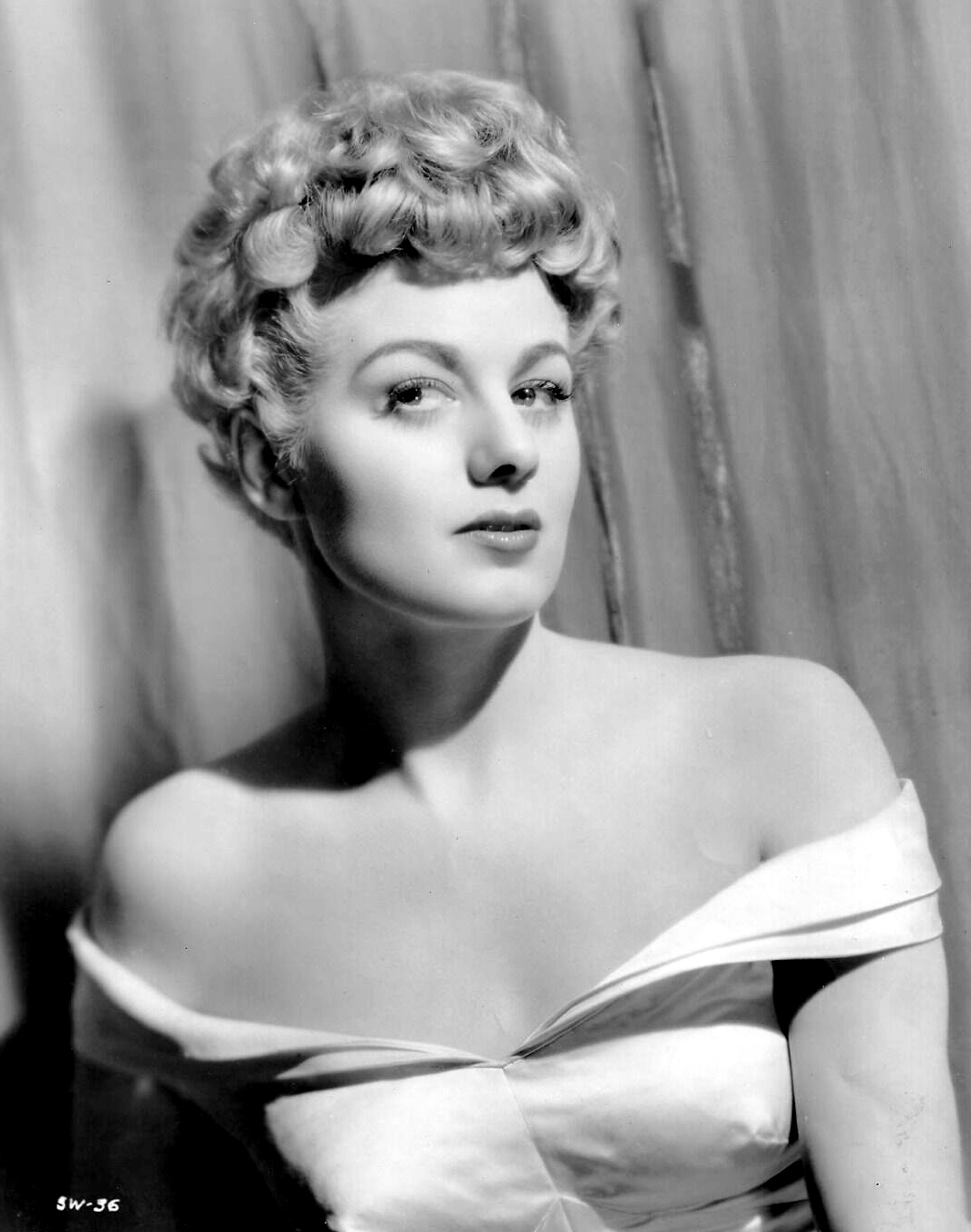
Shelley Winters won for The Poseidon Adventure (1972)

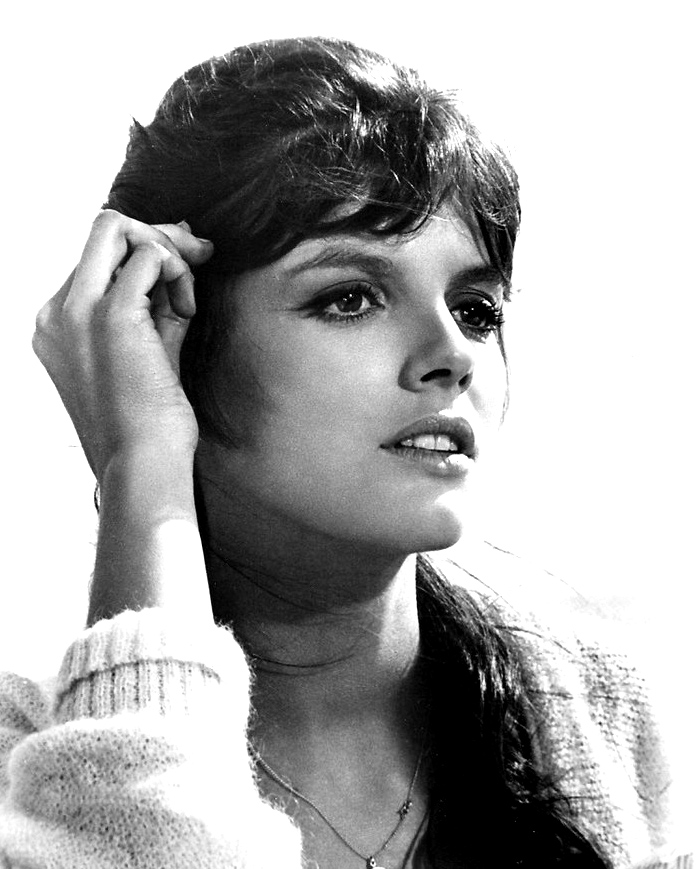
Katharine Ross won for Voyage of the Damned (1976)

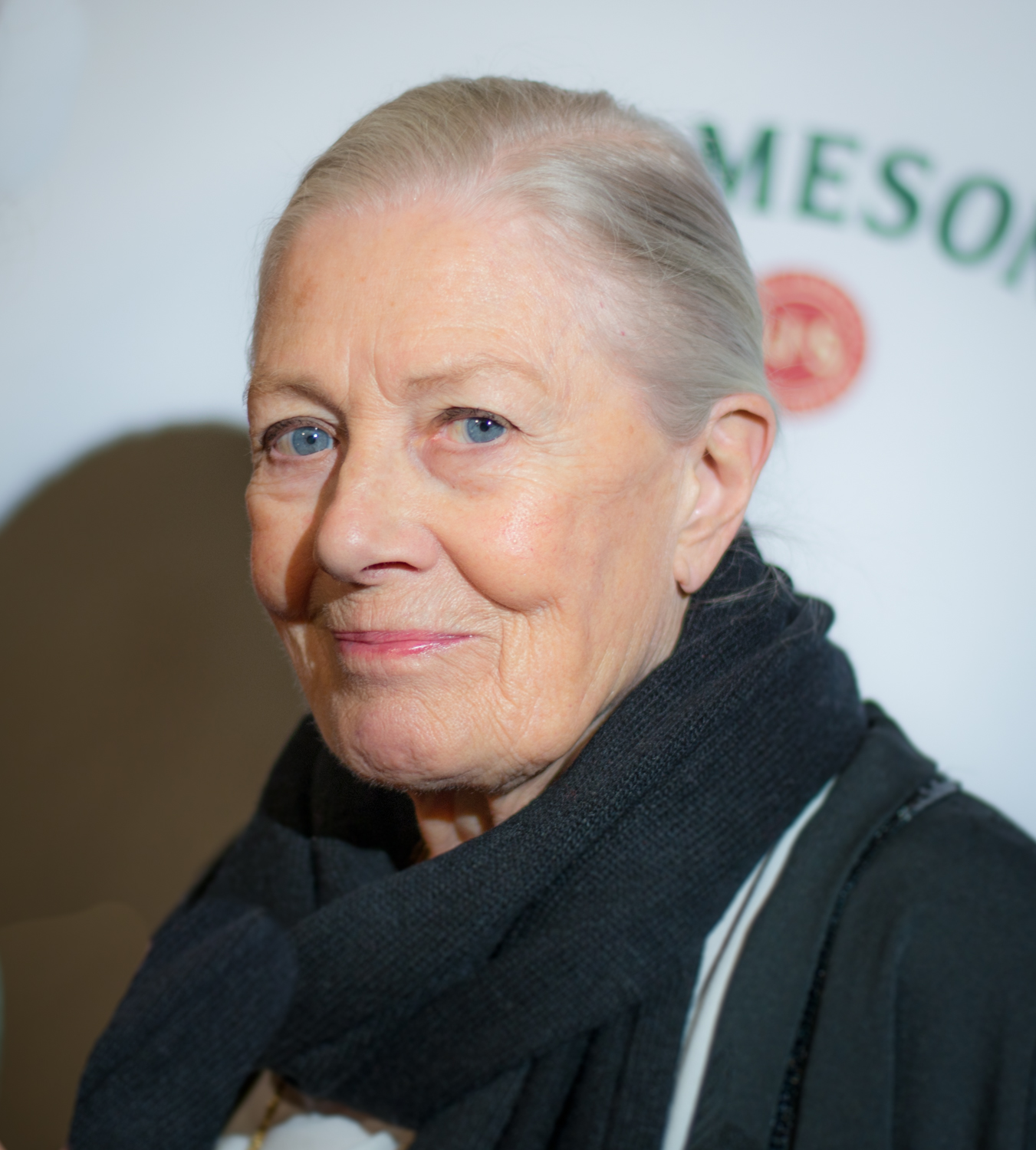
Vanessa Redgrave won for Julia (1977)

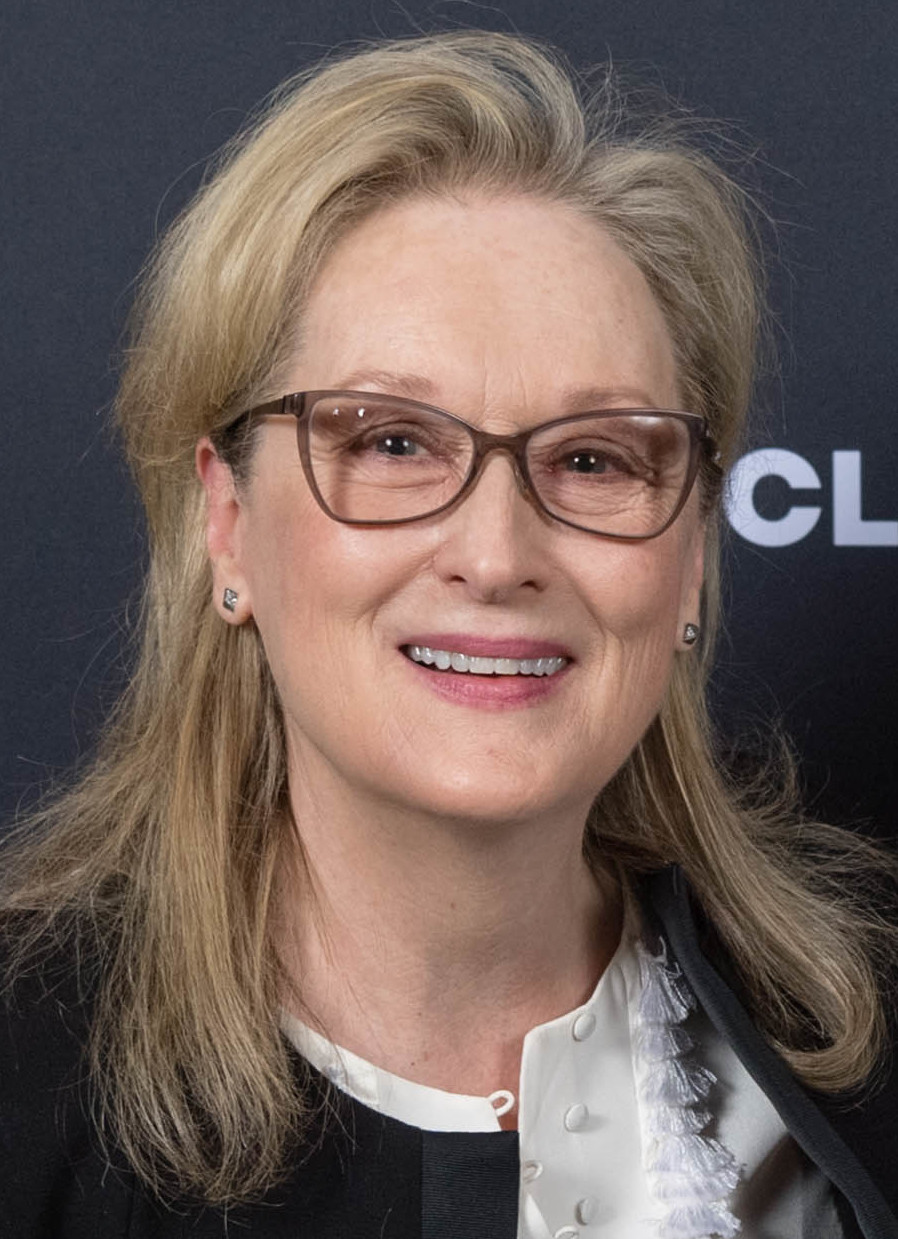
Meryl Streep won twice for Kramer vs. Kramer (1979) and Adaptation (2002)

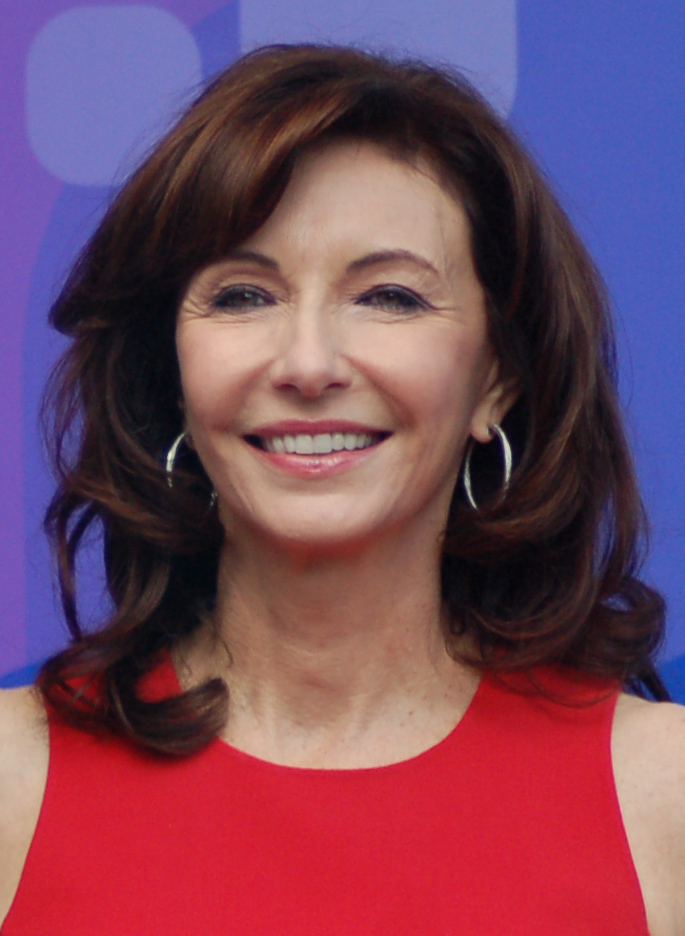
Mary Steenburgen won for Melvin and Howard (1980)

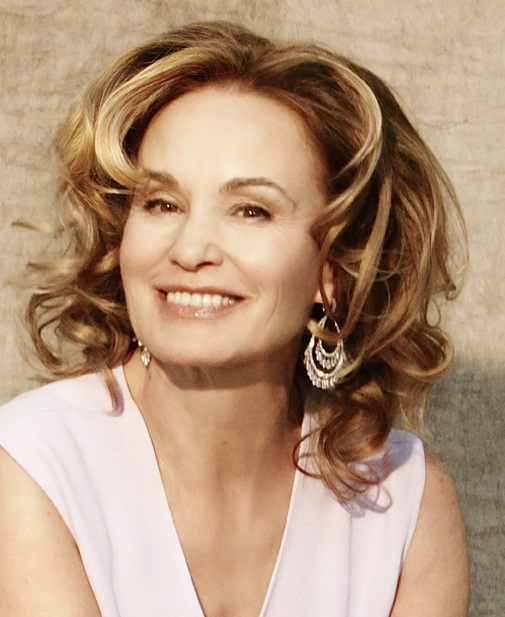
Jessica Lange won for Tootsie (1982)

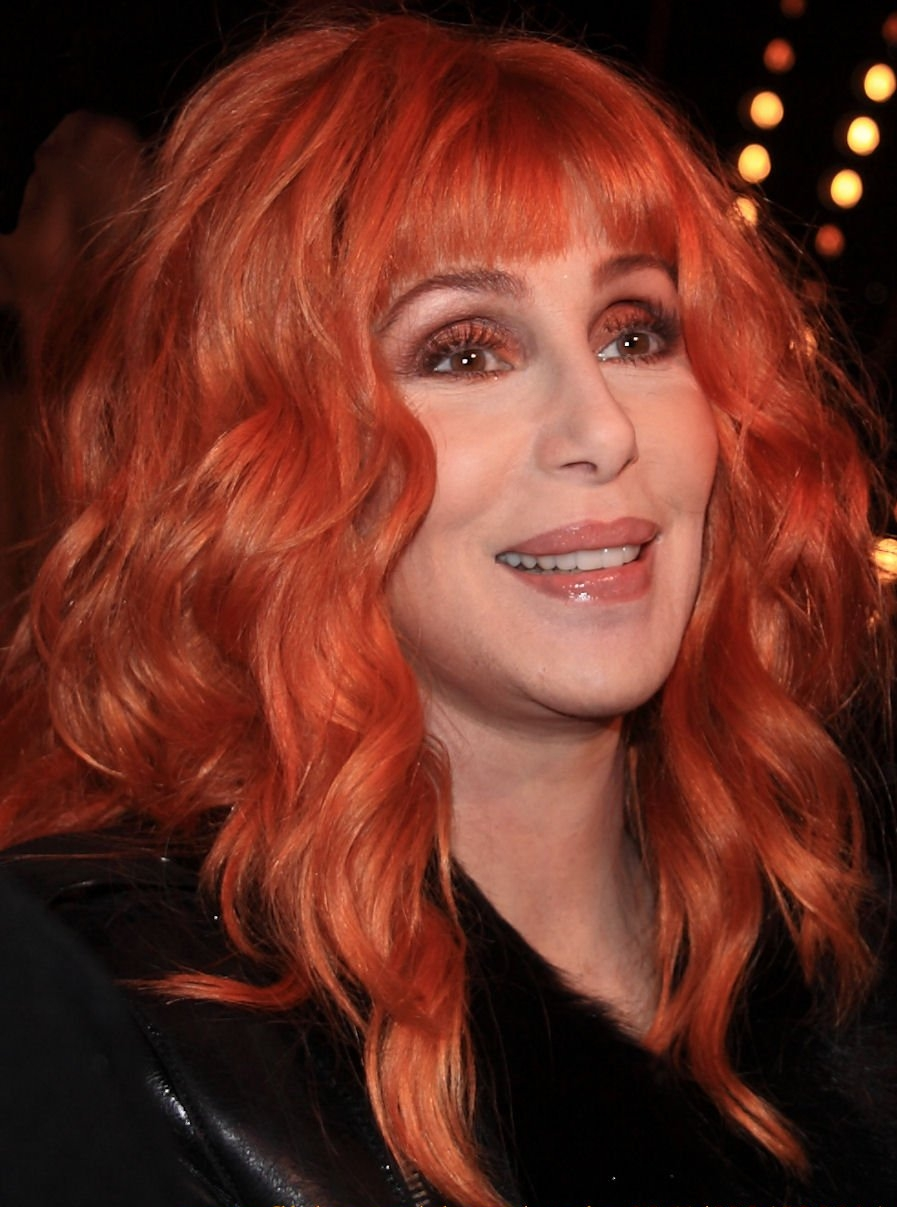
Cher won for Silkwood (1983)

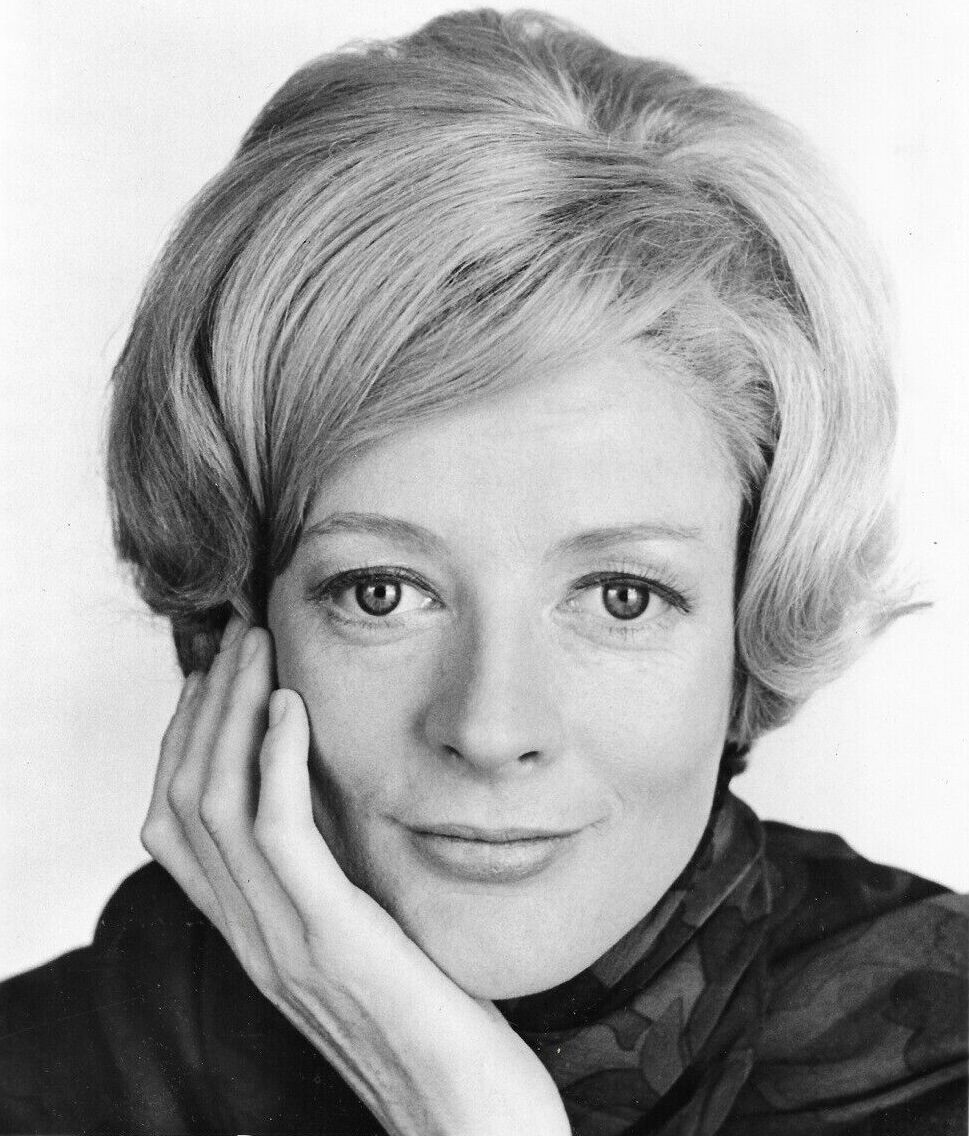
Dame Maggie Smith won for A Room with a View (1986)

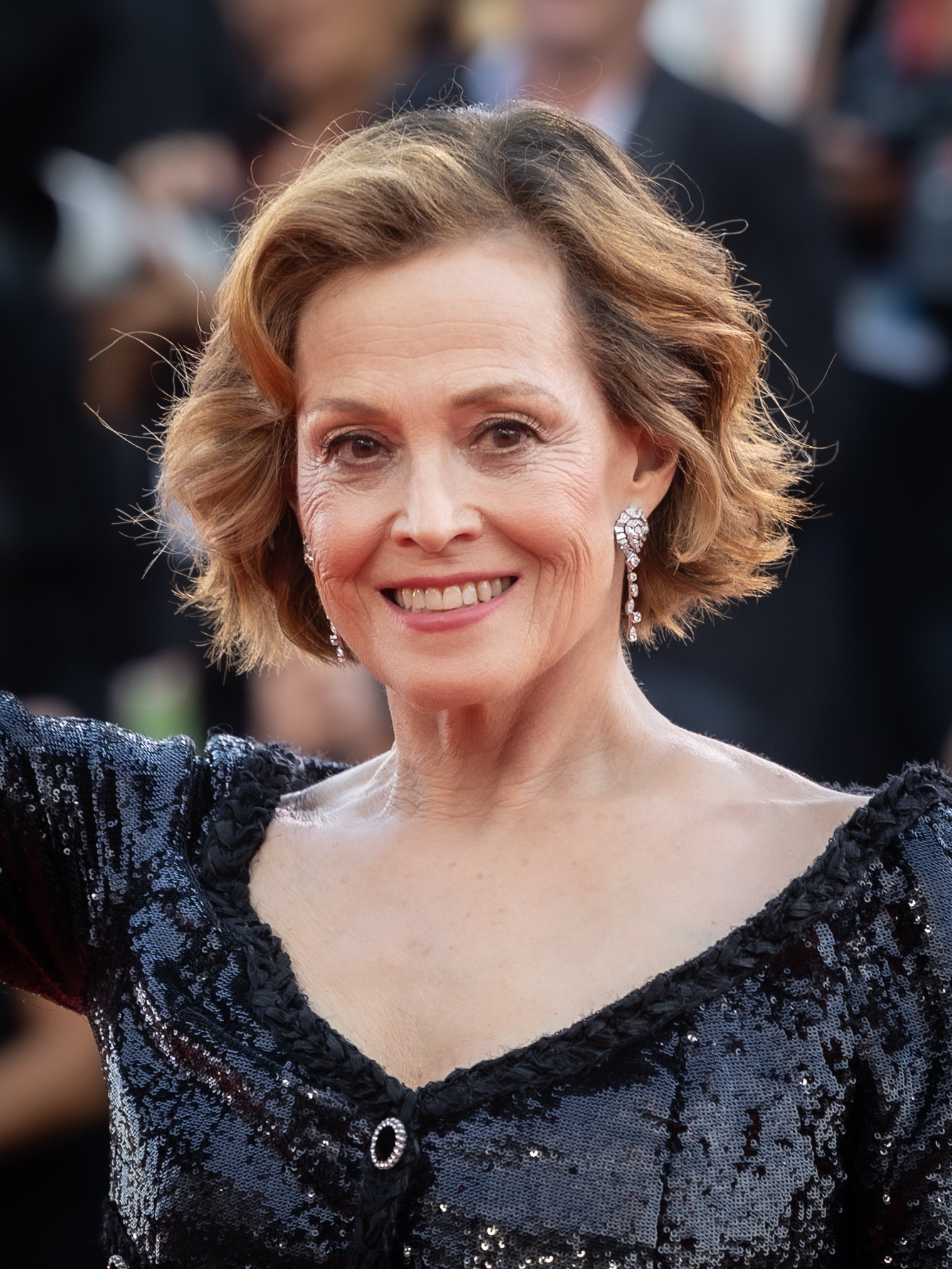
Sigourney Weaver won for Working Girl (1988)

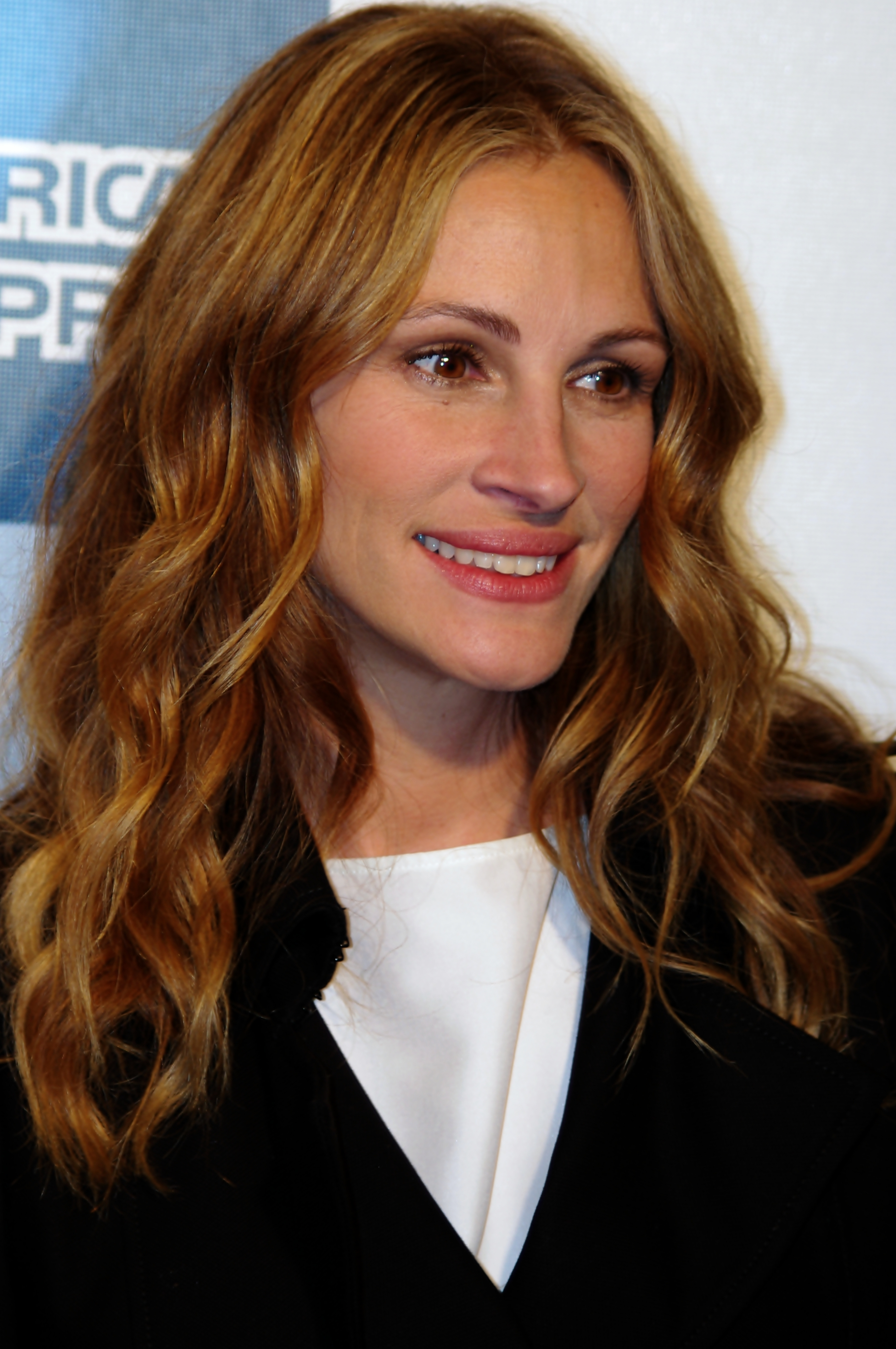
Julia Roberts won for Steel Magnolias (1989)

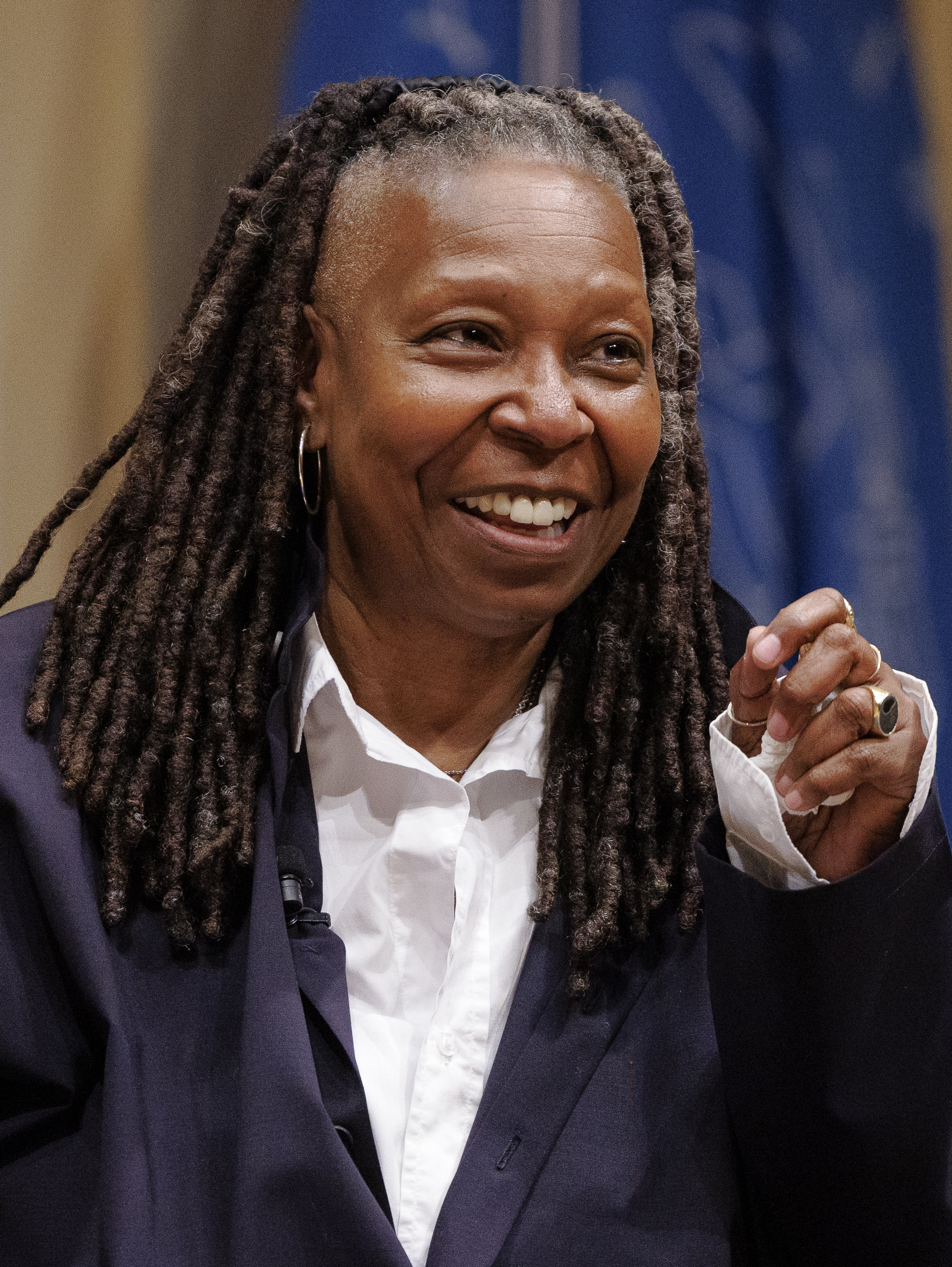
Whoopi Goldberg won for Ghost (1990)

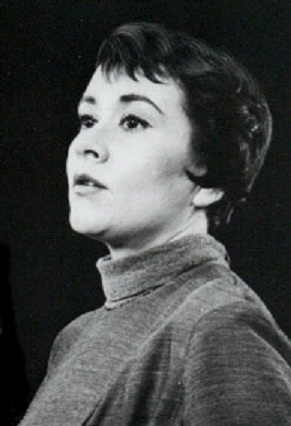
Joan Plowright won for Enchanted April (1991)

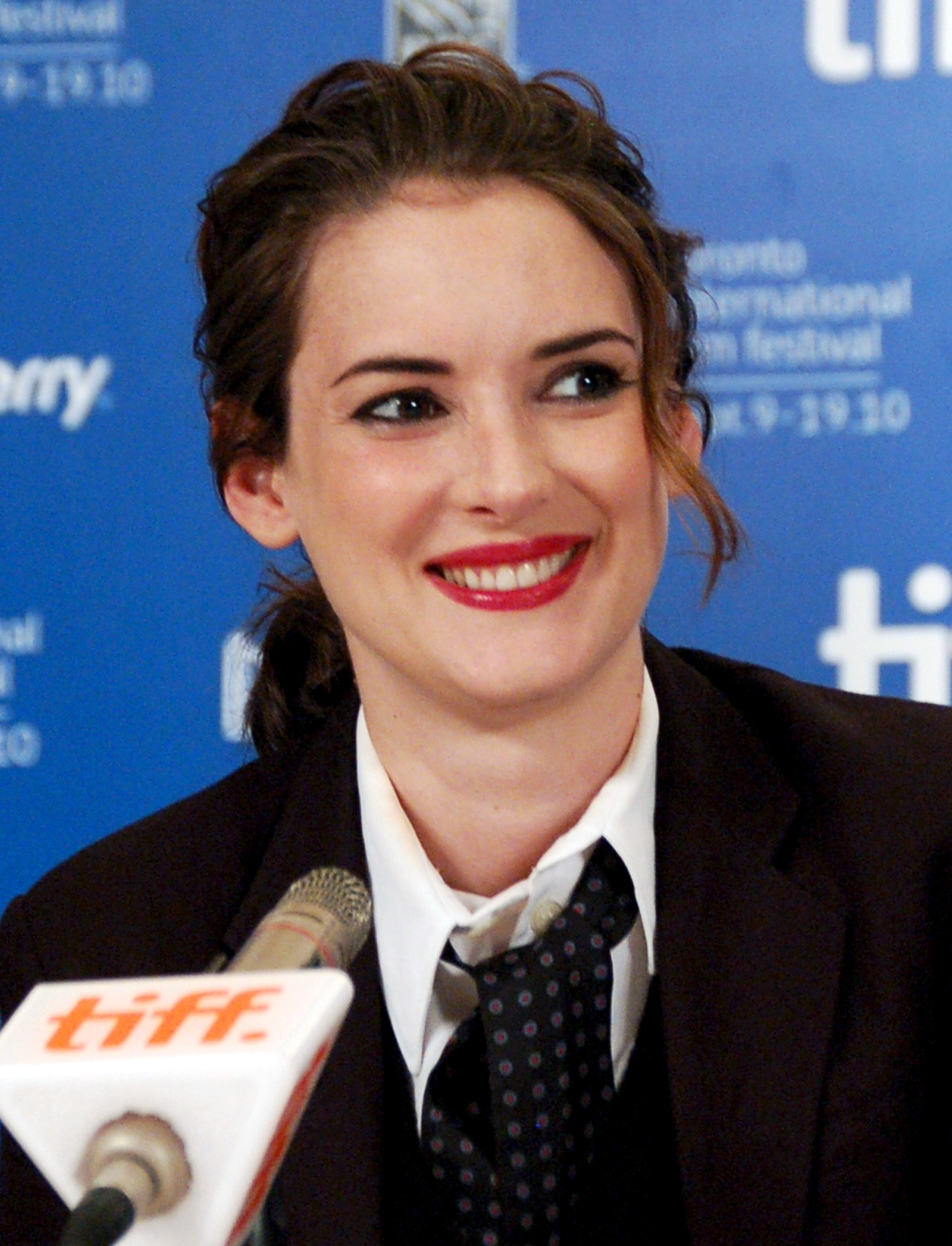
Winona Ryder won for The Age of Innocence (1993)

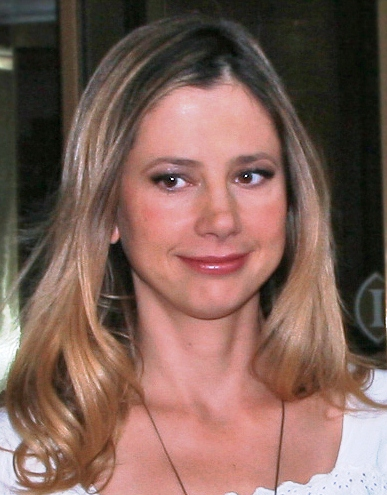
Mira Sorvino won for Mighty Aphrodite (1995)

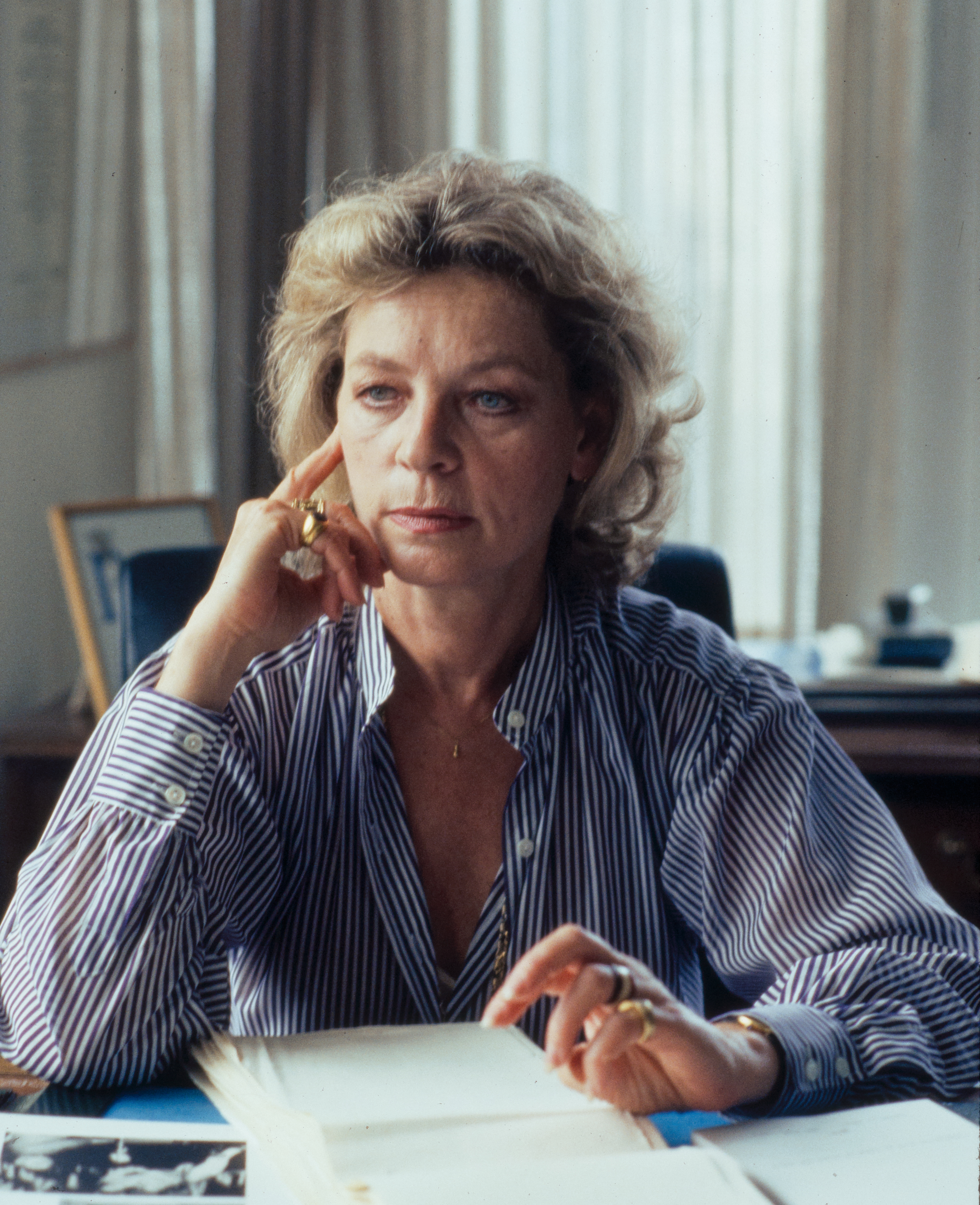
Lauren Bacall won for The Mirror Has Two Faces (1996)

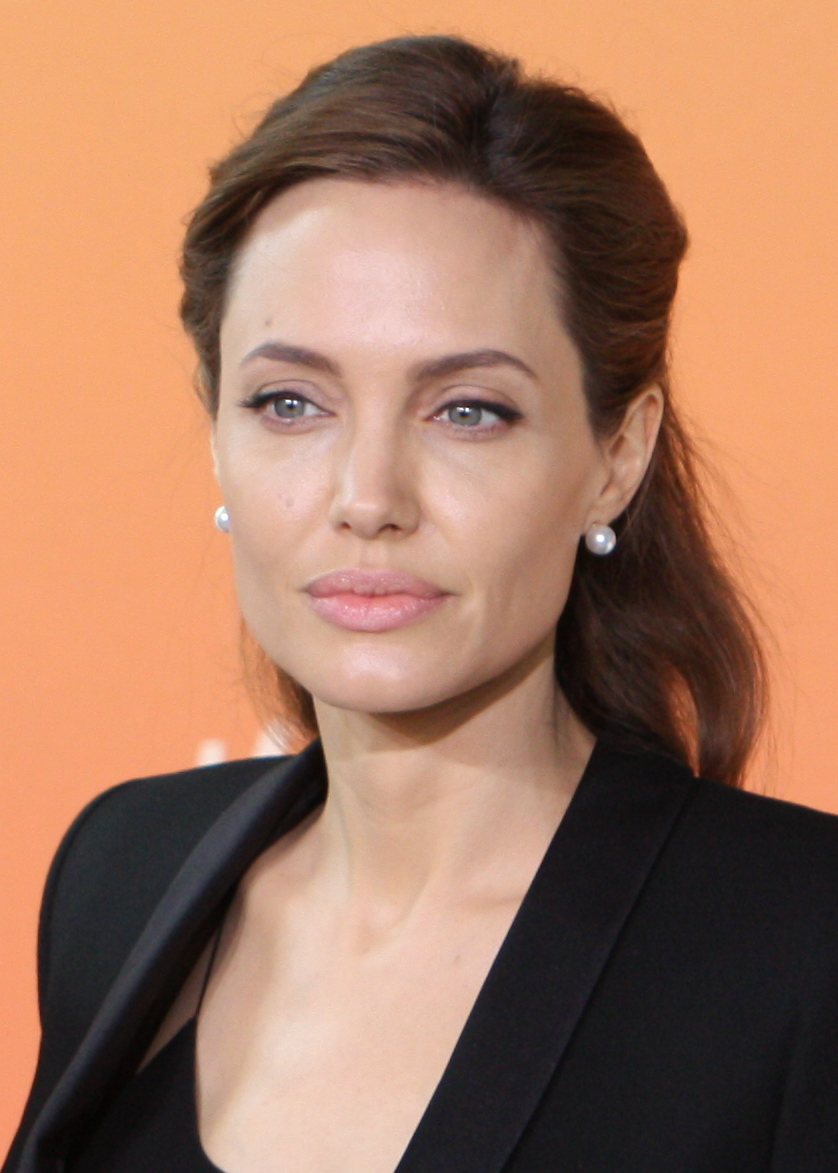
Angelina Jolie won for Girl, Interrupted (1999)

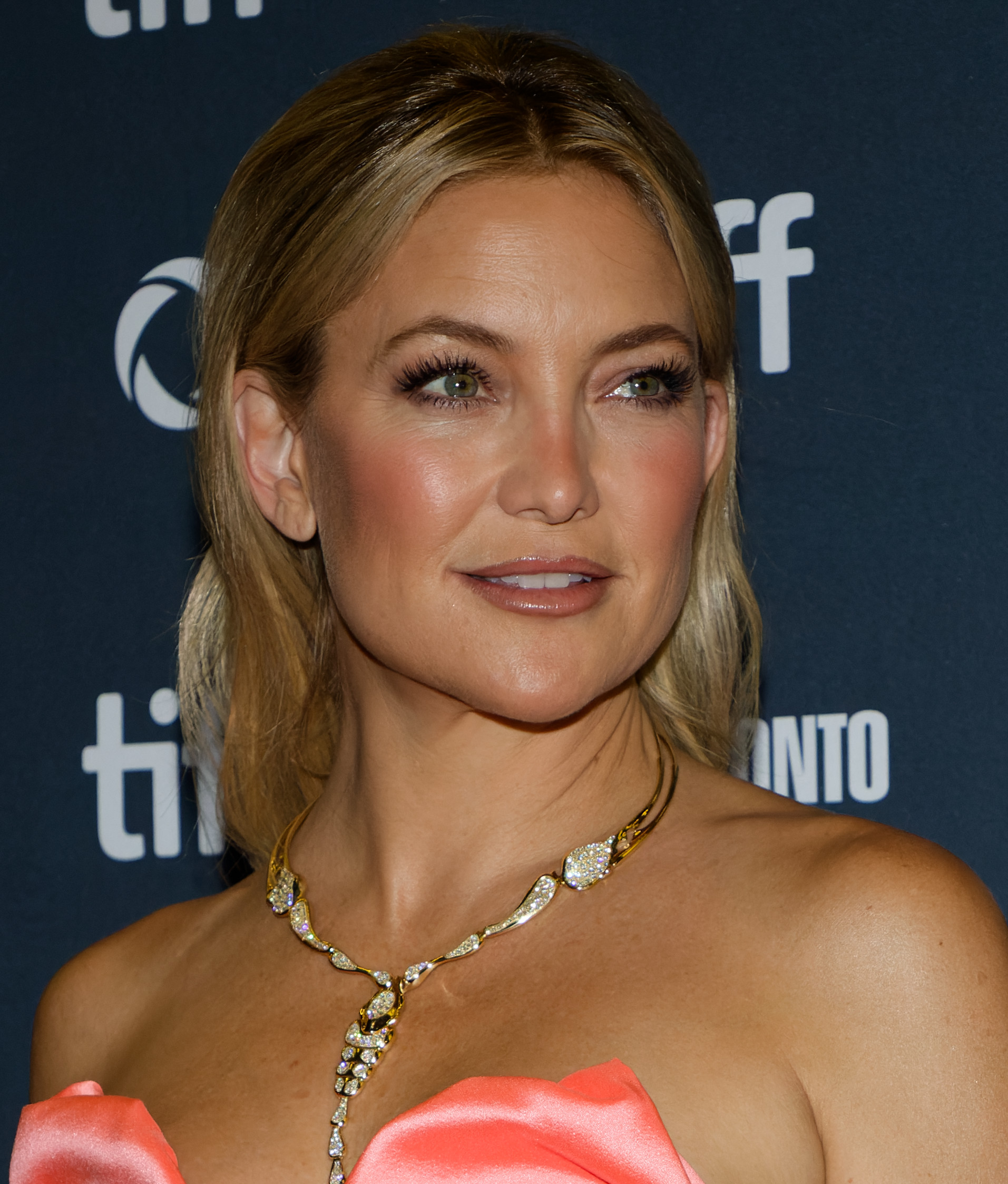
Kate Hudson won for Almost Famous (2000)

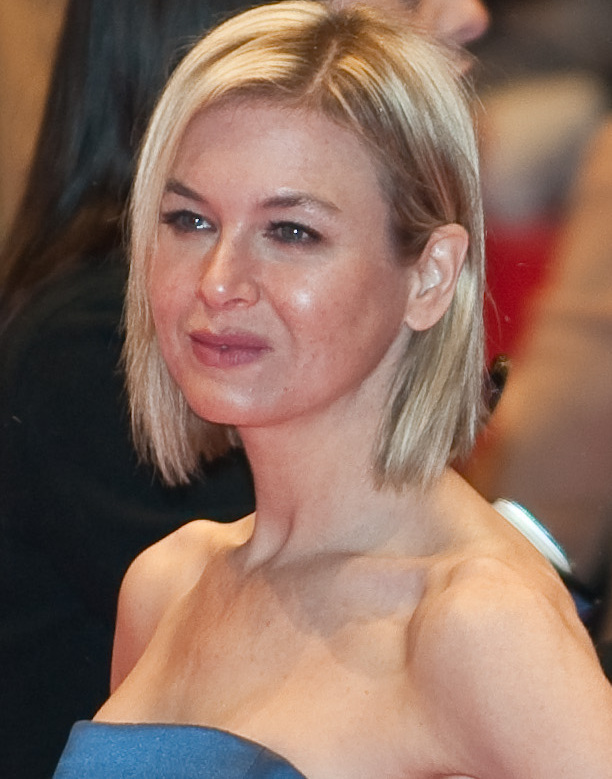
Renée Zellweger won for Cold Mountain (2003)

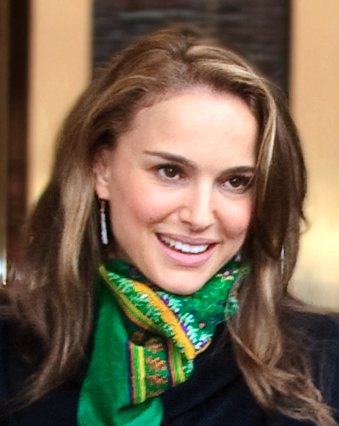
Natalie Portman won for Closer (2004)

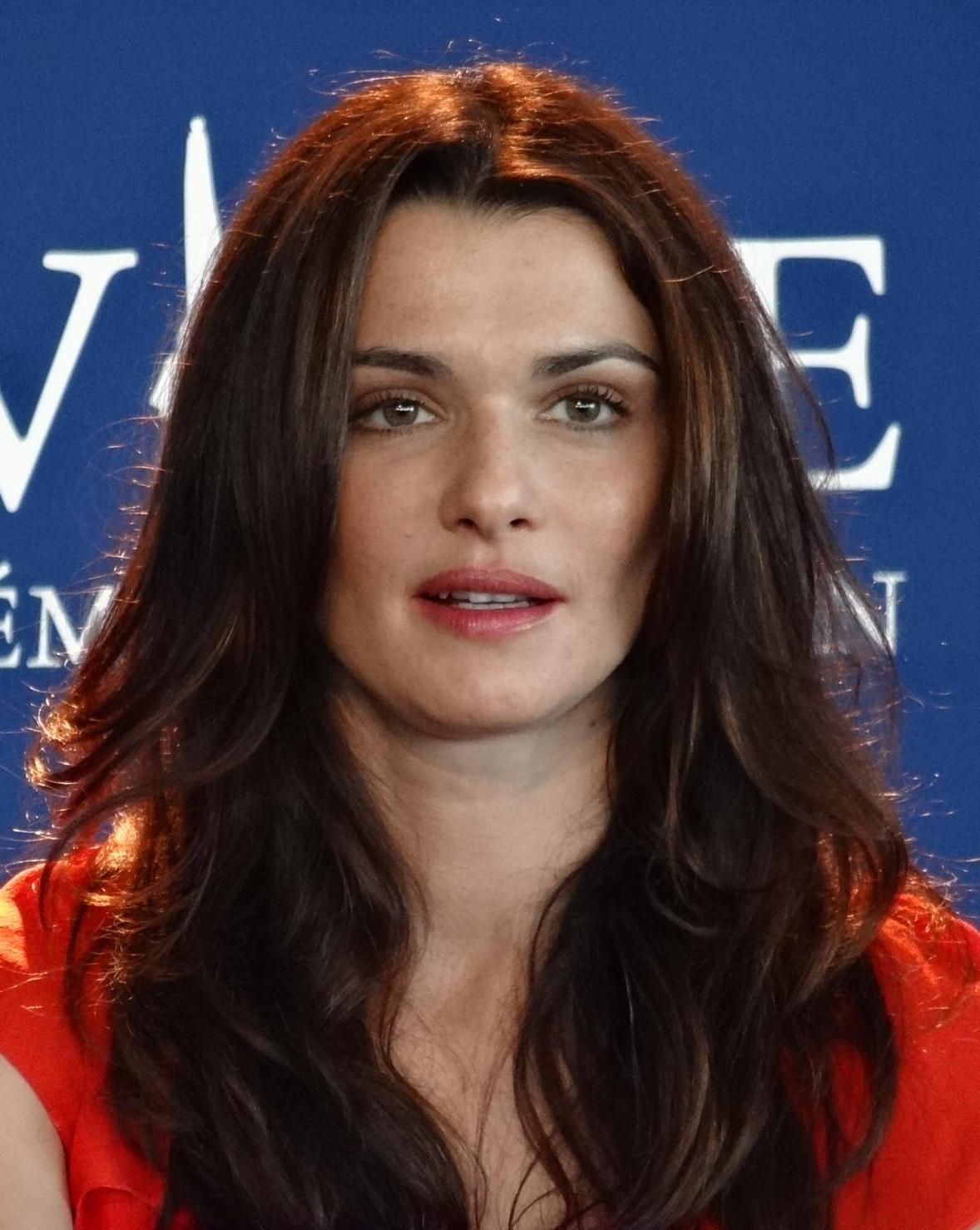
Rachel Weisz won for The Constant Gardner (2005)

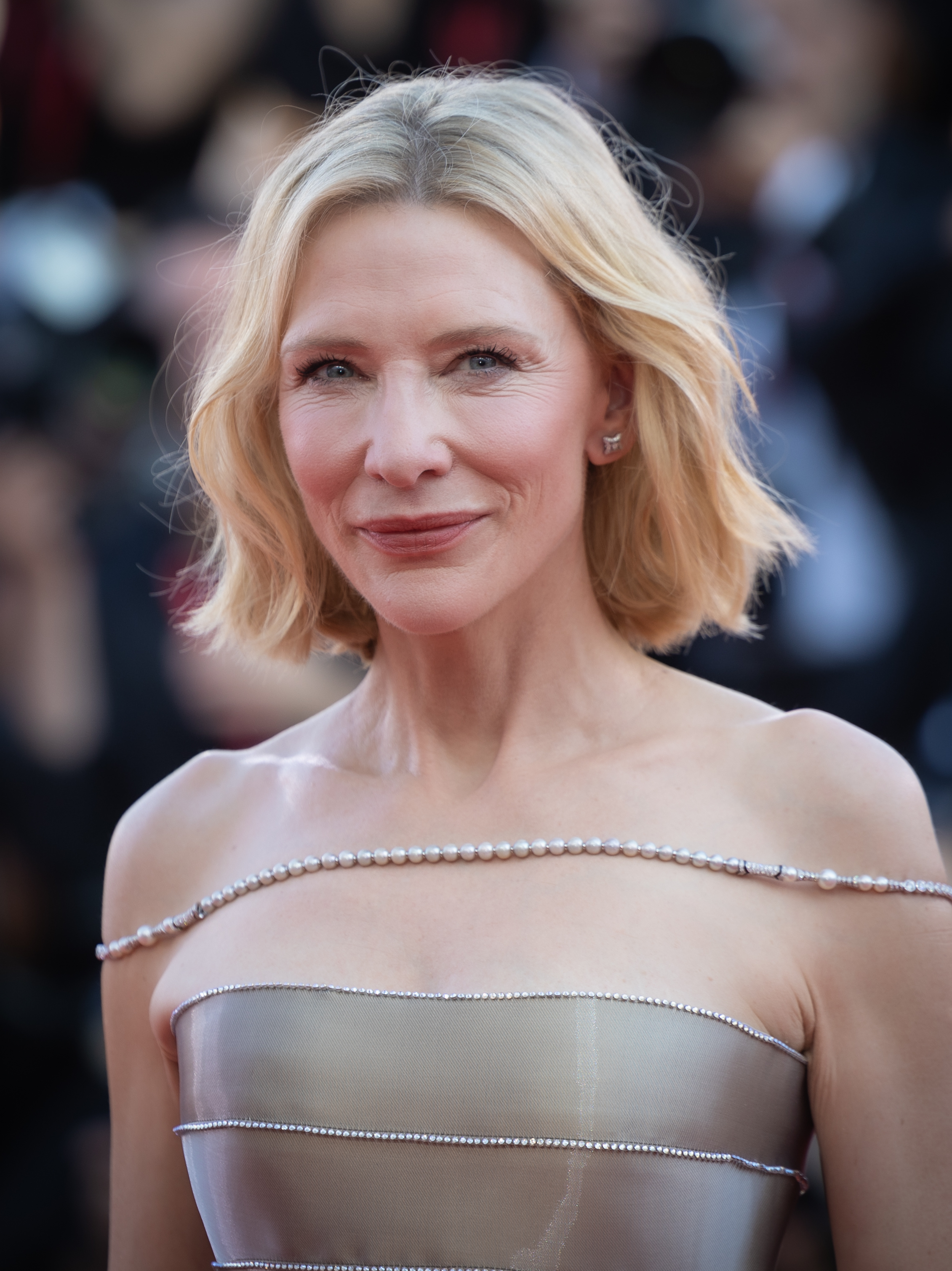
Cate Blanchett won for I'm Not There (2007)

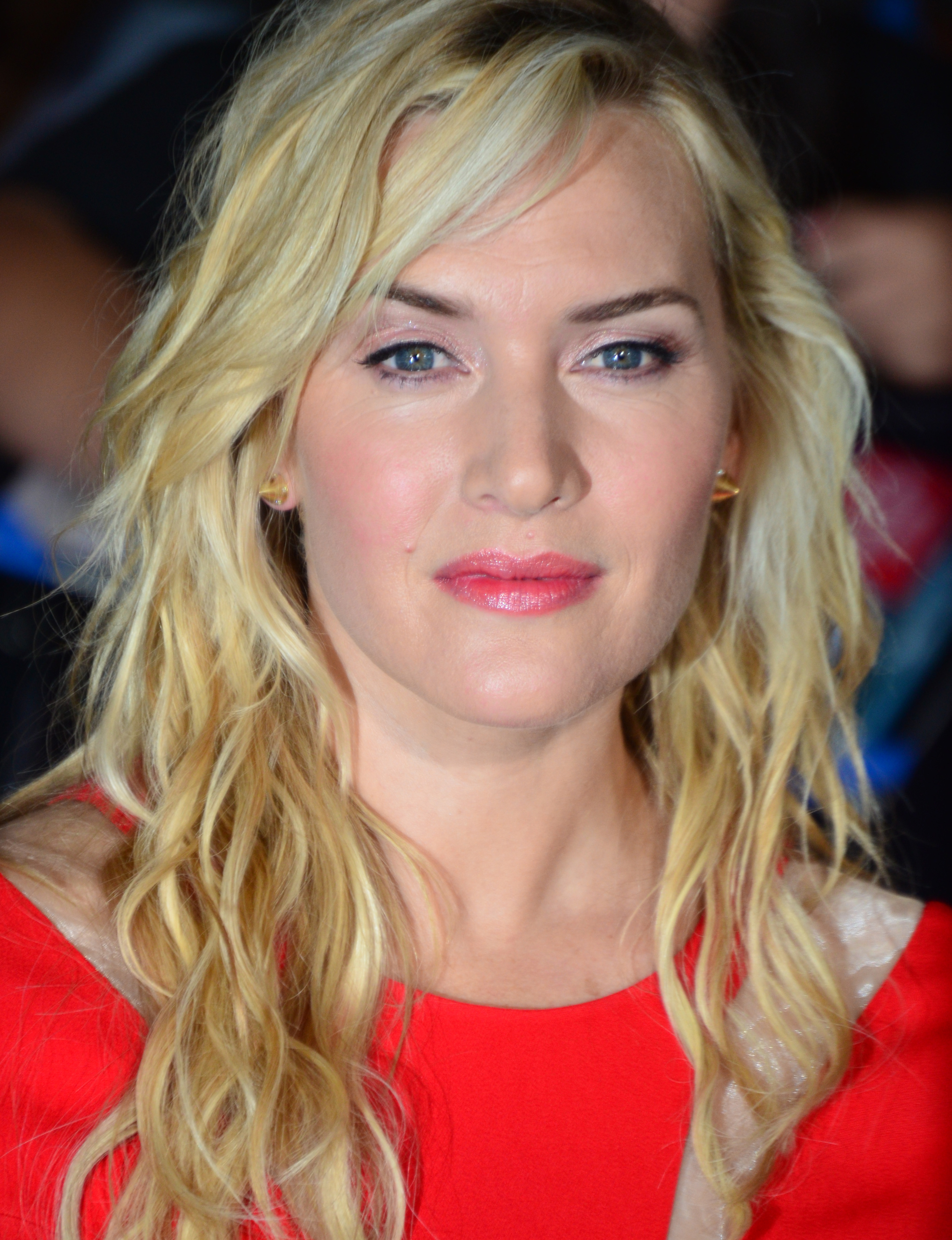
Kate Winslet won twice for The Reader (2008) and Steve Jobs (2015)

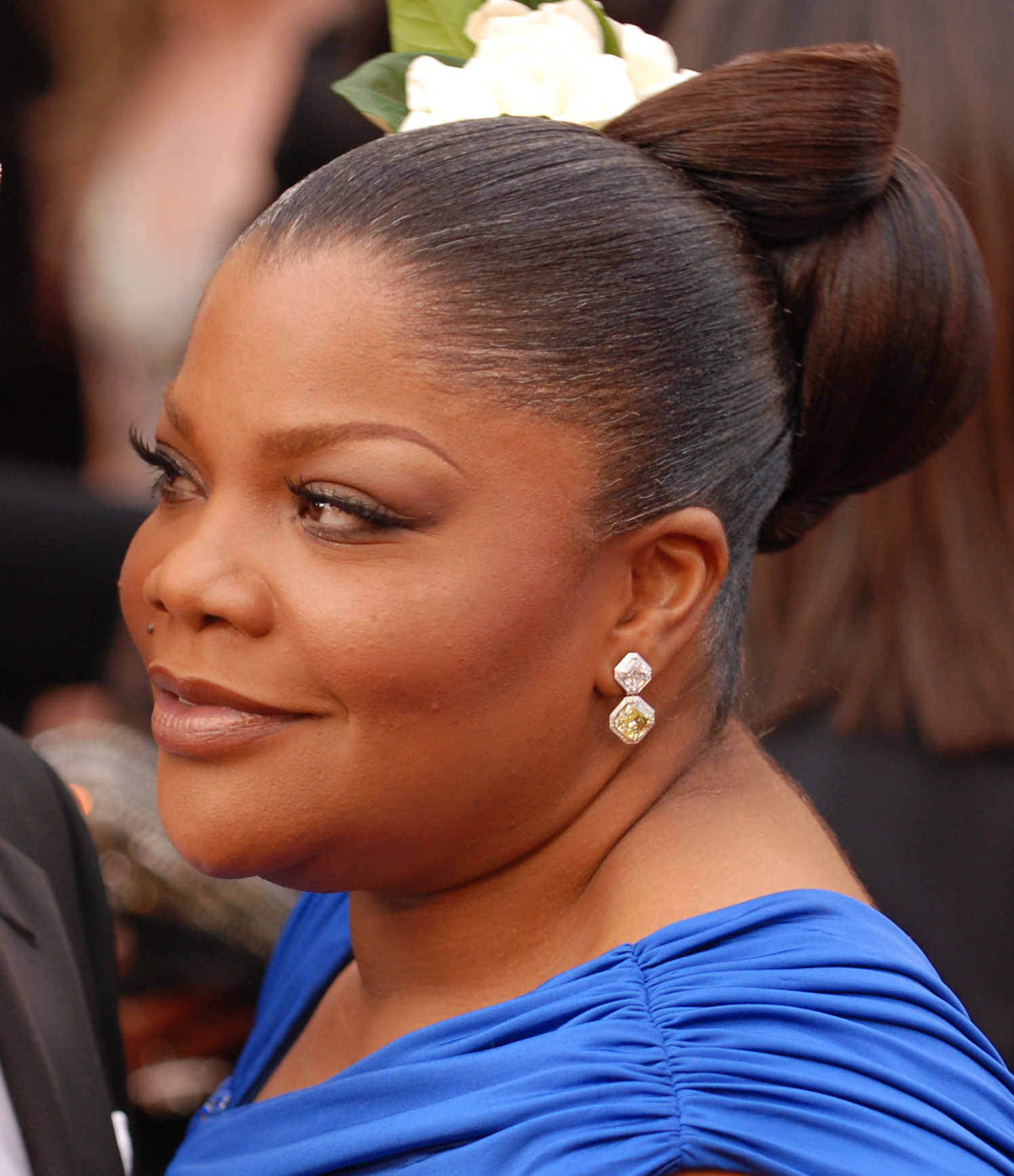
Mo'Nique won for Precious (2009)

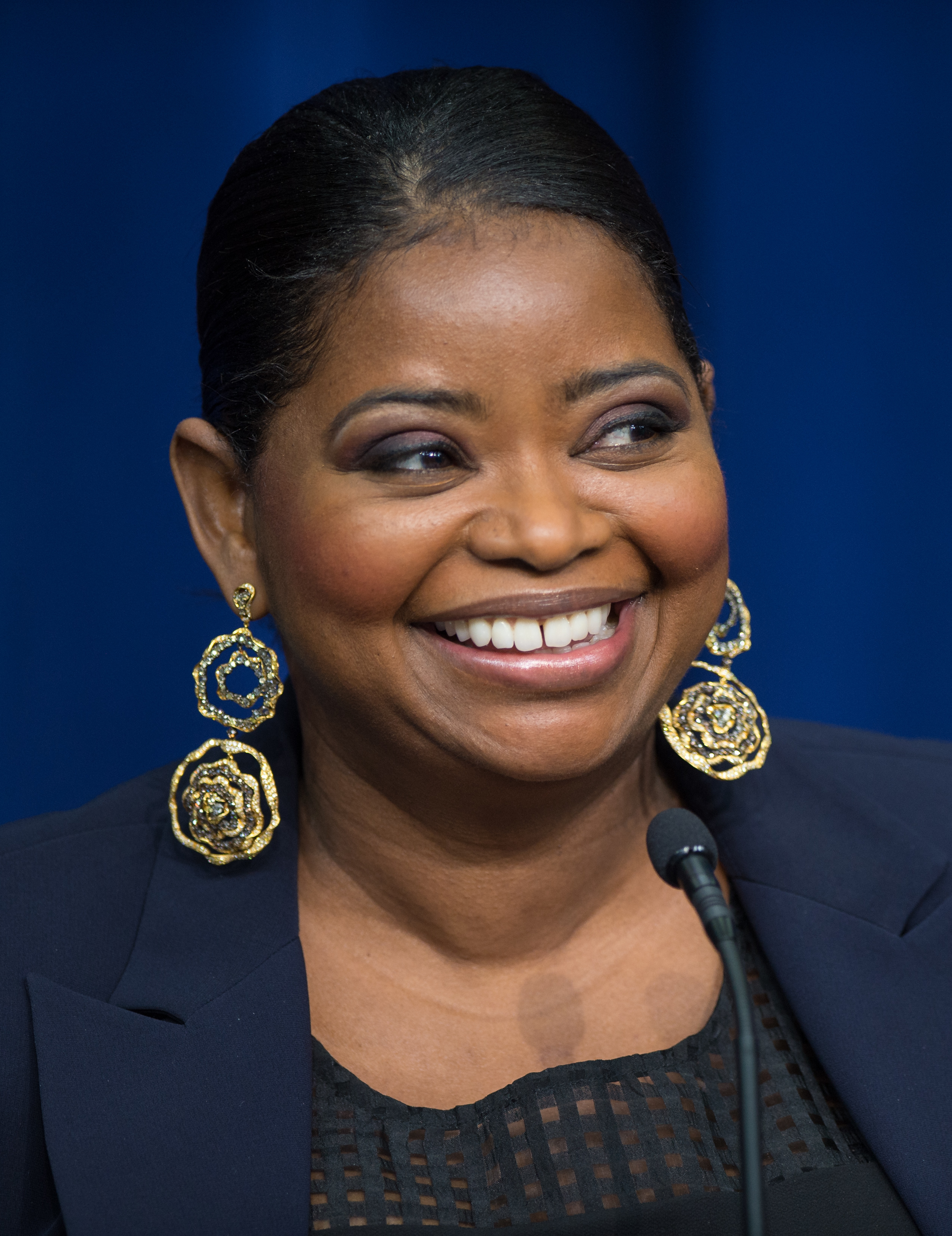
Octavia Spencer won for The Help (2011)

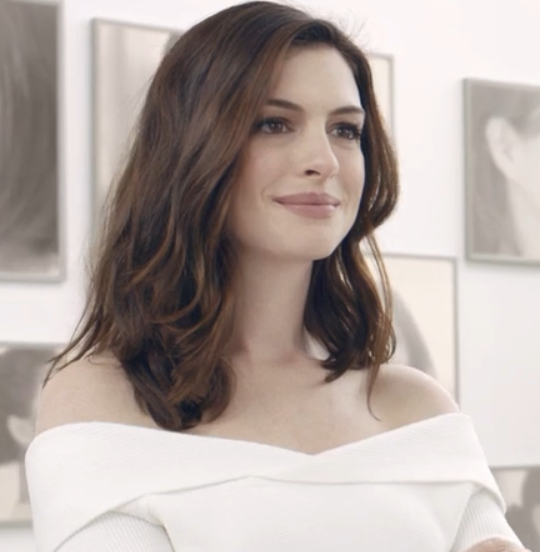
Anne Hathaway won for Les Misérables (2012)

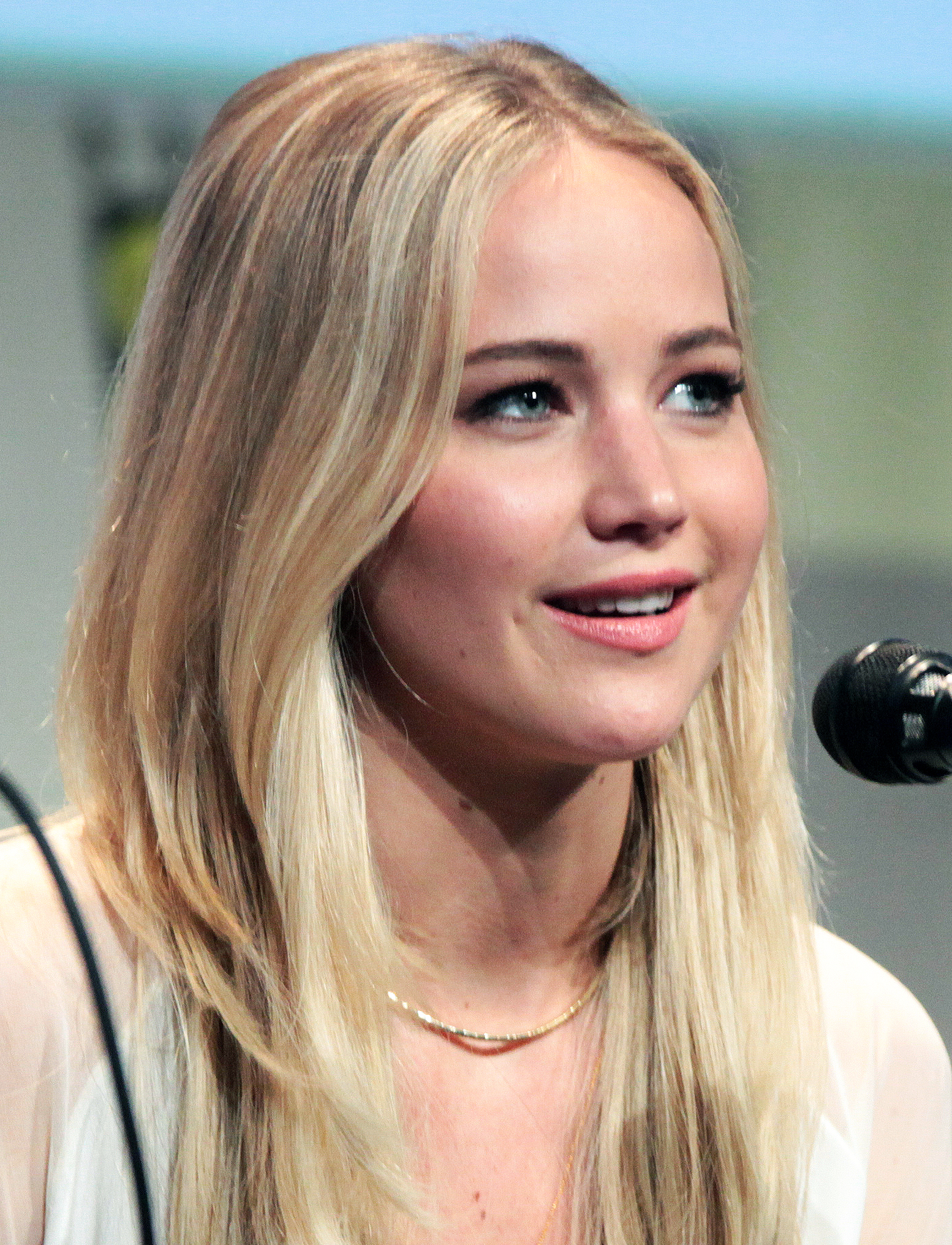
Jennifer Lawrence won for American Hustle (2013)

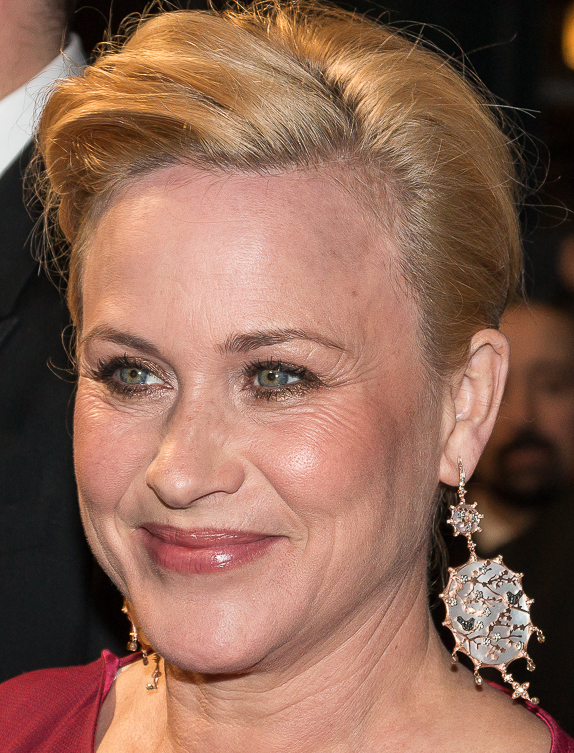
Patricia Arquette won for Boyhood (2014)

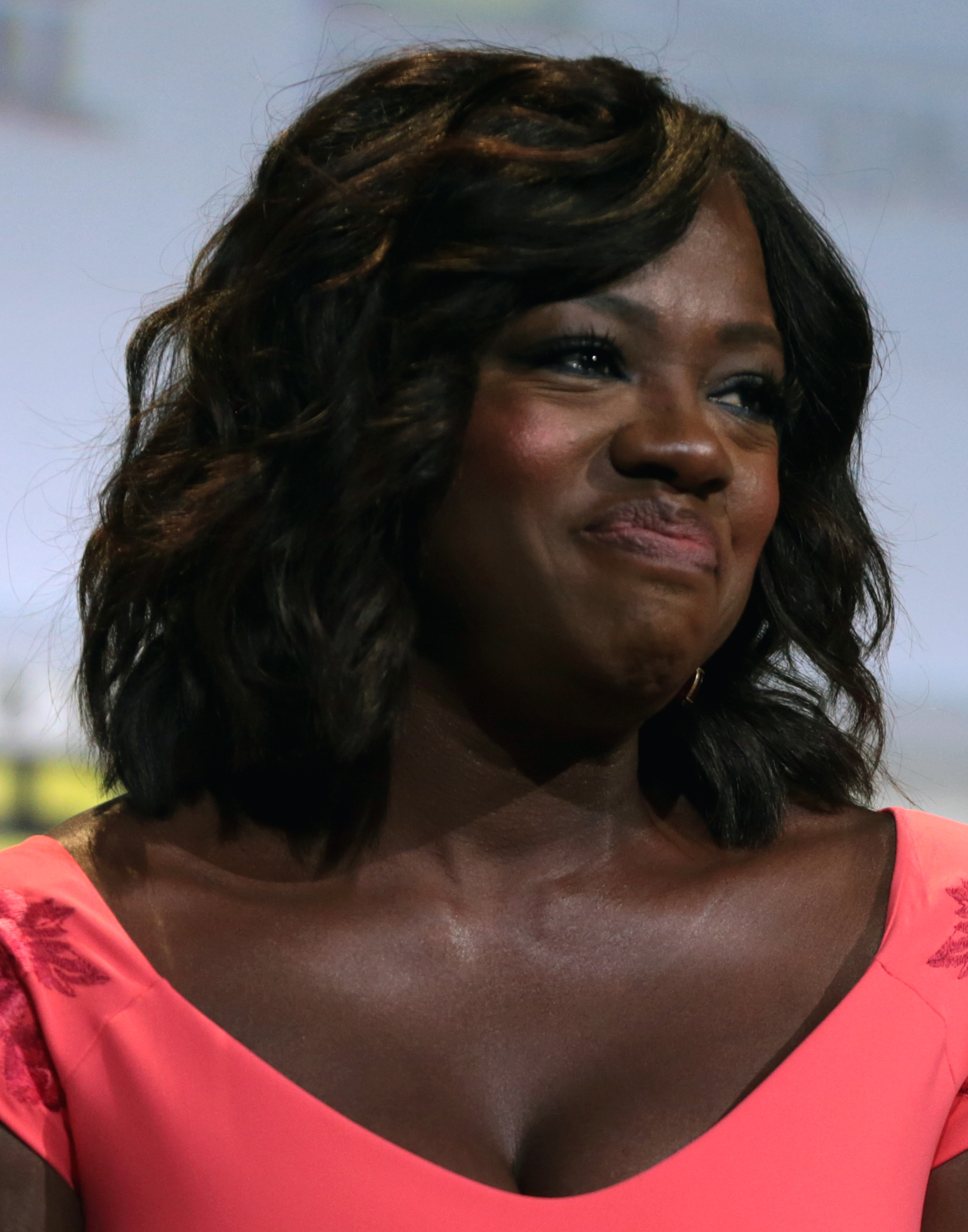
Viola Davis won for Fences (2016)

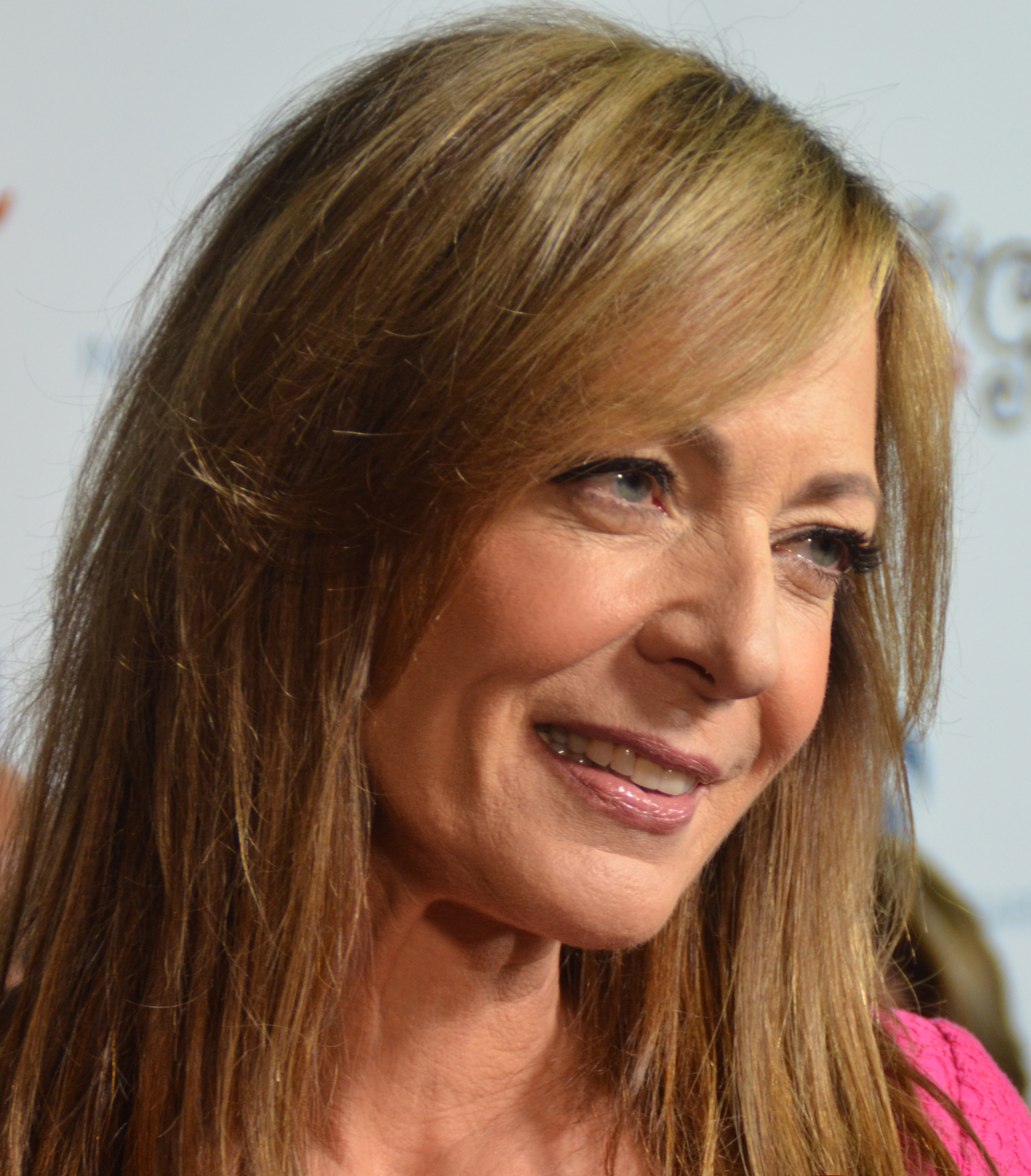
Allison Janney won for I, Tonya (2017)

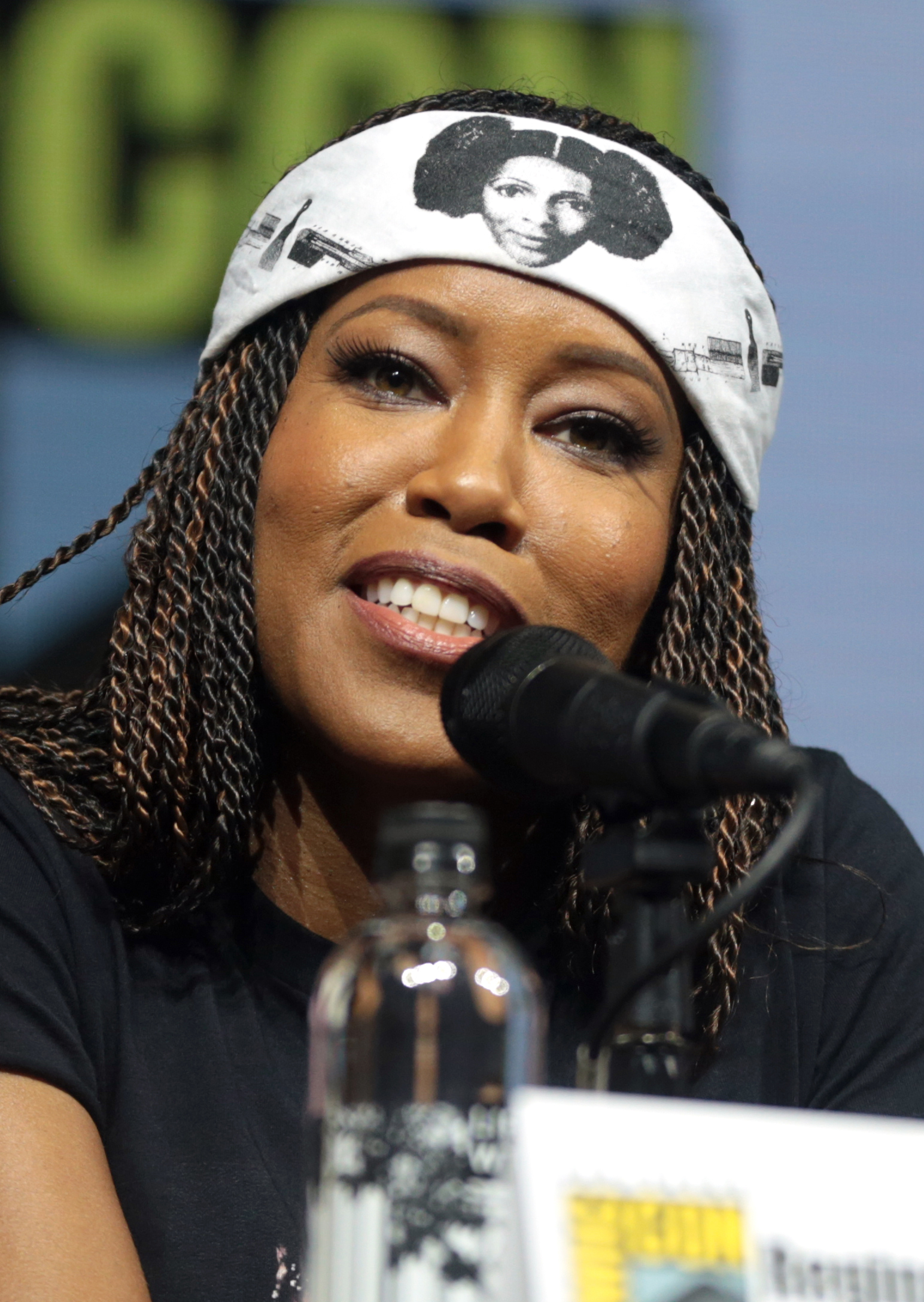
Regina King won for If Beale Street Could Talk (2018)

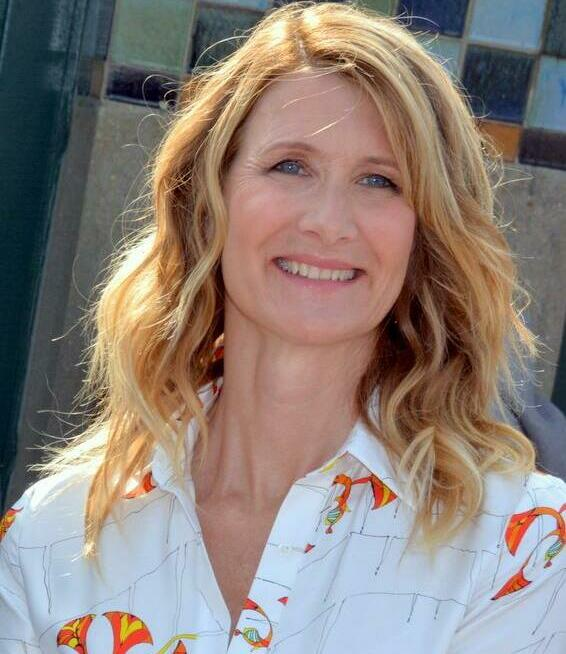
Laura Dern won for Marriage Story (2019)

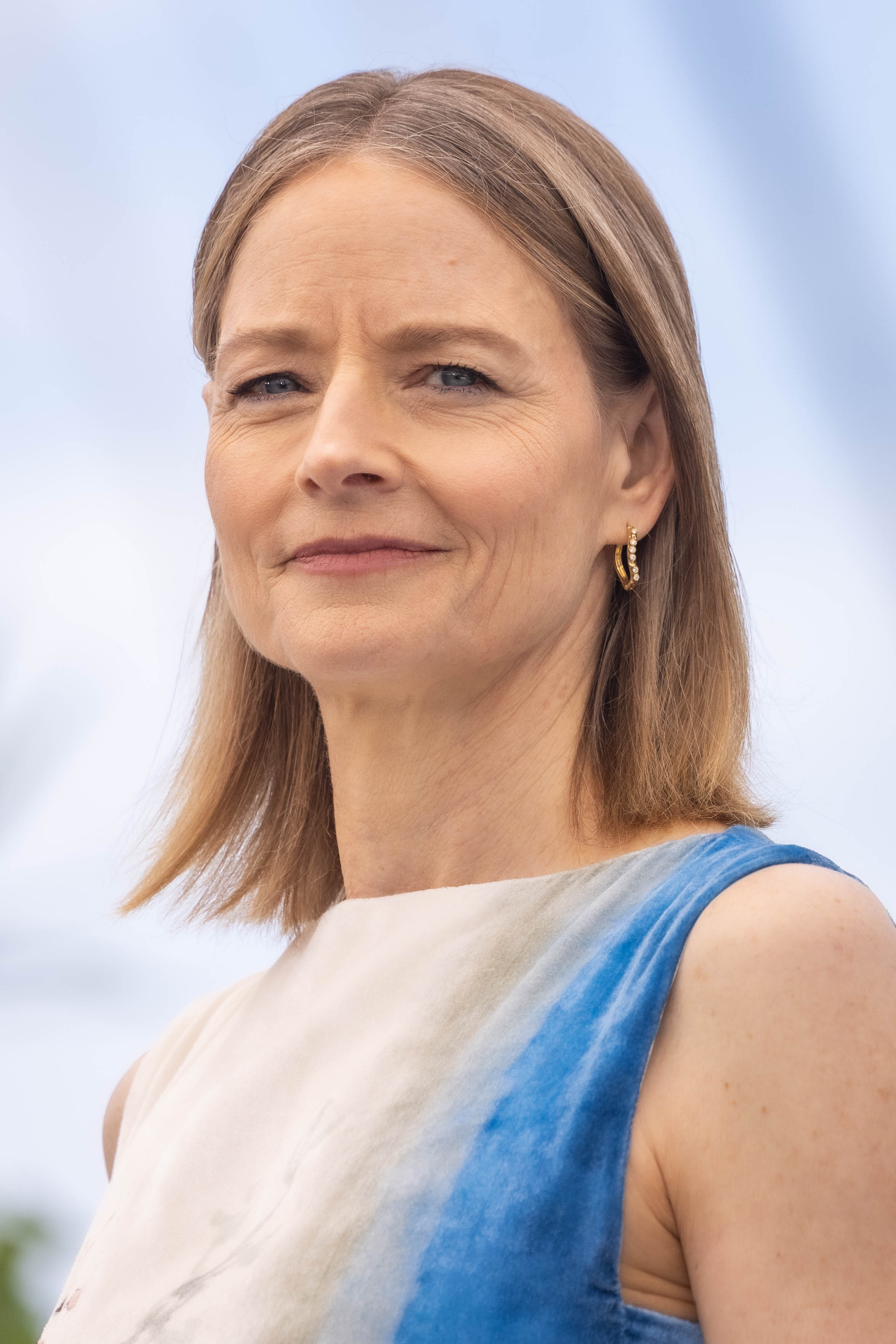
Jodie Foster won for The Mauritanian (2020)

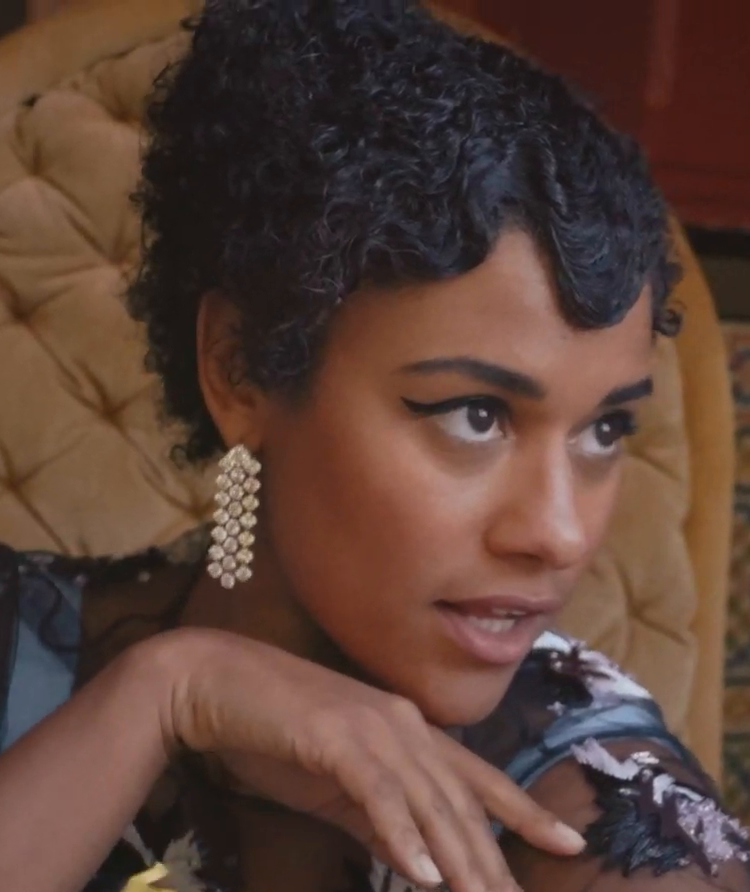
Ariana DeBose won for West Side Story (2021)

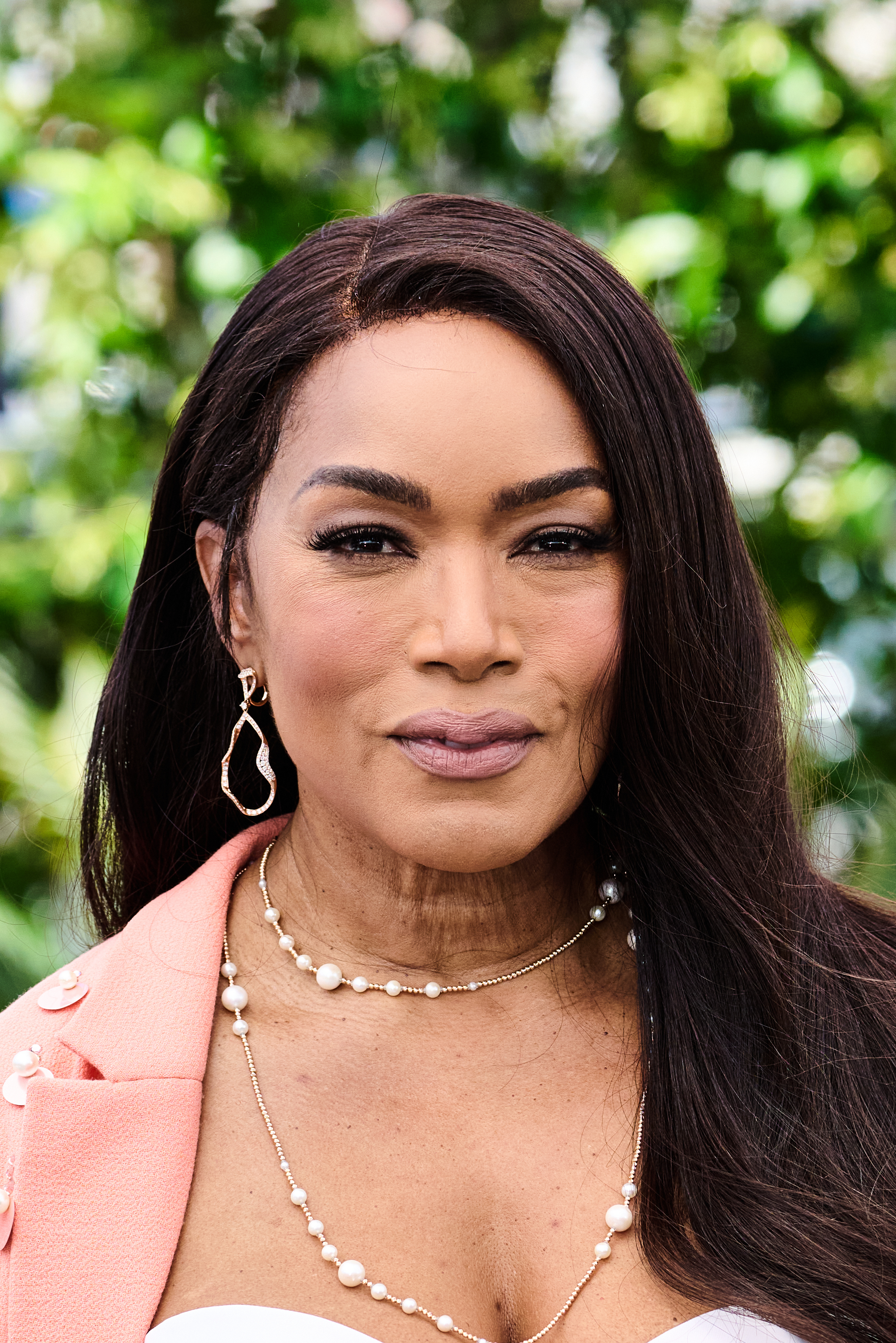
Angela Bassett won for Black Panther: Wakanda Forever (2022)

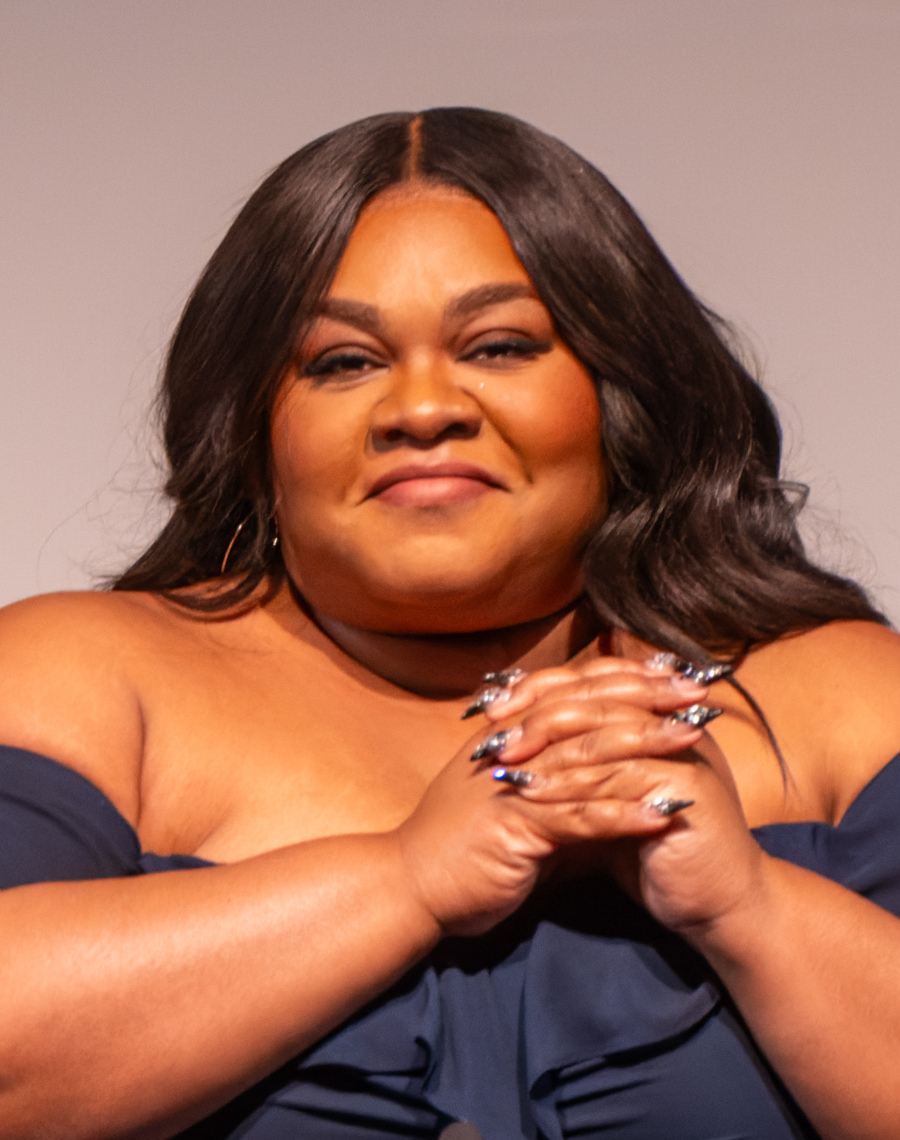
Da'Vine Joy Randolph won for The Holdovers (2023)

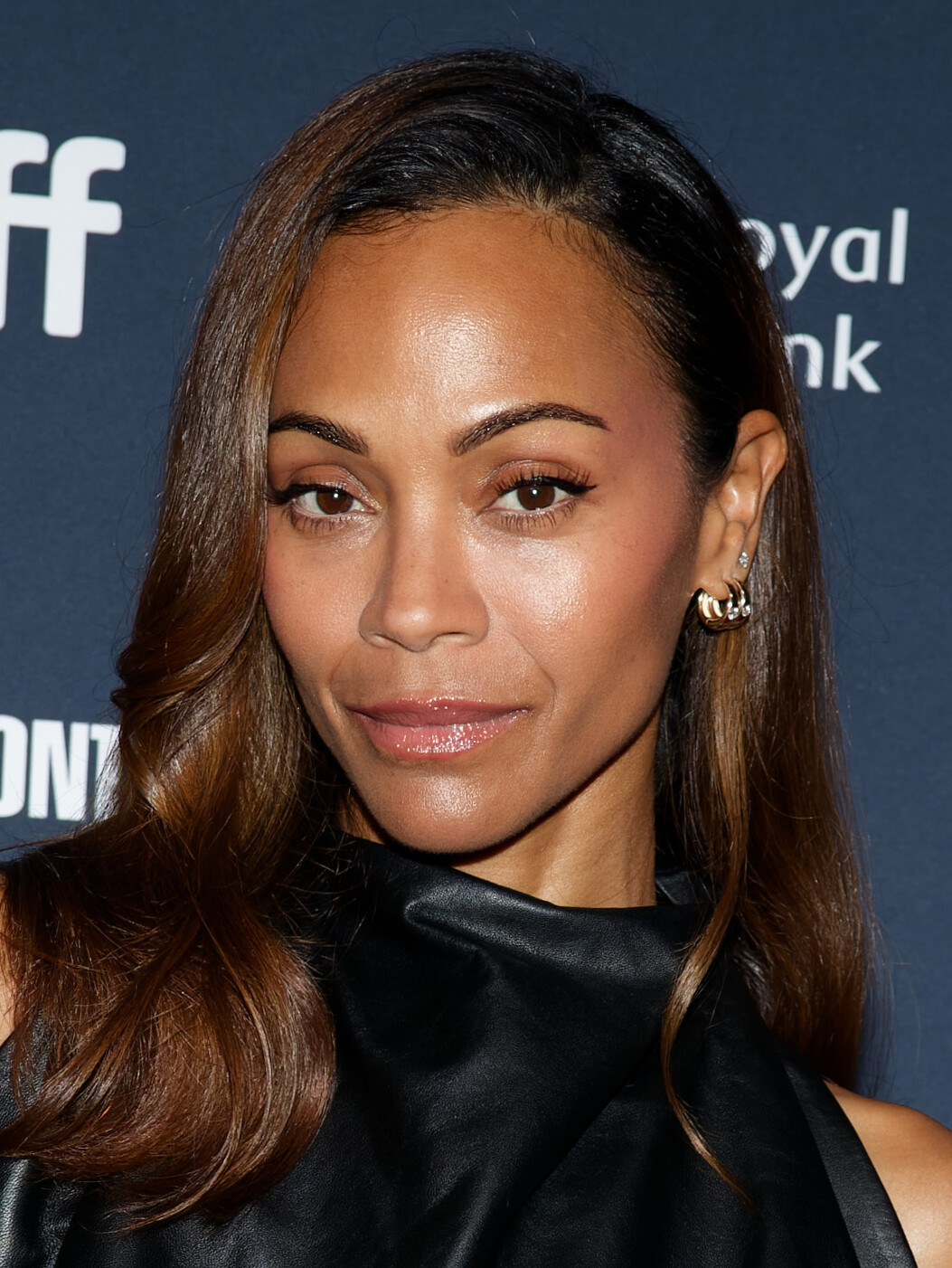
Zoe Saldaña won for Emilia Pérez (2024)

=== 1940s ===
Year	Actress	Role(s)	Film	Ref.
1943	Katina Paxinou	Pilar	For Whom the Bell Tolls	
1944	Agnes Moorehead	Baroness Aspasia Conti	Mrs. Parkington	
1945	Angela Lansbury	Sibyl Vane	The Picture of Dorian Gray	
1946	Anne Baxter	Sophie MacDonald	The Razor's Edge	
1947	Celeste Holm	Anne Dettrey	Gentleman's Agreement	
1948	Ellen Corby	Aunt Trina	I Remember Mama	
1949	Mercedes McCambridge	Sadie Burke	All the King's Men	
1949	Miriam Hopkins	Lavinia Penniman	The Heiress	

=== 1950s ===
Year	Actress	Role(s)	Film	Ref.
1950	Josephine Hull	Veta Louise Simmons	Harvey	
1950	Judy Holliday	Doris Attinger	Adam's Rib	
1950	Thelma Ritter	Birdie Kumen	All About Eve	
1951	Kim Hunter	Stella Kowalski	A Streetcar Named Desire	
1951	Lee Grant	Shoplifter	Detective Story	
1951	Thelma Ritter	Ellen McNulty	The Mating Season	
1952	Katy Jurado	Helen Ramirez	High Noon	
1952	Mildred Dunnock	Señora Espejo	Viva Zapata!	
1952	Gloria Grahame	Rosemary Bartlow	The Bad and the Beautiful	
1953	Grace Kelly	Linda Nordley	Mogambo	
1954	Jan Sterling	Sally McKee	The High and the Mighty	
1955	Marisa Pavan	Rosa Delle Rose	The Rose Tattoo	
1956	Eileen Heckart	Hortense Daigle	The Bad Seed	
1956	Mildred Dunnock	Aunt Rose Comfort	Baby Doll	
1956	Marjorie Main	The Widow Hudspeth	Friendly Persuasion	
1956	Dorothy Malone	Marylee Hadley	Written on the Wind	
1956	Patty McCormack	Rhoda Penmark	The Bad Seed	
1957	Elsa Lanchester	Miss Plimsoll	Witness for the Prosecution	
1957	Mildred Dunnock	Miss Elsie Thornton	Peyton Place	
1957	Hope Lange	Selena Cross	Peyton Place	
1957	Heather Sears	Esther Costello	The Story of Esther Costello	
1957	Miyoshi Umeki	Katsumi Kelly	Sayonara	
1958	Hermione Gingold	Madame Alvarez	Gigi	
1958	Peggy Cass	Agnes Gooch	Auntie Mame	
1958	Wendy Hiller	Pat Cooper	Separate Tables	
1958	Maureen Stapleton	Fay Doyle	Lonelyhearts	
1958	Cara Williams	Billy's Mother	The Defiant Ones	
1959	Susan Kohner	Sarah Jane (age 18)	Imitation of Life	
1959	Edith Evans	Rev. Mother Emmanuel (Belgium)	The Nun's Story	
1959	Estelle Hemsley	Grandma 'Gram' Martin	Take a Giant Step	
1959	Juanita Moore	Annie Johnson	Imitation of Life	
1959	Shelley Winters	Petronella Van Daan	The Diary of Anne Frank	

=== 1960s ===
Year	Actress	Role(s)	Film	Ref.
1960	Janet Leigh	Marion Crane	Psycho	
1960	Ina Balin	Natalie Benzinger	From the Terrace	
1960	Shirley Jones	Lulu Bains	Elmer Gantry	
1960	Shirley Knight	Reenie Flood	The Dark at the Top of the Stairs	
1960	Mary Ure	Clara Dawes	Sons and Lovers	
1961	Rita Moreno	Anita	West Side Story	
1961	Fay Bainter	Amelia Tilford	The Children's Hour	
1961	Judy Garland	Irene Hoffman Wallner	Judgment at Nuremberg	
1961	Lotte Lenya	Contessa	The Roman Spring of Mrs. Stone	
1961	Pamela Tiffin	Scarlett Hazeltine	One, Two, Three	
1962	Angela Lansbury	Mrs. Iselin	The Manchurian Candidate	
1962	Patty Duke	Helen Keller	The Miracle Worker	
1962	Hermione Gingold	Eulalie Mackechnie Shinn	The Music Man	
1962	Shirley Knight	Heavenly Finley	Sweet Bird of Youth	
1962	Susan Kohner	Martha Freud	Freud: The Secret Passion	
1962	Gabriella Pallotta	Rosalba Massimo	The Pigeon That Took Rome	
1962	Martha Raye	Lulu	Billy Rose's Jumbo	
1962	Kaye Stevens	Nurse Didi	The Interns	
1962	Jessica Tandy	Mrs. Adams	Hemingway's Adventures of a Young Man	
1962	Tarita Teriipaia	Maimiti	Mutiny on the Bounty	
1963	Margaret Rutherford	The Duchess of Brighton	The V.I.P.s	
1963	Diane Baker	Emily Stratman	The Prize	
1963	Joan Greenwood	Lady Bellaston	Tom Jones	
1963	Wendy Hiller	Anna Berniers	Toys in the Attic	
1963	Linda Marsh	Thomna Sinnikoglou	America America	
1963	Patricia Neal	Alma Brown	Hud	
1963	Liselotte Pulver	Sonya	A Global Affair	
1963	Lilia Skala	Mother Maria	Lilies of the Field	
1964	Agnes Moorehead	Velma Cruther	Hush… Hush, Sweet Charlotte	
1964	Elizabeth Ashley	Monica Winthrop	The Carpetbaggers	
1964	Grayson Hall	Judith Fellowes	The Night of the Iguana	
1964	Lila Kedrova	Madame Hortense	Zorba the Greek	
1964	Ann Sothern	Sue Ellen Gamadge	The Best Man	
1965	Ruth Gordon	Mrs. Clover / The Dealer	Inside Daisy Clover	
1965	Joan Blondell	Lady Fingers	The Cincinnati Kid	
1965	Joyce Redman	Emilia	Othello	
1965	Thelma Ritter	Bertha	Boeing Boeing	
1965	Peggy Wood	Mother Abbess	The Sound of Music	
1966	Jocelyne LaGarde	Queen Malama	Hawaii	
1966	Vivien Merchant	Lily	Alfie	
1966	Shelley Winters	Ruby	Alfie	
1966	Sandy Dennis	Honey	Who's Afraid of Virginia Woolf?	
1966	Geraldine Page	Margery Chanticleer	You're a Big Boy Now	
1967	Carol Channing	Muzzy Van Hossmere	Thoroughly Modern Millie	
1967	Quentin Dean	Delores Purdy	In the Heat of the Night	
1967	Lee Grant	Leslie Colbert	In the Heat of the Night	
1967	Lillian Gish	Mrs. Smith	The Comedians	
1967	Prunella Ransome	Fanny Robin	Far from the Madding Crowd	
1967	Beah Richards	Mrs. Prentice	Guess Who's Coming to Dinner	
1968	Ruth Gordon	Minnie Castevet	Rosemary's Baby	
1968	Barbara Hancock	Susan the Silent	Finian's Rainbow	
1968	Abbey Lincoln	Ivy Moore	For Love of Ivy	
1968	Sondra Locke	Mick Kelly	The Heart Is a Lonely Hunter	
1968	Jane Merrow	Alys, Countess of the Vexin	The Lion in Winter	
1969	Goldie Hawn	Toni Simmons	Cactus Flower	
1969	Marianne McAndrew	Irene Molloy	Hello, Dolly!	
1969	Siân Phillips	Ursula Mossbank	Goodbye, Mr. Chips	
1969	Brenda Vaccaro	Shirley	Midnight Cowboy	
1969	Susannah York	Alice LeBlanc	They Shoot Horses, Don't They?	

=== 1970s ===
Year	Actress	Role(s)	Film	Ref.
1970	Karen Black	Rayette Dipesto	Five Easy Pieces	
1970	Maureen Stapleton	Inez Guerrero	Airport	
1970	Tina Chen	Nyuk Tsin	The Hawaiians	
1970	Lee Grant	Joyce Enders	The Landlord	
1970	Sally Kellerman	Margaret O'Houlihan	M*A*S*H	
1971	Ann-Margret	Bobbie	Carnal Knowledge	
1971	Ellen Burstyn	Lois Farrow	The Last Picture Show	
1971	Cloris Leachman	Ruth Popper	The Last Picture Show	
1971	Diana Rigg	Barbara Drummond	The Hospital	
1971	Maureen Stapleton	Karen Nash	Plaza Suite	
1972	Shelley Winters	Belle Rosen	The Poseidon Adventure	
1972	Marisa Berenson	Natalia Landauer	Cabaret	
1972	Jeannie Berlin	Lila Kolodny	The Heartbreak Kid	
1972	Helena Kallianiotes	Jackie Burdette	Kansas City Bomber	
1972	Geraldine Page	Gertrude	Pete 'n' Tillie	
1973	Linda Blair	Regan MacNeil	The Exorcist	
1973	Valentina Cortese	Severine	Day for Night	
1973	Madeline Kahn	Trixie Delight	Paper Moon	
1973	Kate Reid	Claire	A Delicate Balance	
1973	Sylvia Sidney	Mrs. Pritchett	Summer Wishes, Winter Dreams	
1974	Karen Black	Myrtle Wilson	The Great Gatsby	
1974	Beatrice Arthur	Vera Charles	Mame	
1974	Jennifer Jones	Lisolette Mueller	The Towering Inferno	
1974	Madeline Kahn	Elizabeth	Young Frankenstein	
1974	Diane Ladd	Flo Castleberry	Alice Doesn't Live Here Anymore	
1975	Brenda Vaccaro	Linda Riggs	Jacqueline Susann's Once Is Not Enough	
1975	Ronee Blakley	Barbara Jean	Nashville	
1975	Geraldine Chaplin	Opal	Nashville	
1975	Barbara Harris	Albuquerque	Nashville	
1975	Lily Tomlin	Linnea Reese	Nashville	
1975	Lee Grant	Felicia Karpf	Shampoo	
1976	Katharine Ross	Mira Hauser	Voyage of the Damned	
1976	Lee Grant	Lili Rosen	Voyage of the Damned	
1976	Jodie Foster	Iris Steensma	Taxi Driver	
1976	Marthe Keller	Elsa Opel	Marathon Man	
1976	Piper Laurie	Margaret White	Carrie	
1976	Bernadette Peters	Vilma Kaplan	Silent Movie	
1976	Shelley Winters	Fay Lapinsky	Next Stop, Greenwich Village	
1977	Vanessa Redgrave	Julia	Julia	
1977	Ann-Margret	Lady Booby	Joseph Andrews	
1977	Joan Blondell	Sarah Goode	Opening Night	
1977	Leslie Browne	Emilia Rodgers	The Turning Point	
1977	Quinn Cummings	Lucy McFadden	The Goodbye Girl	
1977	Lilia Skala	Rosa	Roseland	
1978	Dyan Cannon	Julia Farnsworth	Heaven Can Wait	
1978	Carol Burnett	Tulip Brenner	A Wedding	
1978	Maureen Stapleton	Pearl	Interiors	
1978	Meryl Streep	Linda	The Deer Hunter	
1978	Mona Washbourne	Aunt	Stevie	
1979	Meryl Streep	Joanna Kramer	Kramer vs. Kramer	
1979	Jane Alexander	Margaret Phelps	Kramer vs. Kramer	
1979	Kathleen Beller	Elizabeth (Buffy) Koenig	Promises in the Dark	
1979	Candice Bergen	Jessica Potter	Starting Over	
1979	Valerie Harper	Faye Medwick	Chapter Two	

=== 1980s ===
Year	Actress	Role(s)	Film	Ref.
1980	Mary Steenburgen	Lynda Dummar	Melvin and Howard	
1980	Lucie Arnaz	Molly Bell	The Jazz Singer	
1980	Beverly D'Angelo	Patsy Cline	Coal Miner's Daughter	
1980	Cathy Moriarty	Vicki LaMotta	Raging Bull	
1980	Debra Winger	Sissy Davis	Urban Cowboy	
1981	Joan Hackett	Toby Landau	Only When I Laugh	
1981	Kristy McNichol	Polly Hines	Only When I Laugh	
1981	Jane Fonda	Chelsea Thayer Wayne	On Golden Pond	
1981	Maureen Stapleton	Emma Goldman	Reds	
1981	Mary Steenburgen	Mother	Ragtime	
1982	Jessica Lange	Julie Nichols	Tootsie	
1982	Cher	Sissy	Come Back to the 5 & Dime, Jimmy Dean, Jimmy Dean	
1982	Lainie Kazan	Belle Carroca	My Favorite Year	
1982	Kim Stanley	Lillian Farmer	Frances	
1982	Lesley Ann Warren	Norma Cassady	Victor/Victoria	
1983	Cher	Dolly Pelliker	Silkwood	
1983	Barbara Carrera	Fatima Blush	Never Say Never Again	
1983	Tess Harper	Rosa Lee	Tender Mercies	
1983	Linda Hunt	Billy Kwan	The Year of Living Dangerously	
1983	Joanna Pacuła	Irina Asanova	Gorky Park	
1984	Peggy Ashcroft	Mrs. Moore	A Passage to India	
1984	Drew Barrymore	Casey Brodsky	Irreconcilable Differences	
1984	Kim Basinger	Memo Paris	The Natural	
1984	Jacqueline Bisset	Yvonne Firmin	Under the Volcano	
1984	Melanie Griffith	Holly Body	Body Double	
1984	Christine Lahti	Hazel Zanussi	Swing Shift	
1984	Lesley Ann Warren	Gilda	Songwriter	
1985	Meg Tilly	Sister Agnes	Agnes of God	
1985	Sônia Braga	Leni Lamaison / Marta / Spider Woman	Kiss of the Spider Woman	
1985	Anjelica Huston	Maerose Prizzi	Prizzi's Honor	
1985	Amy Madigan	Sunny Mackenzie-Sobel	Twice in a Lifetime	
1985	Kelly McGillis	Rachel Lapp	Witness	
1985	Oprah Winfrey	Sofia Johnson	The Color Purple	
1986	Maggie Smith	Charlotte Bartlett	A Room with a View	
1986	Linda Kozlowski	Sue Charlton	Crocodile Dundee	
1986	Mary Elizabeth Mastrantonio	Carmen	The Color of Money	
1986	Cathy Tyson	Simone	Mona Lisa	
1986	Dianne Wiest	Holly	Hannah and Her Sisters	
1987	Olympia Dukakis	Rose Castorini	Moonstruck	
1987	Norma Aleandro	Florencia	Gaby: A True Story	
1987	Anne Archer	Beth Gallagher	Fatal Attraction	
1987	Anne Ramsey	Mrs. Lift	Throw Momma from the Train	
1987	Vanessa Redgrave	Peggy Ramsay	Prick Up Your Ears	
1988	Sigourney Weaver	Katharine Parker	Working Girl	
1988	Sônia Braga	Madonna Mendez	Moon Over Parador	
1988	Barbara Hershey	Mary Magdalene	The Last Temptation of Christ	
1988	Lena Olin	Sabina	The Unbearable Lightness of Being	
1988	Diane Venora	Chan Parker	Bird	
1989	Julia Roberts	Shelby Eatenton Latcherie	Steel Magnolias	
1989	Bridget Fonda	Mandy Rice-Davies	Scandal	
1989	Brenda Fricker	Mrs. Brown	My Left Foot	
1989	Laura San Giacomo	Cynthia Bishop	Sex, Lies, and Videotape	
1989	Dianne Wiest	Helen Buckman	Parenthood	

=== 1990s ===
Year	Actress	Role(s)	Film	Ref.
1990	Whoopi Goldberg	Oda Mae Brown	Ghost	
1990	Lorraine Bracco	Karen Hill	Goodfellas	
1990	Diane Ladd	Marietta Fortune	Wild at Heart	
1990	Shirley MacLaine	Doris Mann	Postcards from the Edge	
1990	Mary McDonnell	Stands With a Fist	Dances with Wolves	
1990	Winona Ryder	Charlotte Flax	Mermaids	
1991	Mercedes Ruehl	Anne Napolitano	The Fisher King	
1991	Nicole Kidman	Drew Preston	Billy Bathgate	
1991	Diane Ladd	Mother	Rambling Rose	
1991	Juliette Lewis	Danielle Bowden	Cape Fear	
1991	Jessica Tandy	Ninny Threadgoode	Fried Green Tomatoes	
1992	Joan Plowright	Mrs. Fisher	Enchanted April	
1992	Geraldine Chaplin	Hannah Chaplin	Chaplin	
1992	Judy Davis	Sally	Husbands and Wives	
1992	Miranda Richardson	Ingrid Fleming	Damage	
1992	Alfre Woodard	Chantelle	Passion Fish	
1993	Winona Ryder	May Welland	The Age of Innocence	
1993	Penelope Ann Miller	Gail	Carlito's Way	
1993	Anna Paquin	Flora McGrath	The Piano	
1993	Rosie Perez	Carla Rodrigo	Fearless	
1993	Emma Thompson	Gareth Peirce	In the Name of the Father	
1994	Dianne Wiest	Helen Sinclair	Bullets over Broadway	
1994	Kirsten Dunst	Claudia	Interview with the Vampire	
1994	Sophia Loren	Isabella de la Fontaine	Prêt-à-Porter	
1994	Uma Thurman	Mia Wallace	Pulp Fiction	
1994	Robin Wright	Jenny Curran	Forrest Gump	
1995	Mira Sorvino	Linda Ash	Mighty Aphrodite	
1995	Anjelica Huston	Mary	The Crossing Guard	
1995	Kathleen Quinlan	Marilyn Lovell	Apollo 13	
1995	Kyra Sedgwick	Emma Rae King	Something to Talk About	
1995	Kate Winslet	Marianne Dashwood	Sense and Sensibility	
1996	Lauren Bacall	Hannah Morgan	The Mirror Has Two Faces	
1996	Joan Allen	Elizabeth Proctor	The Crucible	
1996	Juliette Binoche	Hana	The English Patient	
1996	Barbara Hershey	Madame Serena Merle	The Portrait of a Lady	
1996	Marianne Jean-Baptiste	Hortense Cumberbatch	Secrets & Lies	
1996	Marion Ross	Rosie Dunlop	The Evening Star	
1997	Kim Basinger	Lynn Bracken	L.A. Confidential	
1997	Joan Cusack	Emily Montgomery	In & Out	
1997	Julianne Moore	Amber Waves	Boogie Nights	
1997	Gloria Stuart	Rose Calvert	Titanic	
1997	Sigourney Weaver	Janey Carver	The Ice Storm	
1998	Lynn Redgrave	Hanna	Gods and Monsters	
1998	Kathy Bates	Libby Holden	Primary Colors	
1998	Brenda Blethyn	Mari Hoff	Little Voice	
1998	Judi Dench	Queen Elizabeth I	Shakespeare in Love	
1998	Sharon Stone	Gwen Dillon	The Mighty	
1999	Angelina Jolie	Lisa Rowe	Girl, Interrupted	
1999	Cameron Diaz	Lotte Schwartz	Being John Malkovich	
1999	Catherine Keener	Maxine Lund	Being John Malkovich	
1999	Samantha Morton	Hattie	Sweet and Lowdown	
1999	Natalie Portman	Ann August	Anywhere But Here	
1999	Chloë Sevigny	Lana Tisdel	Boys Don't Cry	

=== 2000s ===
Year	Actress	Role(s)	Film	Ref.
2000	Kate Hudson	Penny Lane	Almost Famous	
2000	Judi Dench	Armande Voizin	Chocolat	
2000	Frances McDormand	Elaine Miller	Almost Famous	
2000	Julie Walters	Sandra Wilkinson	Billy Elliot	
2000	Catherine Zeta-Jones	Helena Ayala	Traffic	
2001	Jennifer Connelly	Alicia Nash	A Beautiful Mind	
2001	Helen Mirren	Mrs. Wilson	Gosford Park	
2001	Maggie Smith	Constance Trentham	Gosford Park	
2001	Cameron Diaz	Julie Gianni	Vanilla Sky	
2001	Marisa Tomei	Natalie Strout	In the Bedroom	
2001	Kate Winslet	Iris Murdoch	Iris	
2002	Meryl Streep	Susan Orlean	Adaptation.	
2002	Kathy Bates	Roberta Hertzel	About Schmidt	
2002	Cameron Diaz	Jenny Everdeane	Gangs of New York	
2002	Queen Latifah	Matron "Mama" Morton	Chicago	
2002	Susan Sarandon	Mimi Slocumb	Igby Goes Down	
2003	Renée Zellweger	Ruby Thewes	Cold Mountain	
2003	Maria Bello	Natalie Belisario	The Cooler	
2003	Patricia Clarkson	Joy Burns	Pieces of April	
2003	Hope Davis	Joyce Brabner	American Splendor	
2003	Holly Hunter	Melanie Freeland	Thirteen	
2004	Natalie Portman	Alice Ayres / Jane Jones	Closer	
2004	Cate Blanchett	Katharine Hepburn	The Aviator	
2004	Laura Linney	Clara McMillen	Kinsey	
2004	Virginia Madsen	Maya Randall	Sideways	
2004	Meryl Streep	Eleanor Shaw	The Manchurian Candidate	
2005	Rachel Weisz	Tessa Quayle	The Constant Gardener	
2005	Scarlett Johansson	Nola Rice	Match Point	
2005	Shirley MacLaine	Ella Hirsch	In Her Shoes	
2005	Frances McDormand	Glory Dodge	North Country	
2005	Michelle Williams	Alma Beers Del Mar	Brokeback Mountain	
2006	Jennifer Hudson	Effie White	Dreamgirls	
2006	Adriana Barraza	Amelia Hernandez	Babel	
2006	Rinko Kikuchi	Chieko Wataya	Babel	
2006	Cate Blanchett	Sheba Hart	Notes on a Scandal	
2006	Emily Blunt	Emily Charlton	The Devil Wears Prada	
2007	Cate Blanchett	Jude Quinn	I'm Not There	
2007	Julia Roberts	Joanne Herring	Charlie Wilson's War	
2007	Saoirse Ronan	Briony Tallis	Atonement	
2007	Amy Ryan	Helene McCready	Gone Baby Gone	
2007	Tilda Swinton	Karen Crowder	Michael Clayton	
2008	Kate Winslet	Hanna Schmitz	The Reader	
2008	Amy Adams	Sister James	Doubt	
2008	Viola Davis	Mrs. Miller	Doubt	
2008	Penélope Cruz	María Elena	Vicky Cristina Barcelona	
2008	Marisa Tomei	Cassidy / Pam	The Wrestler	
2009	Mo'Nique	Mary Lee Johnston	Precious	
2009	Vera Farmiga	Alex Goran	Up in the Air	
2009	Anna Kendrick	Natalie Keener	Up in the Air	
2009	Penélope Cruz	Carla Albanese	Nine	
2009	Julianne Moore	Charley Miller	A Single Man	

=== 2010s ===
Year	Actress	Role(s)	Film	Ref.
2010	Melissa Leo	Alice Eklund-Ward	The Fighter	
2010	Amy Adams	Charlene Fleming	The Fighter	
2010	Helena Bonham Carter	Queen Elizabeth	The King's Speech	
2010	Mila Kunis	Lily / The Black Swan	Black Swan	
2010	Jacki Weaver	Janine "Smurf" Cody	Animal Kingdom	
2011	Octavia Spencer	Minny Jackson	The Help	
2011	Bérénice Bejo	Peppy Miller	The Artist	
2011	Jessica Chastain	Celia Foote	The Help	
2011	Janet McTeer	Hubert Page	Albert Nobbs	
2011	Shailene Woodley	Alexandra King	The Descendants	
2012	Anne Hathaway	Fantine	Les Misérables	
2012	Amy Adams	Peggy Dodd	The Master	
2012	Sally Field	Mary Todd Lincoln	Lincoln	
2012	Helen Hunt	Cheryl Cohen-Greene	The Sessions	
2012	Nicole Kidman	Charlotte Bless	The Paperboy	
2013	Jennifer Lawrence	Rosalyn Rosenfeld	American Hustle	
2013	Sally Hawkins	Ginger	Blue Jasmine	
2013	Lupita Nyong'o	Patsey	12 Years a Slave	
2013	Julia Roberts	Barbara Weston-Fordham	August: Osage County	
2013	June Squibb	Kate Grant	Nebraska	
2014	Patricia Arquette	Olivia Evans	Boyhood	
2014	Jessica Chastain	Anna Morales	A Most Violent Year	
2014	Keira Knightley	Joan Clarke	The Imitation Game	
2014	Emma Stone	Sam Thomson	Birdman	
2014	Meryl Streep	The Witch	Into the Woods	
2015	Kate Winslet	Joanna Hoffman	Steve Jobs	
2015	Jane Fonda	Brenda Morel	Youth	
2015	Jennifer Jason Leigh	Daisy Domergue	The Hateful Eight	
2015	Helen Mirren	Hedda Hopper	Trumbo	
2015	Alicia Vikander	Ava	Ex Machina	
2016	Viola Davis	Rose Maxson	Fences	
2016	Naomie Harris	Paula Harris	Moonlight	
2016	Nicole Kidman	Sue Brierley	Lion	
2016	Octavia Spencer	Dorothy Vaughan	Hidden Figures	
2016	Michelle Williams	Randi Chandler	Manchester by the Sea	
2017	Allison Janney	LaVona Golden	I, Tonya	
2017	Mary J. Blige	Florence Jackson	Mudbound	
2017	Hong Chau	Ngoc Lan Tran	Downsizing	
2017	Laurie Metcalf	Marion McPherson	Lady Bird	
2017	Octavia Spencer	Zelda Delilah Fuller	The Shape of Water	
2018	Regina King	Sharon Rivers	If Beale Street Could Talk	
2018	Amy Adams	Lynne Cheney	Vice	
2018	Claire Foy	Janet Shearon Armstrong	First Man	
2018	Emma Stone	Abigail	The Favourite	
2018	Rachel Weisz	Lady Sarah	The Favourite	
2019	Laura Dern	Nora Fanshaw	Marriage Story	
2019	Kathy Bates	Barbara "Bobi" Jewell	Richard Jewell	
2019	Annette Bening	Dianne Feinstein	The Report	
2019	Jennifer Lopez	Ramona Vega	Hustlers	
2019	Margot Robbie	Kayla Pospisil	Bombshell	

=== 2020s ===
Year	Actress	Role(s)	Film	Ref.
2020	Jodie Foster	Nancy Hollander	The Mauritanian	
2020	Glenn Close	Bonnie "Mamaw" Vance	Hillbilly Elegy	
2020	Olivia Colman	Anne	The Father	
2020	Amanda Seyfried	Marion Davies	Mank	
2020	Helena Zengel	Johanna Leonberger	News of the World	
2021	Ariana DeBose	Anita	West Side Story	
2021	Caitríona Balfe	Ma	Belfast	
2021	Kirsten Dunst	Rose Burbank	The Power of the Dog	
2021	Aunjanue Ellis-Taylor	Oracene "Brandy" Price	King Richard	
2021	Ruth Negga	Clare Bellew	Passing	
2022	Angela Bassett	Queen Ramonda	Black Panther: Wakanda Forever	
2022	Jamie Lee Curtis	Deirdre Beaubeirdre	Everything Everywhere All at Once	
2022	Kerry Condon	Siobhán Súilleabháin	The Banshees of Inisherin	
2022	Dolly de Leon	Abigail	Triangle of Sadness	
2022	Carey Mulligan	Megan Twohey	She Said	
2023	Da'Vine Joy Randolph	Mary Lamb	The Holdovers	
2023	Emily Blunt	Katherine "Kitty" Oppenheimer	Oppenheimer	
2023	Danielle Brooks	Sofia Johnson	The Color Purple	
2023	Jodie Foster	Bonnie Stoll	Nyad	
2023	Julianne Moore	Gracie Atherton-Yoo	May December	
2023	Rosamund Pike	Lady Elspeth Catton	Saltburn	
2024	Zoe Saldaña	Rita Mora Castro	Emilia Pérez	
2024	Selena Gomez	Jessica "Jessi" del Monte	Emilia Pérez	
2024	Ariana Grande	Galinda Upland	Wicked	
2024	Felicity Jones	Erzsébet Tóth	The Brutalist	
2024	Margaret Qualley	Sue	The Substance	
2024	Isabella Rossellini	Sister Agnes	Conclave	
2025	Teyana Taylor	Perfidia Beverly Hills	One Battle After Another	
2025	Emily Blunt	Dawn Staples	The Smashing Machine	
2025	Elle Fanning	Rachel Kemp	Sentimental Value	
2025	Ariana Grande	Galinda Upland	Wicked: For Good	
2025	Inga Ibsdotter Lilleaas	Agnes Borg Pettersen	Sentimental Value	
2025	Amy Madigan	Gladys	Weapons	

== Multiple nominations ==
5 nominations

- Lee Grant
- Maureen Stapleton
- Meryl Streep

4 nominations

- Amy Adams
- Kate Winslet
- Shelley Winters

3 nominations

- Kathy Bates
- Cate Blanchett
- Emily Blunt
- Cameron Diaz
- Mildred Dunnock
- Jodie Foster
- Nicole Kidman
- Diane Ladd
- Julianne Moore
- Thelma Ritter
- Julia Roberts
- Octavia Spencer
- Dianne Wiest

2 nominations

- Ann-Margret
- Kim Basinger
- Karen Black
- Joan Blondell
- Sonia Braga
- Geraldine Chaplin
- Jessica Chastain
- Cher
- Penélope Cruz
- Viola Davis
- Judi Dench
- Kirsten Dunst
- Jane Fonda
- Hermione Gingold
- Ruth Gordon
- Ariana Grande
- Barbara Hershey
- Anjelica Huston
- Madeline Kahn
- Shirley Knight
- Shirley MacLaine
- Amy Madigan
- Frances McDormand
- Helen Mirren
- Agnes Moorehead
- Geraldine Page
- Natalie Portman
- Vanessa Redgrave
- Winona Ryder
- Lilia Skala
- Maggie Smith
- Mary Steenburgen
- Emma Stone
- Marisa Tomei
- Brenda Vaccaro
- Lesley Ann Warren
- Sigourney Weaver
- Rachel Weisz
- Michelle Williams

== Multiple winners ==
2 wins

- Karen Black
- Ruth Gordon
- Angela Lansbury
- Agnes Moorehead
- Meryl Streep
- Kate Winslet

== See also ==
- Academy Award for Best Supporting Actress
- BAFTA Award for Best Actress in a Supporting Role
- Independent Spirit Award for Best Supporting Female
- Critics' Choice Movie Award for Best Supporting Actress
- Screen Actors Guild Award for Outstanding Performance by a Female Actor in a Supporting Role
