= Jane Johnson =

Jane Johnson may refer to:

- Jane Johnson (actress) (1706–1733), English actress
- Jane Johnson (politician), New Hampshire state representative
- Jane Johnson (slave) (c. 1814–1872), American slave who was center of a precedent-setting legal case
- Jane Johnson (writer, born 1960), English author
- Jane Johnson (18th-century writer) (1706–1759), English writer
- Jane Clayson Johnson (born 1967), American journalist
- Jane Hall Johnson (1919–2001), American engineer and architect

== See also ==
- Jane Johnston Schoolcraft (1800–1842), aka Jane Johnston, first American Indian literary writer
