= Barbara Johnson =

Barbara Johnson may refer to:

- Barbara Johnson (literary critic) (1947–2009), American literary critic and translator
- Barbara Piasecka Johnson (1937–2013), Polish humanitarian, philanthropist, art connoisseur and collector
- Barbara Johnson (athlete) (born 1962), Irish hurdler
- Barbara Johnson (fashion) (1738–1825), English textile collector
- Barbara Crawford Johnson (1925–2005), American aerospace engineer
- Barbara Johnson Tucker, née Johnson, American gospel singer
- Barbara Johnson, Miss Turks and Caicos in 1991
