= Beah Richards =

American actor and writer (1920–2000)

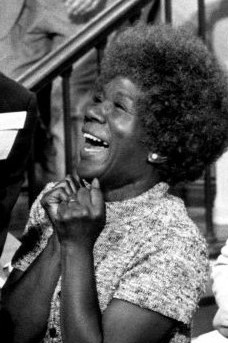
- Richards on The Bill Cosby Show (1970)
- Born: Beulah Elizabeth Richardson; July 12, 1920; Vicksburg, Mississippi, U.S.
- Died: September 14, 2000 (aged 80); Vicksburg, Mississippi, U.S.
- Education: Dillard University
- Occupation: Actress
- Years active: 1955–2000
- Notable work: Guess Who's Coming to Dinner; Roots: The Next Generations
- Spouse: Hugh Harrell Jr. (divorced)

Beulah Elizabeth Richardson (July 12, 1920 – September 14, 2000), known professionally as Beah Richards and Bea Richards, was an American actress of stage, screen, and television. She was also a poet, playwright, author and activist.

Richards was nominated for an Oscar and a Golden Globe for her supporting role in the film Guess Who's Coming to Dinner in 1968, as well as winning two Primetime Emmy Awards for her guest roles in the television series Frank's Place in 1988 and The Practice in 2000. She also received a Tony Award nomination for her performance in the 1965 production of The Amen Corner.

== Early life ==
Beulah Elizabeth Richardson was born in Vicksburg, Mississippi; her mother was a seamstress, and her father was a Baptist minister. In 1948, she graduated from Dillard University in New Orleans, and two years later, she moved to New York City. She was taught dance by Ismay Andrews.

== Career ==
Her career began in 1955, when she portrayed an 84-year-old-grandmother in the off-Broadway show Take a Giant Step. She often played the role of a mother or grandmother, and continued acting her entire life. She appeared in the original Broadway productions of Purlie Victorious, The Miracle Worker, and A Raisin in the Sun.

As a writer, she wrote the verse performance piece A Black Woman Speaks, a collection of 14 poems, in which she points out that white women played an important role in oppressing women of color. The play's first performance was in 1950 for the organization Women for Peace, a white-women's organization in Chicago. The positive reception of her poetry led her to become the cofounder of the civil rights organization Sojourners for Truth and Justice, which used A Black Woman Speaks as a framework for their work. The Sojourners for Truth and Justice drew in other notable activists including Shirley Du Bois, Louise Thompson Patterson, Mary Church Terrell, Claudia Jones, and Audley Moore.

Her first play was written in 1951, titled One Is a Crowd, about a black singer who seeks revenge on a white man who had destroyed her family. It was not produced until decades later.

From the 1930s to the late 1950s, Richards was a member and organizer with the Communist Party USA in Los Angeles, after befriending artist Paul Robeson. She is among the black women who "actively participated in movements affiliated with the CPUSA" between 1917's Bolshevik Revolution and Soviet premier Nikita Khrushchev's 1956 revelations. She was later a sponsor of the National United Committee to Free Angela Davis.

Richards was known professionally as Beah Richards, and is also referred to in several sources as Bea Richards.

Notable movie appearances include The Amen Corner (1965), Guess Who's Coming to Dinner (1967), Hurry Sundown, The Great White Hope, Beloved and In the Heat of the Night. She made numerous guest television appearances, including roles on Frank's Place, Beauty and the Beast, The Bill Cosby Show, 227, Sanford and Son, Benson (playing the title character's mother in two episodes), Designing Women, The Facts of Life, The Practice, Murder, She Wrote, The Big Valley, and ER (as Dr. Peter Benton's mother). She appeared in Roots: The Next Generations as Cynthia Murray Palmer, the grandmother of Alex Haley.

== Recognition and awards ==
Richards was nominated for a Tony Award for her 1965 performance in James Baldwin's The Amen Corner.

She received a nomination for the Academy Award for Best Supporting Actress for her performance as Mrs. Mary Prentice (the mother of Sidney Poitier's character) in Guess Who's Coming to Dinner (1967).

She was the winner of two Emmy Awards, one in 1988 for her appearance on the series Frank's Place and another in 2000 (less than a month before her death) for her appearance on The Practice.

== Death and legacy ==
Richards died from emphysema on September 14, 2000, in her hometown of Vicksburg, Mississippi, less than a month after winning an Emmy Award.

In the last year of her life, Richards was the subject of a documentary created by actress LisaGay Hamilton. The documentary Beah: A Black Woman Speaks was created from over 70 hours of their conversations. The film won the Grand Jury Prize at the AFI Film Festival.

== Filmography ==
Year	Title	Role	Notes
1958	The Mugger	Grecco Maid	
1959	Take a Giant Step	May Scott	
1962	The Miracle Worker	Viney the Maid	Uncredited
1963	Gone Are the Days!	Idella Landy	
1967	Hurry Sundown	Rose Scott	
1967	In the Heat of the Night	Mama Caleba	
1967	Guess Who's Coming to Dinner	Mrs. Prentice	Nominated — Academy Award for Best Supporting Actress; Nominated — Golden Globe Award for Best Supporting Actress – Motion Picture
1970	The Great White Hope	Mama Tiny	NAACP Image Award for Outstanding Supporting Actress in a Motion Picture
1972	The Biscuit Eater	Charity Tomlin	
1973	A Dream For Christmas	Grandma Bessie	
1973	Outrage	Thelma	ABC Movie of the Week
1975	Mahogany	Florence	
1979	Banjo the Woodpile Cat	Zazu	Voice
1986	Inside Out	Verna	
1987	Big Shots	Miss Hanks	
1989	Homer and Eddie	Linda Cervi	
1989	Drugstore Cowboy	Drug Counselor	
1994	Out of Darkness	Mrs. Cooper	
1998	Beloved	Baby Suggs	Nominated — NAACP Image Award for Outstanding Supporting Actress in a Motion Picture

== Awards and nominations ==
Year	Award	Category	Nominated work	Result
1965	Tony Awards	Best Actress in a Play	The Amen Corner	Nominated
1965	Theatre World Awards	Theatre World Award	The Amen Corner	Nominated
1968	Academy Awards	Best Supporting Actress	Guess Who's Coming to Dinner	Nominated
1968	Golden Globe Awards	Best Supporting Actress	Guess Who's Coming to Dinner	Nominated
1970	NAACP Image Awards	Outstanding Supporting Actress in a Motion Picture	The Great White Hope	Won
1988	Primetime Emmy Awards	Outstanding Guest Performer in a Comedy Series	Frank's Place	Won
1999	NAACP Image Awards	Outstanding Supporting Actress in a Motion Picture	Beloved	Nominated
2000	Primetime Emmy Awards	Outstanding Guest Actress in a Drama Series	The Practice	Won
2000	NAACP Image Awards	Outstanding Supporting Actress in a Drama Series	The Practice	Nominated
2000	Online Film & Television Association	Best Guest Actress in a Drama Series	The Practice	Nominated
