= The Great White Hope =

Play written by Howard Sackler

- Book cover of the play
- Original language: English
- Written by: Howard Sackler
- Characters: Jack Jefferson; Eleanor Bachman; Goldie; Tick; Pop Weaver; Dixon; Clara; Cap'n Dan; Al Cameron; Mama Tiny; Scipio
- Subject: Pugilism; racism
- Genre: Drama
- Setting: years before and during WWI

Premiere
- Date: 1967
- Place: Arena Stage; Washington, D.C.

The Great White Hope is a 1967 play written by Howard Sackler, later adapted in 1970 for a film of the same title.

The play was first produced by Arena Stage in Washington, D.C., and debuted on Broadway at the Alvin Theatre in October 1968, directed by Edwin Sherin with James Earl Jones and Jane Alexander in the lead roles. The play won the 1969 Tony Award for Best Play and the 1969 Pulitzer Prize for Drama, with the only singing role as Barbara Johnson Tucker. Subsequent touring companies of the play featured Brock Peters and Claudette Nevins in the lead roles.

The play is based on the true story of Jack Johnson (fictionalized under the character name "Jack Jefferson") and his fight against Jim Jeffries, and also covers the controversy over his marriage to first wife, Etta Terry Duryea, and Duryea's death by suicide in 1912.

== Background ==
While the play is often described as being thematically about racism, this is not how Sackler viewed his work. Though not denying the racist issues confronted in the play, Sackler once said in an interview, "What interested me was not the topicality but the combination of circumstances, the destiny of a man pitted against society. It's a metaphor of struggle between man and the outside world. Some people spoke of the play as if it were a cliché of white liberalism, but I kept to the line straight through, of showing that it wasn't a case of blacks being good and whites being bad. I was appalled at the first reaction."

In a comment reflecting on both the racist theme dealt with in the play and Sackler's notion that the play is about a man fighting society, Muhammad Ali, greatly impressed with James Earl Jones' performance in the play, reportedly commented to the actor, "Hey! This play is about me! Take out the interracial love stuff and Jack Johnson is the original me!" He added, "You just change the time, date and the details and it's about me!" Ali was fighting being drafted into the Army at the time on grounds of being a conscientious objector.

== Productions ==
The Great White Hope premiered at the Arena Stage in December 1967.

The initial production at Arena Stage, paid for in part by two grants from the National Endowment for the Arts, was so well-received that the entire original cast, including James Earl Jones and Jane Alexander, moved to Broadway. It was the first time the cast of a regional theater production was brought to Broadway. The play opened on Broadway on October 3, 1968, and closed on January 31, 1970, after 546 performances. Using proceeds from his screenwriting contract, Sackler substantially funded the Broadway production by investing a reported US$225,000. In addition to winning the Pulitzer Prize for Drama, Jones won the 1969 Tony Award for Best Actor in a Play and Alexander won the 1969 Tony Award for Best Featured Actress in a Play, as well as the Drama Desk Award for each, for their respective portrayals of Jack Jefferson and Eleanor Bachman. A recording of the production was released by Tetragrammaton Records.

Yaphet Kotto replaced Jones and Maria Tucci replaced Alexander on September 8, 1969.

In 2000, Arena Stage mounted a new production of The Great White Hope in honor of the theater's 50th season.

== Film adaptation ==
The Great White Hope was adapted by Sackler for a film released in 1970, directed by Martin Ritt, starring James Earl Jones, Jane Alexander, Chester Morris, Hal Holbrook, Beah Richards and Moses Gunn. Jones and Alexander, who both had starred in the theatrical version, each received Academy Award nominations for their performances. The Oscars for their categories were ultimately presented to George C. Scott for Patton, and Glenda Jackson for Women in Love.

In the movie, the role of "the Kid," or the "great white hope," was played by professional heavyweight boxer James J. Beattie (6'9", 240 pounds), the #10-ranked world heavyweight contender and an Ali sparring partner.

== "The Great White Hope" ==
The term, "the great white hope," reflects the racism and segregation of the era in which Jack Johnson fought. Johnson, the first African American to hold the World Heavyweight Championship title, was one of the best fighters of his generation. Yet, white reaction against Johnson's win and his very public relationships with white women was so strong that, in 1912, the United States Congress, concerned that film scenes of Johnson pummeling white boxers would cause race riots, passed a law making it illegal to transport prizefight films across state lines. "The great white hope" is a reference to the white boxer whom many white people hoped would finally defeat Johnson.

William Warren Barbour, who won the American and Canadian amateur heavyweight championship in 1910 and 1911, respectively, was "Gentleman Jim" Corbett's choice to be "the great white hope," but Barbour declined to take up the mantle. Some thirty years later, it was Barbour who, as U.S. Senator (R) from New Jersey in 1940, worked successfully to repeal the 1912 law prohibiting interstate transportation of boxing film footage. About thirty years after that, William Warren Barbour's nephew, Thomas Barbour, played four small parts, including Sir William Griswald, in the Broadway production of The Great White Hope.

The first "great white hope" boxer to accept the challenge was Jim Jeffries, who came out of retirement to fight Johnson unsuccessfully in 1910. Johnson's title was eventually lost to Jess Willard, a white boxer, in 1915. There was some controversy surrounding Willard's win, with Johnson claiming he threw the fight. In part because of white animosity toward Johnson, it was twenty years before another African-American boxer was allowed to contend for the world professional heavyweight title. In 1937, Joe Louis defeated James J. Braddock, "The Cinderella Man," to become the second African-American boxer to hold the world heavyweight championship title.

== Awards and nominations ==
- 1969 Pulitzer Prize for Drama
- 1969 Tony Award for Best Play (Winner)
- 1969 Tony Award for Best Actor in a Play, James Earl Jones (Winner)
- 1969 Tony Award for Actress, Supporting or Featured (Dramatic), Jane Alexander (Winner)
- 1969 New York Drama Critics' Circle Award for Best Play (Winner)
- 1969 Drama Desk Award for Outstanding Director, Edwin Sherin (Winner)
- 1969 Drama Desk Award Outstanding Performance, James Earl Jones (Winner)
- 1969 Drama Desk Award Outstanding Performance, Jane Alexander (Winner)
- 1970 Grammy Award for Best Spoken Word Recording, James Earl Jones (Nominee)
