= Memoirs of a Female Vagrant =

Memoirs of a female

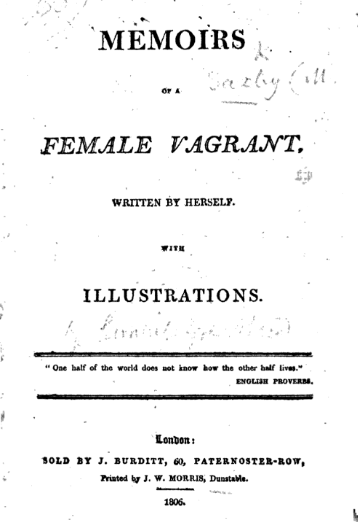
- Author: Mary Saxby
- Publication date: 1806

Mary Saxby's memoirs were published in 1806 with the title Memoirs of a female vagrant, written by herself. With illustrations [and a preface by S. Greatheed]. The memoirs were mainly supplied by her recently widowed daughter, Kezia.

The Reverend Samuel Greatheed of Newport Pagnall was the editor at the request of Joseph Wilson of Islington.

Saxby had died on 20 December 1801 in Olney. Saxby had led an unusual life. She had been educated before running away from her father and step-mother. She left London and lived an itinerant life. She married after her third child and had seven more. She kept a diary until 1794 and maybe after that date. Her daughter believes that she continued her diary after 1794, but if it existed, it was lost by the time that Samuel Greatheed had prepared it for publication. The published book does include an account of her later life but this was as written by Greatheed after questioning Kezia. The book did include an introduction by Greatheed and illustrations.

Her memoirs are an insight into the life of a woman who was not in the middle or upper classes and it is assumed to be largely in her own words. She tells the reader of her opinions for instance she describes gypsies as "semi-savages", and of her conversion to be a Methodist.

== Legacy ==
The publishers chosen were J. Burditt of Paternoster Row and the proceeds of the publication were intended for Kezia who had become a widow. Greatheed was a supporter of the Society for Bettering the Condition and Improving the Comforts of the Poor and he believed that this book might highlight the "vices and miseries of a vagrant life" and encourage charitable donations to mitigate its effects.

This 82 page book represents "one of the few apparently genuine accounts of the experience of itinerancy and poverty in the eighteenth century" and it is said to possibly be the first autobiography written by a homeless person.
