= Mary Saxby =

British vagrant and author

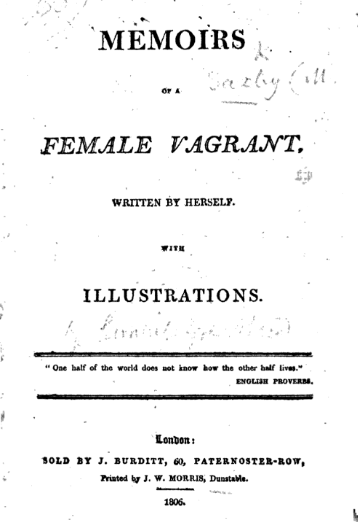
- Title page to her memoirs
- Born: Mary Howell; 1738; London
- Died: 20 December 1801 (aged 62–63); Olney
- Occupation: vagrant
- Known for: her memoirs
- Spouse: John Saxby
- Children: ten

Mary Saxby (née Howell; 1738 – 20 December 1801) was a British vagrant whose writings were published as Memoirs of a female vagrant, written by herself. With illustrations [and a preface by S. Greatheed].

== Life ==
Mary Saxy was born Mary Howell in London in 1738, to Susannah and John Howell. Her mother died in childbirth, and her father worked overseas, so Howell was raised by an uncle. She was educated at Reverend Whitefield's school. A self-described difficult child, she directed her fierce temper at her stepmother after her father remarried. Howell eventually ran away and established a rural life northeast of London. Her survival depended on begging for food and avoiding the advances of men. While itinerant in Bedfordshire, Northamptonshire and Buckinghamshire, she mixed with gypsies and other itinerants. Her travels were interrupted by illness, forcing a temporary return to her father; after recovering, she set out for Kent. There, Howell became the unpaid servant of a gypsy. She described gypsies as "semi-savages". Her rescue came after an acquaintance, John Saxby, fought for her release.

She and John Saxby became lovers, eventually marrying after the birth of their third child. The couple had sought marriage earlier in their relationship, but could not obtain the money necessary for a wedding nor a clergyman to perform one. Finally, a curate in Olney agreed to marry them, and the couple went on to have seven more children. John struggled with alcohol addiction throughout their marriage.

After Mary Saxby converted to Methodism, the text of her memoir took on a new emotional color. She expressed keen interest in meeting houses and the hymns of Charles Wesley. John had been interested mainly in alehouses, but when he died in 1782, he converted on his deathbed. Six of Mary's children also predeceased her.

In 1794, her eighteen-year-old son Thomas drowned while bathing. After his death, Saxby's memoir ends; it is unclear whether she stopped writing or if later additions had been lost by the time of its publication in 1806.

== Death and legacy ==
Saxby died on 20 December 1801 in Olney. In 1806 her memoirs were posthumously published with the title Memoirs of a female vagrant, written by herself. With illustrations [and a preface by S. Greatheed] . The memoirs had been offered to publishers by her daughter, Kezia, and one of her sons.
