= Constance White =

African-American civil rights activist

Constance White was an African American woman who fought against racism and social injustices. She went to the Soviet Union in 1932, accompanied by other Harlem Renaissance members, to make a film that would depict the racial inequalities in the US.

== Family history ==
Newspaper records indicate that Constance White was an only child born in Woburn, Massachusetts, around 1909. Throughout her childhood, she was heavily involved with the American Legion, both as a volunteer and as a service provider, as her father, Albert W. White, was a veteran. She was involved in local affairs and events related to the organization through both of her parents. White's family was of great significant in Woburn.

Constance's father was the first black man to be a commander at Massachusetts' American Legion post and a successful musician. Her grandfather, John White, founded St. John's Baptist Church in Woburn – a historically Black church.

== Early years and activism ==
White moved to Harlem after finishing high school and enrolling for a year at Boston University's predecessor, the Sargent School of Physical Training. Once there, she began interacting with members of the Harlem Renaissance and joining the anti-racist movement.

White participated in the 1938 "love-of-the-great-outdoors" bike trip, which saw five African women go 250 miles over the course of three days from New York City to Washington, D.C. As well as that, she later enrolled in an art school in Harlem.

In 1932, White decided to go on a trip to the Soviet Union, in which Louise Patterson, Langston Hughes and Dorothy West went. The purpose of the trip was to make a film depicting the racial injustices of the United States, in a movie which would be called "Black and White". Nevertheless, due to outside demands and a lack of finance, the movie was never created or even made it to production. Even while it's unclear why White chose to go on the trip, her interactions with activists like Langston Hughes may have had an impact. White aimed to raise awareness of the racial injustice that were taking place in the United States.

Growing up in Boston with Dorothy West and taking part in the Harlem Renaissance social scene in New York gave White her first link to the group that embarked on the trip.

Constance White is depicted in Hassan's biography from 2015 of attorney Loren Miller, who traveled to the Soviet Union.

== Personal life ==
According to Hassan's biography, Constance was described as a lesbian, who had a female partner on the trip, Sylvia Garner. She dated a Russian translator she met while filming Black and White after her relationship with Sylvia.

In Hassan's words, Constance White is described as:

“Homo-sexual YWCA (Young Women’s Christian Association) worker who admires beautiful women and speaks Russian well. Ugly and bulky, she likes to be mistaken for a man and jot down notes to take up time."

== Legacy ==
In her obituary published in her town's newspaper, she is represented as someone who fought against racism through her whole life, participating in protests and movement against racism. White was a local celebrity in Woburn, who made the news after deciding to move to Russian and Germany.

== Bibliography ==
- Powell, Aisha D (2022). A Cultural Historical Analysis of Louise Thompson Patterson, Dorothy West and Constance White in 1932 Russia (Thesis). ProQuest 2722365343.
- Hassan, Amina (2015). Loren Miller: Civil Rights Attorney and Journalist. University of Oklahoma Press. ISBN 978-0-8061-5266-0. OCLC 1335726460.
