= Peter Marshall Murray =

American physician

- Born: June 9, 1888; Houma, Louisiana, U.S.
- Died: December 19, 1969 (aged 81); New York, New York, U.S.
- Occupation: Physician
- Spouse: Charlotte Wallace Murray

Peter Marshall Murray, M.D. (June 9, 1888 – December 19, 1969) was president of the National Medical Association from 1932 to 1933.

In 1931 Murray was the first African-American physician to become a certified Diplomate of the American Board of Obstetrics and Gynecology, and in 1949 he was the first African American to sit in the House of Delegates of the American Medical Association, representing the Medical Society of the County of New York

== Biography ==
He was born on June 9, 1888, in Houma, Louisiana to John L. Murray and Louvinia Smith. He attended Dillard University and graduated in 1910. In 1914 he was awarded his M.D. from Howard University. He interned at Freedmen's Hospital and then taught at Howard University. He served on the Howard University Board of Trustees.

He married Charlotte Wallace in Washington, DC on July 2, 1917. In 1920 they lived in the Truxton Circle neighborhood at 1645 New Jersey Ave NW with Charlotte's mother, her 23-year-old sister, and a live-in domestic servant. Charlotte and her sister Sametta worked as teachers. In July 1921, the Murrays had a son, John. In 1921 the family moved to New York City to live in Harlem.

He became an attending physician at Sydenham Hospital.

In 1956, his portrait was painted by artist Betsy Graves Reyneau. The portrait is currently held by the National Portrait Gallery, Smithsonian Institution as a gift of the Harmon Foundation.

He was president of the National Medical Association from 1932 to 1933. He died on December 19, 1969.
