= Charlotte Wallace Murray =

American singer

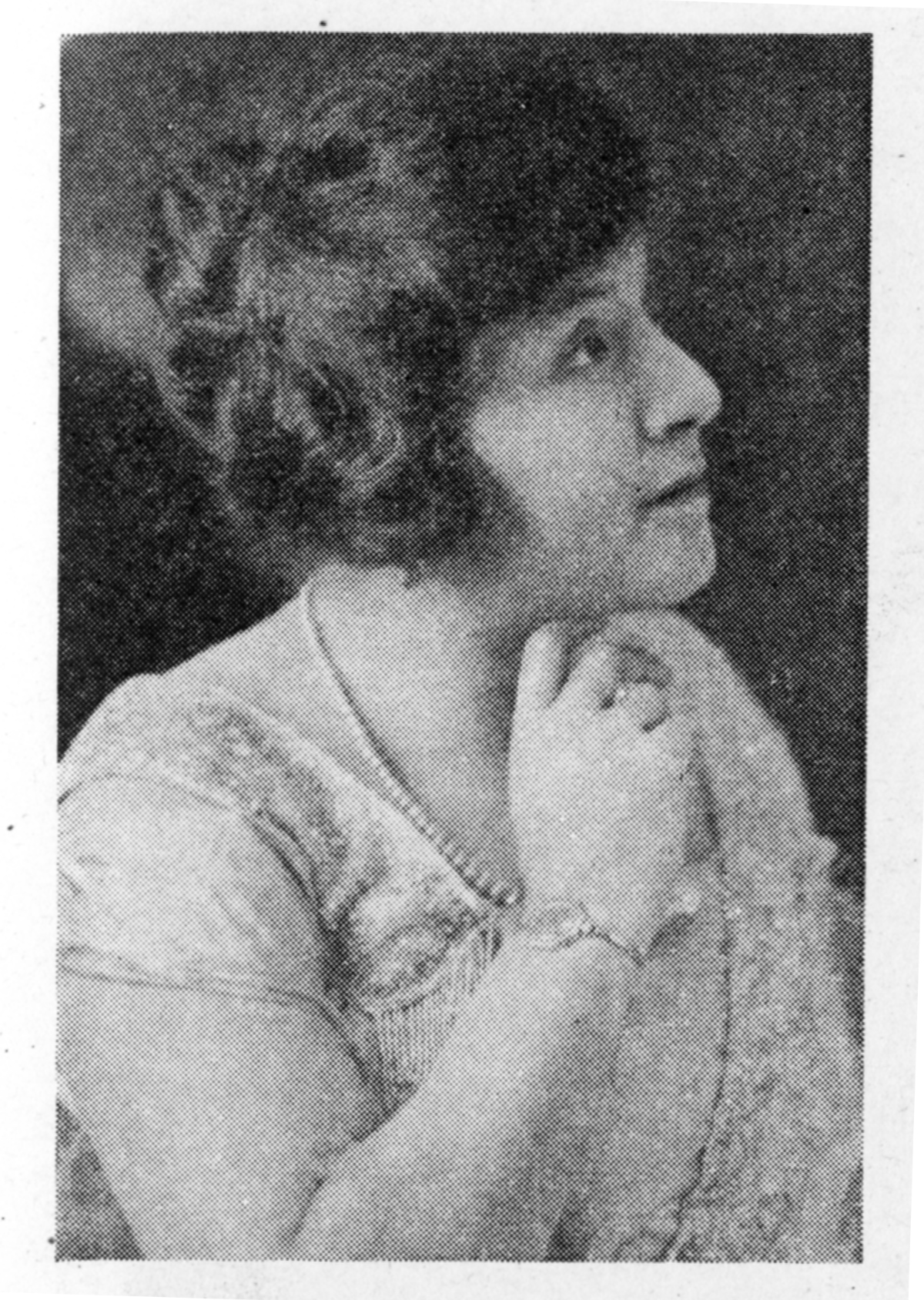
- Charlotte Wallace Murray, from a 1936 publication
- Born: Charlotte M. Wallace; 1885; Columbia, South Carolina, U.S.
- Died: March 13, 1982 (age 97); New York, New York, U.S.
- Occupations: Singer, educator
- Spouse: Peter Marshall Murray

Charlotte M. Wallace Murray (1885 – March 13, 1982) was an American mezzo-soprano or contralto singer, most active in the 1920s and 1930s.

== Early life and education ==
Murray was born in Columbia, South Carolina, and raised in Washington, D.C., the daughter of Samuel B. Wallace and Margaret Ann Butler Wallace. Her father was a minister. She graduated from Minor Normal School in 1905, and from the Institute of Musical Art in New York City in 1931.

== Career ==
Murray was a school teacher in Washington, D.C., before embarking on a career as a concert singer and church singer. Her vocal range was described as mezzo-soprano or contralto. "Mrs. Murray has ample technical resources and her impeccable phrases is aided by clear-cut articulation and intonation," noted an Atlanta newspaper in 1934. "The low register has depth and resonance, the middle voice is smooth, and even her top notes are thrillingly effective."

In 1919 Murray was a soloist in a performance of Handel's Messiah at Howard University, alongside Roland Hayes and Florence Cole Talbert. In 1922 she was one of the demonstrating artists at a lecture on "Negro Spiritual Music and Some Modern Negro Music" given by Augustus Granville Dill for the League for Industrial Democracy in New York City. She made a concert tour in California, Colorado, Nebraska, and Missouri in 1925, with her young son along for the trip.

Murray sang at a Columbia University symposium on Negro music at the Horace Mann School in New York City in summer 1929, and at the annual musical festival of the Interracial Peace Committee in Philadelphia in 1930. She sang at a school in Harlem in 1931, gave a concerts in Washington, D.C., Maryland, and North Carolina in 1934, and sang at a celebration at Cheyney State Teachers College in 1939.

Murray also appeared in operas. She played the Queen in a 1926 production of Deep River, an opera by W. Franke Harling; the cast included Jules Bledsoe and Rose McClendon. In 1932 she was in the cast for the premiere of Tom Tom, an opera by Shirley Graham, based on African music.

In 1940, Murray was public in her support for Wendell Willkie's presidential campaign, as national treasurer of the Colored Women's Wendell Willkie Committee. She was president of the Lincoln University Ladies' Auxiliary in New York City in the 1940s. She sang in the choir at Riverside Church, and was on the executive committee of the Hymn Society of America.

== Personal life ==
Charlotte Wallace married physician Peter Marshall Murray in 1917. They had a son, John, and moved to New York City in 1921. Her husband died in 1969, and she died in 1982, at the age of 97, at a hospital in New York City.
