= The Great White Hope (film) =

1970 film by Martin Ritt

- Theatrical release poster
- Directed by: Martin Ritt
- Screenplay by: Howard Sackler
- Based on: The Great White Hope (1967 play) by Howard Sackler
- Produced by: Lawrence Turman
- Starring: James Earl Jones; Jane Alexander
- Cinematography: Burnett Guffey
- Edited by: William Reynolds
- Music by: Lionel Newman
- Production company: Lawrence Turman Films
- Distributed by: 20th Century Fox
- Release date: October 11, 1970
- Running time: 103 minutes
- Country: United States
- Language: English
- Budget: $9.87 million
- Box office: $9.325 million (rentals)

The Great White Hope is a 1970 American biographical romantic drama film directed by Martin Ritt, adapted by Howard Sackler from his 1967 play. It stars James Earl Jones and Jane Alexander, reprising their roles from the stage production, along with Chester Morris, Hal Holbrook, Beah Richards and Moses Gunn. The film and play are based on the true story of African American boxer Jack Johnson (fictionalized as 'Jack Jefferson') and his first wife, Etta Terry Duryea, and the controversy over their interracial marriage and Duryea's death by suicide in 1912.

The film was released by 20th Century Fox on October 11, 1970. It received positive reviews from critics, earning Academy Award nominations for Best Actor (for Jones) and Best Actress (Alexander). Jones also won the Golden Globe Award for Most Promising Newcomer – Male.

== Plot ==
Set between 1910 and 1915, the story follows Jack Jefferson, going on a hot streak of victories in the boxing ring as he defeats every white boxer around. Soon the press and others who want to see white people win at sports, announce the search for a "great white hope", a white boxer who will defeat Jefferson for the heavyweight title.

Jefferson, meanwhile, prepares for a few more matches, but he lets his guard down by courting the beautiful, and white, Eleanor Bachman, and when everyone, including Jack's black "wife", discover this, the tensions grow to fever pitch. Jack's close black friends become scared over his pushing the envelope of success and the white authorities conspire to frame him for unlawful sexual relations with Eleanor and thereby take away his title. It leads to jealousy, a run from the law, and finally, tragedy.

== Cast ==
- James Earl Jones as Jack Jefferson
- Jane Alexander as Eleanor Bachman
- Chester Morris as Pop Weaver
- Hal Holbrook as Al Cameron
- Beah Richards as Mama Tiny
- Moses Gunn as Scipio
- Lou Gilbert as "Goldie"
- Robert Webber as Dixon
- Marlene Warfield as Clara
- Rockne Tarkington as Rudy
- Jim Beattie as The Kid

== Reception ==
=== Box office ===
According to Fox records, the film required $16,075,000 in rentals to break even. By December 11, 1970, it had earned $9,325,000 in rentals, thus the studio took a loss on the film.

=== Critical response ===
The film opened to positive responses from both audiences and critics. They especially loved the performances of both James Earl Jones and Jane Alexander, who were both in the original stage play and won Tony Awards for their work. Jones would get bigger roles after this film, and Alexander, who earned three more Oscar nominations in succeeding years, made her debut here. Jones later contributed commentary to a documentary about Jack Johnson that would sum up this film, saying: "To know the story of Jack Johnson is to know that it is a study in hubris."

Critic Vincent Canby referred to the film as "One of those liberal, well-meaning, fervently uncontroversial works that pretend to tackle contemporary problems by finding analogies at a safe remove in history". Critic Emanuel Levy wrote called it a "well-acted drama". Variety said: "Jones' re-creation of his stage role is an eye-riveting experience. The towering rages and unrestrained joys of which his character was capable are portrayed larger than life."

On the review aggregator website Rotten Tomatoes, 43% of seven critics' reviews are positive. Metacritic, which uses a weighted average, assigned the film a score of 53 out of 100, based on seven critics, indicating "mixed or average" reviews.

=== Awards and nominations ===
Award	Category	Nominee(s)	Result	Ref.
Academy Awards	Best Actor	James Earl Jones	Nominated	
Academy Awards	Best Actress	Jane Alexander	Nominated	
American Cinema Editors Awards	Best Edited Feature Film	William Reynolds	Nominated	
Golden Globe Awards	Best Actor in a Motion Picture – Drama	James Earl Jones	Nominated	
Golden Globe Awards	Most Promising Newcomer – Male	James Earl Jones	Won	
Golden Globe Awards	Most Promising Newcomer – Female	Jane Alexander	Nominated	
Kinema Junpo Awards	Best Foreign Language Film	Martin Ritt	10th Place	
Laurel Awards	Star of Tomorrow – Female	Jane Alexander	8th Place	
NAACP Image Awards	Outstanding Supporting Actress in a Motion Picture	Beah Richards	Won	
Writers Guild of America Awards	Best Drama – Adapted from Another Medium	Howard Sackler	Nominated	

== See also ==
- List of American films of 1970
- List of boxing films
