= Jane Johnson (18th-century writer) =

18th-century educational writer

Jane Johnson (née Russell, 16 December 1706–9 February 1759) was an English vicar’s wife who wrote letters, poetry, children’s fiction and teaching aids. Although none of her work was published during her life, it has since been studied as part of the history of education, children’s fiction, and epistolary literacy.

== Life ==
Jane was born 16 December 1706 to Richard Russell and Lucy Rainsford. On 16 December 1735 she married Woolsey Johnson, vicar of Olney, Buckinghamshire. They had four children: Barbara (1738–1825), George William (1740–1814), Robert Augustus (1745–99), and Charles Woolsey (1748–1828). Barbara collected textiles and her fashion album, published posthumously in 1987, is now held at the V&A Museum.

Olney was a centre of dissent, which Woolsey and Jane opposed. In 1739, Woolsey refused to let George Whitefield preach in his church. Woolsey built their house, Witham Hall, in 1752. He resigned his living in 1753 and died soon afterwards. Jane moved out of Witham Hall in 1756. She died on 9 February 1759.

== Writing ==
Between 1737 and 1748 Jane produced a collection of materials to help her children learn to read, consisting of alphabet cards, mobiles, and flashcards with cut-out illustrations and short verses. The collection, consisting of 438 items, is now held at the Lilly Library, and represents an early, domestic insight into how mothers taught their children to read before the rise of commercially available children’s material.

In 1744, she wrote A Very Pretty Story to Tell Children When They Are about Five or Six Years of Age for her children George and Barbara. This story is currently held by the Bodleian library and was published as a facsimile in 2005. It shows an early influence of French fairy tales on English children’s stories and provides an insight into mothers’ private stories for their children at the same time as John Newberry’s A Little Pretty Pocket-Book, considered the first published children’s book, appeared.

Jane’s surviving letters include "religious essays" and a short fictional narrative called 'The History of Miss Clarissa of Buckinghamshire,' as well as letters to her sons at school adapted to suit children learning to read.

Her commonplace-book, containing poems and hymns, is held by the Bodleian Library at the University of Oxford.
