= John Sutcliff =

Particular Baptist minister

John Sutcliff was born in 1752 near Todmorden, West Yorkshire, and died in 1814. He was Minister at the Baptist Church in Olney, Buckinghamshire in England for 39 years until his death. Sutcliff was one of the three who issued the Prayer Call of 1784, to extend the reach of Christ's Kingdom into the world, which brought about a revival of the Baptist Church within England, and the formation in 1792 of the Baptist Missionary Society.

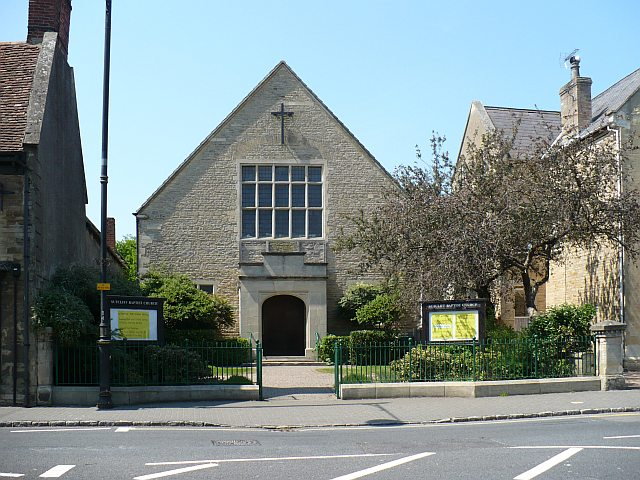
The church in Olney where Sutcliff was minister
