= Rosa Lee Ingram =

American sharecropper (1902–1980)

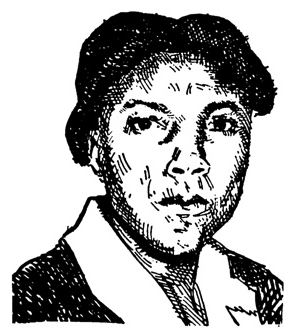
- Born: July 23, 1902
- Died: August 5, 1980 (aged 78)

Rosa Lee (Floyd) Ingram (July 23, 1902 – August 5, 1980) was an African-American sharecropper and widowed mother of 12 children in Georgia, after the death of her husband Jackson Ingram on August 5, 1947. She was at the center of one of the most explosive capital punishment cases in U.S. history. In the 1940s, she became an icon for the civil rights and social justice movement.

== Case ==
Ingram farmed adjoining lots with white sharecropper John Ed Stratford in Schley County, Georgia, near Ellaville. On November 4, 1947, Stratford confronted Ingram, accusing her of allowing her livestock to roam freely on his land. When Ingram reminded Stratford that both the livestock and the land were owned by their landlord, he struck her with a gun. Several of Ingram's sons came to her defense, and Stratford was killed by blows to the head.

Ingram, along with four of her sons, Charles (age 17), Wallace (age 16), Sammie Lee (age 14), and James (age 12), were initially arrested, although James was later released. Charles was tried separately and was released at the conclusion of his trial due to insufficient evidence. According to Charles H. Martin, this "...underscored the circumstantial nature of the evidence against his mother and brothers."

The trial of Rosa Lee, Wallace, and Sammie Lee, lasted just one day, held on January 26, 1948, in Ellaville, Georgia. They were each found guilty of murder and sentenced to death. National outcry against the verdict resulted in the sentences being commuted to life imprisonment. Despite the death sentence being withdrawn, public outrage against the harshness of the commuted sentences continued.

Although the prosecution claimed that the confrontation between Stratford and Ingram arose from a conflict over livestock, later reporting from the Pittsburgh Courier revealed that Stratford was enraged because Ingram had repeatedly objected to his sexual harassment of her. The defense argued that Ingrams' sons killed Stratford in self-defense.

The judge presiding over the case was Judge W. M. Harper. The attorney representing Ingram (and appointed to her the morning of the trial) was S. Hawkins Dykes. The jury for the trial was an all- white, all-male jury.

== Protest response to sentences and eventual 1959 parole, release ==
The sentencing of Ingram and two of her sons to die in the electric chair was handed down by an all-white, all male jury on February 7, 1948. When the defendants' executions were scheduled for February 27, 1948, less than three weeks later, the U.S. erupted in protests against the trial and sentences, which had been conducted in haste and secrecy. These protests were spearheaded by the Civil Rights Congress, Communist Party USA, and the NAACP. The Pittsburgh Courier's reporting on the facts of the attempted sexual assault were further amplified by The Chicago Defender and the Daily Worker further publicized important details of the case. Pressured to consider a new trial in March 1948, Judge Harper found that the convictions were based on circumstantial evidence and commuted the trio's sentences to life imprisonment in April 1948.

A second wave of protests ensued after the Georgia Supreme Court upheld the Ingrams' life sentences. In 1952, despite continued protests from civil rights organizations on the basis of the extenuating circumstances (e.g. that Stratford had sexually assaulted Ingram, and that her children were responding in self-defense), the Georgia pardon and parole board refused to free Ingram and her two sons. When Sojourners for Truth and Justice came to visit Georgia governor Herman Talmadge in January 1953 to plead for the Ingrams' release, they were turned away by the governor's wife, who told them the governor was out hunting. In 1955, the Ingrams were again denied parole. The State Board gave no reason for the denial.

After multiple subsequent requests were denied, on August 26, 1959, Ingram and her sons were paroled and released from prison.

Following Ingram's release, she lived in Atlanta, Georgia until her death.

== Civil rights impact of the case ==
The Ingrams were defended by the Civil Rights Congress, as well as Sojourners for Truth and Justice. As historian Erik S. McDuffie notes, the case galvanized Black feminists, highlighting the specific forms of oppression experienced by poor black women, as well as foregrounding the history of white men's sexual violence against black women. According to McDuffie, "Ingram's case represented in glaring terms the interlocking systems of oppression suffered by African American women: the painful memories of and the continued day-to-day sexual violence committed against Black women's bodies by white men, the lack of protection for and the disrespect of Black motherhood, the economic exploitation of black working-class women, and the disenfranchisement of Black women in the Jim Crow South." Black progressive women were the leaders of the global campaign to free the Ingrams.

== See also ==
- Womanism
