= Angie Dickerson =

American activist

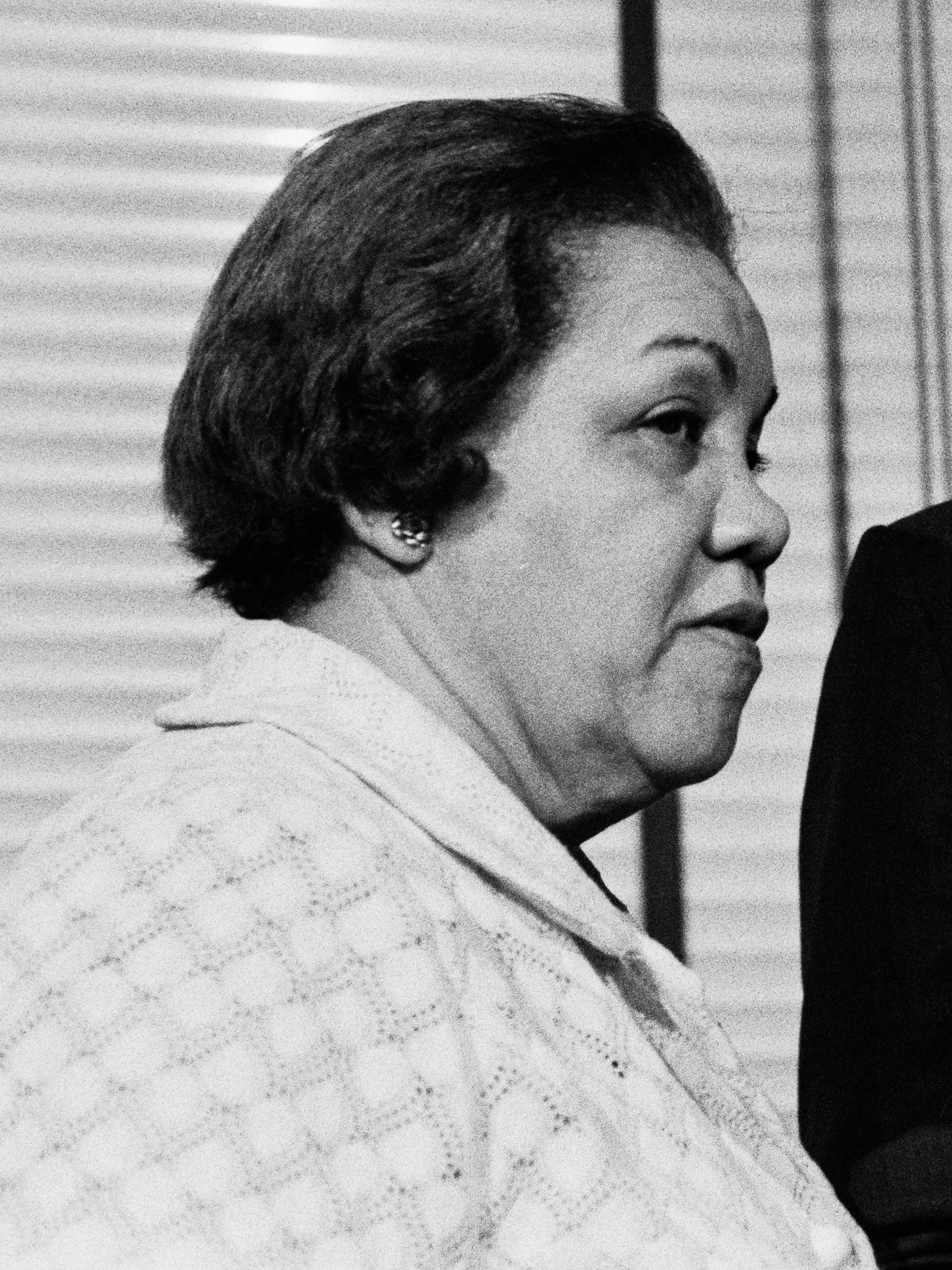
Dickerson in 1970

Angie Dickerson was a New York-based American tenants' rights organizer involved in the Communist Party who was under surveillance by the FBI. She was one of the members of Sojourners for Truth and Justice, a leftist, black feminist organization formed in 1951.

Dickerson was a member of the World Peace Council and advocated for US withdrawal from Vietnam and Korea. For the conference held in East Berlin of the World Peace Council from 21–23 June 1969 to convince the US to recognize the German Democratic Republic, Dickerson was sent 20 tickets for Aeroflot passage from New York City for conference attendees.

In 1970, Dickerson chaired, along with Ossie Davis, Dick Gregory and others, a National Emergency Conference to defend the Black Panther Party's right to existence. Believing that the US Attorney was attempting to destroy the party, a wide group of church leaders, civil rights groups, labor groups and colleges sponsored the conference. The sponsors included: Ralph Abernathy head of the Southern Christian Leadership Conference; Roy Innis, chairman of the Congress of Racial Equality; Irving Sarnoff of the Los Angeles Peace Action Council; and Rev. Quincy Cooper, of Black Methodists for Church Renewal.
