= Battle of Olney Bridge =

Part of the First English Civil War (1643)

Coordinates: 52.14938°N 0.70314°W

- Part of the First English Civil War
Date	4 November 1643
Location	Olney, Buckinghamshire
Result	Parliamentarian victory

Belligerents
Royalists	Parliamentarians

Commanders and leaders
Prince Rupert	

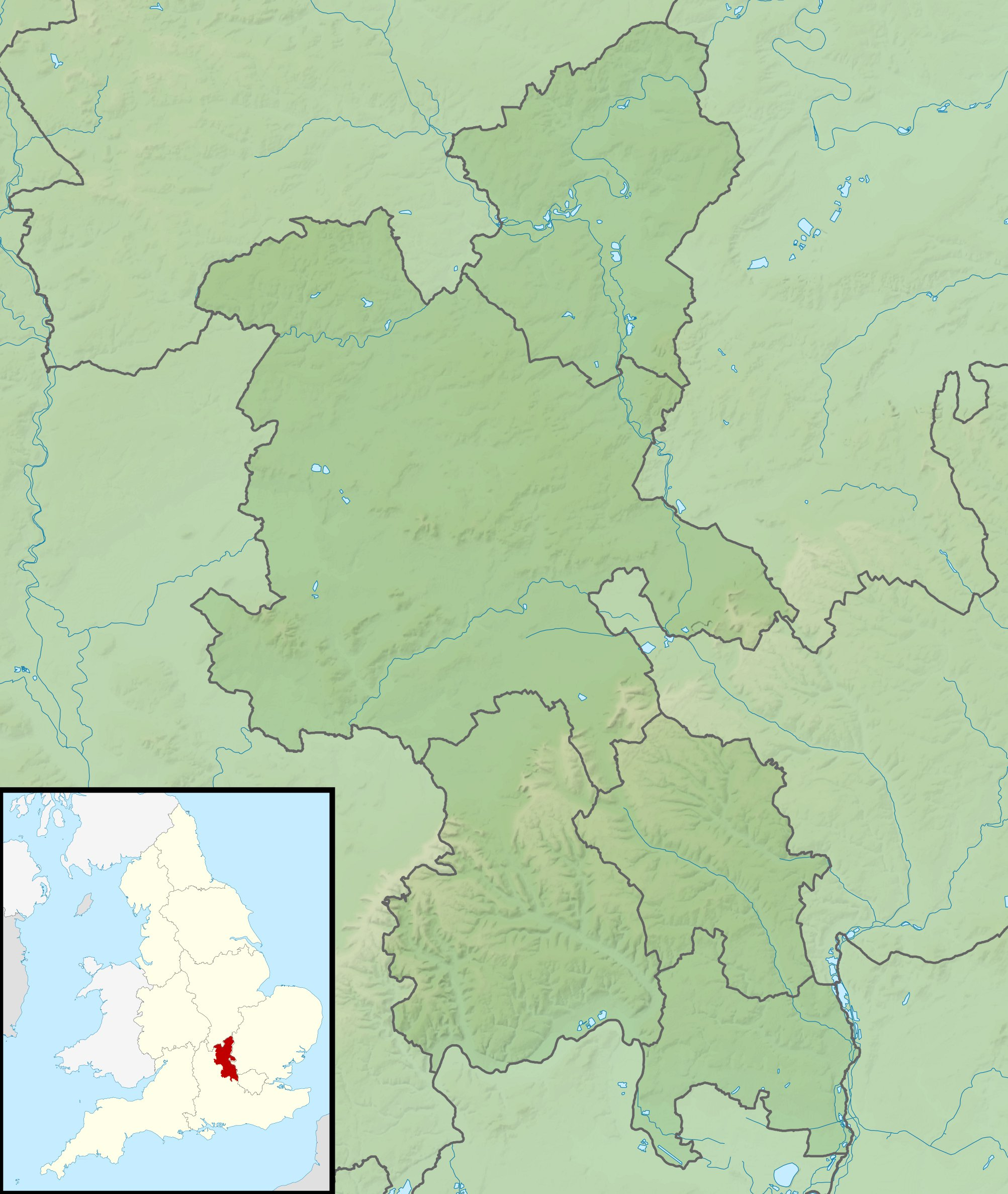
Buckinghamshire and Olney

The Battle of Olney Bridge was a skirmish that occurred on 4 November 1643 during the First English Civil War just outside the town of Olney, Buckinghamshire. In the engagement, Royalist forces attacked Parliamentarian forces holding the Olney bridge, but were driven off by a counter-attack.

== Legacy ==
The Olney bridge where the battle took place remains in place, along with a memorial to the dead.
