= Sojourners for Truth and Justice =

Sojourners for Truth and Justice was a radical civil rights organization led by African-American women from 1951 to 1952. It was led by activists such as Louise Thompson Patterson, Shirley Graham Du Bois, and Charlotta Bass.

Louise Thompson Patterson in Berlin, 1960

== Origins ==
In 1951, a group of 14 African-American women leaders issued "a call to Negro women to convene in Washington, D.C. for a Sojourn for Truth and Justice" to protest government attacks on sociologist W. E. B. Du Bois, who was also an historian, civil rights activist, Pan-Africanist, author and editor. In less than two weeks, more than 132 women from 14 states responded to the call.

- Louise Thompson Patterson was an American college professor and a social activist throughout the Harlem Renaissance.
- Shirley Graham Du Bois, was an American author, playwright, composer, and activist for African-American women.
- Charlotta Bass, was an American educator, newspaper publisher-editor, and civil rights activist.

The Sojourners for Truth and Justice held their inaugural meeting in Washington, D.C., from September 29 - October 1, 1951. They called on the government to address grievances affecting Black Americans. After President Truman declines to meet with them, members held a silent vigil on the White House lawn. The 1951 founding of the group was inspired by a 1950 poem written by Beah Richards, "A Black Woman Speaks of White Womanhood, of White Supremacy, of Peace."

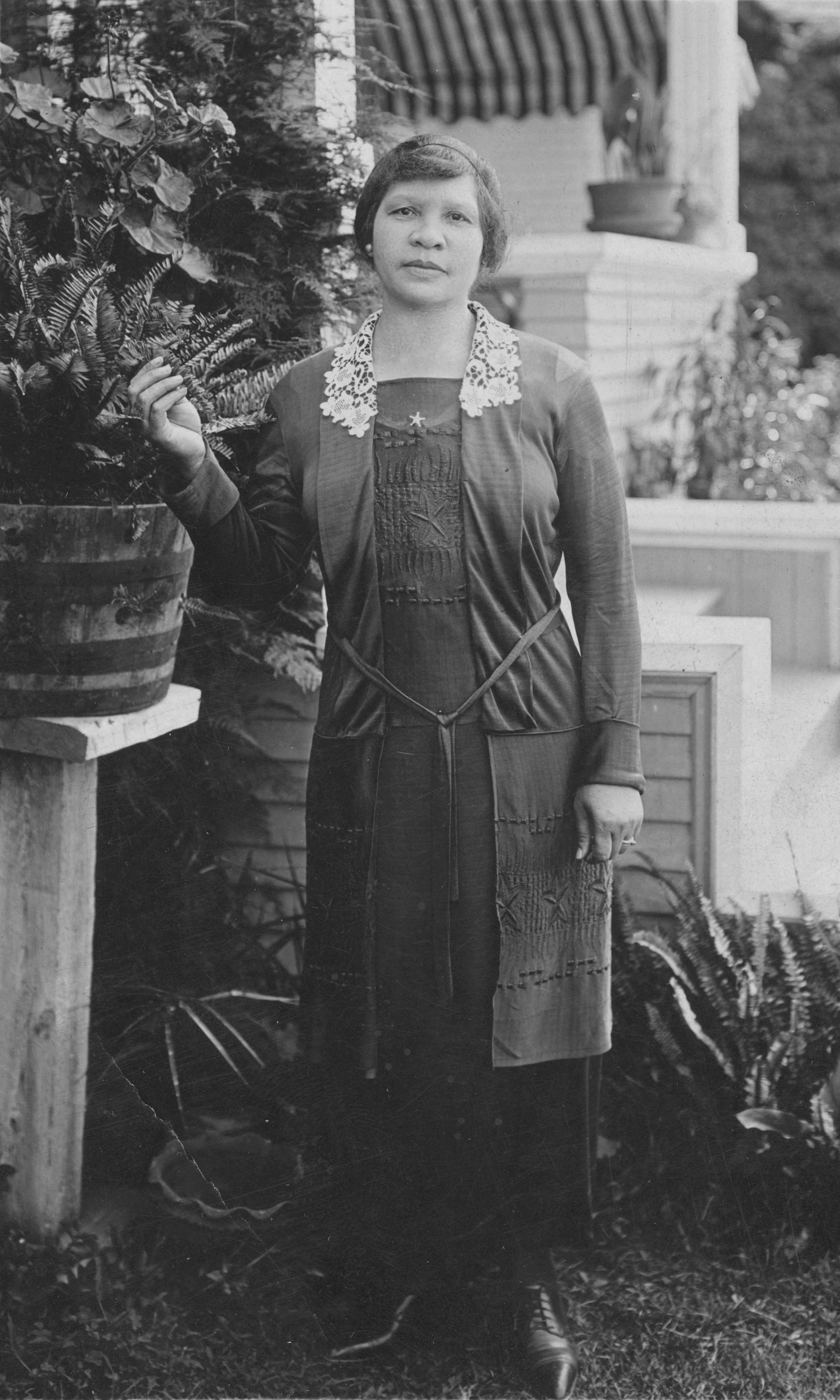
Portrait of Charlotta Bass, Providence. ca 1901-1910

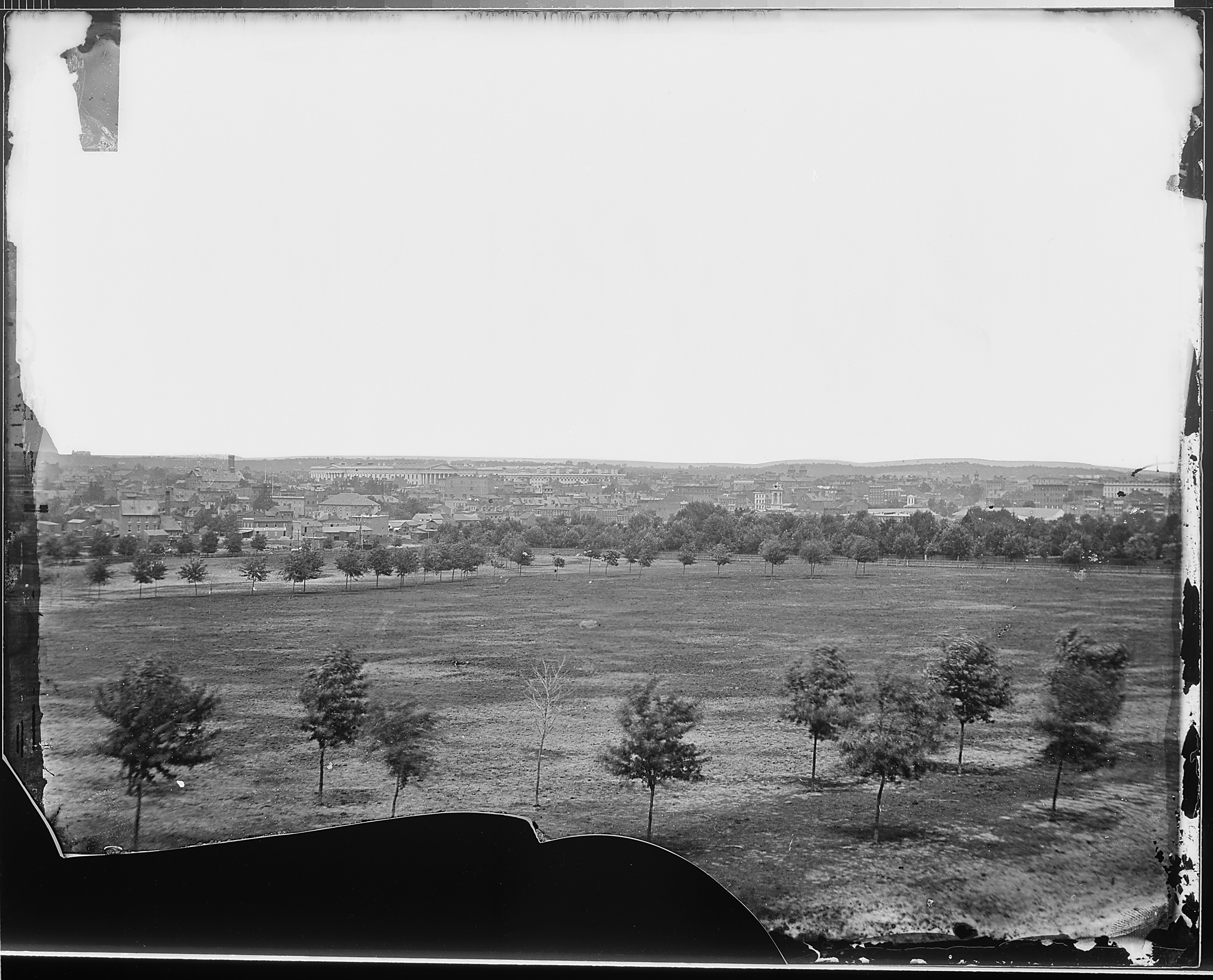
Washington, D.C.

== Trans-national activism ==
Invoking the tradition of radical black women like Sojourner Truth and Harriet Tubman, Sojourners for Truth and Justice mobilized "black women against Jim Crow and U.S. Cold War domestic and foreign policy". The only group on the Communist Left led by African-American women, Sojourners for Truth and Justice's members included newspaper editor Charlotta Bass, Angie Dickerson and Shirley Graham Du Bois, activist Dorothy Hunton, Louise Thompson Patterson, the young poet and actor Beulah Richardson, and writer Eslanda Goode Robeson.

== Domestic activism ==
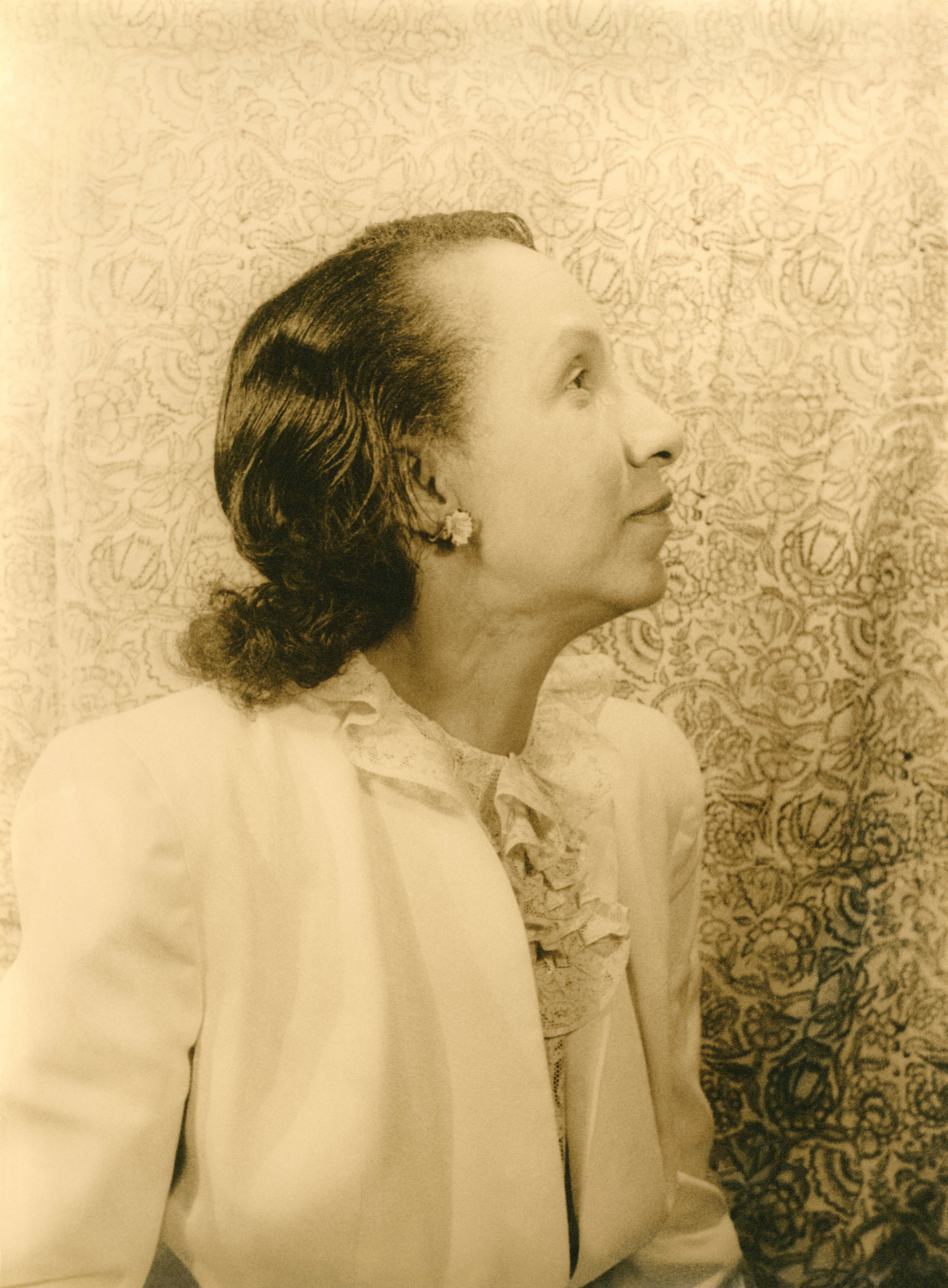
Shirley Graham Du Bois

In addition to their defense of prominent Black Left intellectuals and activists such as W. E. B. Du Bois and Claudia Jones, Sojourners for Truth and Justice organized to free Rosa Lee Ingram, the widowed mother of 12 who was sentenced to death, along with two of her teenage sons, after they killed a white man who had attempted to rape her. Her sons struck the assailant in the head with his own gun. The group also organized in support of W. Alphaeus Hunton, executive director of the Council on African Affairs (CAA) and editor of the CAA's publication, New Africa, who had been imprisoned for his affiliations with the Communist Left. and Paul Robeson whose passport had been confiscated by the Justice Department in 1950.

== Connections to USSR ==
Soviet Union coat of arms

Sojourners for Truth and Justice provides us with deep insight on the impact that black Communist women had on leftist leading movements throughout the early 1950s. "Erik S. McDuffie an Associate Professor in the Department of African American Studies at the University of Illinois at Urbana-Champaign (UIUC)", mentions how the Sojourners for Truth and Justice garnered political ties towards the Communist party in Russia.

== Legacy ==
Sojourners for Truth and Justice existed for a year and helped to articulate a Black Left Feminism that, in historian Erik S. McDuffie's words, "paid special attention to the intersectional, systemic nature of African-American women’s oppression and understood their struggle for dignity and freedom in global terms." In the repressive climate of the Cold War, Sojourners for Truth and Justice envisioned a political movement that understood race, gender, and class as being central to struggles for equality and justice, in biographer Carole Boyce Davies's words, "extending far beyond the narrow gendered formulations that appeared later in the mainstream feminist movement."
