= Barbara Johnson (fashion) =

English textile collector (1738–1825)

- Born: 1738; Olney, Buckinghamshire
- Died: 1825 (aged 86–87)
- Known for: Fashion album
- Parent(s): Woolsey Johnson; Jane Johnson

Barbara Johnson (1738–1825) was an English textile collector. She kept an album of fabric offcuts and fashion plates between 1746 and 1823, which has proved a valuable resource for fashion historians of the eighteenth century.

== Life ==
Barbara was born in 1738 in Olney, Buckinghamshire, the eldest of four children of Woolsey Johnson and his wife Jane, née Russell, and baptised in London. Her father was a vicar who opposed dissent in his parish and her mother a writer whose pedagogical materials and letters have proved useful for historians of epistolary literacy and informal education. Barbara had three younger brothers: George William (1740–1814), Robert Augustus (1745–1799), and Charles Woolsey (1748–1828). George took over the family estate; Robert married a sister of the 6th Earl of Craven; and Charles became a senior fellow of a college. In 1744, Jane wrote A Very Pretty Story to Tell Children When They Are about Five or Six Years of Age to entertain Barbara and George. In 1747, Barbara seems to have attended school in London, where her father had a second house.

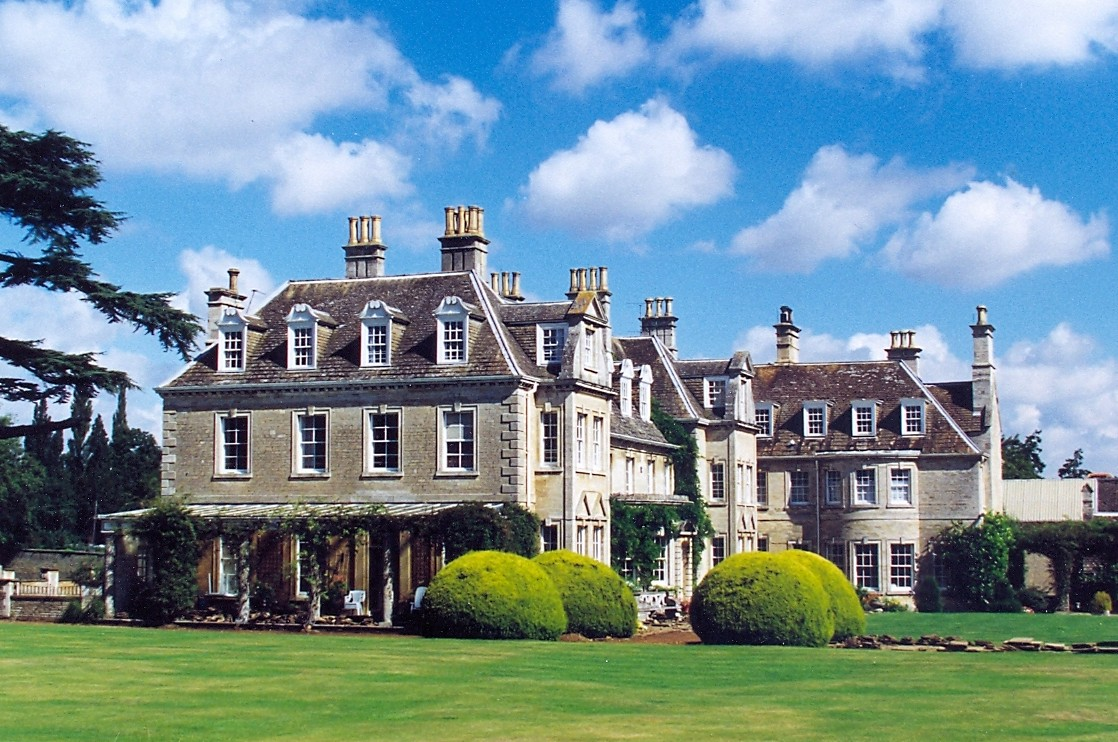
Witham Hall, the Johnson family home built for them in 1753

In 1753, the family moved to Lincolnshire to live in Witham Hall, which her father had built. He died in 1756, and her mother died suddenly of 'inflammation of the bowels' in 1759, a traumatic event for Barbara, who was left alone in the house with her friend Henrietta Ingram while her brothers were at school and university. The children came under the guardianship of a relative, the Revd Edmund Smyth.

Barbara seems to have lived with the Smyths for a time and then lived with George at the family home at Witham for some of the 1760s. She also spent much of her time staying with her friends Michael and Catherine Wodhull in London and Thenford. In the 1770s she was based in Northampton, making frequent visits to the Ingram family at Wolford, her brother Robert and his family at Kenilworth, and her aunt and uncle at Milton Bryant. By the 1790s, she had moved in with the Wodhulls and made yearly visits to Bath.

Barbara lived on the revenue from an estate left to her by her mother, which produced £60 a year, and bequests from her other relatives. Although she received an additional £50 per year after the death of her brother George, she said that she had managed to keep herself independent on her smaller income and 'met with as much real friendship, affection and esteem (the true blessings of life) as if I had possess'd a much larger fortune.'

Her letters to her brothers survive, and demonstrate her busy social life and her interest in music and politics as well as fashion. She also wrote poetry, for which she won a prize in 1776.

She died in 1825.

== Album ==
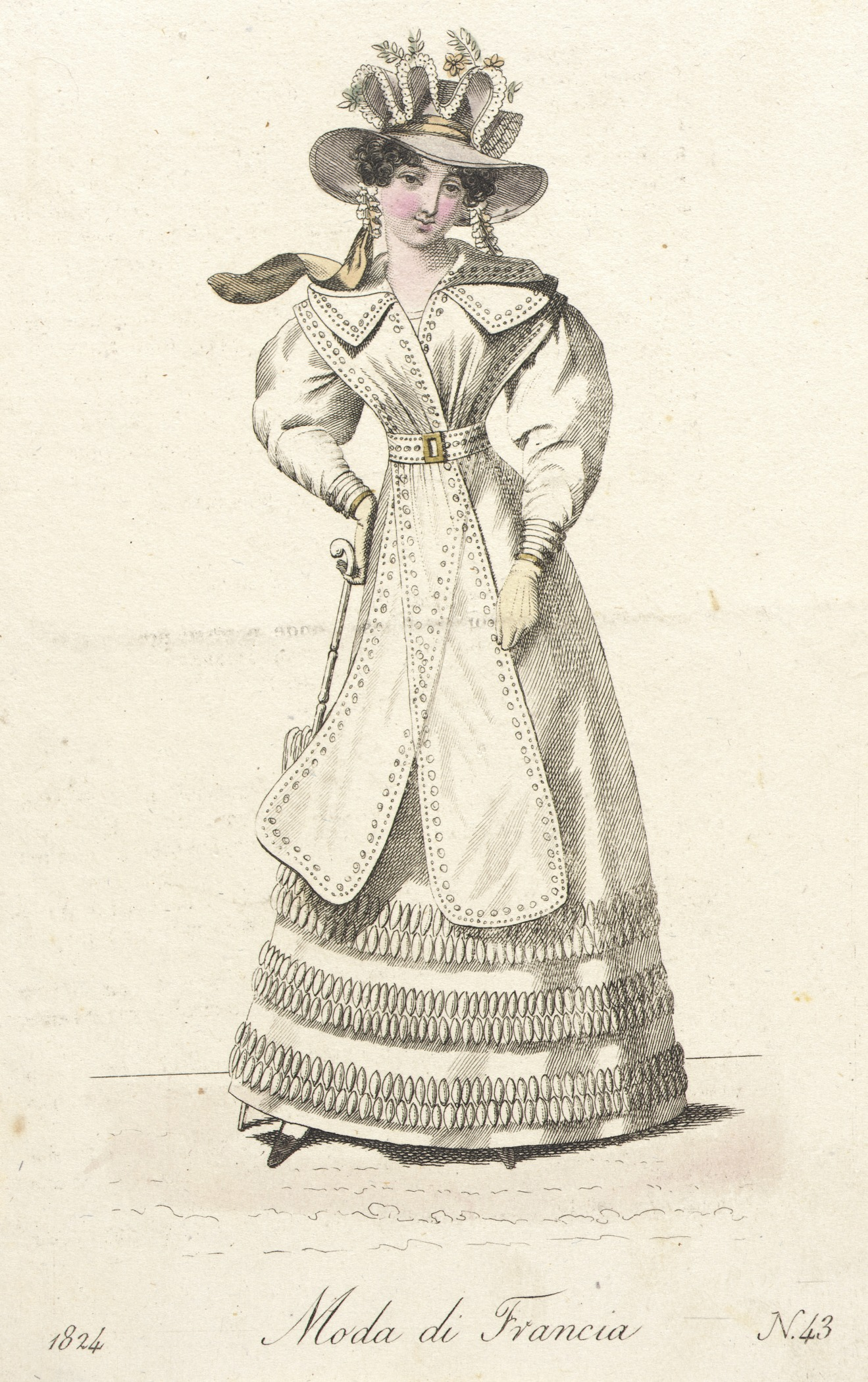
Barbara's album contains fashion plates from publications such as Carnan's Ladies' Complete Pocket-Book.

In 1746, at the age of eight, Barbara began collecting scraps of fabric from her new clothes in an account-book belonging to George Thomson. Thomson's account-book shows his expenditure in detail, but the connection between him and Barbara is not clear. The album contains over a hundred fabric samples as well as fashion plates, and was continued until Barbara was eighty-five.

The album was acquired by the V&A Museum in 1982. Studied alongside the Johnson family's letters, it has proved useful to fashion historians. A facsimile version was published in 1987.
