= Louise Thompson Patterson =

American activist (1901–1999)

Louise Alone Thompson Patterson
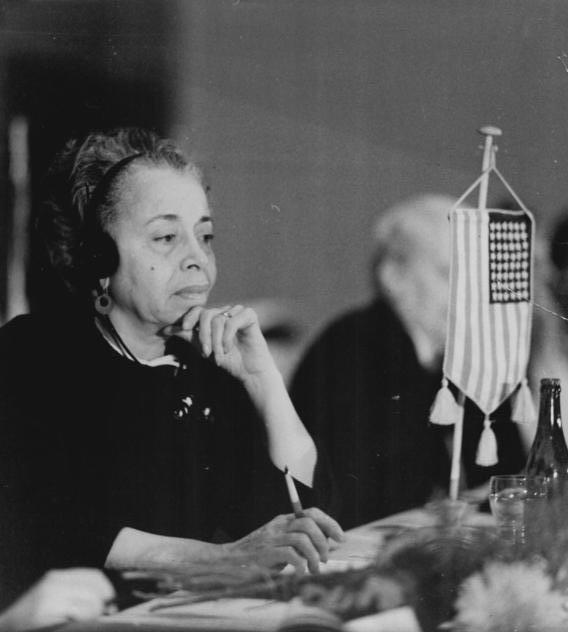
- Patterson 1960 in Berlin
- Born: Louise Alone Thompson; September 9, 1901; Chicago, Illinois, U.S.
- Died: August 27, 1999 (aged 97); New York City, U.S.
- Known for: Harlem Renaissance
- Spouse(s): Wallace Thurman; William L. Patterson

Louise Alone Thompson Patterson (September 9, 1901 – August 27, 1999) was a prominent American social activist and college professor. Patterson's early experiences of isolation and persecution on the West Coast had a profound impact on her later activism. She recognized the ways in which racism and discrimination affected individuals and communities and dedicated her life to challenging these systems of oppression. Her involvement in the Harlem Renaissance, a period of intellectual and cultural awakening in African American communities, allowed her to connect with other artists and activists who were similarly committed to social justice. In addition to her notable contributions to civil rights activism, Thompson Patterson was also recognized as one of the pioneering Black women to be admitted to the University of California at Berkeley.

== Overview ==
During the 1930s and 1940s, Patterson played a key role in the labor movement, advocating for workers' rights and organizing strikes. Alongside Paul Robeson, she fought for the rights of black workers and challenged the racism and discrimination within the labor movement itself. Her work paved the way for future generations of black union activists and leaders.

In the 1950s, Patterson became involved in proto-black-feminist activities, recognizing the intersectionality of race, gender, and class in the struggle for justice. She advocated for the rights of women, particularly black women, and worked to address the ways in which they were marginalized and oppressed within both the civil rights and feminist movements.

In the 1970s, Patterson was instrumental in the efforts to free political prisoners, particularly Angela Davis. She worked tirelessly to raise awareness of their plight and to challenge the unjust systems that had led to their incarceration. Her work on behalf of political prisoners demonstrated her commitment to justice and liberation for all.

Throughout the 1980s and 1990s, Patterson continued to work as a progressive activist and public intellectual, using her platform to advocate for a range of social justice causes. Her dedication to the struggle for justice and liberation serves as an inspiration to all those who continue to fight for a better world.

== Early years ==
Louise Thompson Patterson was born on September 9, 1901, in Chicago, Illinois. She grew up in Harlem, New York City, where her father was a Baptist minister and her mother was a schoolteacher. Patterson was one of six children, and her family was part of the black middle class. At the age of fifteen, she graduated from Oakland High School.

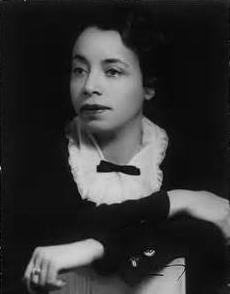
Young Louise Thompson Patterson

Right after her high school graduation, she was granted admission to UC Berkeley, which was open to all high school graduates who had completed the college curriculum and were recommended by their school. She resided with her mother near campus on Bancroft Way, where her social life was developed. Patterson pursued a major in economics and a minor in Spanish in the College of Commerce. In her senior year, she attended a lecture by the eminent Black intellectual W.E.B. DuBois on "The Economic Condition of the Negro in the United States," which left her inspired by his commanding presence and eloquence. Despite DuBois not being mentioned in her History of Education class and neither the Daily Cal nor the Berkeley Daily Gazette reporting on his campus address, Patterson was inspired to request a job on The Crisis, the most respected Black magazine of the time, in a letter to DuBois.

After graduating from UC Berkeley in 1923, Patterson went on to teach at Arkansas State College in Pine Bluff from 1925 to 1927. She later worked at Hampton Institute, a historically black college (HBCU), in Virginia, where she stood in solidarity with students who staged a protest against the oppressive policies of white administrators in October 1927. These policies included the customary singing of antebellum-era plantation songs to entertain white visitors on Sunday afternoons. However, her support for the students' actions resulted in her dismissal from the institute in 1928.

Following her dismissal, Patterson relocated to Harlem, New York, to join the thriving artistic community. Initially, she pursued a career in social work, but eventually emerged as a significant figure in the literary movement of the time, as she received a scholarship from the Urban League to attend The New School for Social Research, where she collaborated closely with prominent literary figures linked to the Harlem Renaissance such as Zora Neale Hurston, Alta and Aaron Douglas, and Langston Hughes. In 1929 and the early 1930s, she and her mother lived on Sugar Hill in West Harlem at The Garrison Apartments, 435 Convent Avenue, Apartment 22.

== Trans-national activism ==
Patterson became involved in left-wing politics and activism in the 1930s. She joined the Communist Party USA and worked as an organizer for the party. She also worked with the National Negro Congress and the Civil Rights Congress, advocating for civil rights, workers' rights, and other social justice issues. Patterson was a vocal critic of racism, imperialism, and capitalism, and she believed that socialism was the only way to achieve true equality and justice.

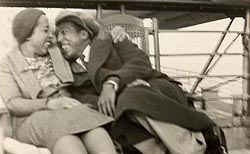
Louise Thompson and Langston Hughes aboard the SS Europa in June 1932.

Despite organizing various protests and establishing a notable Harlem salon, Thompson Patterson's most renowned affiliation was her close companionship with author Langston Hughes. Both of them were intrigued by the Soviet government system, and Thompson founded a Harlem chapter of the Friends of the Soviet Union in 1932. In 1932, after years of working with the International Labor Defense and the Civil Rights Congress on anti-Jim Crow and anti-slavery legislation, Thompson was introduced to communism for the first time. She was selected by the American Communist Party to organize a group of twenty-two writers, intellectuals, and artists from Harlem to create a film about discrimination in the US for a Soviet film company, to be called "Black and White". Many significant personalities from the Harlem Renaissance, including authors Dorothy West and Langston Hughes, were a part of this group. The intended purpose of the film project was to showcase the discrimination and oppression faced by African Americans in the United States and to promote the Communist party as a solution to these issues. However, the project ultimately failed to materialize due to lack of funding and pressures from US business officials to sever diplomatic ties with the Soviet Union, Thompson and Hughes established the Harlem Suitcase Theater, after returning to the United States, with the aim to combat racial stereotypes of African Americans in the arts. The theater presented plays written by Hughes and other Black writers and featured all-Black casts. In 1932, Thompson led a group of African American actors who traveled together to visit the Soviet Union. Despite the failed film project, Thompson's involvement with the Soviet Union and her support for the Communist Party USA earned her the nickname "Madame Moscow" from the U.S. media.

== Domestic activism ==
Upon completing her studies at UC Berkeley, Patterson became a teacher at Virginia's Hampton Institute. During her time there, she led a student uprising against the school's white administrators, who were imposing paternalistic policies. The African-American students at Hampton protested by singing old plantation songs to white visitors every Sunday afternoon, which resulted in Patterson's dismissal from the school. She then moved to New York City, where she quickly became involved in the Harlem Renaissance and social work with the help of a scholarship from the Urban Institute.

In addition to her activism in the Civil Rights Congress and the International Labor Defense, Patterson also organized protests against the conviction of the Scottsboro Boys, a group of nine young African American men who were falsely accused of raping a woman in Alabama. This case resulted in a highly publicized litigation that led to the sentencing of eight of the nine boys to death by execution. She was also instrumental in creating the Sojourners for Truth and Justice, a radical civil rights organization led by African-American women, such as Shirley Graham Du Bois and Charlotta Bass from 1951 to 1952. They viewed Black women as a vessel that would help bring about social change to a country that they believed was against women and African-Americans.

Thompson's political involvement extended to literary critiques as well. Her article "Toward a Brighter Dawn" focused on the exploitation of Black household workers in the Bronx slave market. Thompson highlighted how the intersection of race, gender, and class identities resulted in the triple exploitation of Black women, a term that had never before been explicitly used in print and marked a significant moment in the history of Black feminism.

== Marriage and family ==
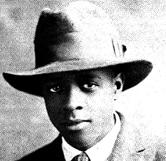
Wallace Thurman

She had a short marriage to the writer Wallace Thurman. Thompson married Thurman in August 1928 but their marriage broke up six months later when she reached the conclusion that he was homosexual. In 1940, Thompson married William L. Patterson, a notable Black communist lawyer. The couple worked together on many civil rights campaigns, including the Scottsboro Boys case, the campaign to desegregate the armed forces, and the fight against police brutality. They were both targeted by the FBI during the McCarthy era and faced persecution for their political beliefs. Unfortunately, William was eventually incarcerated because of these protests. Despite the challenges, the couple remained married for 40 years until William's passing in 1980. They had a daughter named Mary Louise.

== Later years ==
Thompson remained politically active throughout her life, including protesting the anti-Communist policies of Senator Joseph McCarthy in the 1950s. However, her influence in the Civil Rights Movement of the 1960s was overshadowed by other prominent figures. Patterson died of natural causes in New York City on August 27, 1999, just before her ninety-eighth birthday.

== Legacy ==
In 2012, Patterson was featured in California Magazine, a publication for UC Berkeley alumni, where she shared her experiences as an African-American during the "early West" and provided insight into the daily life and broader civil rights issues facing the United States, as well as highlighting similar issues in Russia. Patterson was among many black female social activists during her time who challenged the status quo and paved the way for future civil rights activists. Her contributions continue to inspire activists to this day.

Alongside Shirley Graham Du Bois and Charlotta Bass, Thompson played a key role in founding the radical civil rights group Sojourners for Truth and Justice in 1951.

Louise Thompson Patterson dedicated her life to teaching African Americans about communism and advocating for its potential to create equal footing in society. As a pioneering Black woman political activist, she fought against racism with her radical beliefs, paving the way for future activists in the civil rights movement.

== Bibliography ==
- Powell, Aisha D (2022). A Cultural Historical Analysis of Louise Thompson Patterson, Dorothy West and Constance White in 1932 Russia (Thesis). ProQuest 2722365343.
- Mack, Will (2 May 2021). "Louise Thompson Patterson (1901-1999)". BlackPast.org.
- Burden-Stelly, Charisse (12 May 2018). "Louise Thompson Patterson and Black Radical Politics". AAIHS.
