= Barbara Johnson Tucker =

American singer

Barbara Johnson Tucker was a Gospel recording artist from Conroe, Texas, US based in Houston, Texas.

== Biography ==
Tucker was born in Conroe, Texas on (June 28, 1944 - April 8, 2026) to Ernest James and Annie Eloise (Lawson) Johnson, both from Montgomery, Texas. As a child Tucker sang with her mom and siblings (sister Joy and brother Bud) as the Johnson Family at their home church in Houston, Jerusalem Baptist, and the Gulf Coast area. Many of the songs they sang were written by her mother Eloise. She is a member of Good Hope Missionary Baptist Church, where Rev. D.Z. Cofield is Pastor.

Tucker attended Houston schools including Jack Yates High School and Texas Southern University. For one semester, she served as a voice consultant in TSU's Fine Arts Department.

She was married to the late Kermit Tucker and they had one child, son Robert Christian Tucker, who gave them two grandchildren, Matthew Jonathan and Chelsea J'nai Tucker.

== Career ==
Tucker is a popular Houston based performer and producer. She was an anthem soloist at Houston Oilers football and Houston Rockets basketball games, and on local Christian TV.

In 1969, Tucker ventured to New York City for one year (leaving her job with the US Postal Service) and landed the only singing role in the 60-member cast of the play The Great White Hope which starred James Earl Jones. She led the cast in a "congregation song" over the escaping Jack Johnson. Also while in New York, she had her debut recital in the Carnegie Recital Hall and filmed several nationally shown commercials.

Tucker sang at the 1989 state funeral of Congressman Mickey Leland.

In 1992, after returning home, she retired from her manager position at Southwestern Bell Telephone Company. Her church then presented her in her first full-time ministry concert.

Tucker gained international fame as the first artist to record the extremely popular "Order My Steps" by Glenn Edward Burleigh. Tucker released an album that was awarded two Texas Gospel Music Awards in 1993: Best New Album and Song of the Year.

Tucker sang at the 1996 state funeral of United States House of Representatives member Barbara Jordan.

In September 2000, she was presented in concert at the Kennedy Center in Washington, D.C. by Texas Congresswoman Sheila Jackson Lee.

=== Albums ===
While working at the US Post Office in Downtown Houston, Tucker was a founding member of the Houston Post Office Chorale, which sang all over the state for 25 years. Tucker was featured on their two albums along with her sister, Joy.

Tucker manages and directs her background singers, A Chosen Few. They have performed for President Bill Clinton and throughout the South. In August 2002, they completed the 20-piece Christmas cantata "Born to Die" by Glenn Edward Burleigh.

In 2005, she released the DVD, A Glimpse of History, a 35-minute chronology of African-American music contributions.

In June 2015 (at age 71) she recorded a single, All That You Have Done, for Doranor Records.

Her earliest recordings were with her family. The Johnson Family has one LP, Sunshine After the Rain, in memory of her father, a 45 rpm recording of her mother's song, Dear God, I Thank You, which she reprised on her hit CD, Order My Steps, and a delightful Rap, written by her brother about his softball buddies called "The Right On Trot".
