= Jane Hall Johnson =

American engineer and architect

Jane C. Hall Johnson
- Born: October 11, 1919; Maryville, Missouri, US
- Died: 2001
- Education: Missouri University of Science and Technology; Harvard University
- Spouse: Benjamin Johnson

Jane C. Hall Johnson (October 11, 1919 - 2001) was an American engineer and architect. She designed numerous commercial, residential, and institutional developments.

== Early life and education ==
Jane Hall was born on October 11, 1919, in Maryville, Missouri. She was the second of three daughters born to her parents, both teachers. Shortly after her birth, the family moved to St. Louis, where she attended elementary and secondary school. In 1941, Hall graduated from Missouri University of Science and Technology (then known as the Missouri School of Mines) with a degree in civil engineering. In 1949, she decided to study architecture, and she graduated in 1955 from Harvard University with a Bachelor of Architecture. In 1970, the degree was converted to a Master of Architecture.

== Career ==
Hall began her career as a structural engineer, performing highway design and aircraft stress analysis for companies such as Nichols Engineering & Research in New York, Boeing in Wichita, Kansas, and Curtiss Wright in St. Louis. She worked as an architect in Boston for various firms between 1955 and 1959, specializing in developing and drawing construction plans. She worked with Manske & Dieckmann and the Missouri architects and urban planners Hammond, Charle & Burns between 1961 and 1963. Her work included developing perspectives, research and design proposals, and construction plans for office and recreational buildings.

Hall returned to St. Louis and married engineer Benjamin Johnson on October 11, 1969. The couple opened their firm together in 1970. They performed residential, commercial, and educational architecture and engineering work for the St. Louis Redevelopment Authority, the Human Development Corporation, and the City of Jefferson Department of Natural Resources, among others.

Between 1975 and 1984, there were more than twenty-five new projects and renovations carried out by Jane Hall Johnson and her husband, mainly public works: the municipal building for Wellston, Montgomery Hyde Park, the playground for the Center for Parents and Children in St. Louis, and the "Hyde Park Village" retirement villas in St. Louis. Hall also completed several residential expansion, remodeling, and new construction projects in St. Louis, photographing many of her projects. Hall's architecture is characterized by the use of volumes and simple lines, which highlight the brick or wood aesthetic typical of North American architecture of the 1980s.

=== Retirement ===
Jane Hall Johnson retired in 1997 and died in 2001. She maintained her professional licenses in Missouri and Illinois. She was also a member of the American Institute of Architects' St. Louis campus, and her architectural production is represented in the International Archive of Women in Architecture.
