= Shirley Graham Du Bois =

American-Ghanaian writer and activist (1896–1977)

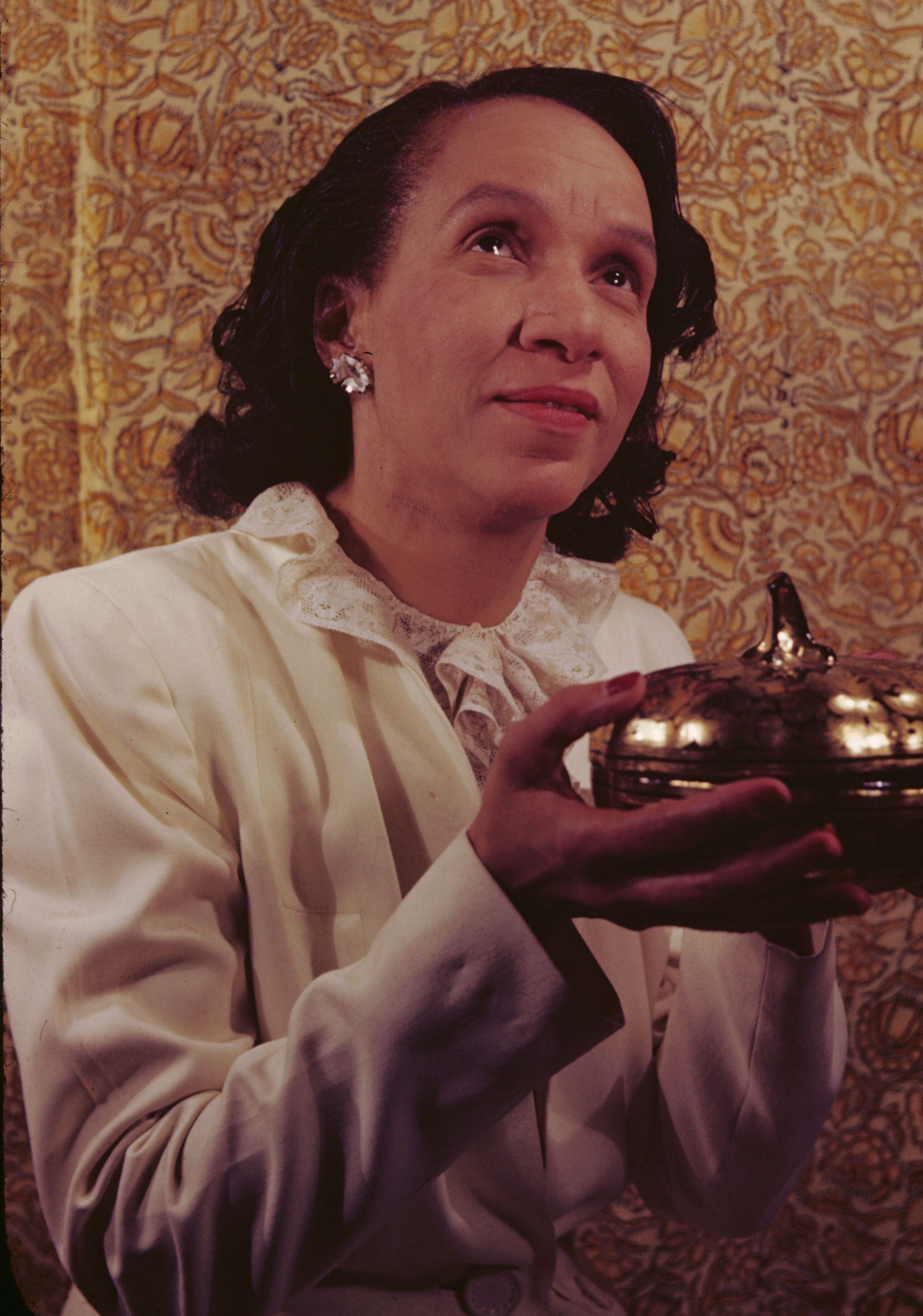
- Graham in 1946
- Born: Lola Shirley Graham Jr. November 11, 1896; Indianapolis, Indiana, U.S.
- Died: March 27, 1977 (aged 80); Beijing, China
- Resting place: W. E. B. Du Bois Memorial Centre for Pan African Culture; Accra, Ghana
- Citizenship: United States (until 1961); Ghana (from 1961); Tanzania (from 1966)
- Education: Howard University; Oberlin College
- Occupations: writer playwright composer activist television executive
- Spouse(s): Shadrach T. McCants (1921–1927; divorced); W.E.B. Du Bois (1951–1963; his death)
- Children: 2

Shirley Graham Du Bois (born Lola Shirley Graham Jr.; November 11, 1896 – March 27, 1977) was an American-Ghanaian writer, playwright, composer, and activist for African-American causes, among others. She won the Messner and the Anisfield-Wolf prizes for her works. She was also the second wife of activist W. E. B. Du Bois.

== Early life and education ==
Lola Shirley Graham Jr. was born on November 11, 1896, in Indianapolis, as the only daughter among five children. Her father was an African Methodist Episcopal minister and the family moved often due to her father's work in parsonages throughout the country. In June 1915, Shirley graduated from Lewis and Clark High School in Spokane, Washington.

She married her first husband, Shadrach T. McCants, in 1921. Their son Robert was born in 1923, followed by David Graham Du Bois in 1925. In 1926, Graham moved to Paris, France, to study music composition at the Sorbonne. It was there that she began composing the play Tom-Tom. She thought that the education in Paris might allow her to achieve better employment and be able to better support her children. Meeting Africans and Afro-Caribbean people in Paris introduced her to new music and cultures. Graham and McCants divorced in 1927.

Graham served as music librarian while attending Howard University as a nonmatriculated student under the tutelage of Professor Roy W. Tibbs. He recommended her for a teaching position at Morgan College which led to her position as head of the music department from 1929 to 1931.

In 1931, Graham entered Oberlin College as an advanced student and, after earning her BA in 1934, went on to do graduate work in music, completing a master's degree in 1935. In 1936, Hallie Flanagan appointed Graham director of the Chicago Negro Unit of the Federal Theater Project, part of President Franklin D. Roosevelt's Works Progress Administration. She wrote musical scores, directed, and did additional associated work.

== Career ==
She converted Tom-Tom into a full opera in 1932, and it premiered in Cleveland, Ohio, commissioned by the Stadium Opera Company. Tom Tom featured an all-Black cast and orchestra, structured in three acts; act one taking place in an Indigenous African tribe, act two portraying an American slave plantation, and the final act taking place in 1920s Harlem. The music features elements of blues and spirituals, as well as jazz with elements of opera. The score of this opera was considered lost and has not been performed since its premiere until it was rediscovered in 2001 at Harvard University.

Graham briefly worked at the Federal Theatre Project before it was shut down in 1939 by a group of anti-communists. Elizabeth Dilling – a White supremacist and staunch anti-communist – as well as Senator Robert Rice Reynolds, a Nazi sympathizer and antisemite, sought to defund the Federal Theatre Project. The Federal Theatre Project eventually was defunded as a result of this anti-communist and racist rhetoric. From 1940 to 1942, Graham worked at the Phillis Wheatley Young Women's Christian Association (YWCA) in Indianapolis, Indiana, where she focused on establishing a theatre program and then became the director of the YMCA-USO group in Fort Huachuca, Arizona. The YWCA supported the Federal Anti-Lynching Law. However, Elizabeth Dilling and anti-communist and White supremacist groups had claimed that YWCA was a "Communist-front organizations controlled by Jews" and attacked the organization's support for equal rights for Black peoples. Dilling's publication of "Red Channels" ultimately launched anti-communist backlash against Graham Du Bois, resulting in her work being pulled from libraries and censored.

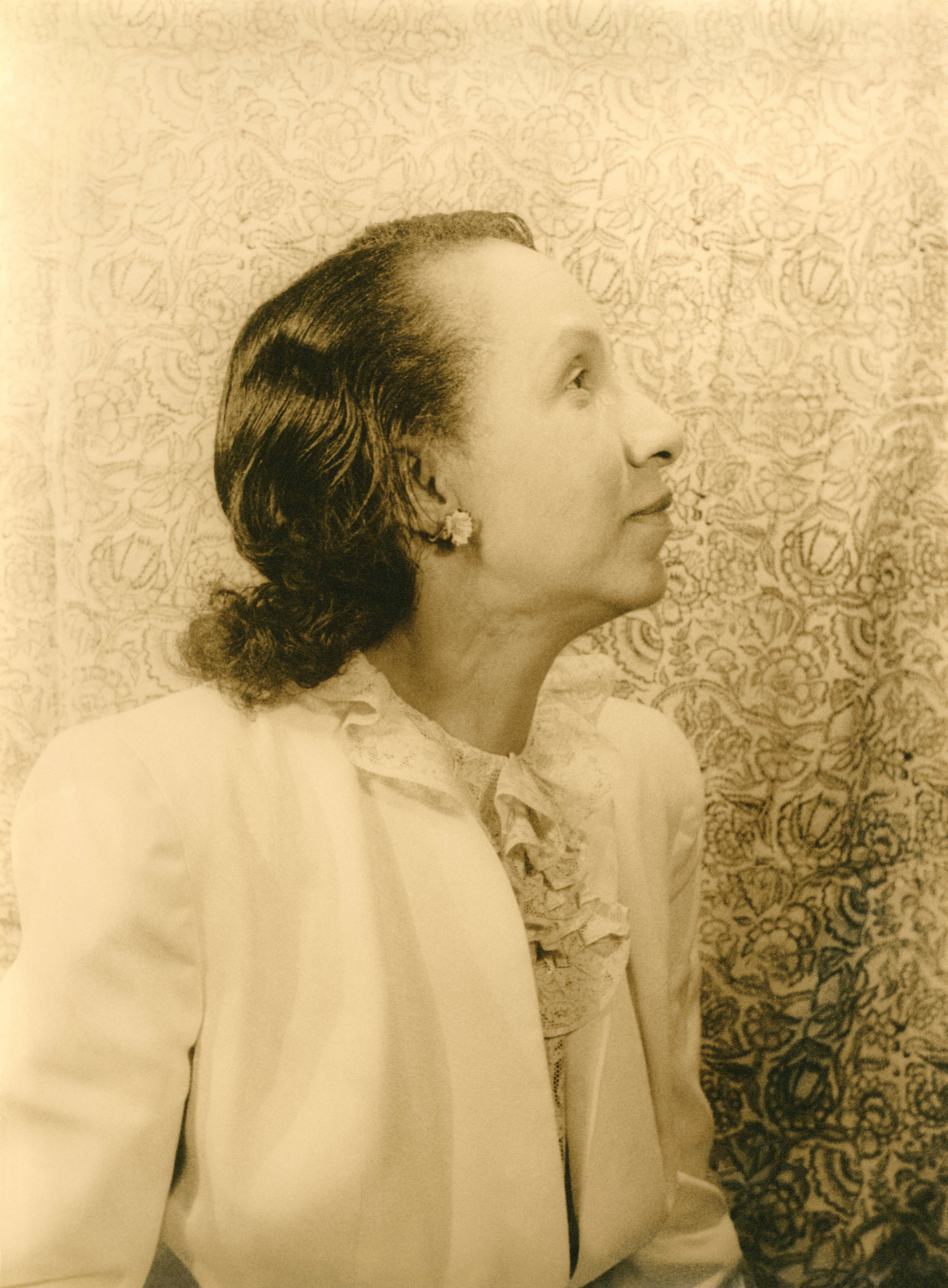
Graham in 1946

In the late 1940s, Graham became a member of Sojourners for Truth and Justice – an African-American organization working for global women's liberation. Around the same time, she joined the American Communist Party.

In 1951, she married W. E. B. Du Bois, the second marriage for both. She was 54 years old; he was 83.

After the United States Supreme Court ruled that the State Department could not deny passports to citizens who refused to sign affidavits that they were not communists, Graham Du Bois and Du Bois immediately applied for passports.

During her first visit to China in 1959, Graham Du Bois, alongside her husband W. E. B. Du Bois, was commemorated in China for their activism and commitment to Black liberation, as well as to liberation of all people of color across the globe. The Chinese Communist Party in 1959 commemorated W. E. B. Du Bois by publishing his book The Soul of Black Folk in Chinese languages. Graham Du Bois devoted her time in China to the women's struggle and sought to bridge ties between the proletarian struggle in China with the struggle of Black Americans. The People's Daily recognized her as a member of the World Peace Council and of the national committee for the Association of American-Soviet Friendship.

In part influenced by her experiences with Chinese state feminism, Graham Du Bois became increasingly political upon her return to the United States and became the editor of Freedomways magazine. She joined the Fair Play for Cuba Committee.

In 1958, Graham Du Bois and her husband visited Ghana, where she spoke at the All-African Peoples' Conference (AAPC), an event held by 62 African National Liberation organizations where she delivered a speech titled "The Future of All-Africa lies in Socialism" where she stated "Africa, ancient Africa, has been called by the world and has lifted up her hands! Africa has no choice between private capitalism and socialism. The whole world, including capitalist countries, is moving toward socialism, inevitably, inexorably. You can choose between blocs of military alliance, you can choose between groups of political union; you cannot choose between socialism and private capitalism because private capitalism is doomed." In 1960 the Du Boises attended a ceremony in the Republic of Ghana honoring Kwame Nkrumah as the first president of the newly liberated country. Graham Du Bois and W. E. B. Du Bois later became citizens of Ghana in 1961.

Graham Du Bois attended the Second Summit of the Organization of African Unity (OAU) in Cairo in 1964 and consulted with Malcolm X on the efforts of the Organization of Afro-American Unity (OAAU) to get support for the issues inside the US among heads of state, the UN and national liberation movements. Graham Du Bois announced the start of a course on television screenwriting in Accra to create a group of writers for Ghana Television.

Living in Ghana in 1961, Graham Du Bois and her husband renounced their U.S. citizenship. The United States Federal Bureau of Investigation "kept tabs" on their activities in Ghana.

Shortly after the death of her husband, Graham Du Bois became the director of Ghana Television on February 1, 1964, at the request of Kwame Nkrumah.

After Ghanaian president Kwame Nkrumah was overthrown on February 24, 1966, Graham Du Bois briefly moved from Ghana to Tanzania and became close to Tanzanian president, Julius Nyerere, and acquired Tanzanian citizenship. In 1967, she moved to Cairo, Egypt, where her surviving son, David, was working as a journalist. In Cairo, Graham Du Bois continued writing, studied Arabic and become a supporter of Afrocentrism.

In 1968, Graham Du Bois then moved to China in the midst of the Cultural Revolution. During this time, Graham Du Bois sided with the Chinese communists in the Sino-Soviet split. She had praised China's music programs in Shanghai and she joined the Bureau of Afro-Asian Writers. Graham Du Bois spent time in people's communes and with the Red Guards.

She gave talks at Yale and UCLA in 1970, where she was able to speak on imperialism, capitalism and colonialism and her experiences in countries undergoing socialist construction, such as China and Vietnam. She also gave W. E. B. Du Bois' writings to the University of Massachusetts, Amherst.

She produced a movie in China called Women of the New China in 1974.

== Death ==
Shirley Graham Du Bois died of breast cancer on March 27, 1977, aged 80, in Beijing, China, and was buried at the Babaoshan Revolutionary Cemetery. She died as a citizen of Ghana and Tanzania. Her funeral was attended by many important political figures in China, where she was honored as a hero for her internationalism and selflessness, including Cheng Yonggui, Deng Yingchao, and Hua Guofeng. The Communist Party Chairman laid a memorial wreath in honor of Graham Du Bois, as did the embassies of Tanzania, Ghana, and Zambia.

== Honors ==
Her alma mater Oberlin Conservatory of Music recently honored DuBois offering cluster courses and a conference devoted to reviving her remarkable legacy as a composer, activist and media figure. The conference was called Intersections: Recovering the Genius of Shirley Graham Du Bois 2020 Symposium on Thursday and Friday, February 27 and 28, 2020, that included a plenary lecture by Columbia professor and author Farah Jasmine Griffin. The event was co-sponsored by The Gertrude B. Lemle Teaching Center, StudiOC, a grant from the Andrew W. Mellon Foundation, Dean of The college, Dean of the Conservatory, History Department, Oberlin College Libraries, Africana Studies Department, and the Theater Department.

Her papers are archived at;

- W.E.B. Du Bois Manuscript Collection at the University of Massachusetts in Amherst, Massachusetts
- Federal Theatre Project collection at George Mason University in Fairfax, Virginia
- Washington Conservatory of Music Collection in the Moorland-Spingarn Research Library at Howard University in Washington, D.C.
- Schlesinger Library on the History of Women in America, Harvard Radcliffe Institute, Cambridge, Massachusetts

== Works ==
=== Tom Tom: An Epic of Music and the Negro ===
After meeting African people in Paris while studying at the Sorbonne in 1926, Graham composed the musical score and libretto of Tom Tom: An Epic of Music and the Negro (1932), an opera, within just three months. She used music, dance and the libretto to express the story of Africans' journey to the North American colonies, through slavery and to freedom. Each of the three acts depicts a specific transformation, articulated by at least sic characters.

Act I, set in 1619, portrays a highly exoticized depiction of tribal Africa, which was a standard occurrence in 20th century America. The score mostly consisted of percussion and West African melody approximations.

Act II, set in a mid-19th-century American plantation, depicts the characters as slaves struggling with conflicts of freedom, nationality, and religion. The score contains elements of African American spirituals and opera repertoire Graham was familiar with.

Act III, set around 1920–1930s Harlem, depicts a continued internal and external struggle. Referencing the Back-to-Africa Movement, Voodoo Man fails to convince other characters to return to Africa due to internal issues in African American communities and capitalistic greed. The score reflects this era with jazz, blues, cabaret, and even taxi horns.

The original program lists eight characters:

- Voodoo Man, played by Jules Bledsoe (Baritone)
- The Mother, played by Charlotte Murray (Mezzo-soprano or Contralto)
- The Boy, played by Luther King (Tenor)
- The Girl, played by Lillian Cowan (Soprano)
- The Mammy, played by Hazel Walker (Mezzo-soprano or Contralto)
- Leader, Preacher, and Captain, played by Augustus Grist (Bass, Baritone)

Stage Agent also names Real Estate Man (Bass) and Chairman (Tenor or Baritone).

Tom Tom premiered in Cleveland, Ohio. The opera attracted 10,000 people to its premiere at the Cleveland Stadium and 15,000 to the second performance.

In 2019, Lucy M. Caplan came across Graham's works and Tom Tom caught her eye. This led to a performance of selections of the opera. It has not been fully presented since its premiere for various reasons, possibly most notably being its size. Tom Tom features a 200-person chorus, a live elephant, and a waterfall on stage. Acts I and II seem completed, but Act III has two different versions in which researchers are unsure which Graham would have intended to be performed.

=== Further works ===
According to the Oxford Companion to African-American Literature, her theatre works included Deep Rivers (1939), a musical; It's Morning (1940), a one-act tragedy about a slave mother who contemplates infanticide; I Gotta Home (1940), a one-act drama; Track Thirteen (1940), a comedy for radio and her only published play; Elijah's Raven (1941), a three-act comedy; and Dust to Earth (1941), a three-act tragedy.

Graham used theater to tell the black woman's story and perspective, countering white versions of history. Despite her unsuccessful attempts to land a Broadway production as many African-American women before and after her, her plays were still produced by Karamu Theatre in Cleveland and other major Black companies. Her work was also seen in many colleges and both Track Thirteen (1940) and Tom-Tom were aired on the radio.

Due to the difficulty in getting musicals or plays produced and published, Graham turned to literature. She wrote in a variety of genres, specializing from the 1950s in biographies of leading African-American and world figures for young readers. She wanted to increase the number of books that dealt with notable African Americans in elementary school libraries. Owing to her personal knowledge of her subjects, her books on Paul Robeson and Kwame Nkrumah are considered especially interesting. Other subjects included Frederick Douglass, Phillis Wheatley, and Booker T. Washington; as well as Gamal Abdul Nasser, and Julius Nyerere. With the involvement of Liu Liangmo, state publishing houses in China translated and published her biographies of Robeson and George Washington Carver.

One of her last novels, Zulu Heart (1974), included sympathetic portrayals of whites in South Africa despite racial conflicts.

In 1974, Graham Du Bois produced Women of New China, a film that celebrated the 25th anniversary of the founding of the People's Republic of China.

Selections from her correspondence with her husband (both before and after their relationship began) appear in the three-volume 1976 collection edited by Herbert Aptheker (ed.), Correspondence of W.E.B. Du Bois. Shirley Graham Du Bois is the subject of Race Woman: The Lives of Shirley Graham Du Bois.

== Biographical works ==
Biographies for young readers:

- with George D. Lipscomb, Dr. George Washington Carver, Scientist, New York: Julian Messner, 1944, (Library binding has ISBN 978-0671325107)
- Paul Robeson, Citizen of the World, Connecticut, 1946: Greenwood Press, reprint 1972
- Your Most Humble Servant: Benjamin Banneker, New York: Julian Messner, 1949; winner of the Anisfield-Wolf Book Award in 1950
- The Story of Phillis Wheatley: Poetess of the Revolution, New York: Julian Messner, 1949
- The Story of Pocahontas, New York: Grosset & Dunlap, 1953
- Jean Baptiste Pointe duSable: Founder of Chicago (1953)
- Booker T. Washington: Educator of Head, Hand and Heart, New York: Julian Messner, 1955
- His Day Is Marching On: A Memoir of W.E.B. Du Bois, New York: Lippincott, 1971
- Julius K. Nyerere, Teacher of Africa, New York: Julian Messner, 1975
- Du Bois: A Pictorial Biography, Johnsons, 1978

Novels:

- There Once Was a Slave (1947), the Messner Prize-winning historical novel on the life of Frederick Douglass; and
- Zulu Heart, New York: Third Press, 1974

== Sources ==
- Azikiwe, Abayomi. "Pan-Africanism, Shirley Graham Du Bois and Nkrumah's Ghana". Pambazuka News, March 16, 2017.
- "Graham, Shirley". The Broadcast 41.
- D'Amato, Lilyanna. "The Legacy of Black Classical Music: Shirley Graham Du Bois". ClevelandClassical.com, July 8, 2020.
- Gao, Yunxiang. "W. E. B. AND SHIRLEY GRAHAM DU BOIS IN MAOIST CHINA1: Du Bois Review: Social Science Research on Race". Cambridge Core, Cambridge University Press, June 10, 2013.
- Harvard University. Du Bois, Shirley Graham, 1896–1977. Papers, 1865-1998 (inclusive), 1905-1975 (bulk). Work and Writings. Musical Scores. "Tom-Tom," Overture - Act III, folders 24f.1-24f.22. Schlesinger Library, Radcliffe Institute, Harvard University, Cambridge, Mass.
- Hine, Darlene Clark, ed. Black Women in America: An Historical Encyclopedia, New York: Carlson Publishing, 1993
- National Sawdust. BEFORE THERE WAS PORGY: LUCY M. CAPLAN ON SHIRLEY GRAHAM DU BOIS AND TOM-TOM. National Sawdust, 2022.
- Stearns, David Patrick. Shirley Graham Du Bois: Rediscovering a Lost Voice Through a Very Grand Opera. WQXR Editorial, 2020.
