= Olney, Buckinghamshire =

Market town in Buckinghamshire, England

Coordinates: 52.1529°N 0.7015°W

Olney
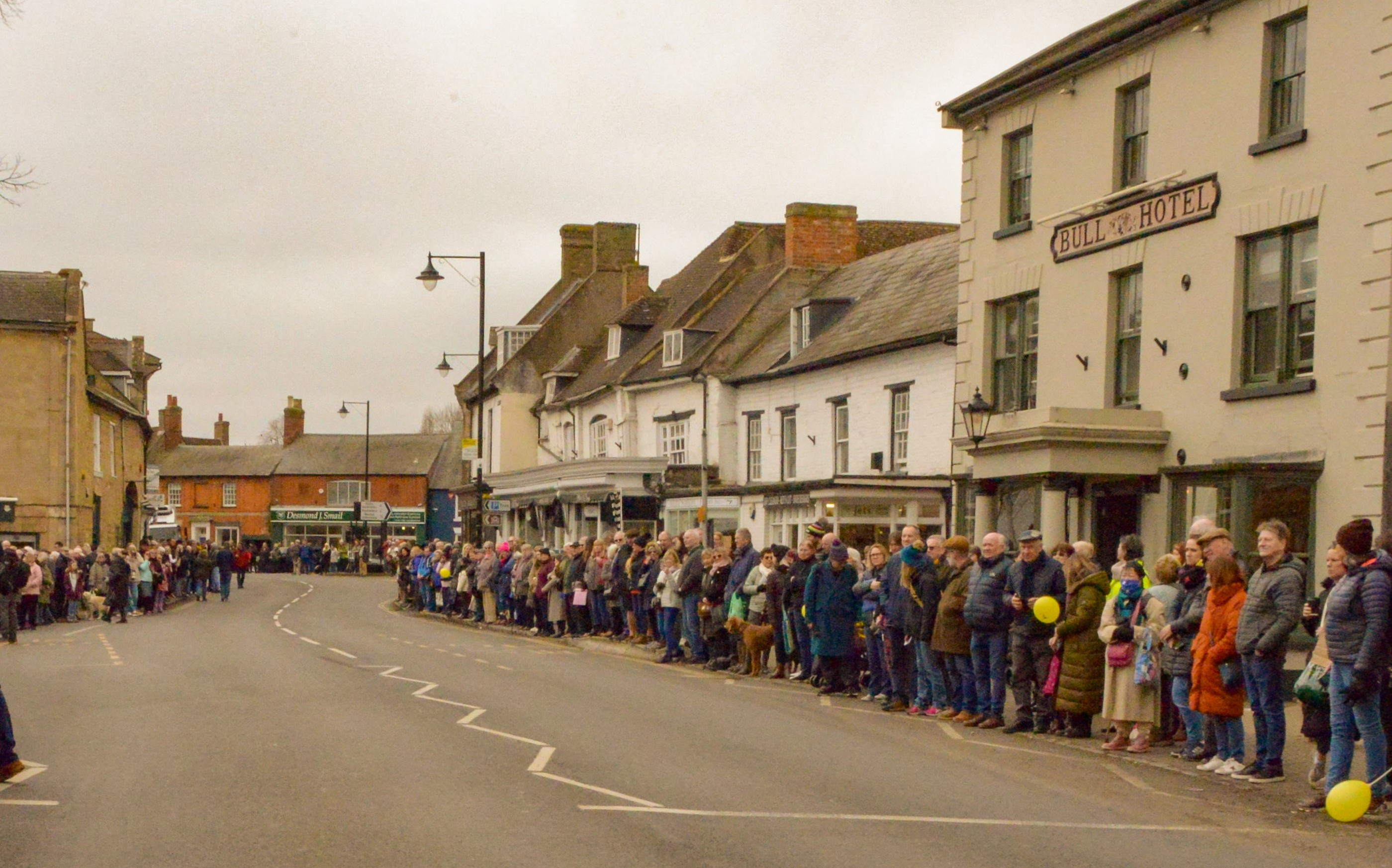
- Marketplace, Olney, Pancake Day.

- Location within Buckinghamshire
- Interactive map of Olney
- Population: 6,598 (2021 census)
- OS grid reference: SP889513
  - London: 50 miles (80 km)
- Civil parish: Olney
- District: City of Milton Keynes
- Unitary authority: Milton Keynes City Council
- Ceremonial county: Buckinghamshire
- Region: South East
- Country: England
- Sovereign state: United Kingdom
- Post town: Olney
- Postcode district: MK46
- Dialling code: 01234
- Police: Thames Valley
- Fire: Buckinghamshire
- Ambulance: South Central
- UK Parliament: Milton Keynes North

Olney (OW-nee /ˈoʊ.ni/ or OLL-nee /ˈɒl.ni/; the "L" is not pronounced by local people), is a market town and civil parish within the unitary authority of the City of Milton Keynes, England.

It is the northernmost parish within the historic county of Buckinghamshire. Lying on the left bank of the River Great Ouse, the town is (straight line distance) around 8 miles (13 km) from Milton Keynes, 10 miles (16 km) from Bedford, Northampton and Wellingborough, and just over 50 miles (80km) from London.

At the 2021 census, it had a population of 6,598.

Olney is best known for poet William Cowper, anti-slavery preacher John Newton, and their 1770's collaboration the Olney Hymns, including Amazing Grace; and also for its historic Pancake Race.

Many places in the USA and elsewhere, also called Olney, are named either directly after Olney in England, or a family whose surname originates from the Buckinghamshire town.

== History ==
Late Jurassic dinosaur bones were unearthed at a quarry in nearby Clifton Reynes. Evidence of Neolithic, Bronze and Iron Age activity has been found in and around Olney, much of it close to the River Ouse and to the later Roman town. The settlement likely developed near to a ford over the river; a mediaeval bridge was finally extended to fully span the flood-prone valley in the reign of Queen Anne.

Olney is considered to have been an important Romano-British township, with extensive stone, tiles, pottery, coins and a figurine of Mercury found in a now-protected field at the north end of the current town. A bronze ritual bowl of Roman-era Italian origin was discovered among Roman civic remains in 1977 at near-by Hyde Farm. In 2023, across the main road from the protected site, archaeologists uncovered a Roman villa with mosaic and bathhouse considered "of high significance".

In the year 932, the town is mentioned as Ollanege (Olla's island), and in 979 ten hides at Olney were granted by King Ethelred to his kinsman Elfere. According to the Domesday Book, the place later called Olnei was held in 1066 by Burgred, a descendent of the King of Mercia, but by 1086 its overlord was Geoffrey de Montbray, Bishop of Coutances.

In 1469, during the War of the Roses, King Edward IV was reportedly captured at Olney by Richard Neville, 16th Earl of Warwick. Local tradition has it that Edward used the church spire as a lookout.

In 1643, during the English Civil War, the Battle of Olney Bridge saw Prince Rupert's force attack Col. Harvey's Newport Pagnell-based Parliamentarians, with 60 killed.

The ownership of Olney had passed frequently between many aristocratic families and the Crown since 1066, but in 1755 Olney came to the second Earl of Dartmouth. In 1767 an Act of Parliament decreed the enclosure of the common lands of Olney. The Lordship of the town remained with the Earls of Dartmouth and their descendents until 1998. The current Lord of Olney is Dr Nicholas P George.

In the late 18th century, the poet William Cowper, and anti-slavery campaigner and Anglican cleric John Newton, collaborated in the town on what became known as the Olney Hymns, which include Amazing Grace. Olney has the Cowper and Newton Museum dedicated to them, adapted from Cowper's former residence, and given to the town in 1905 by the publisher William Hill Collingridge (born in the house). Newton was succeeded as curate in Olney by the biblical commentator Thomas Scott (1747–1821). In July 2022, the museum celebrated the 250th anniversary of Amazing Grace with exhibitions and special events.

Another influential Olney figure in Christianity was John Sutcliff, Baptist minister in the town for 39 years, who in 1784 led the call which culminated in the international Baptist mission.

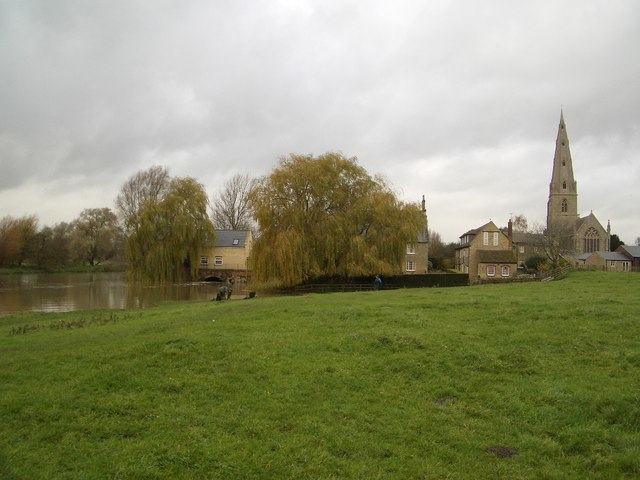
site of former Olney Mill

A Saxon-era watermill at Olney is first recorded in the Domesday book, where for centuries wheat was ground and eels were caught for the manor. In 1878 Olney Mill burnt down, but from 1894 the Gudgin family developed the Cowper Roller Mills there, until a final disastrous fire in 1964.

Olney was a centre of the Buckinghamshire lace-making industry, noted in 1769 for 'considerable Manufacture of Bone-lace'. Armstrong's 1928 Lace Factory, now apartments, is prominent on the High Street, ornamented as "the Bucks Lace Industry".

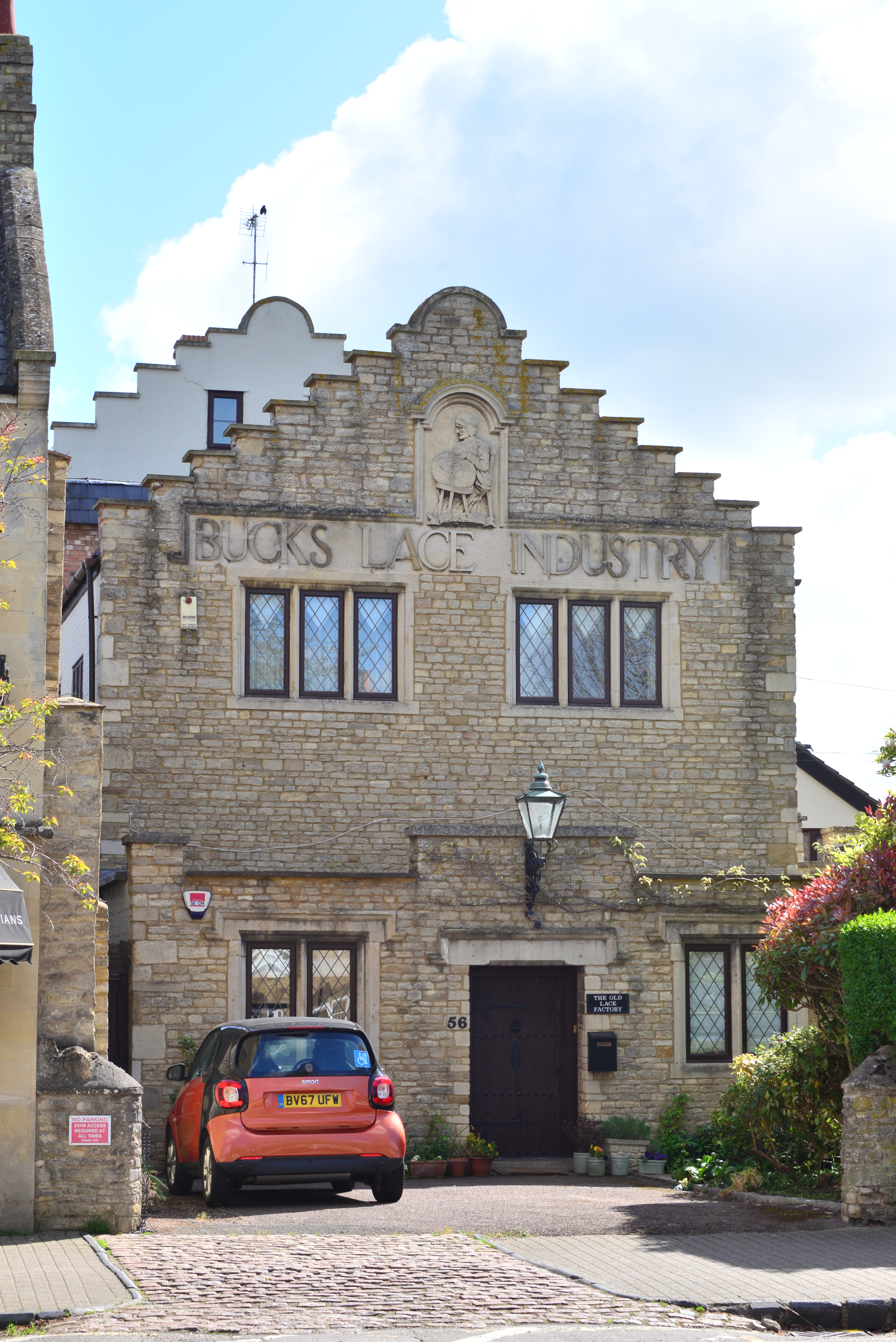
Armstrong's Lace Factory, Olney High Street

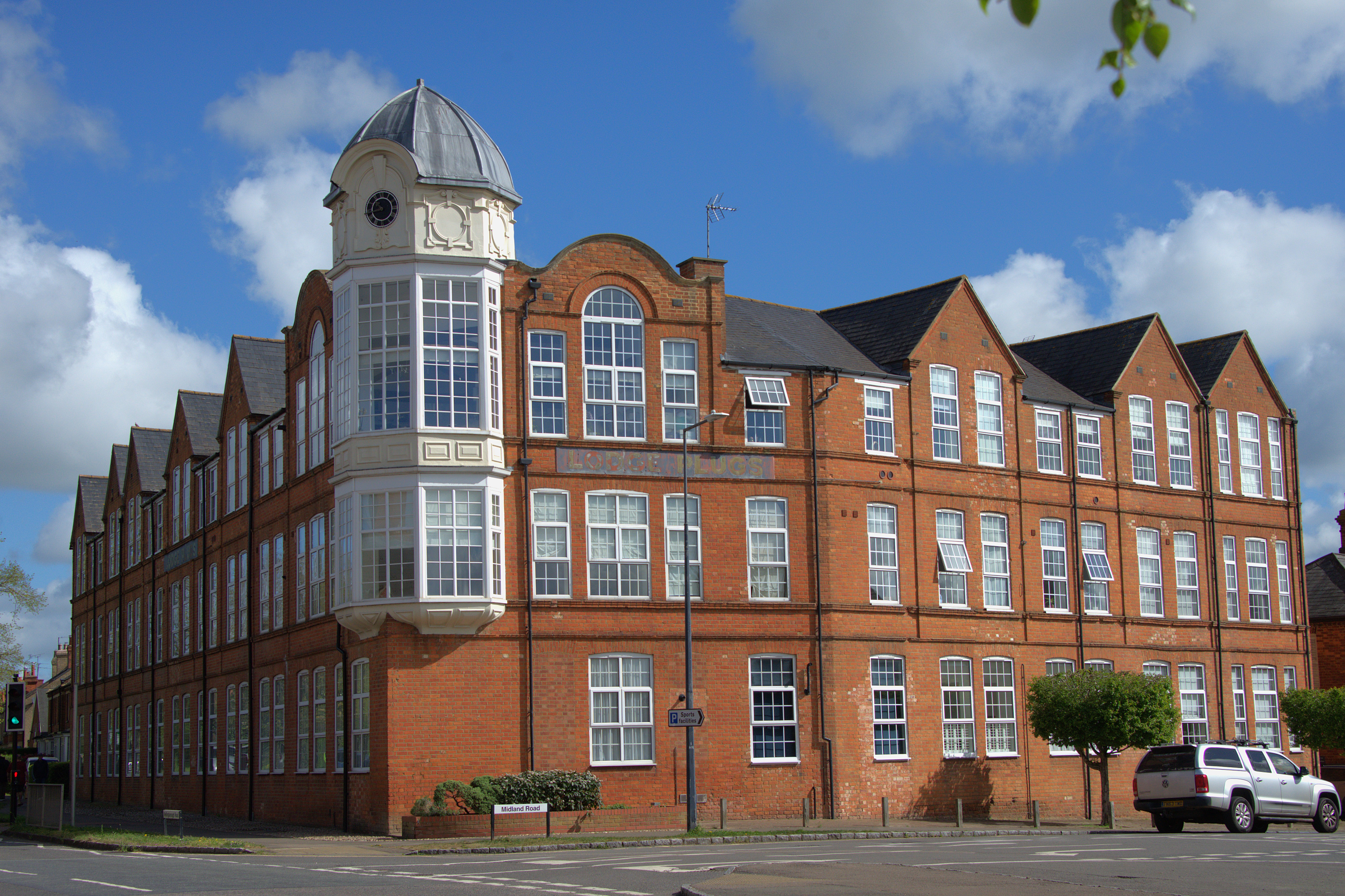
Cowper Works, Hinde & Mann's former shoe factory on corner of Midland Rd, now Kensington Place apartments

A tannery by the river in Olney dates from 1601 or before, into the 20th century. During the later 19th century shoe-making "became the staple industry of Olney", as a cottage industry gave way to small factories. In 1891 Hinde & Mann established the Cowper Works, which became the town's largest employer, producing 6000 pairs a week, before making military boots during World War 1, and later advertising as "the largest maker of gent's tan boots and shoes in the world". The building was subsequently used to make Lodge sparkplugs for World War II aircraft.

The 1841 census gave the population as 2,362.

=== Olney Park Farm ===
The hamlet of Olney Park Farm to the north of the town derives its name from a park established in 1374 by Ralph, Lord Basset. In 1861 it attained civil parish status, but was subsequently incorporated into an enlarged Olney civil parish around 1931.

=== Olney Pancake Race ===
Since 1445, a pancake race has been run in the town on many Pancake Tuesdays, the day before the beginning of Lent. Tradition records that on Shrove Tuesday 1445, the "Shriving Bell" signalled the start of the Shriving church service. On hearing the bell a local housewife, busy cooking pancakes for Lent, ran to the church, frying pan in hand, tossing the pancake to prevent it burning, still dressed in her kitchen apron and headscarf.

The women of Olney recreate this event every Shrove Tuesday by running from the market place to the Church of St Peter & St Paul, a distance of over 400 yards. The traditional prize was a kiss from the verger (now a trophy and cash prize). The competition was revived in 1948, and has run every year since 1950. Olney now competes with the town of Liberal, Kansas, USA, for the fastest time in either town to win the "International Pancake Race". There is also a race for local schoolchildren, a distance of about 20 yards.

=== Listed buildings, structures, historic landmarks and attractions ===
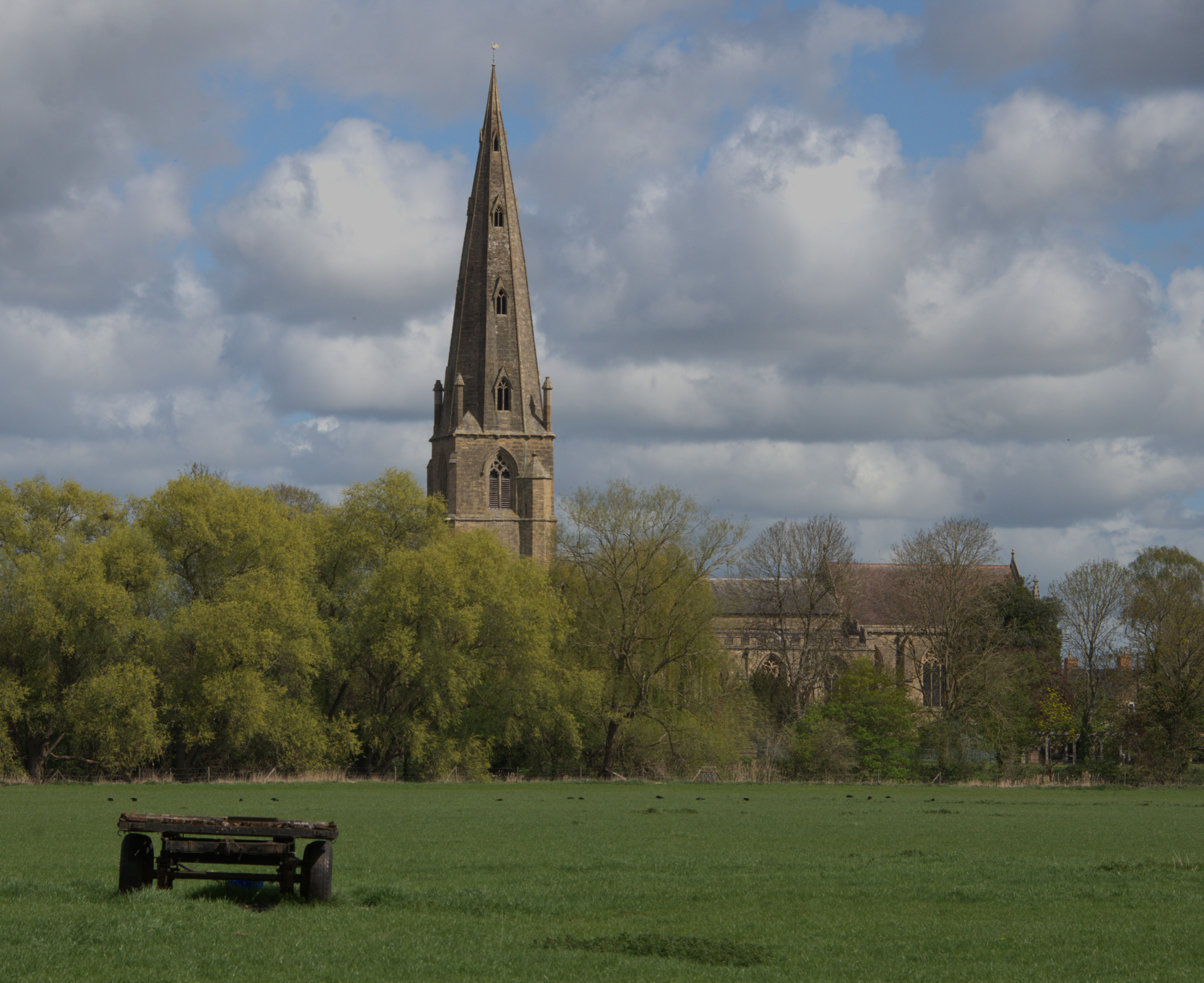
Church of Saints Peter and Paul, view from the South

The parish has one grade I listed building, the Church of Saints Peter and Paul; four Grade II*, and 114 listed at Grade II. The church is 14th century, with later additions. There are two scheduled monuments: a Romano-British settlement, on the northern outskirts of the town, and the 1830s bridge across the Great Ouse to Emberton.

As a former coaching town on the old Kettering to Newport Pagnell turnpike, with a brewery and growing workforce, the town has been known for its many historic inns. Several old pubs remain on the Marketplace and High Street. Together with regular outdoor markets, dating from 1205, the traditional retail, service and hospitality sectors around the High Street have evolved to attract numerous visitors for shopping, health and beauty care, and dining.

== Governance ==
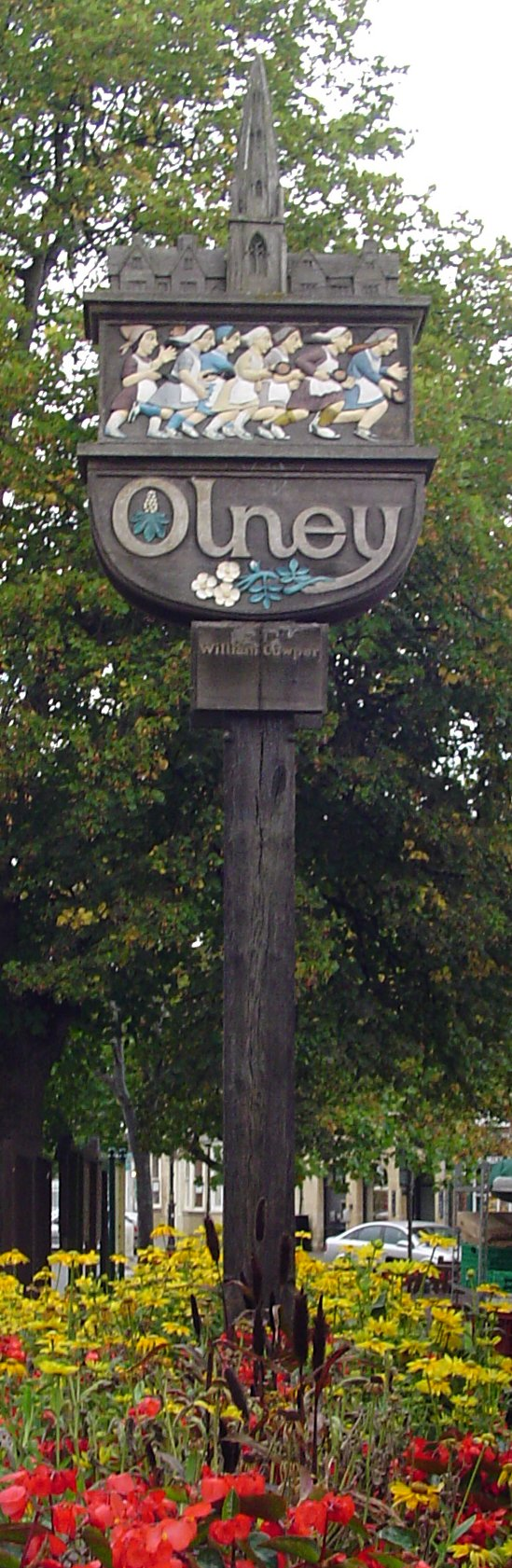
Olney town sign, depicting a women's pancake race

Olney has been part of the Borough (now City) of Milton Keynes since 1974, which has been a unitary authority since 1997. This gives Milton Keynes City Council the responsibility for the provision of most local government services. Voters registered in the town are represented on MK City Council, which has (since 2014) been divided into 19 wards each carrying 3 councillors, with Olney being part of the larger ward of the same name.

At the parish level, Olney has a town council based at the Olney Centre on the High Street.

== Demographics ==
Census population of Olney, Buckinghamshire parish
Census	Population	Female	Male	Households	Source
2001	6,032	3,067	2,965	2,454	
2011	6,477	3,352	3,125	2,715	
2021	6,598	3,409	3,189	2,865	

== Transport ==
The closest passenger rail service is at Wolverton (approximately 8 miles (13 km) distant), with inter-city services from Milton Keynes Central and Bedford railway stations (each approximately 11 miles (18 km) distant). Olney formerly had its own railway station on the Stratford-upon-Avon and Midland Junction Railway and the Bedford-Northampton line, but passenger services were withdrawn in 1962.

The town is bisected by the Milton Keynes-Kettering A509 road, which runs south towards the M1 motorway at Junction 14 (roughly 7 miles (11 km) distant), and north towards the A428 (which runs west towards Northampton and east towards Bedford and Cambridge).

Bus 21 (Red Rose) connects the town with Lavendon to the north-east, and Newport Pagnell and Central Milton Keynes to the south. Bus 41 (Grant Palmer) connects the town with Lavendon, Bedford and Northampton. The City Council also operates an on-demand bus service known as "MK Connect".

== Developments ==
Olney is identified by MK City Council (in local planning documents) as one of the three "key settlements" in the Milton Keynes UA outside of the 1967 "designated area" of the new town, with the town's complementary neighbourhood plan, adopted in May 2017, allocating a total of 300 homes for the town between then and 2031, with 30% of dwellings planned to be affordable.

== Media ==
Local news and television programmes are provided by BBC East and ITV Anglia. Local radio stations are BBC Three Counties Radio, Heart East and MKFM. The town is served by the local newspaper Milton Keynes Citizen.

== Sport ==
Olney has a Rugby Union team, Olney Rugby Football Club dating to 1877, whose past players include Blair Swannell, a legendary pre-1914 Northampton international who played for both England and Australia, Scotland & Saracens centre Duncan Taylor, and Edgar Mobbs, who captained the East Midlands and England, and formed a battalion of Sportsmen volunteers in World War I.

The town's football club, Olney Town, played in the United Counties League but closed in 2018.

== Notable natives and residents ==
- Thomas Armstrong (1898–1994), organist and college administrator
- Keith Barber (born 1947), former football goalkeeper for Luton Town F.C. (1970–1977), Swansea City (1977–1978) and Cardiff City F.C. (1978)
- Moses Browne (1703–1787), poet and clergyman
- William Cowper (1731–1800), poet and hymn writer
- Clem Curtis (1940–2017), musician, television personality, a member of the Foundations
- Ben Field (born 1990), convicted murderer
- Henry Gauntlett (1805–1876), organist and composer
- Barbara Johnson (1738–1825), textile collector
- Susannah Martin (1621–1692), executed for witchcraft during the Salem witch trials
- Edgar Mobbs DSO (1882–1917), rugby union international
- John Newton (1725–1807), clergyman, slave-trader-turned-abolitionist, and writer of "Amazing Grace".
- Thomas Scott (1747–1821), preacher and biblical commentator
- John Sutcliff (1752–1814), Baptist minister in the town for 39 years, and a key figure in the revival of the Baptist mission.
- Blair Swannell (1875–1915), rugby union international
- Dan Wheldon (1978–2011) (former resident), racing driver, winner of the 2005 IndyCar Series and twice winner of the Indianapolis 500.
- Albert William Wise (1886–1964), known as Micky Wise, born in Olney and played football as goalkeeper for Chelsea FC, Bedford Town and other clubs.
