= List of black Golden Globe Award winners and nominees =

Below is a list of Black nominees and winners of Golden Globe Awards in various award categories. Sidney Poitier was the first winner in 1964 for Lilies of the Field.

== Film ==
=== Best Performance by an Actor in a Motion Picture – Drama ===
Year	Nominee	Motion Picture	Result
1959	Sidney Poitier	The Defiant Ones (Academy Award nominee)	Nominated
1962	Sidney Poitier	A Raisin in the Sun	Nominated
1964	Sidney Poitier	Lilies of the Field (Academy Award winner)	Won
1966	Sidney Poitier	A Patch of Blue	Nominated
1968	Sidney Poitier	In the Heat of the Night	Nominated
1971	James Earl Jones	The Great White Hope (Academy Award nominee)	Nominated
1987	Dexter Gordon	Round Midnight (Academy Award nominee)	Nominated
1988	Denzel Washington	Cry Freedom (Academy Award nominee)	Nominated
1989	Forest Whitaker	Bird	Nominated
1993	Denzel Washington	Malcolm X (Academy Award nominee)	Nominated
1995	Morgan Freeman	The Shawshank Redemption (Academy Award nominee)	Nominated
1998	Djimon Hounsou	Amistad	Nominated
2000	Denzel Washington	The Hurricane (Academy Award nominee)	Won
2002	Denzel Washington	Training Day (Academy Award winner)	Nominated
2002	Will Smith	Ali (Academy Award nominee)	Nominated
2005	Don Cheadle	Hotel Rwanda (Academy Award nominee)	Nominated
2006	Terrence Howard	Hustle & Flow (Academy Award nominee)	Nominated
2007	Will Smith	The Pursuit of Happyness (Academy Award nominee)	Nominated
2007	Forest Whitaker	The Last King of Scotland (Academy Award winner)	Won
2008	Denzel Washington	American Gangster	Nominated
2010	Morgan Freeman	Invictus (Academy Award nominee)	Nominated
2013	Denzel Washington	Flight (Academy Award nominee)	Nominated
2014	Chiwetel Ejiofor	12 Years a Slave (Academy Award nominee)	Nominated
2014	Idris Elba	Mandela: Long Walk to Freedom	Nominated
2015	David Oyelowo	Selma	Nominated
2016	Will Smith	Concussion	Nominated
2017	Denzel Washington	Fences (Academy Award nominee)	Nominated
2018	Denzel Washington	Roman J. Israel, Esq. (Academy Award nominee)	Nominated
2019	John David Washington	BlacKkKlansman	Nominated
2021	Chadwick Boseman	Ma Rainey's Black Bottom (Academy Award nominee)	Won
2022	Mahershala Ali	Swan Song	Nominated
2022	Will Smith	King Richard (Academy Award winner)	Won
2022	Denzel Washington	The Tragedy of Macbeth (Academy Award nominee)	Nominated
2023	Jeremy Pope	The Inspection	Nominated
2024	Colman Domingo	Rustin (Academy Award nominee)	Nominated
2025	Colman Domingo	Sing Sing (Academy Award nominee)	Nominated
2026	Dwayne Johnson	The Smashing Machine	Nominated
2026	Michael B. Jordan	Sinners (Academy Award winner)	Nominated

Notes:

- Out of the 38 nominated performances, 25 of them earned Academy Award nominations or wins.
- Denzel Washington is the most nominated in this category with 9 nominations.
- Sidney Poitier, Denzel Washington, Forest Whitaker, Chadwick Boseman, and Will Smith have won in this category.

=== Best Performance by an Actress in a Motion Picture – Drama ===
Year	Nominee	Motion Picture	Result
1962	Claudia McNeil	A Raisin in the Sun	Nominated
1973	Diana Ross	Lady Sings the Blues (Academy Award nominee)	Nominated
1973	Cicely Tyson	Sounder (Academy Award nominee)	Nominated
1986	Whoopi Goldberg	The Color Purple (Academy Award nominee)	Won
2002	Halle Berry	Monster's Ball (Academy Award winner)	Nominated
2010	Gabourey Sidibe	Precious (Academy Award nominee)	Nominated
2011	Halle Berry	Frankie and Alice	Nominated
2012	Viola Davis	The Help (Academy Award nominee)	Nominated
2017	Ruth Negga	Loving (Academy Award nominee)	Nominated
2020	Cynthia Erivo	Harriet (Academy Award nominee)	Nominated
2021	Viola Davis	Ma Rainey's Black Bottom (Academy Award nominee)	Nominated
2021	Andra Day	The United States vs. Billie Holiday (Academy Award nominee)	Won
2023	Viola Davis	The Woman King	Nominated
2026	Tessa Thompson	Hedda	Nominated

Notes:

- Out of the 14 nominated performances, 10 of them earned Academy Award nominations or wins.
- Viola Davis is the most nominated in this category with 3 nominations.
- Whoopi Goldberg and Andra Day have won in this category.

=== Best Performance by an Actor in a Motion Picture – Musical or Comedy ===
Year	Nominee	Motion Picture	Result
1960	Sidney Poitier	Porgy and Bess	Nominated
1974	Carl Anderson	Jesus Christ Superstar	Nominated
1975	James Earl Jones	Claudine	Nominated
1984	Eddie Murphy	Trading Places	Nominated
1985	Eddie Murphy	Beverly Hills Cop	Nominated
1990	Morgan Freeman	Driving Miss Daisy (Academy Award nominee)	Won
1997	Eddie Murphy	The Nutty Professor	Nominated
1998	Samuel L. Jackson	Jackie Brown	Nominated
2005	Jamie Foxx	Ray (Academy Award winner)	Won
2007	Chiwetel Ejiofor	Kinky Boots	Nominated
2018	Daniel Kaluuya	Get Out (Academy Award nominee)	Nominated
2020	Eddie Murphy	Dolemite Is My Name	Nominated
2024	Jeffrey Wright	American Fiction (Academy Award nominee)	Nominated

Notes:

- Out of the 13 nominated performances, 4 of them earned Academy Award nominations or wins.
- Eddie Murphy is the most nominated in this category with 4 nominations.
- Morgan Freeman and Jamie Foxx have won in this category.

=== Best Performance by an Actress in a Motion Picture – Musical or Comedy ===
Year	Nominee	Motion Picture	Result
1960	Dorothy Dandridge	Porgy and Bess	Nominated
1975	Diahann Carroll	Claudine (Academy Award nominee)	Nominated
1981	Irene Cara	Fame	Nominated
1984	Jennifer Beals	Flashdance	Nominated
1993	Whoopi Goldberg	Sister Act	Nominated
1994	Angela Bassett	What's Love Got to Do With It (Academy Award nominee)	Won
1998	Pam Grier	Jackie Brown	Nominated
2007	Beyoncé	Dreamgirls	Nominated
2009	Rebecca Hall	Vicky Cristina Barcelona	Nominated
2015	Quvenzhané Wallis	Annie	Nominated
2024	Fantasia Barrino	The Color Purple	Nominated
2025	Cynthia Erivo	Wicked (Academy Award nominee)	Nominated
2025	Zendaya	Challengers	Nominated
2026	Cynthia Erivo	Wicked: For Good	Nominated
2026	Chase Infiniti	One Battle After Another	Nominated

Notes:

- Out of the 15 nominated performances, 3 of them earned Academy Award nominations.
- Cynthia Erivo is the most nominated in this category with 2 nominations.
- Currently, Angela Bassett is the only winner in this category.

=== Best Performance by an Actor in a Supporting Role in any Motion Picture ===
Year	Nominee	Motion Picture	Result
1969	Ossie Davis	The Scalphunters	Nominated
1982	Howard E. Rollins Jr.	Ragtime (Academy Award nominee)	Nominated
1983	Louis Gossett Jr.	An Officer and a Gentleman (Academy Award winner)	Won
1985	Adolph Caesar	A Soldier's Story (Academy Award nominee)	Nominated
1988	Morgan Freeman	Street Smart (Academy Award nominee)	Nominated
1990	Denzel Washington	Glory (Academy Award winner)	Won
1995	Samuel L. Jackson	Pulp Fiction (Academy Award nominee)	Nominated
1997	Cuba Gooding Jr.	Jerry Maguire (Academy Award winner)	Nominated
1997	Samuel L. Jackson	A Time to Kill	Nominated
2000	Michael Clarke Duncan	The Green Mile (Academy Award nominee)	Nominated
2005	Jamie Foxx	Collateral (Academy Award nominee)	Nominated
2005	Morgan Freeman	Million Dollar Baby (Academy Award winner)	Nominated
2007	Eddie Murphy	Dreamgirls (Academy Award nominee)	Won
2014	Barkhad Abdi	Captain Phillips (Academy Award nominee)	Nominated
2016	Idris Elba	Beasts of No Nation	Nominated
2017	Mahershala Ali	Moonlight (Academy Award winner)	Nominated
2019	Mahershala Ali	Green Book (Academy Award winner)	Won
2021	Daniel Kaluuya	Judas and the Black Messiah (Academy Award winner)	Won
2021	Leslie Odom Jr.	One Night in Miami... (Academy Award nominee)	Nominated
2025	Denzel Washington	Gladiator II	Nominated

Notes:

- Out of the 20 nominated performances, 16 went on to earn Academy Award nominations or wins.
- Morgan Freeman, Samuel L. Jackson, Mahershala Ali, and Denzel Washington are the most nominated in this category with 2 nominations.
- Louis Gossett Jr., Denzel Washington, Eddie Murphy, Mahershala Ali, and Daniel Kaluuya have won in this category.

=== Best Performance by an Actress in a Supporting Role in any Motion Picture ===
Year	Nominee	Motion Picture	Result
1960	Estelle Hemsley	Take a Giant Step	Nominated
1960	Juanita Moore	Imitation of Life (Academy Award nominee)	Nominated
1968	Beah Richards	Guess Who's Coming to Dinner (Academy Award nominee)	Nominated
1969	Abbey Lincoln	For Love of Ivy	Nominated
1986	Oprah Winfrey	The Color Purple (Academy Award nominee)	Nominated
1987	Cathy Tyson	Mona Lisa	Nominated
1991	Whoopi Goldberg	Ghost (Academy Award winner)	Won
1993	Alfre Woodard	Passion Fish	Nominated
1997	Marianne Jean-Baptiste	Secrets & Lies (Academy Award nominee)	Nominated
2003	Queen Latifah	Chicago (Academy Award nominee)	Nominated
2007	Jennifer Hudson	Dreamgirls (Academy Award winner)	Won
2009	Viola Davis	Doubt (Academy Award nominee)	Nominated
2010	Mo'Nique	Precious (Academy Award winner)	Won
2012	Octavia Spencer	The Help (Academy Award winner)	Won
2014	Lupita Nyong'o	12 Years a Slave (Academy Award winner)	Nominated
2017	Viola Davis	Fences (Academy Award winner)	Won
2017	Naomie Harris	Moonlight (Academy Award nominee)	Nominated
2017	Octavia Spencer	Hidden Figures (Academy Award nominee)	Nominated
2018	Mary J. Blige	Mudbound (Academy Award nominee)	Nominated
2018	Octavia Spencer	The Shape of Water (Academy Award nominee)	Nominated
2019	Regina King	If Beale Street Could Talk (Academy Award winner)	Won
2022	Ariana DeBose	West Side Story (Academy Award winner)	Won
2022	Aunjanue Ellis	King Richard (Academy Award nominee)	Nominated
2022	Ruth Negga	Passing	Nominated
2023	Angela Bassett	Black Panther: Wakanda Forever (Academy Award nominee)	Won
2024	Danielle Brooks	The Color Purple (Academy Award nominee)	Nominated
2024	Da’Vine Joy Randolph	The Holdovers (Academy Award winner)	Won
2025	Zoe Saldaña	Emilia Pérez (Academy Award winner)	Won
2026	Teyana Taylor	One Battle After Another (Academy Award nominee)	Won

Notes:

- Out of the 29 nominated performances, 24 went on to earn Academy Award nominations or wins.
- Octavia Spencer is the most nominated in this category with 3 nominations.
- Whoopi Goldberg, Jennifer Hudson, Mo'Nique, Octavia Spencer, Viola Davis, Regina King, Ariana DeBose, Angela Bassett, Da’Vine Joy Randolph, Zoe Saldaña, and Teyana Taylor have won in this category.

=== Best Motion Picture – Animated ===
Year	Nominee	Motion Picture	Result
2012	Peter Ramsey	Rise of the Guardians	Nominated
2019	Peter Ramsey	Spider-Man: Into the Spider-Verse (Academy Award winner)	Won
2024	Kemp Powers	Spider-Man: Across the Spider-Verse (Academy Award nominee)	Nominated

=== Best Director – Motion Picture ===
Year	Nominee	Motion Picture	Result
1990	Spike Lee	Do The Right Thing	Nominated
2014	Steve McQueen	12 Years a Slave (Academy Award nominee)	Nominated
2015	Ava DuVernay	Selma	Nominated
2017	Barry Jenkins	Moonlight (Academy Award nominee)	Nominated
2019	Spike Lee	BlacKkKlansman (Academy Award nominee)	Nominated
2021	Regina King	One Night in Miami...	Nominated
2026	Ryan Coogler	Sinners (Academy Award nominee)	Nominated

Notes:

- Out of the 7 nominees, 4 of them earned Academy Award nominations.
- Spike Lee is the most nominated in this category with 2 nominations.

=== Best Screenplay – Motion Picture ===
Year	Nominee	Motion Picture	Result
1985	Charles Fuller	A Soldier's Story (Academy Award nominee)	Nominated
1990	Spike Lee	Do The Right Thing (Academy Award nominee)	Nominated
2014	John Ridley	12 Years a Slave (Academy Award winner)	Nominated
2017	Barry Jenkins	Moonlight (Academy Award winner)	Nominated
2019	Barry Jenkins	If Beale Street Could Talk (Academy Award nominee)	Nominated
2026	Ryan Coogler	Sinners (Academy Award winner)	Nominated

Notes:

- Out of the 6 nominees, 6 of them earned Academy Award nominations or wins.
- Barry Jenkins is the most nominated in this category with 2 nominations.

=== Best Original Score – Motion Picture ===
Year	Name	Motion Picture	Result
1972	Isaac Hayes	Shaft (Academy Award nominee)	Won
1973	Quincy Jones	The Getaway	Nominated
1986	Quincy Jones	The Color Purple (Academy Award nominee)	Nominated
1987	Herbie Hancock	Round Midnight (Academy Award winner)	Nominated
1988	Jonas Gwangwa	Cry Freedom (Academy Award nominee)	Nominated
2017	Pharrell Williams	Hidden Figures	Nominated
2021	Jon Batiste	Soul (Academy Award winner)	Won
2025	Kris Bowers	The Wild Robot (Academy Award nominee)	Nominated

Notes:

- Out of the 8 nominees, 6 of them earned Academy Award nominations or wins.
- Quincy Jones is the most nominated in this category with 2 nominations.
- Isaac Hayes and Jon Batiste have won in this category.

=== Best Original Song – Motion Picture ===
Year	Nominee	Song title	Motion Picture	Result
1970	Quincy Jones	"The Time for Love is Anytime"	Cactus Flower	Nominated
1972	Quincy Jones	"Something More"	Honky	Nominated
1972	Isaac Hayes	"Theme from Shaft" (Academy Award winner)	Shaft	Nominated
1975	Curtis Mayfield	"On & On"	Claudine	Nominated
1977	Norman Whitfield	"Car Wash"	Car Wash	Nominated
1978	Donna Summer	"Down Deep Inside"	The Deep	Nominated
1982	Lionel Richie	"Endless Love" (Academy Award nominee)	Endless Love	Nominated
1984	Irene Cara	"Flashdance... What a Feeling" (Academy Award winner)	Flashdance	Won
1985	Prince	"When Doves Cry"	Purple Rain (Academy Award winner- Best Music, Original Song Score)	Nominated
1985	Ray Parker Jr.	"Ghostbusters" (Academy Award nominee)	Ghostbusters	Nominated
1985	Stevie Wonder	"I Just Called To Say I Love You" (Academy Award winner)	The Woman in Red	Won
1986	Lionel Richie	"Say You, Say Me" (Academy Award winner)	White Nights	Won
1989	Lamont Dozier	"Two Hearts" (Academy Award nominee)	Buster	Won
1994	Janet Jackson; Jimmy Jam; Terry Lewis	"Again" (Academy Award nominee)	Poetic Justice	Nominated
1994	James Ingram	"The Day I Fall In Love" (Academy Award nominee)	Beethoven's 2nd	Nominated
1995	James Ingram	"Look What Love Has Done" (Academy Award nominee)	Junior	Nominated
2000	Babyface	"How Can I Not Love You"	Anna and the King	Nominated
2005	Wyclef Jean; Jerry Duplessis	"Million Voices"	Hotel Rwanda	Nominated
2007	Seal	"A Father's Way"	The Pursuit of Happyness	Nominated
2007	Beyoncé	"Listen" (Academy Award nominee)	Dreamgirls	Nominated
2007	Prince	"The Song of the Heart"	Happy Feet	Won
2009	Beyoncé; Amanda Ghost	"Once in a Lifetime"	Cadillac Records	Nominated
2012	Mary J. Blige; Harvey Mason Jr. Damon Thomas	"The Living Proof"	The Help	Nominated
2012	Danger Mouse	"Ordinary Love"	Mandela: Long Walk to Freedom	Won
2015	Common; John Legend	"Glory" (Academy Award winner)	Selma	Won
2017	Stevie Wonder	"Faith"	Sing	Nominated
2018	Mary J. Blige; Raphael Saadiq; Taura Stinson	"Mighty River" (Academy Award nominee)	Mudbound	Nominated
2018	Mariah Carey	"The Star"	The Star	Nominated
2019	Kendrick Lamar; Anthony Tiffith; Mark Spears; Solana Rowe	"All the Stars" (Academy Award nominee)	Black Panther	Nominated
2020	Timothy McKenzie; Beyoncé	"Spirit"	The Lion King	Nominated
2020	Joshuah Brian Campbell; Cynthia Erivo	"Stand Up" (Academy Award nominee)	Harriet	Nominated
2021	H.E.R. Dernst Emile II; Tiara Thomas	"Fight For You" (Academy Award winner)	Judas and the Black Messiah	Nominated
2021	Leslie Odom Jr.	"Speak Now" (Academy Award nominee)	One Night in Miami...	Nominated
2021	Celeste Waite	"Hear My Voice" (Academy Award nominee)	The Trial of the Chicago 7	Nominated
2021	Raphael Saadiq; Andra Day	"Tigress & Tweed"	The United States vs. Billie Holiday	Nominated
2022	Dixson; Beyoncé Knowles-Carter	"Be Alive" (Academy Award nominee)	King Richard	Nominated
2022	Jennifer Hudson	"Here I Am (Singing My Way Home)"	Respect	Nominated
2023	Tems; Rihanna; Ryan Coogler	"Lift Me Up" (Academy Award nominee)	Black Panther: Wakanda Forever	Nominated
2024	Lenny Kravitz	"Road to Freedom"	Rustin	Nominated
2026	Raphael Saadiq	"I Lied to You" (Academy Award nominee)	Sinners	Nominated

== Television ==
=== Best Performance by an Actor in a Television Series – Drama ===
Year	Nominee	Series	Result
1986	Philip Michael Thomas	Miami Vice	Nominated
1991	James Earl Jones	Gabriel's Fire	Nominated
1992	James Earl Jones	Pros & Cons	Nominated
2001	Andre Braugher	Gideon's Crossing	Nominated
2006	Wentworth Miller	Prison Break	Nominated
2018	Sterling K. Brown	This Is Us	Won
2019	Stephan James	Homecoming	Nominated
2019	Billy Porter	Pose	Nominated
2020	Billy Porter	Pose	Nominated
2022	Billy Porter	Pose	Nominated
2022	Omar Sy	Lupin	Nominated
2025	Donald Glover	Mr. & Mrs. Smith	Nominated
2026	Sterling K. Brown	Paradise	Nominated

Notes:

- Billy Porter is the most nominated in this category with 3 nominations.
- Currently, Sterling K. Brown is the only winner in this category.

=== Best Performance by an Actress in a Television Series – Drama ===
Year	Nominee	Series	Result
1970	Denise Nicholas	Room 222	Nominated
1971	Denise Nicholas	Room 222	Nominated
1972	Denise Nicholas	Room 222	Nominated
1973	Gail Fisher	Mannix	Won
1975	Teresa Graves	Get Christie Love!	Nominated
1978	Leslie Uggams	Roots	Nominated
1993	Regina Taylor	I'll Fly Away	Won
2014	Kerry Washington	Scandal	Nominated
2015	Viola Davis	How to Get Away with Murder	Nominated
2016	Viola Davis	How to Get Away with Murder	Nominated
2016	Taraji P. Henson	Empire	Won
2022	Uzo Aduba	In Treatment	Nominated
2022	Michaela Jaé Rodriguez	Pose	Won
2023	Zendaya	Euphoria	Won

Notes:

- Denise Nicholas is the most nominated in this category with 3 nominations.
- Gail Fisher, Regina Taylor, Taraji P. Henson, Michaela Jaé Rodriguez, and Zendaya have won in this category.

=== Best Performance by an Actor in a Television Series – Musical or Comedy ===
Year	Name	Series	Status
1971	Flip Wilson	The Flip Wilson Show	Won
1972	Flip Wilson	The Flip Wilson Show	Nominated
1973	Flip Wilson	The Flip Wilson Show	Nominated
1973	Bill Cosby	The New Bill Cosby Show	Nominated
1973	Redd Foxx	Sanford and Son	Won
1974	Redd Foxx	Sanford and Son	Nominated
1975	Redd Foxx	Sanford and Son	Nominated
1976	Redd Foxx	Sanford and Son	Nominated
1977	Sammy Davis Jr.	Sammy & Company	Nominated
1983	Robert Guillaume	Benson	Nominated
1984	Robert Guillaume	Benson	Nominated
1985	Robert Guillaume	Benson	Nominated
1985	Sherman Hemsley	The Jeffersons	Nominated
1985	Bill Cosby	The Cosby Show	Won
1986	Bill Cosby	The Cosby Show	Won
1987	Bill Cosby	The Cosby Show	Nominated
1993	Will Smith	The Fresh Prince of Bel-Air	Nominated
1994	Will Smith	The Fresh Prince of Bel-Air	Nominated
2003	Bernie Mac	The Bernie Mac Show	Nominated
2004	Bernie Mac	The Bernie Mac Show	Nominated
2013	Don Cheadle	House of Lies	Won
2014	Don Cheadle	House of Lies	Nominated
2015	Don Cheadle	House of Lies	Nominated
2017	Anthony Anderson	black-ish	Nominated
2017	Donald Glover	Atlanta	Won
2018	Anthony Anderson	black-ish	Nominated
2019	Donald Glover	Atlanta	Nominated
2021	Don Cheadle	Black Monday	Nominated
2022	Anthony Anderson	black-ish	Nominated
2023	Donald Glover	Atlanta	Nominated

Notes:

- Redd Foxx, Bill Cosby, and Don Cheadle are the most nominated in this category with 4 nominations.
- Flip Wilson, Redd Foxx, Bill Cosby, Don Cheadle, and Donald Glover have won in this category.

=== Best Performance by an Actress in a Television Series – Musical or Comedy ===
Year	Nominee	Series	Result
1970	Diahann Carroll	Julia	Nominated
1975	Esther Rolle	Good Times	Nominated
1977	Isabel Sanford	The Jeffersons	Nominated
1978	Isabel Sanford	The Jeffersons	Nominated
1983	Isabel Sanford	The Jeffersons	Nominated
1983	Nell Carter	Gimme a Break!	Nominated
1983	Debbie Allen	Fame	Won
1984	Debbie Allen	Fame	Nominated
1984	Isabel Sanford	The Jeffersons	Nominated
1985	Isabel Sanford	The Jeffersons	Nominated
1985	Debbie Allen	Fame	Nominated
1985	Nell Carter	Gimme a Break!	Nominated
2017	Tracee Ellis Ross	black-ish	Won
2017	Issa Rae	Insecure	Nominated
2018	Issa Rae	Insecure	Nominated
2022	Issa Rae	Insecure	Nominated
2022	Tracee Ellis Ross	black-ish	Nominated
2023	Quinta Brunson	Abbott Elementary	Won
2024	Quinta Brunson	Abbott Elementary	Nominated
2024	Ayo Edebiri	The Bear	Won
2025	Quinta Brunson	Abbott Elementary	Nominated
2025	Ayo Edebiri	The Bear	Nominated
2026	Ayo Edebiri	The Bear	Nominated

Notes:

- Isabel Sanford is the most nominated in this category with 5 nominations.
- Debbie Allen, Tracee Ellis Ross, Quinta Brunson, and Ayo Edebiri have won in this category.

=== Best Performance by an Actor in a Limited Series, Anthology Series, or a Motion Picture Made for Television ===
Year	Name	Series	Status
1984	Louis Gossett Jr.	Sadat	Nominated
1992	Sidney Poitier	Separate but Equal	Nominated
1995	Samuel L. Jackson	Against The Wall	Nominated
1996	Laurence Fishburne	The Tuskegee Airmen	Nominated
1996	Charles S. Dutton	The Piano Lesson	Nominated
1998	Ving Rhames	Don King: Only in America	Won
2005	Mos Def	Something the Lord Made	Nominated
2005	Jamie Foxx	Redemption: The Stan Tookie Williams Story	Nominated
2007	Michael Ealy	Sleeper Cell	Nominated
2007	Andre Braugher	Thief	Nominated
2007	Chiwetel Ejiofor	Tsunami: The Aftermath	Nominated
2010	Chiwetel Ejiofor	Endgame	Nominated
2011	Idris Elba	Luther	Nominated
2012	Idris Elba	Luther	Won
2014	Idris Elba	Luther	Nominated
2014	Chiwetel Ejiofor	Dancing on the Edge	Nominated
2016	Idris Elba	Luther	Nominated
2016	David Oyelowo	Nightingale	Nominated
2017	Courtney B. Vance	The People v. O. J. Simpson: American Crime Story	Nominated
2024	David Oyelowo	Lawmen: Bass Reeves	Nominated
2026	Stephen Graham	Adolescence	Won

Notes:

- Idris Elba is the most nominated in this category with 4 nominations.
- Ving Rhames, Idris Elba, and Stephen Graham have won in this category.

=== Best Performance by an Actress in a Limited Series, Anthology Series, or a Motion Picture Made for Television ===
Year	Name	Series	Status
1992	Lynn Whitfield	The Josephine Baker Story	Nominated
1995	Diana Ross	Out of Darkness	Nominated
1998	Alfre Woodard	Miss Evers' Boys	Won
2000	Halle Berry	Introducing Dorothy Dandridge	Won
2001	Alfre Woodard	Holiday Heart	Nominated
2006	S. Epatha Merkerson	Lackawanna Blues	Won
2006	Halle Berry	Their Eyes Were Watching God	Nominated
2007	Sophie Okonedo	Tsunami: The Aftermath	Nominated
2008	Queen Latifah	Life Support	Won
2016	Queen Latifah	Bessie	Nominated
2017	Kerry Washington	Confirmation	Nominated
2019	Regina King	Seven Seconds	Nominated
2022	Cynthia Erivo	Genius: Aretha	Nominated
2026	Rashida Jones	Black Mirror	Nominated

Notes:

- Alfre Woodard, Halle Berry, and Queen Latifah are the most nominated in this category with 2 nominations.
- Alfre Woodard, Halle Berry, Queen Latifah, and S. Epatha Merkerson have won in this category.

=== Best Performance by an Actor in a Supporting Role on Television ===
Year	Name	Series	Status
1975	Whitman Mayo	Sanford and Son	Nominated
1975	Jimmie Walker	Good Times	Nominated
1976	Jimmie Walker	Good Times	Nominated
1985	Ben Vereen	Ellis Island	Nominated
1991	Blair Underwood	L.A. Law	Nominated
1992	Louis Gossett Jr.	The Josephine Baker Story	Won
1998	Eriq La Salle	ER	Nominated
1999	Don Cheadle	The Rat Pack	Won
2003	Dennis Haysbert	24	Nominated
2004	Jeffrey Wright	Angels in America	Won
2009	Blair Underwood	In Treatment	Nominated
2017	Sterling K. Brown	The People v. O. J. Simpson: American Crime Story	Nominated
2021	John Boyega	Small Axe	Won
2026	Tramell Tillman	Severance	Nominated
2026	Ashley Walters	Adolescence	Nominated

Notes:

- Jimmie Walker and Blair Underwood are the most nominated in this category with 2 nominations.
- Louis Gossett Jr., Don Cheadle, Jeffrey Wright, and John Boyega have won in this category.

=== Best Performance by an Actor in a Supporting Role in a Musical-Comedy or Drama Television Series ===
Year	Name	Series	Status
2023	Tyler James Williams	Abbott Elementary	Won

=== Best Performance by an Actress in a Supporting Role on Television ===
Year	Name	Series	Status
1971	Gail Fisher	Mannix	Won
1972	Gail Fisher	Mannix	Nominated
1974	Gail Fisher	Mannix	Nominated
1985	Marla Gibbs	The Jeffersons	Nominated
1989	Jackée	227	Nominated
1998	Della Reese	Touched by an Angel	Nominated
1998	Gloria Reuben	ER	Nominated
2015	Uzo Aduba	Orange is the New Black	Nominated
2016	Uzo Aduba	Orange is the New Black	Nominated
2016	Regina King	American Crime	Nominated
2017	Thandie Newton	Westworld	Nominated
2019	Thandie Newton	Westworld	Nominated
2025	Kali Reis	True Detective: Night Country	Nominated

Notes:

- Gail Fisher is the most nominated in this category with 3 nominations and is the only winner in this category.

=== Best Performance by an Actress in a Supporting Role in a Limited Series, Anthology Series, or a Motion Picture Made for Television ===
Year	Name	Series	Status
2023	Niecy Nash	Dahmer – Monster: The Jeffrey Dahmer Story	Nominated

=== Best Performance by an Actress in a Supporting Role in a Musical-Comedy or Drama Television Series ===
Year	Name	Series	Status
2023	Janelle James	Abbott Elementary	Nominated
2023	Sheryl Lee Ralph	Abbott Elementary	Nominated

=== Best Performance in Stand-Up Comedy on Television ===
Year	Name	Series	Status
2024	Trevor Noah	Trevor Noah: Where Was I	Nominated
2024	Chris Rock	Chris Rock: Selective Outrage	Nominated
2024	Wanda Sykes	Wanda Sykes: I'm an Entertainer	Nominated
2025	Jamie Foxx	Jamie Foxx: What Had Happened Was	Nominated
2026	Kevin Hart	Kevin Hart: Acting My Age	Nominated

== By acting categories ==
=== Film ===
==== Men ====
Year	Actor	Award	Motion Picture	Result
1955	Joe Adams	New Star – Actor	Carmen Jones	Won
1959	Sidney Poitier	Best Actor – Drama	The Defiant Ones	Nominated
1960	Sidney Poitier	Best Actor – Musical or Comedy	Porgy and Bess	Nominated
1962	Sidney Poitier	Best Actor – Drama	A Raisin in the Sun	Nominated
1964	Sidney Poitier	Best Actor – Drama	Lilies of the Field	Won
1966	Sidney Poitier	Best Actor – Drama	A Patch of Blue	Nominated
1968	Sidney Poitier	Best Actor – Drama	In the Heat of the Night	Nominated
1969	Ossie Davis	Best Supporting Actor	The Scalphunters	Nominated
1971	James Earl Jones	New Star – Actor	The Great White Hope	Won
1971	James Earl Jones	Best Actor – Drama	The Great White Hope	Nominated
1972	Richard Roundtree	New Star – Actor	Shaft	Nominated
1973	Kevin Hooks	New Star – Actor	Sounder	Nominated
1974	Carl Anderson	New Star – Actor	Jesus Christ Superstar	Nominated
1974	Carl Anderson	Best Actor – Musical or Comedy	Jesus Christ Superstar	Nominated
1974	Kirk Calloway	New Star – Actor	Cinderella Liberty	Nominated
1975	James Earl Jones	Best Actor – Musical or Comedy	Claudine	Nominated
1976	Ben Vereen	New Star – Actor	Funny Lady	Nominated
1982	Howard Rollins	New Star	Ragtime	Nominated
1982	Howard Rollins	Best Supporting Actor	Ragtime	Nominated
1983	Louis Gossett Jr.	Best Supporting Actor	An Officer and a Gentleman	Won
1983	Eddie Murphy	New Star – Actor	48 Hrs.	Nominated
1984	Eddie Murphy	Best Actor – Musical or Comedy	Trading Places	Nominated
1985	Eddie Murphy	Best Actor – Musical or Comedy	Beverly Hills Cop	Nominated
1985	Adolph Caesar	Best Supporting Actor	A Soldier's Story	Nominated
1987	Dexter Gordon	Best Actor – Drama	Round Midnight	Nominated
1988	Denzel Washington	Best Actor – Drama	Cry Freedom	Nominated
1988	Morgan Freeman	Best Supporting Actor	Street Smart	Nominated
1989	Forest Whitaker	Best Actor – Drama	Bird	Nominated
1990	Morgan Freeman	Best Actor – Musical or Comedy	Driving Miss Daisy	Won
1990	Denzel Washington	Best Supporting Actor	Glory	Won
1993	Denzel Washington	Best Actor – Drama	Malcolm X	Nominated
1995	Morgan Freeman	Best Actor – Drama	The Shawshank Redemption	Nominated
1995	Samuel L. Jackson	Best Supporting Actor	Pulp Fiction	Nominated
1997	Samuel L. Jackson	Best Supporting Actor	A Time to Kill	Nominated
1997	Cuba Gooding Jr.	Best Supporting Actor	Jerry Maguire	Nominated
1997	Eddie Murphy	Best Actor – Musical or Comedy	The Nutty Professor	Nominated
1998	Samuel L. Jackson	Best Actor – Musical or Comedy	Jackie Brown	Nominated
1998	Djimon Hounsou	Best Actor – Drama	Amistad	Nominated
2000	Denzel Washington	Best Actor – Drama	The Hurricane	Won
2000	Michael Clarke Duncan	Best Supporting Actor	The Green Mile	Nominated
2002	Will Smith	Best Actor – Drama	Ali	Nominated
2002	Denzel Washington	Best Actor – Drama	Training Day	Nominated
2005	Morgan Freeman	Best Supporting Actor	Million Dollar Baby	Nominated
2005	Jamie Foxx	Best Supporting Actor	Collateral	Nominated
2005	Jamie Foxx	Best Actor – Musical or Comedy	Ray	Won
2005	Don Cheadle	Best Actor – Drama	Hotel Rwanda	Nominated
2006	Terrence Howard	Best Actor – Drama	Hustle & Flow	Nominated
2007	Eddie Murphy	Best Supporting Actor	Dreamgirls	Won
2007	Chiwetel Ejiofor	Best Actor – Musical or Comedy	Kinky Boots	Nominated
2007	Will Smith	Best Actor – Drama	The Pursuit of Happyness	Nominated
2007	Forest Whitaker	Best Actor – Drama	The Last King of Scotland	Won
2008	Denzel Washington	Best Actor – Drama	American Gangster	Nominated
2010	Morgan Freeman	Best Actor – Drama	Invictus	Nominated
2013	Denzel Washington	Best Actor – Drama	Flight	Nominated
2014	Chiwetel Ejiofor	Best Actor – Drama	12 Years a Slave	Nominated
2014	Idris Elba	Best Actor – Drama	Mandela: Long Walk to Freedom	Nominated
2014	Barkhad Abdi	Best Supporting Actor	Captain Phillips	Nominated
2015	David Oyelowo	Best Actor – Drama	Selma	Nominated
2016	Will Smith	Best Actor – Drama	Concussion	Nominated
2016	Idris Elba	Best Supporting Actor	Beasts of No Nation	Nominated
2017	Denzel Washington	Best Actor – Drama	Fences	Nominated
2017	Mahershala Ali	Best Supporting Actor	Moonlight	Nominated
2018	Denzel Washington	Best Actor – Drama	Roman J. Israel, Esq.	Nominated
2018	Daniel Kaluuya	Best Actor – Musical or Comedy	Get Out	Nominated
2019	John David Washington	Best Actor – Drama	BlacKkKlansman	Nominated
2019	Mahershala Ali	Best Supporting Actor	Green Book	Won
2020	Eddie Murphy	Best Actor – Musical or Comedy	Dolemite Is My Name	Nominated
2021	Chadwick Boseman	Best Actor – Drama	Ma Rainey's Black Bottom	Won
2021	Daniel Kaluuya	Best Supporting Actor	Judas and the Black Messiah	Won
2021	Leslie Odom Jr.	Best Supporting Actor	One Night in Miami...	Nominated
2022	Mahershala Ali	Best Actor – Drama	Swan Song	Nominated
2022	Will Smith	Best Actor – Drama	King Richard	Won
2022	Denzel Washington	Best Actor – Drama	The Tragedy of Macbeth	Nominated
2023	Jeremy Pope	Best Actor – Drama	The Inspection	Nominated
2024	Colman Domingo	Best Actor – Drama	Rustin	Nominated
2024	Jeffrey Wright	Best Actor – Musical or Comedy	American Fiction	Nominated
2025	Colman Domingo	Best Actor – Drama	Sing Sing	Nominated
2025	Denzel Washington	Best Supporting Actor	Gladiator II	Nominated
2026	Dwayne Johnson	Best Actor – Drama	The Smashing Machine	Nominated
2026	Michael B. Jordan	Best Actor – Drama	Sinners	Nominated

==== Women ====
Year	Actor	Award	Motion Picture	Result
1960	Estelle Hemsley	Best Supporting Actress	Take a Giant Step	Nominated
1960	Juanita Moore	Best Supporting Actress	Imitation of Life	Nominated
1960	Dorothy Dandridge	Best Actress – Musical or Comedy	Porgy and Bess	Nominated
1962	Claudia McNeil	Best Actress – Drama	A Raisin in the Sun	Nominated
1968	Beah Richards	Best Supporting Actress	Guess Who's Coming to Dinner	Nominated
1969	Abbey Lincoln	Best Supporting Actress	For Love of Ivy	Nominated
1971	Lola Falana	New Star – Actress	The Liberation of L.B. Jones	Nominated
1973	Diana Ross	New Star – Actress	Lady Sings the Blues	Won
1973	Diana Ross	Best Actress – Drama	Lady Sings the Blues	Nominated
1973	Cicely Tyson	Best Actress – Drama	Sounder	Nominated
1975	Diahann Carroll	Best Actress – Musical or Comedy	Claudine	Nominated
1977	Gladys Knight	New Star – Actress	Pipe Dreams	Nominated
1981	Irene Cara	Best Actress – Musical or Comedy	Fame	Nominated
1984	Jennifer Beals	Best Actress – Musical or Comedy	Flashdance	Nominated
1986	Oprah Winfrey	Best Supporting Actress	The Color Purple	Nominated
1986	Whoopi Goldberg	Best Actress – Drama	The Color Purple	Won
1987	Cathy Tyson	Best Supporting Actress	Mona Lisa	Nominated
1991	Whoopi Goldberg	Best Supporting Actress	Ghost	Won
1993	Whoopi Goldberg	Best Actress – Musical or Comedy	Sister Act	Nominated
1993	Alfre Woodard	Best Supporting Actress	Passion Fish	Nominated
1994	Angela Bassett	Best Actress – Musical or Comedy	What's Love Got to Do with It	Won
1997	Marianne Jean-Baptiste	Best Supporting Actress	Secrets & Lies	Nominated
1998	Pam Grier	Best Actress – Musical or Comedy	Jackie Brown	Nominated
2002	Halle Berry	Best Actress – Drama	Monster's Ball	Nominated
2003	Queen Latifah	Best Supporting Actress	Chicago	Nominated
2007	Jennifer Hudson	Best Supporting Actress	Dreamgirls	Won
2007	Beyoncé	Best Actress – Musical or Comedy	Dreamgirls	Nominated
2009	Rebecca Hall	Best Actress – Musical or Comedy	Vicky Cristina Barcelona	Nominated
2009	Viola Davis	Best Supporting Actress	Doubt	Nominated
2010	Mo'Nique	Best Supporting Actress	Precious	Won
2010	Gabourey Sidibe	Best Actress – Drama	Precious	Nominated
2011	Halle Berry	Best Actress – Drama	Frankie and Alice	Nominated
2012	Viola Davis	Best Actress – Drama	The Help	Nominated
2012	Octavia Spencer	Best Supporting Actress	The Help	Won
2014	Lupita Nyong'o	Best Supporting Actress	12 Years a Slave	Nominated
2015	Quvenzhané Wallis	Best Actress – Musical or Comedy	Annie	Nominated
2017	Ruth Negga	Best Actress – Drama	Loving	Nominated
2017	Viola Davis	Best Supporting Actress	Fences	Won
2017	Naomie Harris	Best Supporting Actress	Moonlight	Nominated
2017	Octavia Spencer	Best Supporting Actress	Hidden Figures	Nominated
2018	Mary J. Blige	Best Supporting Actress	Mudbound	Nominated
2018	Octavia Spencer	Best Supporting Actress	The Shape of Water	Nominated
2019	Regina King	Best Supporting Actress	If Beale Street Could Talk	Won
2020	Cynthia Erivo	Best Actress – Drama	Harriet	Nominated
2021	Viola Davis	Best Actress – Drama	Ma Rainey's Black Bottom	Nominated
2021	Andra Day	Best Actress – Drama	The United States vs. Billie Holiday	Won
2022	Ariana DeBose	Best Supporting Actress	West Side Story	Won
2022	Aunjanue Ellis	Best Supporting Actress	King Richard	Nominated
2022	Ruth Negga	Best Supporting Actress	Passing	Nominated
2023	Viola Davis	Best Actress – Drama	The Woman King	Nominated
2023	Angela Bassett	Best Supporting Actress	Black Panther: Wakanda Forever	Won
2024	Fantasia Barrino	Best Actress – Musical or Comedy	The Color Purple	Nominated
2024	Danielle Brooks	Best Supporting Actress	The Color Purple	Nominated
2024	Da’Vine Joy Randolph	Best Supporting Actress	The Holdovers	Won
2025	Cynthia Erivo	Best Actress – Musical or Comedy	Wicked	Nominated
2025	Zendaya	Best Actress – Musical or Comedy	Challengers	Nominated
2025	Zoe Saldaña	Best Supporting Actress	Emilia Pérez	Won
2026	Tessa Thompson	Best Actress – Drama	Hedda	Nominated
2026	Cynthia Erivo	Best Actress – Musical or Comedy	Wicked: For Good	Nominated
2026	Chase Infiniti	Best Actress – Musical or Comedy	One Battle After Another	Nominated
2026	Teyana Taylor	Best Supporting Actress	One Battle After Another	Won

=== Television ===
==== Men ====
Year	Actor	Award	Series	Result
1967	Bill Cosby	Best TV Star – Male	I Spy	Nominated
1971	Flip Wilson	Best Actor – Musical or Comedy Series	The Flip Wilson Show	Won
1972	Flip Wilson	Best Actor – Musical or Comedy Series	The Flip Wilson Show	Nominated
1973	Flip Wilson	Best Actor – Musical or Comedy Series	The Flip Wilson Show	Nominated
1973	Bill Cosby	Best Actor – Musical or Comedy Series	The New Bill Cosby Show	Nominated
1973	Redd Foxx	Best Actor – Musical or Comedy Series	Sanford and Son	Won
1974	Redd Foxx	Best Actor – Musical or Comedy Series	Sanford and Son	Nominated
1975	Redd Foxx	Best Actor – Musical or Comedy Series	Sanford and Son	Nominated
1975	Whitman Mayo	Best Supporting Actor	Sanford and Son	Nominated
1975	Jimmie Walker	Best Supporting Actor	Good Times	Nominated
1976	Jimmie Walker	Best Supporting Actor	Good Times	Nominated
1976	Redd Foxx	Best Actor – Musical or Comedy Series	Sanford and Son	Nominated
1977	Sammy Davis Jr.	Best Actor – Musical or Comedy Series	Sammy & Company	Nominated
1983	Robert Guillaume	Best Actor – Musical or Comedy Series	Benson	Nominated
1984	Robert Guillaume	Best Actor – Musical or Comedy Series	Benson	Nominated
1984	Louis Gossett Jr.	Best Actor – Miniseries or Television Film	Sadat	Nominated
1985	Ben Vereen	Best Supporting Actor	Ellis Island	Nominated
1985	Robert Guillaume	Best Actor – Musical or Comedy Series	Benson	Nominated
1985	Sherman Hemsley	Best Actor – Musical or Comedy Series	The Jeffersons	Nominated
1985	Bill Cosby	Best Actor – Musical or Comedy Series	The Cosby Show	Won
1986	Bill Cosby	Best Actor – Musical or Comedy Series	The Cosby Show	Won
1986	Philip Michael Thomas	Best Actor – Drama Series	Miami Vice	Nominated
1987	Bill Cosby	Best Actor – Musical or Comedy Series	The Cosby Show	Nominated
1991	Blair Underwood	Best Supporting Actor	L.A. Law	Nominated
1991	James Earl Jones	Best Actor – Drama Series	Gabriel's Fire	Nominated
1992	James Earl Jones	Best Actor – Drama Series	Pros & Cons	Nominated
1992	Louis Gossett Jr.	Best Supporting Actor	The Josephine Baker Story	Won
1992	Sidney Poitier	Best Actor – Miniseries or Television Film	Separate but Equal	Nominated
1993	Will Smith	Best Actor – Musical or Comedy Series	The Fresh Prince of Bel-Air	Nominated
1994	Will Smith	Best Actor – Musical or Comedy Series	The Fresh Prince of Bel-Air	Nominated
1995	Samuel L. Jackson	Best Actor – Miniseries or Television Film	Against the Wall	Nominated
1996	Charles S. Dutton	Best Actor – Miniseries or Television Film	The Piano Lesson	Nominated
1996	Laurence Fishburne	Best Actor – Miniseries or Television Film	The Tuskegee Airmen	Nominated
1998	Ving Rhames	Best Actor – Miniseries or Television Film	Don King: Only in America	Won
1998	Eriq La Salle	Best Supporting Actor	ER	Nominated
1999	Don Cheadle	Best Supporting Actor	The Rat Pack	Won
2001	Andre Braugher	Best Actor – Drama Series	Gideon's Crossing	Nominated
2003	Dennis Haysbert	Best Supporting Actor	24	Nominated
2003	Bernie Mac	Best Actor – Musical or Comedy Series	The Bernie Mac Show	Nominated
2004	Bernie Mac	Best Actor – Musical or Comedy Series	The Bernie Mac Show	Nominated
2004	Jeffrey Wright	Best Supporting Actor	Angels in America	Won
2005	Mos Def	Best Actor – Miniseries or Television Film	Something the Lord Made	Nominated
2005	Jamie Foxx	Best Actor – Miniseries or Television Film	Redemption: The Stan Tookie Williams Story	Nominated
2006	Wentworth Miller	Best Actor – Drama Series	Prison Break	Nominated
2007	Andre Braugher	Best Actor – Miniseries or Television Film	Thief	Nominated
2007	Michael Ealy	Best Actor – Miniseries or Television Film	Sleeper Cell	Nominated
2007	Chiwetel Ejiofor	Best Actor – Miniseries or Television Film	Tsunami: The Aftermath	Nominated
2009	Blair Underwood	Best Supporting Actor	In Treatment	Nominated
2010	Chiwetel Ejiofor	Best Actor – Miniseries or Television Film	Endgame	Nominated
2011	Idris Elba	Best Actor – Miniseries or Television Film	Luther	Nominated
2012	Idris Elba	Best Actor – Miniseries or Television Film	Luther	Won
2013	Don Cheadle	Best Actor – Musical or Comedy Series	House of Lies	Won
2014	Don Cheadle	Best Actor – Musical or Comedy Series	House of Lies	Nominated
2014	Chiwetel Ejiofor	Best Actor – Miniseries or Television Film	Dancing on the Edge	Nominated
2014	Idris Elba	Best Actor – Miniseries or Television Film	Luther	Nominated
2015	Don Cheadle	Best Actor – Musical or Comedy Series	House of Lies	Nominated
2016	Idris Elba	Best Actor – Miniseries or Television Film	Luther	Nominated
2016	David Oyelowo	Best Actor – Miniseries or Television Film	Nightingale	Nominated
2017	Anthony Anderson	Best Actor – Musical or Comedy Series	black-ish	Nominated
2017	Donald Glover	Best Actor – Musical or Comedy Series	Atlanta	Won
2017	Courtney B. Vance	Best Actor – Miniseries or Television Film	The People v. O. J. Simpson: American Crime Story	Nominated
2017	Sterling K. Brown	Best Supporting Actor	The People v. O. J. Simpson: American Crime Story	Nominated
2018	Sterling K. Brown	Best Actor – Drama Series	This Is Us	Won
2018	Anthony Anderson	Best Actor – Musical or Comedy Series	black-ish	Nominated
2019	Stephan James	Best Actor – Drama Series	Homecoming	Nominated
2019	Billy Porter	Best Actor – Drama Series	Pose	Nominated
2019	Donald Glover	Best Actor – Musical or Comedy Series	Atlanta	Nominated
2020	Billy Porter	Best Actor – Drama Series	Pose	Nominated
2021	Don Cheadle	Best Actor – Musical or Comedy Series	Black Monday	Nominated
2021	John Boyega	Best Supporting Actor	Small Axe	Won
2022	Billy Porter	Best Actor – Drama Series	Pose	Nominated
2022	Omar Sy	Best Actor – Drama Series	Lupin	Nominated
2022	Anthony Anderson	Best Actor – Musical or Comedy Series	black-ish	Nominated
2023	Donald Glover	Best Actor – Musical or Comedy Series	Atlanta	Nominated
2023	Tyler James Williams	Best Supporting Actor - Musical-Comedy or Drama Series	Abbott Elementary	Won
2024	David Oyelowo	Best Actor – Miniseries or Television Film	Lawmen: Bass Reeves	Nominated
2025	Donald Glover	Best Actor – Drama Series	Mr. & Mrs. Smith	Nominated
2026	Sterling K. Brown	Best Actor – Drama Series	Paradise	Nominated
2026	Stephen Graham	Best Actor – Miniseries or Television Film	Adolescence	Won
2026	Tramell Tillman	Best Supporting Actor	Severance	Nominated
2026	Ashley Walters	Best Supporting Actor	Adolescence	Nominated

==== Women ====
Year	Actor	Award	Series	Result
1969	Diahann Carroll	Best TV Star – Female	Julia	Won
1970	Diahann Carroll	Best Actress – Musical or Comedy Series	Julia	Nominated
1970	Denise Nicholas	Best Actress – Drama Series	Room 222	Nominated
1971	Denise Nicholas	Best Actress – Drama Series	Room 222	Nominated
1971	Gail Fisher	Best Supporting Actress	Mannix	Won
1972	Gail Fisher	Best Supporting Actress	Mannix	Nominated
1972	Denise Nicholas	Best Actress – Drama Series	Room 222	Nominated
1973	Gail Fisher	Best Actress – Drama Series	Mannix	Won
1974	Gail Fisher	Best Supporting Actress	Mannix	Nominated
1975	Teresa Graves	Best Actress – Drama Series	Get Christie Love!	Nominated
1975	Esther Rolle	Best Actress – Musical or Comedy Series	Good Times	Nominated
1977	Isabel Sanford	Best Actress – Musical or Comedy Series	The Jeffersons	Nominated
1978	Isabel Sanford	Best Actress – Musical or Comedy Series	The Jeffersons	Nominated
1978	Leslie Uggams	Best Actress – Drama Series	Roots	Nominated
1983	Debbie Allen	Best Actress – Musical or Comedy Series	Fame	Won
1983	Nell Carter	Best Actress – Musical or Comedy Series	Gimme a Break!	Nominated
1983	Isabel Sanford	Best Actress – Musical or Comedy Series	The Jeffersons	Nominated
1984	Isabel Sanford	Best Actress – Musical or Comedy Series	The Jeffersons	Nominated
1984	Debbie Allen	Best Actress – Musical or Comedy Series	Fame	Nominated
1985	Debbie Allen	Best Actress – Musical or Comedy Series	Fame	Nominated
1985	Nell Carter	Best Actress – Musical or Comedy Series	Gimme a Break!	Nominated
1985	Isabel Sanford	Best Actress – Musical or Comedy Series	The Jeffersons	Nominated
1985	Marla Gibbs	Best Supporting Actress	The Jeffersons	Nominated
1989	Jackée	Best Supporting Actress	227	Nominated
1992	Lynn Whitfield	Best Actress – Miniseries or Television Film	The Josephine Baker Story	Nominated
1993	Regina Taylor	Best Actress – Drama Series	I'll Fly Away	Won
1995	Diana Ross	Best Actress – Miniseries or Television Film	Out of Darkness	Nominated
1998	Della Reese	Best Supporting Actress	Touched by an Angel	Nominated
1998	Gloria Reuben	Best Supporting Actress	ER	Nominated
1998	Alfre Woodard	Best Actress – Miniseries or Television Film	Miss Evers' Boys	Won
2000	Halle Berry	Best Actress – Miniseries or Television Film	Introducing Dorothy Dandridge	Won
2001	Alfre Woodard	Best Actress – Miniseries or Television Film	Holiday Heart	Nominated
2006	Halle Berry	Best Actress – Miniseries or Television Film	Their Eyes Were Watching God	Nominated
2006	S. Epatha Merkerson	Best Actress – Miniseries or Television Film	Lackawanna Blues	Won
2007	Sophie Okonedo	Best Actress – Miniseries or Television Film	Tsunami: The Aftermath	Nominated
2008	Queen Latifah	Best Actress – Miniseries or Television Film	Life Support	Won
2014	Kerry Washington	Best Actress – Drama Series	Scandal	Nominated
2015	Viola Davis	Best Actress – Drama Series	How to Get Away with Murder	Nominated
2015	Uzo Aduba	Best Supporting Actress	Orange Is the New Black	Nominated
2016	Viola Davis	Best Actress – Drama Series	How to Get Away with Murder	Nominated
2016	Taraji P. Henson	Best Actress – Drama Series	Empire	Won
2016	Queen Latifah	Best Actress – Miniseries or Television Film	Bessie	Nominated
2016	Uzo Aduba	Best Supporting Actress	Orange Is the New Black	Nominated
2016	Regina King	Best Supporting Actress	American Crime	Nominated
2017	Issa Rae	Best Actress – Musical or Comedy Series	Insecure	Nominated
2017	Tracee Ellis Ross	Best Actress – Musical or Comedy Series	black-ish	Won
2017	Kerry Washington	Best Actress – Miniseries or Television Film	Confirmation	Nominated
2017	Thandie Newton	Best Supporting Actress	Westworld	Nominated
2018	Issa Rae	Best Actress – Musical or Comedy Series	Insecure	Nominated
2019	Regina King	Best Actress – Miniseries or Television Film	Seven Seconds	Nominated
2019	Thandie Newton	Best Supporting Actress	Westworld	Nominated
2022	Uzo Aduba	Best Actress – Drama Series	In Treatment	Nominated
2022	Michaela Jaé Rodriguez	Best Actress – Drama Series	Pose	Won
2022	Issa Rae	Best Actress – Musical or Comedy Series	Insecure	Nominated
2022	Tracee Ellis Ross	Best Actress – Musical or Comedy Series	black-ish	Nominated
2022	Cynthia Erivo	Best Actress – Miniseries or Television Film	Genius: Aretha	Nominated
2023	Zendaya	Best Actress – Drama Series	Euphoria	Won
2023	Quinta Brunson	Best Actress – Musical or Comedy Series	Abbott Elementary	Won
2023	Niecy Nash	Best Supporting Actress - Miniseries or Television Film	Dahmer – Monster: The Jeffrey Dahmer Story	Nominated
2023	Janelle James	Best Supporting Actress - Musical-Comedy or Drama Series	Abbott Elementary	Nominated
2023	Sheryl Lee Ralph	Best Supporting Actress - Musical-Comedy or Drama Series	Abbott Elementary	Nominated
2024	Quinta Brunson	Best Actress – Musical or Comedy Series	Abbott Elementary	Nominated
2024	Ayo Edebiri	Best Actress – Musical or Comedy Series	The Bear	Won
2025	Quinta Brunson	Best Actress – Musical or Comedy Series	Abbott Elementary	Nominated
2025	Ayo Edebiri	Best Actress – Musical or Comedy Series	The Bear	Nominated
2025	Kali Reis	Best Supporting Actress	True Detective: Night Country	Nominated
2026	Ayo Edebiri	Best Actress – Musical or Comedy Series	The Bear	Nominated
2026	Rashida Jones	Best Actress – Miniseries or Television Film	Black Mirror	Nominated

== Directing category ==
Year	Nominee	Award	Motion Picture	Result
1990	Spike Lee	Best Director – Motion Picture	Do the Right Thing	Nominated
2014	Steve McQueen	Best Director – Motion Picture	12 Years a Slave	Nominated
2015	Ava DuVernay	Best Director – Motion Picture	Selma	Nominated
2017	Barry Jenkins	Best Director – Motion Picture	Moonlight	Nominated
2019	Spike Lee	Best Director – Motion Picture	BlacKkKlansman	Nominated
2021	Regina King	Best Director – Motion Picture	One Night in Miami...	Nominated
2026	Ryan Coogler	Best Director – Motion Picture	Sinners	Nominated

== See also ==
- List of black Academy Award winners and nominees
- List of Asian Golden Globe winners and nominees
- List of Golden Globe Awards ceremonies
- List of Golden Globe winners
