= List of Golden Globe Awards ceremonies =

The Golden Globes ceremony, formerly the Golden Globe Awards until 2025, is an American awards season event hosted by Dick Clark Productions that recognizes excellence in domestic and international film and television. The awards themselves are bestowed by the 93 members of the Golden Globe Foundation at a formal ceremony and dinner held every January at which the awards are presented and form part of the film industry's awards season, which culminates each year with the Academy Awards.

== List of ceremonies ==
#	Date	Year	Host
1st	January 20, 1944	1943 in film	None
2nd	April 16, 1945	1944 in film	None
3rd	March 30, 1946	1945 in film	None
4th	February 26, 1947	1946 in film	None
5th	March 10, 1948	1947 in film	None
6th	March 16, 1949	1948 in film	None
7th	February 23, 1950	1949 in film	None
8th	February 28, 1951	1950 in film	George Jessel
9th	February 21, 1952	1951 in film	None
10th	February 26, 1953	1952 in film	None
11th	January 22, 1954	1953 in film	None
12th	February 24, 1955	1954 in film	None
13th	February 23, 1956	1955 in film	None
14th	February 28, 1957	1956 in film/1956 in television	None
15th	February 22, 1958	1957 in film/1957 in television	None
16th	March 5, 1959	1958 in film/1958 in television	None
17th	March 10, 1960	1959 in film/1959 in television	None
18th	March 16, 1961	1960 in film/1960 in television	None
19th	March 5, 1962	1961 in film/1961 in television	None
20th	March 5, 1963	1962 in film/1962 in television	None
21st	March 11, 1964	1963 in film/1963 in television	None
22nd	February 8, 1965	1964 in film/1964 in television	None
23rd	February 28, 1966	1965 in film/1965 in television	None
24th	February 15, 1967	1966 in film/1966 in television	None
25th	February 12, 1968	1967 in film/1967 in television	None
26th	February 24, 1969	1968 in film/1968 in television	None
27th	February 2, 1970	1969 in film/1969 in television	None
28th	February 5, 1971	1970 in film/1970 in television	None
29th	February 6, 1972	1971 in film/1971 in television	None
30th	January 28, 1973	1972 in film/1972 in television	None
31st	January 26, 1974	1973 in film/1973 in television	None
32nd	January 25, 1975	1974 in film/1974 in television	None
33rd	January 24, 1976	1975 in film/1975 in television	None
34th	January 29, 1977	1976 in film/1976 in television	None
35th	January 28, 1978	1977 in film/1977 in television	None
36th	January 27, 1979	1978 in film/1978 in television	None
37th	January 26, 1980	1979 in film/1979 in television	None
38th	January 31, 1981	1980 in film/1980 in american television	None
39th	January 30, 1982	1981 in film/1981 in television	Robert Preston & Linda Gray
40th	January 29, 1983	1982 in film/1982 in american television	None
41st	January 28, 1984	1983 in film/1983 in american television	John Forsythe & Julie Walters
42nd	January 27, 1985	1984 in film/1984 in american television	Michael York & Raquel Welch
43rd	January 24, 1986	1985 in film/1985 in television	Charlton Heston & Donna Mills
44th	January 31, 1987	1986 in film/1986 in american television	Cheryl Ladd & William Shatner
45th	January 23, 1988	1987 in film/1987 in american television	Patrick Duffy & Dyan Cannon
46th	January 28, 1989	1988 in film/1988 in television	George Hamilton & Joan Collins
47th	January 20, 1990	1989 in film/1989 in television	Sam Elliott & Cybill Shepherd
48th	January 19, 1991	1990 in film/1990 in television	Dana Delany & Steve Guttenberg
49th	January 18, 1992	1991 in film/1991 in television	Jacqueline Bisset & Pierce Brosnan
50th	January 24, 1993	1992 in film/1992 in television	Louis Gossett Jr., Leslie Nielsen & Jane Seymour
51st	January 22, 1994	1993 in film/1993 in television	Faye Dunaway & Tim Curry
52nd	January 21, 1995	1994 in film/1994 in television	John Larroquette & Janine Turner
53rd	January 21, 1996	1995 in film/1995 in television	None
54th	January 19, 1997	1996 in film/1996 in television	None
55th	January 18, 1998	1997 in film/1997 in television	None
56th	January 24, 1999	1998 in film/1998 in television	None
57th	January 23, 2000	1999 in film/1999 in television	None
58th	January 21, 2001	2000 in film/2000 in television	None
59th	January 20, 2002	2001 in film/2001 in television	None
60th	January 19, 2003	2002 in film/2002 in television	None
61st	January 25, 2004	2003 in film/2003 in television	None
62nd	January 16, 2005	2004 in film/2004 in television	None
63rd	January 16, 2006	2005 in film/2005 in television	None
64th	January 15, 2007	2006 in film/2006 in television	None
65th	January 13, 2008 (Note: Due to 2007–2008 Writers Guild of America strike, ceremony was canceled, and a press conference announcing the winners was held instead.)	2007 in film/2007 in television	None
66th	January 11, 2009	2008 in film/2008 in television	None
67th	January 17, 2010	2009 in film/2009 in television	Ricky Gervais
68th	January 16, 2011	2010 in film/2010 in television	Ricky Gervais
69th	January 15, 2012	2011 in film/2011 in television	Ricky Gervais
70th	January 13, 2013	2012 in film/2012 in television	Tina Fey & Amy Poehler
71st	January 12, 2014	2013 in film/2013 in television	Tina Fey & Amy Poehler
72nd	January 11, 2015	2014 in film/2014 in television	Tina Fey & Amy Poehler
73rd	January 10, 2016	2015 in film/2015 in television	Ricky Gervais
74th	January 8, 2017	2016 in film/2016 in television	Jimmy Fallon
75th	January 7, 2018	2017 in film/2017 in television	Seth Meyers
76th	January 6, 2019	2018 in film/2018 in television	Andy Samberg & Sandra Oh
77th	January 5, 2020	2019 in film/2019 in television	Ricky Gervais
78th	February 28, 2021	2020 in film/2020 in television	Tina Fey & Amy Poehler
79th	January 9, 2022	2021 in film/2021 in television	None
80th	January 10, 2023	2022 in film/2022 in television	Jerrod Carmichael
81st	January 7, 2024	2023 in film/2023 in television	Jo Koy
82nd	January 5, 2025	2024 in film/2024 in television	Nikki Glaser
83rd	January 11, 2026	2025 in film/2025 in television	Nikki Glaser
84th	January 10, 2027	2026 in film/2026 in television	Nikki Glaser

== See also ==
- List of black Golden Globe Award winners and nominees
