= Louis S. Peterson =

American playwright, professor (1922–1998)

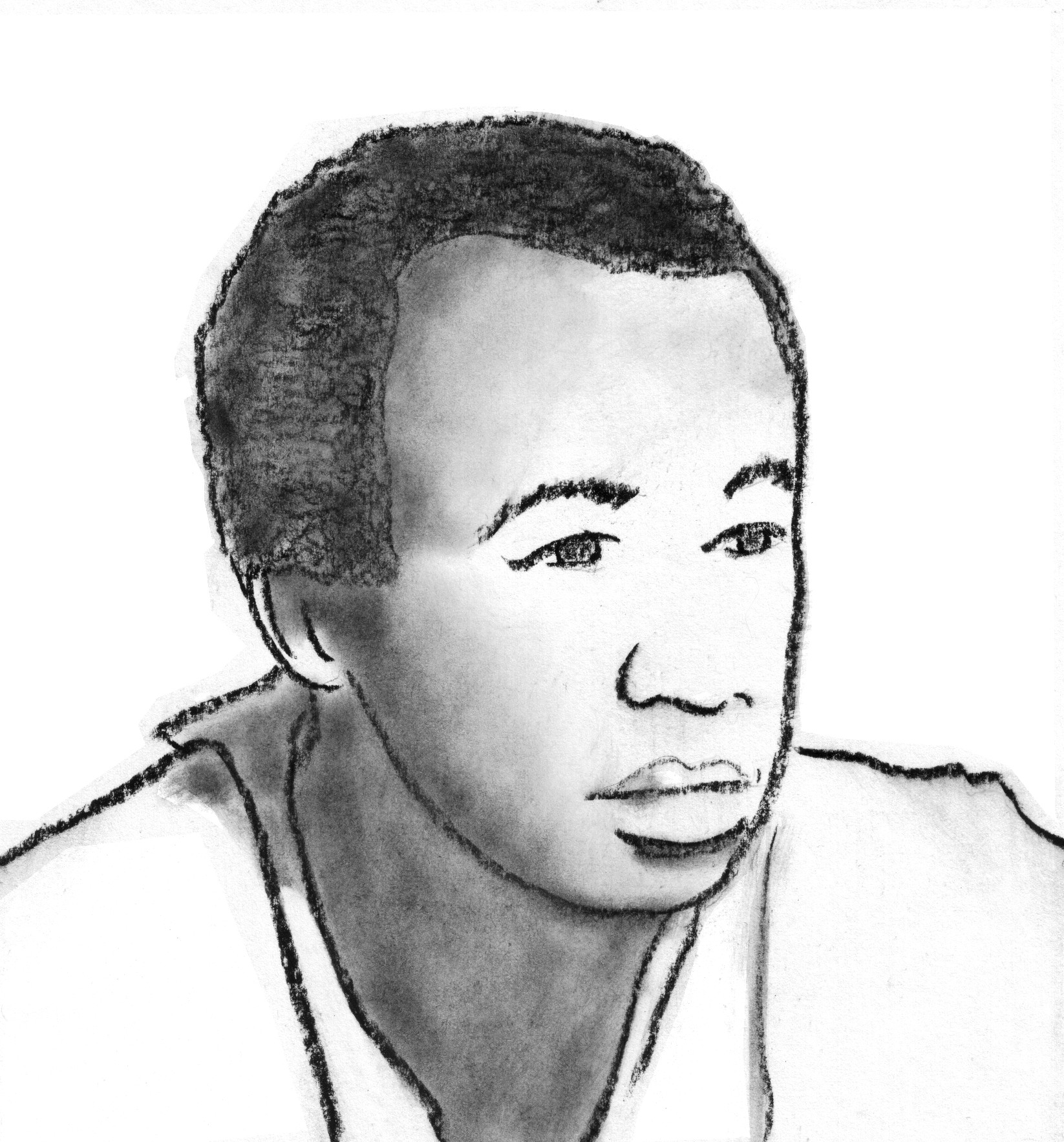
- Born: Louis Stamford Peterson; 17 June 1922; Hartford, Connecticut, USA
- Died: April 27, 1998 (aged 75); New York, New York, USA
- Occupations: Playwright, screenwriter
- Spouse: Peggy Feury (m. 1952; div. 1961)

Louis Stamford Peterson (June 17, 1922 – April 27, 1998) was an American playwright, actor, screenwriter, and professor. He was an American playwright and one of the first African-American playwrights to have a dramatic play produced on Broadway. He was also one of the first African-American writers to be nominated for an Emmy Award.

== Biography ==
Louis Stamford Peterson was born in Hartford, Connecticut on June 17, 1922. His father was Louis Peterson Sr., and his mother was Ruth Conover Peterson, who both worked in the banking business. He lived in the Hartford's South End, went to public schools, and graduated from Connecticut's Bulkeley High School in 1940. Peterson first planned to get a degree in music. In 1944 he graduated from Morehouse College earning a B.A. in English. In college he became involved in the Little Theatre and performed onstage. He attended Yale University (1944 to 1945), and then earned an M.A. in drama from New York University in 1947.

In New York Peterson performed in Off-Broadway plays, and studied acting with noted teacher, Sanford Meisner, at the Neighborhood Playhouse, and he also studied at the Actors Studio. He studied playwriting, and worked closely with Clifford Odets. His first play, Take a Giant Step, was written while he was touring as an actor and stage manager in Carson McCullers' play, The Member of the Wedding.

On July 21, 1952, he married Peggy Feury. The marriage ended after nine years in 1961. After the divorce, Peterson's semi-autobiographical play Entertain a Ghost was produced. It told the story of a marriage between a playwright and actress, that was thought to have parallels to Peterson and Feury's relationship. The Village Voice gave it a positive review that said the play should have run longer, and described it as "a daring and deeply exploratory new play, the best damned failure I've seen in years”.

== Take a Giant Step ==
It was a significant step in Peterson's career when his first full-length play, Take a Giant Step, opened on Broadway in 1953. The Broadway-tryout performances began in Hartford, Connecticut in 1953 at the New Parsons Theatre. The legendary actress Helen Hayes helped get the play produced. Then on Broadway at the Lyceum Theater, the play was welcomed with critical acclaim. The story focuses on the challenges of a black youth growing up in a white neighborhood. It starred 17-year-old Louis Gossett Jr., who was a senior at Lincoln High School in Brooklyn. It ran for eight weeks at the Lyceum Theater. The New York Times listed it as one of the ten best plays of the season. In 1956, it was revived off-Broadway for 246 performances and featured a performance by Godfrey Cambridge.

An article in the May 1991 issue of the magazine Jump Cut considers in detail Peterson's play and screenplay, Take a Giant Step. The journal describes what Peterson's work means culturally, how it broke down barriers, and surmounted obstacles. The article also describes those who were involved in making it a success and a pioneering work.

Take a Giant Step opened on Broadway and ran from September 24 to November 28, 1953. It was directed by John Stix, the costumes were designed by Ruth Morley and the cast featured Louis Gossett Jr. as Spencer, Estelle Hemsley as the grandmother, Maxine Sullivan as Christine, Jane White as Carol, Warren Berlinger as Johnny, Pauline Myers as Violet, Estelle Evans as May, Dorothy Carter as Christine, and Frank H. Wilson as Frank.

Take a Giant Step opened off-Broadway on September 25, 1956, at the Jan Hus Playhouse and closed May 12, 1957. The cast featured Godfrey Cambridge, Cecil Cunningham, Frances Foster, Bill Gunn, Rosetta LeNoire, Beah Richards, Louis Gossett Jr., and Lincoln Kilpatrick.

In the film of Take a Giant Step, the executive producer was Burt Lancaster, the part of Spencer Scott was played by Johnny Nash, a popular rock-and-roll performer, who sang the hit song "I Can See Clearly Now". Ruby Dee played Christine, and Spencer Scott's father was played by Frederick O'Neal, who co-founded the American Negro Theatre. O'Neal also played the part on Broadway.

The story is about a black teen, Spencer, living in white community. His white teacher claims that black slaves were "too lazy" to fight for their freedom. Spencer refutes this, and he is then expelled from school. When his father upholds the teacher's right, the teenage is thus thrust into a painful and difficult position.

=== Synopsis of Take a Giant Step ===
Spencer Scott, a seventeen year old black student, comes home from school and confesses to his grandmother and to the housekeeper, Christine, that he has been expelled from his almost entirely white New England high school. He explains that the teacher, Miss Bailey, claimed that Negroes of the Civil War period were "backwards" and without the assistance of Northern whites, they would never have gained freedom. Spence angrily objected and left the school. His grandmother doesn't think that was the right thing to do. Spencer's white classmates stop by his house. He complains to them that they didn't stick up for him. They let him know that he won't be invited to a Polish-American classmate's party, and they let it slip that the reason is because he is black. He angrily tells them to go away. He is upset, his grandmother tries to comfort him, and uses a derogatory term for Italians and Poles, and adds that she doesn't like them much anyway — this also makes Spencer angry. Spencer packs a bag and intends to flee his white, middle-class neighborhood.

He goes to a black neighborhood and goes into a bar. Three women named Violet, Rose and Poppy invite him to come sit with them. He then realizes they are prostitutes. Then Spencer joins a young woman named Carol. He is not behaving properly as he awkwardly talks about sex, and then asks Carol to marry him. She lets him know she's married to a man who is never at home. Carol then excuses herself and tells Spencer that she is going to go off with a seductive stranger who is at the bar. This bothers Spencer, but Carol kisses him tenderly and leaves, as she said she would. Outside, Spencer finds the three prostitutes, and Violet invites him to her room.

Back at home, Spencer's parents are upset. Spencer's father Lem threatens violence against his absent son. At the prostitute's apartment, Violet wants to kiss Spencer, but he leaves. Once back at home, Spencer's parents demand that he apologize to his teacher, but he won't. Lem tells his son that he himself is not a stranger to racism where he works. But he puts up with it. Spence argues with his parents for just accepting the injustice or racism. His grandmother joins the argument on Spencer's side; she then falls to the floor. She tells Spencer that he must respect himself, and she dies. Spencer is heartbroken and laments. Later, Christine the housekeeper tells Spencer a story about her own difficult teen years, how her husband and baby both died, and that she still has a lot she wants to live for. Spencer confesses that he wants to find love, and proposes that he and Christine might make a good couple. She is tempted. Spencer's mother has to let Christine, the housekeeper, go, because they don't need her anymore. Spencer's mother later invites his classmates over for cake.

Spencer is furious, and goes running off after Christine. He says to her "I hate being black,”. Christine talks him down. Spencer goes back home to find his parents having an awkward conversation with his classmates. Spencer then improves the situation with an announcement that because he is going to go to college in the fall, this gathering will be his farewell party. Later Spencer tells his mother that he has to learn to accept that his friendships with whites may have limits. Spencer and his mother embrace.

== Plays, screenplays, and teaching ==
Peterson went on to write scripts for TV and film. He wrote an episode of the TV series Danger, entitled "Padlocks" that starred James Dean; it aired on November 2, 1954. In 1956, he wrote Joey, which starred Anthony Perkins and Kim Stanley. He received an Emmy Award nomination for the "Joey" episode of the Goodyear Playhouse in 1957.

In addition, Peterson wrote film screenplays, and was the first African-American screenwriter in Hollywood. In the 1960s, Peterson left Hollywood for New York. Peterson's plays in the 1960s and 1970s tend to employ complex plots. His play Entertain a Ghost opened off-Broadway in 1962 at the Actors Playhouse. This was a semi-autobiographical play with a double-plot; it deals with issues of interracial relationships, focussing on a character who is a playwright and his wife, a "self-absorbed young woman determined to become an actress". In 1972, he began teaching in the theatre arts department at the State University of New York at Stony Brook. While teaching, he wrote the screenplay The Confessions of Nat Turner. His 1979 drama Crazy Horse, which was produced at the Henry Street Settlement's New Federal Theatre, deals with interracial relationships. In 1983 he wrote Another Show, which concerns an increase in suicide by adolescents.

Peterson received the Benjamin Brawley Award for Excellence in English at Morehouse College (1944). Take a Giant Step was named one of the best plays of 1953–54 by the Burns Mantle Yearbook. He was nominated for an Emmy for his script, Joey (1956). He was inducted into the Black Filmmakers Hall of Fame in 1975. Peterson retired from teaching at Stony Brook in 1993, but continued writing. He died due to lung cancer in New York City on April 27, 1998.
