= 17th Golden Globe Awards =

Film award ceremony in 1960

- Date: March 10, 1960

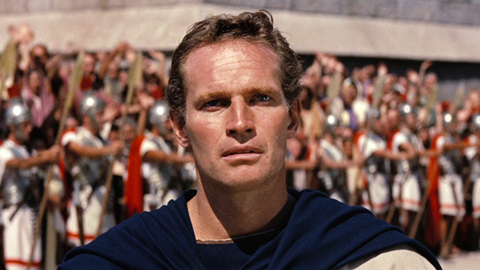
Charlton Heston appearing in the film Ben Hur

The 17th Golden Globe Awards, honoring the best in film for 1959 films, were held on March 10, 1960.

== Winners and nominees ==
=== Film ===
==== Best Film - Drama ====
Ben-Hur

- Anatomy of a Murder
- The Diary of Anne Frank
- The Nun's Story
- On the Beach

==== Best Film - Comedy ====
Some Like It Hot

- But Not For Me
- Operation Petticoat
- Pillow Talk
- Who Was That Lady?

==== Best Film - Musical ====
Porgy and Bess

- The Five Pennies
- Li'l Abner
- Say One for Me
- A Private's Affair

==== Best Actor - Drama ====
Anthony Franciosa - Career

- Richard Burton - Look Back In Anger
- Charlton Heston - Ben-Hur
- Fredric March - Middle of the Night
- Joseph Schildkraut - The Diary of Anne Frank

==== Best Actress - Drama ====
Elizabeth Taylor - Suddenly, Last Summer

- Audrey Hepburn - The Nun's Story
- Katharine Hepburn - Suddenly, Last Summer
- Lee Remick - Anatomy of a Murder
- Simone Signoret - Room at the Top

==== Best Actor - Musical or Comedy ====
Jack Lemmon - Some Like It Hot

- Clark Gable - But Not For Me
- Cary Grant - Operation Petticoat
- Dean Martin - Who Was That Lady?
- Sidney Poitier - Porgy and Bess

==== Best Actress - Musical or Comedy ====
Marilyn Monroe - Some Like It Hot

- Dorothy Dandridge - Porgy and Bess
- Doris Day - Pillow Talk
- Shirley MacLaine - Ask Any Girl
- Lilli Palmer - But Not For Me

==== Best Supporting Actor ====
Stephen Boyd - Ben-Hur

- Fred Astaire - On the Beach
- Tony Randall - Pillow Talk
- Robert Vaughn - The Young Philadelphians
- Joseph Welch - Anatomy of a Murder

==== Best Supporting Actress ====
Susan Kohner - Imitation of Life

- Edith Evans - The Nun's Story
- Estelle Hemsley - Take a Giant Step
- Juanita Moore - Imitation of Life
- Shelley Winters - The Diary of Anne Frank

==== Best Director ====
William Wyler - Ben-Hur

- Stanley Kramer - On the Beach
- Otto Preminger - Anatomy of a Murder
- George Stevens - The Diary of Anne Frank
- Fred Zinnemann - The Nun's Story

==== Best Foreign Film ====
- Black Orpheus (France)
- Odd Obsession (Japan)
- The Bridge (Germany)
- Wild Strawberries (Sweden)
- Wir Wunderkinder (Germany)

==== Best Music, Original Score ====
Ernest Gold - On the Beach

==== Best Film Promoting International Understanding ====
The Diary of Anne Frank

- The Nun's Story
- Odds Against Tomorrow
- On the Beach
- Take a Giant Step

==== Most Promising Newcomer - Male ====
Barry Coe
Troy Donahue
George Hamilton
James Shigeta

- Michael Callan

==== Most Promising Newcomer - Female ====
Angie Dickinson
Janet Munro
Stella Stevens
Tuesday Weld

- Diane Baker

==== Achievement in Television ====
Edward R. Murrow

==== Outstanding Merit ====
The Nun's Story

==== Special Award ====
Andrew Marton - Ben-Hur (For directing the chariot race)
Francis X. Bushman (For a famous silent film star)
Ramon Novarro (For a famous silent film star)

==== Special Journalistic Merit Award ====
Hedda Hopper
Louella Parsons

==== Henrietta Award (World Film Favorite) ====
Doris Day
Rock Hudson

==== Samuel Goldwyn Award ====
Room at the Top

==== Cecil B. DeMille Award ====
Bing Crosby
