= 12th Golden Globe Awards =

Film award ceremony in 1955

- Date: February 24, 1955

Highlights
- Best Picture: On The Waterfront

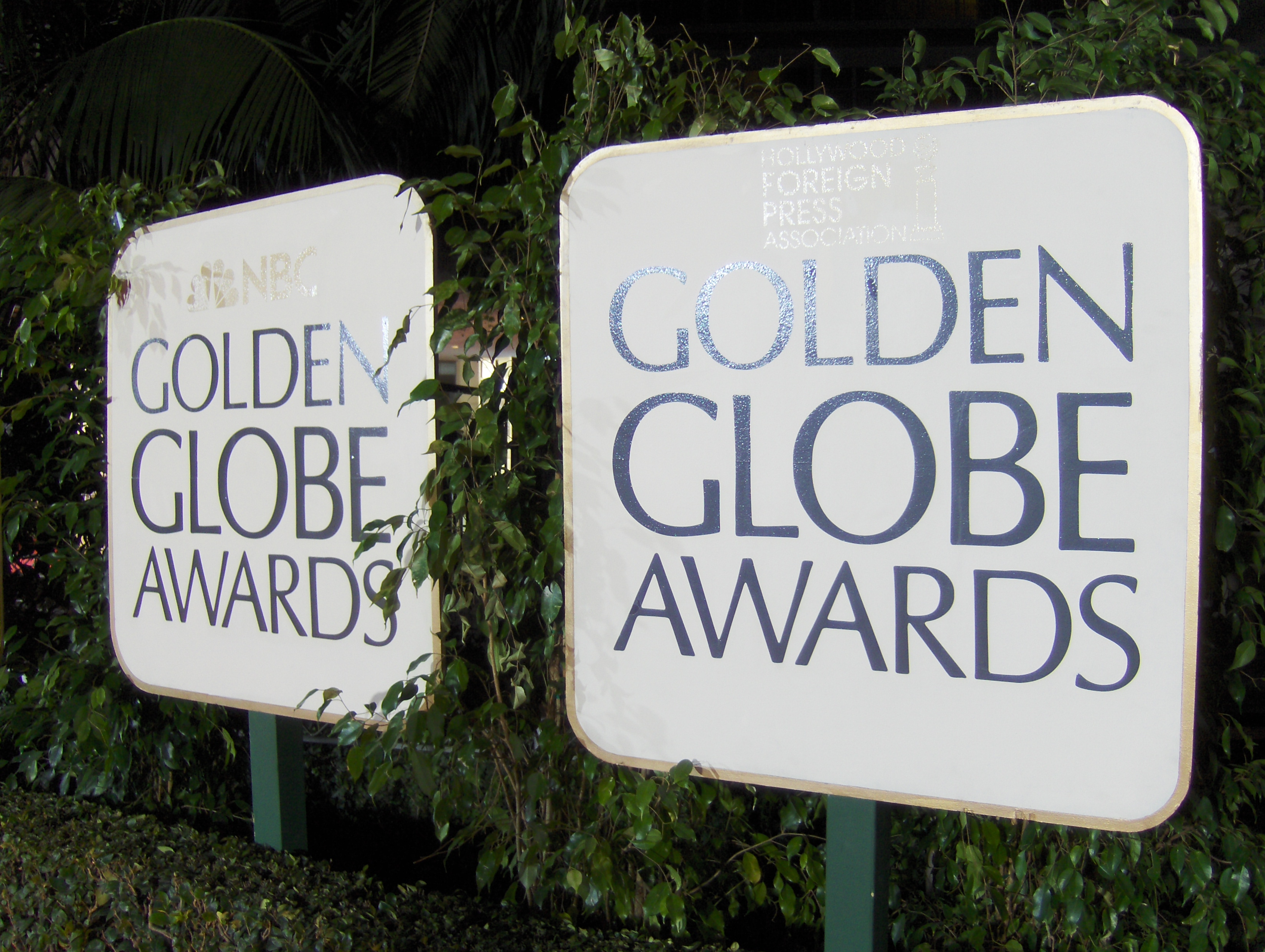
Signs for the Golden Globe Awards

The 12th Golden Globe Awards, honoring the best in film for 1954, were held on February 24, 1955, in the Cocoanut Grove at the Ambassador Hotel in Los Angeles, California.

== Winners ==
=== Best Motion Picture - Drama ===
On the Waterfront directed by Elia Kazan

=== Best Motion Picture - Comedy or Musical ===
Carmen Jones directed by Otto Preminger

=== Best Performance by an Actor in a Motion Picture - Drama ===
Marlon Brando - On the Waterfront

=== Best Performance by an Actress in a Motion Picture - Drama ===
Grace Kelly - The Country Girl

=== Best Performance by an Actor in a Motion Picture - Comedy or Musical ===
James Mason - A Star Is Born

=== Best Performance by an Actress in a Motion Picture - Comedy or Musical ===
Judy Garland - A Star Is Born

=== Best Performance by an Actor in a Supporting Role in a Motion Picture ===
Edmond O'Brien - The Barefoot Contessa

=== Best Performance by an Actress in a Supporting Role in a Motion Picture ===
Jan Sterling - The High and the Mighty

=== Best Director - Motion Picture ===
Elia Kazan - On the Waterfront

=== Best Screenplay - Motion Picture ===
Ernest Lehman - Sabrina

=== Best Foreign Language Film ===
- Genevieve from the United Kingdom
- La mujer de las camelias from Argentina
- No Way Back from West Germany
- Twenty-Four Eyes from Japan

=== Henrietta Award (World Film Favorites) ===
Gregory Peck and Audrey Hepburn

=== Cinematography - Color ===
Brigadoon photographed by Joseph Ruttenberg

=== Cinematography - Black and White ===
On the Waterfront photographed by Boris Kaufman

=== Promoting International Understanding ===
Broken Lance - directed by Edward Dmytryk

=== Cecil B. DeMille Award ===
Jean Hersholt

=== New Star of the Year Actor ===
(Three way tie)

- Carmen Jones - Joe Adams
- Four Guns to the Border - George Nader
- Seven Brides for Seven Brothers - Jeff Richards

=== New Star of the Year Actress ===
(Three way tie)

- The Trouble with Harry - Shirley MacLaine
- Phffft! - Kim Novak
- The High and the Mighty - Karen Sharpe

=== Honor Awards ===
- John Ford - Special "Pioneer" award in the motion picture industry
- Herbert Kalmus - Special "Pioneer" award for color on the screen
- Dimitri Tiomkin - for creative musical contribution to Motion Picture
