= Golden Globe Award for New Star of the Year – Actor =

Golden Globe for New Star of the Year – Actor
- Awarded for: Best New Male Star in a Motion Picture
- Location: United States
- Presented by: Hollywood Foreign Press Association
- First award: 1948
- Currently held by: Ben Kingsley for Gandhi (1982)
- Website: www.goldenglobes.com

The Golden Globe for New Star of the Year – Actor was an award given by the Hollywood Foreign Press Association at their annual Golden Globe Awards.

== History ==
The award was first introduced at the 6th Golden Globe Awards in 1948, where it was given to actor Richard Widmark for his performance in the 1947 film Kiss of Death. It was awarded as the Golden Globe Award for Most Promising Newcomer – Male until 1975. There were no awards in 1949, and between 1954 and 1965 there were multiple winners. From 1976 to 1979, the award was called Best Acting Debut in a Motion Picture – Male. From 1980 to 1983, the award was called New Star of the Year in a Motion Picture – Male. A male actor did not receive the Award in 1982. The final recipient of the award was actor Ben Kingsley for his performance as the title character in the 1982 film Gandhi. The category was discontinued following the 1983 ceremony.

== List of recipients ==
Year	Image	Recipient(s)	Film	Ref.
1947	Richard Widwark in 1973	Richard Widmark	Kiss of Death	
1948	No award			
1949	Richard Todd in 1959	Richard Todd	The Hasty Heart	
1950	No award			
1951	Kevin McCarthy in 1956	Kevin McCarthy	Death of a Salesman	
1952	Richard Burton in My Cousin Rachel	Richard Burton	My Cousin Rachel	
1953	Richard Egan in 1949	Richard Egan	The Glory Brigade and The Kid from Left Field	
1953	Steve Forrest in 1975	Steve Forrest	So Big	
1953	Hugh O'Brian in 1964	Hugh O'Brian	The Man from the Alamo	
1954	–	Joe Adams	Carmen Jones	
1954	George Nader circa 1959	George Nader	Four Guns to the Border	
1954	Jeff Richards in 1956	Jeff Richards	Seven Brides for Seven Brothers	
1955	Russ Tamblyn in Peyton Place	Russ Tamblyn	Hit the Deck	
1955	Ray Danton in 1961	Ray Danton	I'll Cry Tomorrow	
1956	Anthony Perkins in 1960	Anthony Perkins	Friendly Persuasion	
1956	Paul Newman in 1958	Paul Newman	The Silver Chalice	
1956	John Kerr in 1957	John Kerr	Tea and Sympathy	
1957	James Garner as Bret Maverick in 1959	James Garner	Sayonara	
1957	Patrick Wayne in McLintock! (1963)	Patrick Wayne	The Searchers	
1957	john Saxon in 1975	John Saxon	This Happy Feeling	
1958	John Gavin in 1964	John Gavin	A Time to Love and a Time to Die	
1958	Efrem Zimbalist Jr. in 1956	Efrem Zimbalist Jr.	Too Much, Too Soon	
1958	Bradford Dillman in 1966	Bradford Dillman	In Love and War	
1959	George Hamilton in 1969	George Hamilton	Crime and Punishment U.S.A.	
1959	James Shigeta in 1961	James Shigeta	The Crimson Kimono	
1959	Barry Coe and Jayne Mansfield	Barry Coe	A Private's Affair	
1959	Troy Donahue in 1959	Troy Donahue	A Summer Place	
1960	Michael Callan in Cat Ballou trailer (1965)	Michael Callan	Because They're Young	
1960	Brett Halsey in 2011	Brett Halsey	Desire in the Dust	
1960	Mark Damon	Mark Damon	House of Usher	
1961	Bobby Darin in 1959	Bobby Darin	Come September	
1961	Warren Beatty in 2001	Warren Beatty	Splendor in the Grass	
1962	Terence Stamp in 1973	Terence Stamp	Billy Budd	
1962	Keir Dullea in 1962	Keir Dullea	David and Lisa	
1962	Peter O'Toole as T.E. Lawrence in Lawrence of Arabia (1962)	Peter O'Toole	Lawrence of Arabia	
1962	Omar Sharif in 1963	Omar Sharif	Lawrence of Arabia	
1963	–	Stathis Giallelis	America America	
1963	Robert Walker Jr. in 1963	Robert Walker Jr.	The Ceremony	
1963	Albert Finney in 1966	Albert Finney	Tom Jones	
1964	George Segal in 1965	George Segal	The New Interns	
1964	Chaim Topol in 1971	Chaim Topol	Sallah Shabati	
1964	Harve Presnell in 1964	Harve Presnell	The Unsinkable Molly Brown	
1965	Robert Redford in 1967	Robert Redford	Inside Daisy Clover	
1966	James Farentino in 1972	James Farentino	The Pad (and How to Use It)	
1967	Dustin Hoffman in 1968	Dustin Hoffman	The Graduate	
1968	–	Leonard Whiting	Romeo and Juliet	
1969	Jon Voight in 2012	Jon Voight	Midnight Cowboy	
1970	James Earl Jones in 2013	James Earl Jones	The Great White Hope	
1971	Desi Arnaz Jr in 1974	Desi Arnaz Jr.	Red Sky at Morning	
1972	Edward Albert in 1977	Edward Albert	Butterflies Are Free	
1973	–	Paul Le Mat	American Graffiti	
1974	–	Joseph Bottoms	The Dove	
1975	Brad Dourif in 1991	Brad Dourif	One Flew Over the Cuckoo's Nest	
1976	Arnold Schwarzenegger	Arnold Schwarzenegger	Stay Hungry	
1977	No award			
1978	Brad Davis in 1980	Brad Davis	Midnight Express	
1979	Ricky Schroder in 2008	Ricky Schroder	The Champ	
1980	Timothy Hutton in 2008	Timothy Hutton	Ordinary People	
1981	No award			
1982	Sir Ben Kingsley in 2012	Ben Kingsley	Gandhi	

== See also ==
- Golden Globe Award for New Star of the Year – Actress
