= List of Asian Golden Globe winners and nominees =

This is a list of Asian nominees and winners of Golden Globe Awards, current as of the 82nd Golden Globe Awards.

== Film ==
=== Best Performance by an Actor in a Motion Picture – Drama ===
Year	Nominee	Motion Picture	Result
1965	Omar Sharif	Doctor Zhivago	Won
1982	Ben Kingsley	Gandhi (Academy Award winner)	Won
1984	F. Murray Abraham	Amadeus (Academy Award winner)	Won
2003	Ben Kingsley	House of Sand and Fog (Academy Award nominee)	Nominated
2020	Riz Ahmed	Sound of Metal (Academy Award nominee)	Nominated

=== Best Performance by an Actress in a Motion Picture – Drama ===
Year	Nominee	Motion Picture	Result
1985	Cher	Mask	Nominated
2002	Salma Hayek	Frida (Academy Award nominee)	Nominated
2005	Zhang Ziyi	Memoirs of a Geisha	Nominated
2023	Greta Lee	Past Lives	Nominated

=== Best Performance by an Actor in a Motion Picture – Musical or Comedy ===
Year	Nominee	Motion Picture	Result
1956	Yul Brynner	The King and I (Academy Award winner)	Nominated
2020	Dev Patel	The Personal History of David Copperfield	Nominated
2026	Lee Byung-hun	No Other Choice	Nominated

=== Best Performance by an Actress in a Motion Picture – Musical or Comedy ===
Year	Nominee	Motion Picture	Result
1956	Machiko Kyō	The Teahouse of the August Moon	Nominated
1961	Miyoshi Umeki	Flower Drum Song	Nominated
1987	Cher	Moonstruck (Academy Award winner)	Won
2016	Hailee Steinfeld	The Edge of Seventeen	Nominated
2018	Constance Wu	Crazy Rich Asians	Nominated
2019	Awkwafina	The Farewell	Won
2022	Michelle Yeoh	Everything Everywhere All at Once (Academy Award winner)	Won

=== Best Supporting Actor – Motion Picture ===
Year	Nominee	Motion Picture	Result
1943	Akim Tamiroff	For Whom the Bell Tolls (Academy Award nominee)	Won
1957	Sessue Hayakawa	The Bridge on the River Kwai (Academy Award nominee)	Nominated
1962	Omar Sharif	Lawrence of Arabia (Academy Award nominee)	Won
1966	Mako	The Sand Pebbles (Academy Award nominee)	Nominated
1984	Haing S Ngor	The Killing Fields (Academy Award winner)	Won
1984	Pat Morita	The Karate Kid (Academy Award nominee)	Nominated
1991	Ben Kingsley	Bugsy (Academy Award nominee)	Nominated
2001	Ben Kingsley	Sexy Beast (Academy Award nominee)	Nominated
2003	Ken Watanabe	The Last Samurai (Academy Award nominee)	Nominated
2016	Dev Patel	Lion (Academy Award nominee)	Nominated
2022	Ke Huy Quan	Everything Everywhere All at Once (Academy Award winner)	Won
2023	Charles Melton	May December	Nominated

=== Best Supporting Actress – Motion Picture ===
Year	Nominee	Motion Picture	Result
1957	Miyoshi Umeki	Sayonara (Academy Award winner)	Nominated
1962	Tarita Teriipaia	Mutiny on the Bounty	Nominated
1982	Cher	Come Back to the Five and Dime, Jimmy Dean, Jimmy Dean	Nominated
1983	Cher	Silkwood (Academy Award nominee)	Won
1985	Meg Tilly	Agnes of God (Academy Award nominee)	Won
1999	Catherine Keener	Being John Malkovich (Academy Award nominee)	Nominated
2006	Rinko Kikuchi	Babel (Academy Award nominee)	Nominated
2017	Hong Chau	Downsizing	Nominated
2022	Dolly de Leon	Triangle of Sadness	Nominated

== Television ==
=== Best Television Series – Drama ===
Year	Nominee series	Result
2022	Squid Game	Nominated
2025	Shōgun	Won

=== Best Actor in a Television Series – Drama ===
Year	Nominee	Series	Result
2022	Lee Jung-jae	Squid Game	Nominated (Emmy Award winner)
2025	Hiroyuki Sanada	Shōgun	Won (Emmy Award winner)

=== Best Actress in a Television Series – Drama ===
Year	Nominee	Series	Result
1981	Yoko Shimada	Shōgun	Won
2019	Sandra Oh	Killing Eve	Won (Emmy Award nominee)
2025	Anna Sawai	Shōgun	Won (Emmy Award winner)

=== Best Actor in a Television Series – Comedy or Musical ===
Year	Nominee	Series	Result
2017	Aziz Ansari	Master of None	Nominated
2018	Aziz Ansari	Master of None	Won

=== Best Actress in a Television Series – Comedy or Musical ===
Year	Nominee	Series	Result
1974	Cher	The Sonny & Cher Comedy Hour	Won
2005	Teri Hatcher	Desperate Housewives	Won
2006	Teri Hatcher	Desperate Housewives	Nominated

=== Best Actor – Series, Miniseries or Motion Picture Made for Television ===
Year	Nominee	Series	Result
2019	Darren Criss	The Assassination of Gianni Versace: American Crime Story	Won (Emmy Award winner)
2024	Steven Yeun	Beef	Won (Emmy Award winner)

=== Best Actress – Series, Miniseries or Motion Picture Made for Television ===
Year	Nominee	Series	Result
2024	Ali Wong	Beef	Won (Emmy Award winner)

=== Best Supporting Actor – Series, Miniseries or Motion Picture Made for Television ===
Year	Nominee	Series	Result
2022	O Yeong-su	Squid Game	Won (Emmy Award nominee)
2025	Tadanobu Asano	Shōgun	Won (Emmy Award nominee)

=== Best Supporting Actress – Series, Miniseries or Motion Picture Made for Television ===
Year	Nominee	Series	Result
2005	Sandra Oh	Grey's Anatomy	Won (Emmy Award nominee)

=== Best Performance in Stand-Up Comedy on Television ===
Year	Nominee	Series	Result
2025	Ali Wong	Ali Wong: Single Lady	Won
2026	Kumail Nanjiani	Kumail Nanjiani: Night Thoughts	Nominated

== Acting Category ==
=== Film ===
==== Men ====
Year	Actor	Award	Motion Picture	Result
1943	Akim Tamiroff	Best Supporting Actor	For Whom the Bell Tolls	Won
1956	Yul Brynner	Best Actor – Musical or Comedy	The King and I	Nominated
1957	Sessue Hayakawa	Best Supporting Actor	The Bridge on the River Kwai	Nominated
1962	Omar Sharif	Best Supporting Actor	Lawrence of Arabia	Won
1965	Omar Sharif	Best Actor – Drama	Doctor Zhivago	Won
1966	Mako	Best Supporting Actor	The Sand Pebbles	Nominated
1982	Ben Kingsley	Best Actor – Drama	Gandhi	Won
1984	F. Murray Abraham	Best Actor – Drama	Amadeus	Won
1984	Haing S Ngor	Best Supporting Actor	The Killing Fields	Won
1984	Pat Morita	Best Supporting Actor	The Karate Kid	Nominated
1991	Ben Kingsley	Best Supporting Actor	Bugsy	Nominated
2001	Ben Kingsley	Best Supporting Actor	Sexy Beast	Nominated
2003	Ben Kingsley	Best Actor – Motion Picture Drama	House of Sand and Fog	Nominated
2003	Ken Watanabe	Best Supporting Actor	The Last Samurai	Nominated
2016	Dev Patel	Best Supporting Actor	Lion	Nominated
2020	Riz Ahmed	Best Actor – Drama	Sound of Metal	Nominated
2020	Dev Patel	Best Actor – Musical or Comedy	The Personal History of David Copperfield	Nominated
2022	Ke Huy Quan	Best Supporting Actor	Everything Everywhere All at Once	Won
2023	Charles Melton	Best Supporting Actor	May December	Nominated
2026	Lee Byung-hun	Best Actor – Musical or Comedy	No Other Choice	Nominated

==== Women ====
Year	Actor	Award	Motion Picture	Result
1956	Machiko Kyō	Best Actress – Musical or Comedy	The Teahouse of the August Moon	Nominated
1957	Miyoshi Umeki	Best Supporting Actress	Sayonara	Nominated
1961	Miyoshi Umeki	Best Actress – Musical or Comedy	Flower Drum Song	Nominated
1962	Tarita Teriipaia	Best Supporting Actress	Mutiny on the Bounty	Nominated
1982	Cher	Best Supporting Actress	Come Back to the Five and Dime, Jimmy Dean, Jimmy Dean	Nominated
1983	Cher	Best Supporting Actress	Silkwood	Won
1985	Cher	Best Actress – Drama	Mask	Nominated
1985	Meg Tilly	Best Supporting Actress	Agnes of God	Won
1987	Cher	Best Actress – Musical or Comedy	Moonstruck	Won
1999	Catherine Keener	Best Supporting Actress	Being John Malkovich	Nominated
2002	Salma Hayek	Best Actress – Drama	Frida	Nominated
2005	Zhang Ziyi	Best Actress – Drama	Memoirs of a Geisha	Nominated
2006	Rinko Kikuchi	Best Supporting Actress	Babel	Nominated
2016	Hailee Steinfeld	Best Actress – Musical or Comedy	The Edge of Seventeen	Nominated
2017	Hong Chau	Best Supporting Actress	Downsizing	Nominated
2018	Constance Wu	Best Actress – Musical or Comedy	Crazy Rich Asians	Nominated
2019	Awkwafina	Best Actress – Musical or Comedy	The Farewell	Won
2022	Michelle Yeoh	Best Actress – Musical or Comedy	Everything Everywhere All at Once	Won
2022	Dolly de Leon	Best Supporting Actress	Triangle of Sadness	Nominated
2023	Greta Lee	Best Actress – Drama	Past Lives	Nominated

=== Television ===
==== Men ====
Year	Actor	Award	Series	Result
2017	Aziz Ansari	Best Actor – Musical or Comedy Series	Master of None	Nominated
2018	Aziz Ansari	Best Actor – Musical or Comedy Series	Master of None	Won
2019	Darren Criss	Best Actor – Miniseries or Television Film	The Assassination of Gianni Versace: American Crime Story	Won
2022	Lee Jung-jae	Best Actor – Drama Series	Squid Game	Nominated
2022	O Yeong-su	Best Supporting Actor – Series, Miniseries or Television Film	Squid Game	Won
2024	Steven Yeun	Best Actor – Miniseries or Television Film	Beef	Won
2025	Hiroyuki Sanada	Best Actor – Drama Series	Shōgun	Won
2025	Tadanobu Asano	Best Supporting Actor – Series, Miniseries or Television Film	Shōgun	Won
2026	Kumail Nanjiani	Best Performance in Stand-Up Comedy on Television	Kumail Nanjiani: Night Thoughts	Nominated

==== Women ====
Year	Actor	Award	Series	Result
1981	Yoko Shimada	Best Actress – Drama Series	Shōgun	Won
2005	Sandra Oh	Best Supporting Actress – Series, Miniseries or Television Film	Grey's Anatomy	Won
2019	Sandra Oh	Best Actress – Drama Series	Killing Eve	Won
2024	Ali Wong	Best Actress – Miniseries or Television Film	Beef	Won
2025	Anna Sawai	Best Actress – Drama Series	Shōgun	Won
2025	Ali Wong	Best Performance in Stand-Up Comedy on Television	Ali Wong: Single Lady	Won

== Directing Category ==
Director
Year	Nominee	Award	Motion Picture	Result
1978	Terrence Malick	Best Director – Motion Picture	Days of Heaven	Nominated
1995	Ang Lee	Best Director – Motion Picture	Sense and Sensibility	Nominated
2000	Ang Lee	Best Director – Motion Picture	Crouching Tiger, Hidden Dragon	Won
2005	Ang Lee	Best Director – Motion Picture	Brokeback Mountain	Won
2012	Ang Lee	Best Director – Motion Picture	Life of Pi	Nominated
2019	Bong Joon-Ho	Best Director – Motion Picture	Parasite	Nominated
2020	Chloé Zhao	Best Director – Motion Picture	Nomadland	Won
2022	Daniel Kwan	Best Director – Motion Picture	Everything Everywhere All at Once	Nominated
2023	Celine Song	Best Director – Motion Picture	Past Lives	Nominated
2024	Payal Kapadia	Best Director – Motion Picture	All We Imagine as Light	Nominated
2026	Chloé Zhao	Best Director – Motion Picture	Hamnet	Nominated
2026	Jafar Panahi	Best Director – Motion Picture	It Was Just an Accident	Nominated
