= Carmen Jones (film) =

1954 film by Otto Preminger

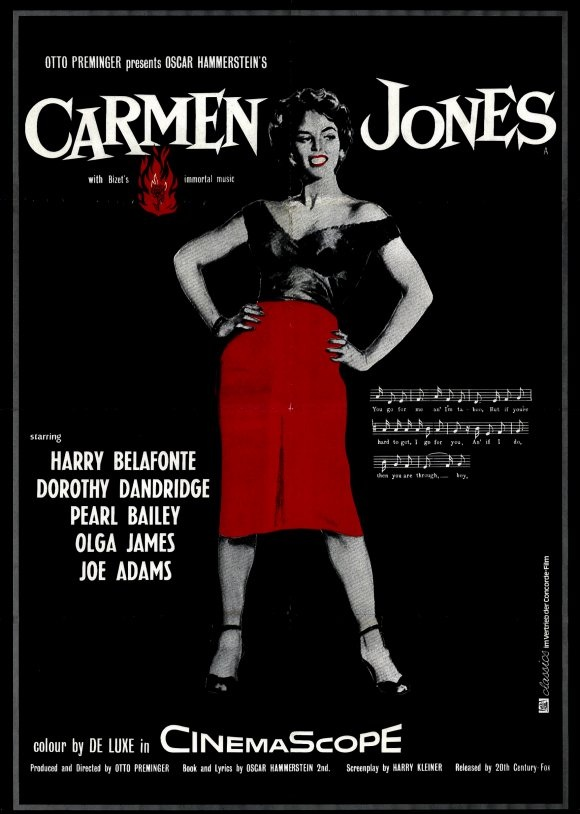
- Theatrical release poster by Saul Bass
- Directed by: Otto Preminger
- Screenplay by: Harry Kleiner
- Based on: Carmen Jones by Oscar Hammerstein II
- Produced by: Otto Preminger
- Starring: Harry Belafonte; Dorothy Dandridge; Pearl Bailey; Olga James; Joe Adams
- Cinematography: Sam Leavitt
- Edited by: Louis R. Loeffler
- Music by: Georges Bizet
- Production company: Otto Preminger Films
- Distributed by: 20th Century Fox
- Release date: October 28, 1954
- Running time: 105 minutes
- Country: United States
- Language: English
- Budget: $800,000
- Box office: $9.8 million

Carmen Jones is a 1954 American musical film featuring an African-American cast starring Harry Belafonte, Dorothy Dandridge, and Pearl Bailey and produced and directed by Otto Preminger. The screenplay by Harry Kleiner is based on the lyrics and book by Oscar Hammerstein II, from the 1943 stage musical of the same name, set to the music of Georges Bizet's 1875 opera Carmen. The opera was an adaptation of the 1845 Prosper Mérimée novella Carmen by Henri Meilhac and Ludovic Halévy.

Carmen Jones was a CinemaScope and DeLuxe Color motion picture that had begun shooting within the first 12 months of Twentieth Century Fox's venture in 1953 to the widescreen format as its main production mode. Carmen Jones was released in October 1954, exactly one year and one month after Fox's first CinemaScope venture, the Biblical epic The Robe, had opened in theatres. The film received two Academy Awards nominations, including Best Actress for Dandridge, making her the first black nominee in that category.

In 1992, Carmen Jones was selected for preservation in the United States National Film Registry by the Library of Congress as being "culturally, historically, or aesthetically significant".

== Plot ==
Set during World War II, the story focuses on Carmen Jones, a "shameless vixen" who works in a parachute factory in North Carolina. When she is arrested for fighting with a co-worker who reported her for arriving late for work, the leader of the Army guards, Sgt. Brown, assigns handsome Corporal Joe to deliver her to the civilian authorities over 50 miles away. This is much to the dismay of Joe's fiancée Cindy Lou, who had agreed to marry him during his leave prior to his reporting for flight school and an eventual officer's commission.

Joe plans to deliver his prisoner as soon as possible to return to Cindy Lou and his leave. While en route, he decides to save time by taking his jeep over a road warned unsuitable for motor vehicles that is half the distance to the town where he is taking Carmen. Carmen suggests she and Joe stop for a meal and a little romance, and his refusal intensifies her determination to seduce him. Their army jeep ends up hopelessly stuck in a river. Carmen suggests they spend the night at her grandmother's house nearby and continue their journey by train the following day, and that night Joe succumbs to Carmen's advances. The next morning, he awakens to find a note in which she says although she loves him, she is unable to deal with time in jail and is running away.

Joe is demoted to private and locked in the stockade for allowing his prisoner to escape. Cindy Lou arrives for a visit just as a rose from Carmen is delivered to him, prompting her to leave abruptly. Having found work in a Louisiana nightclub, Carmen awaits his release. One night, champion prizefighter Husky Miller enters with an entourage and introduces himself to Carmen, who expresses no interest in him. Husky orders his manager Rum Daniels to offer her jewelry, furs, and an expensive hotel suite if she and her friends Frankie and Myrt accompany him to Chicago, but she declines the offer. Just then, Joe arrives and announces he must report to flying school immediately. Angered, Carmen decides to leave with Sgt. Brown, who also has appeared on the scene, and Joe severely beats him. Realizing he will be sentenced to a long prison term for hitting his superior, Joe flees on a train to Chicago with Carmen.

Tired of being cooped up in a shabby rented room, Carmen gets dressed and leaves under the guise of buying groceries. Since he can't leave the room at all lest he be arrested, Joe questions her. Carmen becomes annoyed and tells him that she does what she wants. Carmen goes to Husky Miller's gym to ask Frankie for a loan, saying that although she has clothes, furs and diamonds, she has no actual cash. Frankie tries to convince Carmen to sit in Husky's corner so they all can be well taken care of, but Carmen is in love and refuses to double time Joe. Husky believes she is back to finally be with him, but she refuses his advances before leaving, so he tells his entire entourage that they are cut off financially until they produce Carmen (whom he nicknames Heatwave). Carmen pawns a piece of jewelry so she can buy groceries before returning to the room. When she returns not only with a bag of groceries but a new dress and shoes, Joe questions how she paid for them. Offended that he is accusing her of cheating, she argues with him and goes to Husky's hotel suite dressed in her new clothes to spend time with her friends. Frankie begins to tell fortunes by drawing cards. Carmen takes it all lightly until she draws the nine of spades. She interprets it as a premonition of her impending death and chooses to enjoy the rest of her life no matter how long it is.

Cindy Lou arrives at Husky's gym in search of Carmen since she is the only one who knows where Joe is. Frankie tells her to give up on Joe because he is nothing but trouble. An angry Joe arrives, having evaded capture and intent on getting Carmen back. Although Cindy Lou is present, he ignores her while ordering Carmen to leave with him. Husky intervenes and he is threatened by a concealed knife Joe has brought with him. Husky's people try to get him to stand down due to his fighting prowess, but can't since Joe won't stop. Joe is hit with a few blows before Carmen helps him get away. Joe asks why if she no longer loves him, but she reveals it's because she can't bear to see anyone cooped up. She tells Cindy Lou to go home and find someone worthy of her. After leaving, Cindy Lou tells herself how silly it is trying to save a man who not only doesn't love her but has left her for another woman.

Joe escapes the Military Police and attends Husky's big fight. Dressed to the nines, Carmen, her friends and Husky's entourage escort Husky to the ring. He falters in the first round, but comes back to beat his opponent in the second. Husky runs to Carmen's loving arms after winning, but they are parted after he is put up on his entourage's shoulders. Joe grabs Carmen as she is following Husky to his dressing room and pulls her into a storage room, where he begs her to return to him. Angry that she has moved on, he claims he should have killed her. In a matter-of-fact manner, she tells him that what they had is over and there is no going back for them. When Carmen continues to rebuff him and says he needs to kill her or let her go, Joe strangles her to death. A janitor finds him as he goes to alert the military police. He realizes he is now going to die for committing murder.

== Cast ==
- Dorothy Dandridge as Carmen Jones, who pursues Joe because he alone ignores her; her singing voice is dubbed by Marilyn Horne
- Harry Belafonte as Joe, a soldier selected for flight school; his singing voice is dubbed by LeVern Hutcherson
- Pearl Bailey as Frankie, one of Carmen's best friends
- Olga James as Cindy Lou, a young woman who loves Joe—and whom Joe loves until he falls in love with Carmen
- Joe Adams as "Husky" Miller, contender for heavyweight boxing champion of the world and pursuer of Carmen; his singing voice is dubbed by Marvin Hayes
- Brock Peters as Sergeant Brown, who, in his envy of golden "fly boy" Joe, tells Cindy Lou that Joe volunteered to take Carmen to jail, when in reality Brown had given him no choice. He also forces Joe into a fight, leaving him to face a 4-plus-year jail sentence or run away.
- Roy Glenn as "Rum" Daniels, Husky's manager; his singing voice is dubbed by costar Brock Peters
- Nick Stewart as "Dink" Franklin, Rum Daniels' 'manager'; his singing voice is dubbed by Joe Crawford
- Diahann Carroll as Myrtle "Myrt", another close friend of Carmen; her singing voice is dubbed by Bernice Peterson

== Production ==
The Broadway production of Carmen Jones by Billy Rose opened on December 2, 1943, and ran for 503 performances. When he saw it, Otto Preminger dismissed it as a series of "skits loosely based on the opera", with a score "simplified and changed so that the performers who had no operatic training could sing it." In adapting it for the screen, he wanted to make "a dramatic film with music rather than a conventional film musical," so he decided to return to the original source material—the Prosper Mérimée novella. He hired Harry Kleiner, whom he had taught at Yale University, to expand the story beyond the limitations imposed upon it by the Bizet opera and Hammerstein's interpretation.

Preminger realized no major studio would be interested in financing an operatic film with an all-African-American cast, so he decided to produce it independently. He anticipated United Artists executives Arthur B. Krim and Robert S. Benjamin, who had supported him in his censorship battles with The Moon Is Blue, would be willing to invest in the project, but the two felt it was not economically viable and declined. Following the completion of his previous film, River of No Return, Preminger had paid 20th Century Fox $150,000 to cancel the remainder of his contract. He was surprised when Fox head Darryl F. Zanuck contacted him and offered to finance the new film while allowing him to operate as a fully independent filmmaker. In December 1953, he accepted $750,000 and began what became a prolonged pre-production period. He hired cinematographer Sam Leavitt as director of photography, Herschel Burke Gilbert as musical director, and Herbert Ross as choreographer and began to scout locations.

On April 14, 1954, six weeks before principal photography was scheduled to begin, Preminger was contacted by Joseph Breen, who was in the final months of his leadership of the office of the Motion Picture Production Code. Breen had clashed with Preminger over The Moon Is Blue and still resented the director's success in releasing that film without a seal of approval. He cited the "over-emphasis on lustfulness" in Carmen Jones and was outraged by the screenplay's failure to include "any voice of morality properly condemning Carmen's complete lack of morals." Preminger agreed to make some minor adjustments to the script and even filmed two versions of scenes Breen found objectionable, although he included the more controversial ones in the final film.

Because he was sensitive to the issue of racial representation in the film, Preminger had no objections when Zanuck urged him to submit the script to Walter Francis White, executive secretary of the NAACP. White had no objection to it.

Theatrical poster for the film Carmen Jones

Preminger began to assemble his cast. Harry Belafonte, a folk singer who recently had introduced calypso music to a mainstream audience, had only one film to his credit. But he had just won the Tony Award and Theatre World Award for his performance in John Murray Anderson's Almanac, and Preminger cast him as Joe. Pearl Bailey's sole screen credit was the 1948 film Isn't It Romantic?, but she had achieved success as a band singer and was familiar to television audiences from her appearances on Your Show of Shows, so she was cast as Frankie. Joe Adams was a Los Angeles disc jockey with no acting experience, but Preminger felt he had the right look for Husky. Diahann Carroll auditioned for the title role, but she was so terrified of the director she could barely focus on the scene, and Preminger cast her in the small supporting role of Myrt instead. Finally, numerous African-American actresses, from Eartha Kitt to Joyce Bryant, were tested for the role of Carmen.

Preminger was familiar with Dorothy Dandridge but felt she was incapable of exuding the sultry sex appeal the role of Carmen demanded, particularly after having seen Dandridge's performance as a demure schoolteacher opposite Belafonte in Bright Road (1953). Her agent's office was in the same building where Preminger's brother Ingo worked, and he asked Ingo to intercede on his client's behalf. At his first meeting with Dandridge, Preminger told her she was "lovely" and looked like a "model" or "a beautiful butterfly," but not Carmen. He suggested she audition for the role of Cindy Lou. Dandridge took the script and left, and when she returned she was dressed and behaved exactly as Preminger envisioned Carmen. The director was impressed enough to schedule a screen test for mid-May, after Dandridge completed a singing engagement in St. Louis. In the interim he cast Juilliard School graduate Olga James as Cindy Lou.

On May 21, Preminger announced Dandridge had been cast as Carmen. Initially thrilled by the prospect of playing one of the best film roles ever offered an African-American woman, Dandridge quickly began to doubt her ability to do it justice. After several days, she told her agent to advise Preminger she was backing out of the project. The director drove to her apartment to reassure her and assuage her fears, and the two unexpectedly began a passionate affair.

Although Dandridge and Belafonte were known singers, neither sang opera. Marilyn Horne and LeVern Hutcherson were hired to record their vocals, and soundtrack recording began on June 18. Horne later recalled, "Even though I was at that time a very light lyric soprano, I did everything I possibly could to imitate the voice of Dorothy Dandridge. I spent many hours with her. In fact, one of the reasons I was chosen to do this dubbing was that I was able to imitate her voice had she been able to sing in the proper register."

Following three weeks of rehearsal, filming in CinemaScope began on June 30. Preminger had opted to remain in California for the shoot, with El Monte doubling for the Southern exteriors and the Chicago interiors being filmed at the Culver Studios. Principal photography was completed in early August, and Preminger and the Fox publicity studio began promoting both the film and its star. Dandridge was featured in Ebony and photographed for the cover of Life. She appeared on a live television broadcast on October 24, four days prior to the opening, to sing two songs from the film.

The opening title sequence is the first film title sequence created by Saul Bass, and marked the beginning of Bass's long professional relationship with Preminger. Bass also designed the film posters for the movie.

== Music ==
=== Song list ===
- "Send Them Along" – Chorus (not as version heard on Soundtrack album)
- "Lift 'Em Up an' Put 'Em Down" – Children's Chorus (not as version heard on Soundtrack Album)
- "Dat Love" ("Habanera") – Carmen
- "You Talk Jus' Like My Maw" – Joe and Cindy Lou
- "You Go For Me" – Carmen (Note: This song is the shortest reprise of "Dat's Love" in the soundtrack.)
- "Carmen Jones is Going to Jail" – Chorus
- "There's a Cafe on the Corner ("Séguedille") – Carmen
- "Dis Flower ("Flower Song") – Joe
- "Beat Out Dat Rhythm on a Drum ("Gypsy Song") – Frankie
- "Stan' Up an' Fight ("Toreador Song") – Husky Miller
- "Whizzin' Away Along de Track ("Quintet") – Carmen, Frankie, Myrt, Dink, and Rum
- "There's a Man I'm Crazy For" – Carmen, Frankie, Mert, Rum, and Dink
- "Card Song" – Carmen, Frankie, and Chorus
- "My Joe ("Micaëla's Prayer") – Cindy Lou
- "He Got His Self Another Woman" – Cindy Lou
- "Final Duet" – Carmen and Joe
- "String Me High on a Tree" – Joe

Note: After the intro of the "Gypsy Song", there is a drum solo played by a drummer named Max and as the crowd hears it, they yell: "Go, Max!" The drummer is jazz percussionist Max Roach.

=== Original soundtrack recording ===
The soundtrack recording featuring Marilyn Horne and LeVern Hutcherson was originally released on LP by RCA Victor (LM-1881). RCA reissued the album on compact disc for the first time in 1988.

== Release ==
The film had its world premiere at the Rivoli Theatre in New York City on October 28, 1954. The following February, it opened in London and Berlin, and in both cities it played for more than a year in exclusive first-run engagements. Because of a technicality in French copyright laws on order of the estate of composer Georges Bizet (who wrote the opera on which the film was based), the film was banned in France until 1981. The film was permitted to open the 1955 Cannes Film Festival, where for the first time Preminger and Dandridge openly flaunted their relationship. Soon after Cannes, Dandridge was offered the role of Tuptim in the screen adaptation of The King and I, but Preminger, acting as both lover and mentor, urged her not to accept a supporting role after proving her worth as a star. Dandridge complied but later regretted her decision, certain it had been instrumental in starting the slow but steady decline of her career.

=== Box office ===
The film earned estimated rentals in the US and Canada of $2.8 million.

=== Critical reception ===
Bosley Crowther of The New York Times called the film "a big musical shenanigan and theatrical tour-de-force" and added,

"In essence, it is a poignant story. It was in the opera of Bizet, and it is in the rich nostalgic folklore of the American Negro in the South. But here it is not so much poignant as it is lurid and lightly farcical, with the African American characters presented by Mr. Preminger as serio-comic devotees of sex ... The incongruity is pointed when these people break into song to the wholly surprising and unnatural aria airs from Bizet's opera. The tempos are alien to their spirits, the melodies are foreign to their moods, but they have at those classical numbers as though they were cutting rugs. And whatever illusions and exaltations the musical eloquence might remotely inspire are doused by the realistic settings in which Mr. Preminger has played his film ... There is nothing wrong with the music—except that it does not fit the people or the words. But that did not seem to make much difference to Mr. Hammerstein or Mr. Preminger. They were carried away by their precocity. The present consequence is a crazy mixed-up film."

Variety magazine wrote that Preminger transferred the play from stage to screen "with taste and imagination in an opulent production" and directed "with a deft touch, blending the comedy and tragedy easily and building his scenes to some suspenseful heights. He gets fine performances from the cast toppers, notably Dorothy Dandridge, a sultry Carmen whose performance maintains the right hedonistic note throughout."

The Los Angeles Tribune review was mixed: "It's as wide as all outdoors. Its color outdoes nature by several tints and tones....Possibly never has the music of George Bizet been so fulsomely treated as it is here in stereophonic sound....Technically, 'Carmen Jones' is superb. It's too bad that slightly less may be said of its content....We've grown to accept the thesis that a Hollywood musical is just that—a gay mish-mash of nothingness, strung together by an idiotic story and some song and dance numbers. But in 'Carmen Jones,' these inanities, these absurdities, become direct reflections upon Negroes. They become 'traits' because no one else is around to shoulder the blame. The all-Negro idea became especially absurd in 'Carmen Jones' during the prize-fight sequence. Here, we had a scene presumably showing several thousand spectators. And there wasn't a white person in the arena. This glared like chauvinism in reverse."

In a 2007 review in The Guardian, Andrew Pulver rated the film as three out of five stars and said, "Underneath its obvious charms—slinky Dorothy Dandridge, brawny Harry Belafonte and a handful of memorable numbers relocated from Bizet's original—the 1954 film version of Oscar Hammerstein's all-black Broadway musical now feels like a relic from the gruesome social straitjacket that was segregation; every frame, you feel, is freighted with the tension imposed by the never-appearing white folks. It was, however, laudable in its desire to showcase the talents of African-American performers who were denied opportunities in Hollywood."

TV Guide rated the film three out of four stars, calling it "intermittently successful" and "saved by a terrific cast" despite "Preminger's heavy-handed" direction.

James Baldwin, in his 1955 published essays Notes of a Native Son, addresses the movie negatively in his essay "Carmen Jones: The Dark Is Light Enough."

On the review aggregator website Rotten Tomatoes, 72% of 25 critics' reviews are positive.

=== Awards and nominations ===
Dorothy Dandridge became the first African American to be nominated for the Academy Award for Best Actress, but lost to Grace Kelly for The Country Girl.

Award	Category	Nominee(s)	Result	Ref.
Academy Awards	Best Actress	Dorothy Dandridge	Nominated	
Academy Awards	Best Scoring of a Musical Picture	Herschel Burke Gilbert	Nominated	
Berlin International Film Festival	Bronze Berlin Bear	Otto Preminger	Won	
British Academy Film Awards	Best Film from any Source		Nominated	
British Academy Film Awards	Best Foreign Actress	Dorothy Dandridge	Nominated	
Cannes Film Festival	Palme d'Or	Otto Preminger	Nominated	
Golden Globe Awards	Best Motion Picture – Musical or Comedy		Won	
Golden Globe Awards	Most Promising Newcomer – Male	Joe Adams	Won	
Locarno International Film Festival	Golden Leopard	Otto Preminger	Won	
National Film Preservation Board	National Film Registry		Inducted	
New York Film Critics Circle Awards	Best Film		Nominated	
New York Film Critics Circle Awards	Best Director	Otto Preminger	Nominated	
Writers Guild of America Awards	Best Written American Musical	Harry Kleiner	Nominated	

=== Home media ===
Fox Video released the film on VHS for the first time on November 2, 1994, in the United States. 20th Century Fox Home Entertainment released the film on DVD on January 22, 2002. It is in anamorphic widescreen format with an audio track in English and subtitles in English and Spanish.

Fox released a second DVD and a high-definition Blu-ray, both derived from a new 4K restoration, on December 3, 2013.
