= Estelle Hemsley =

American actress (1887–1968)

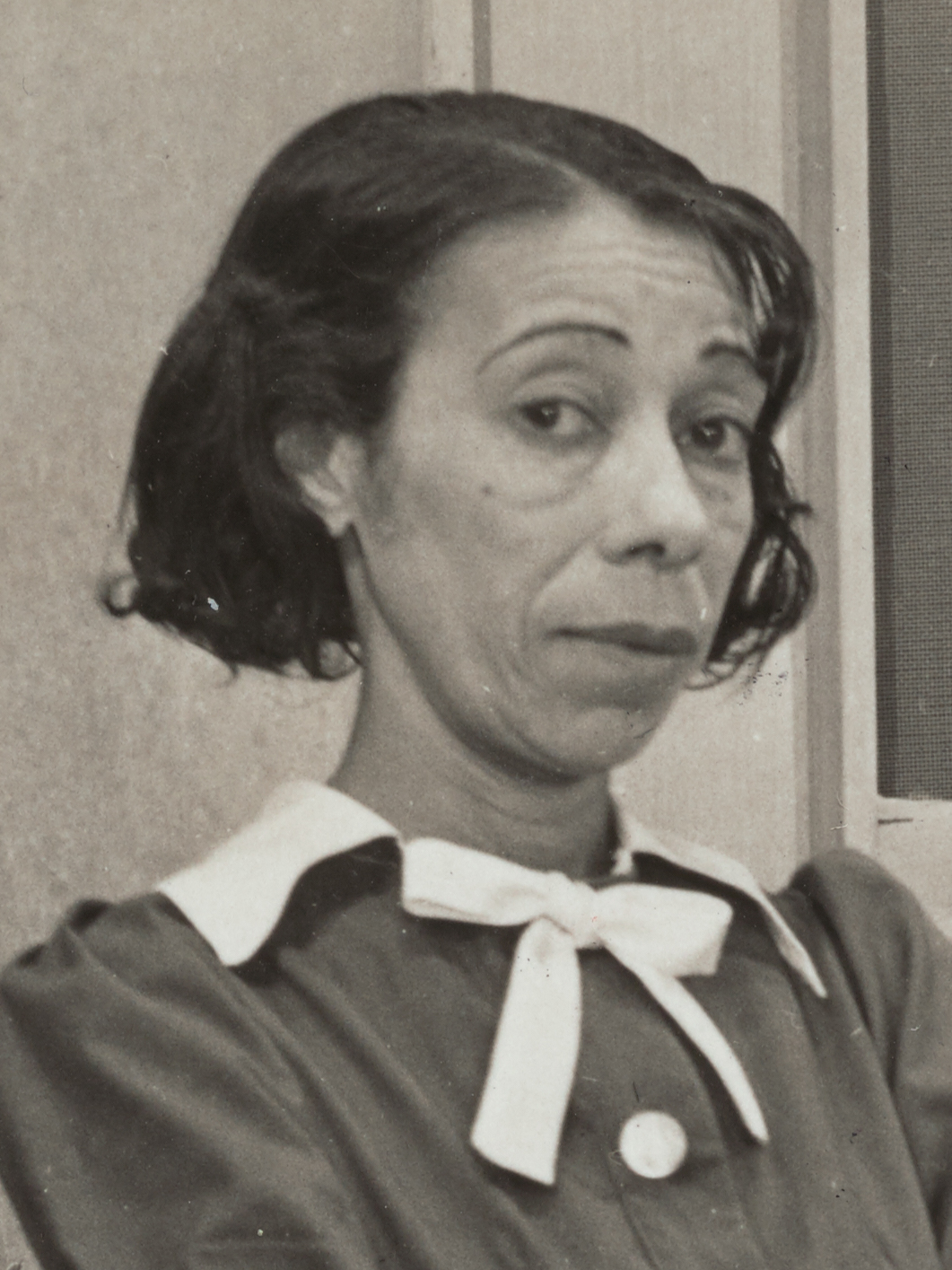
- Born: May 5, 1887
- Died: November 5, 1968 (aged 81)
- Occupation: Actress
- Years active: 1936–1966

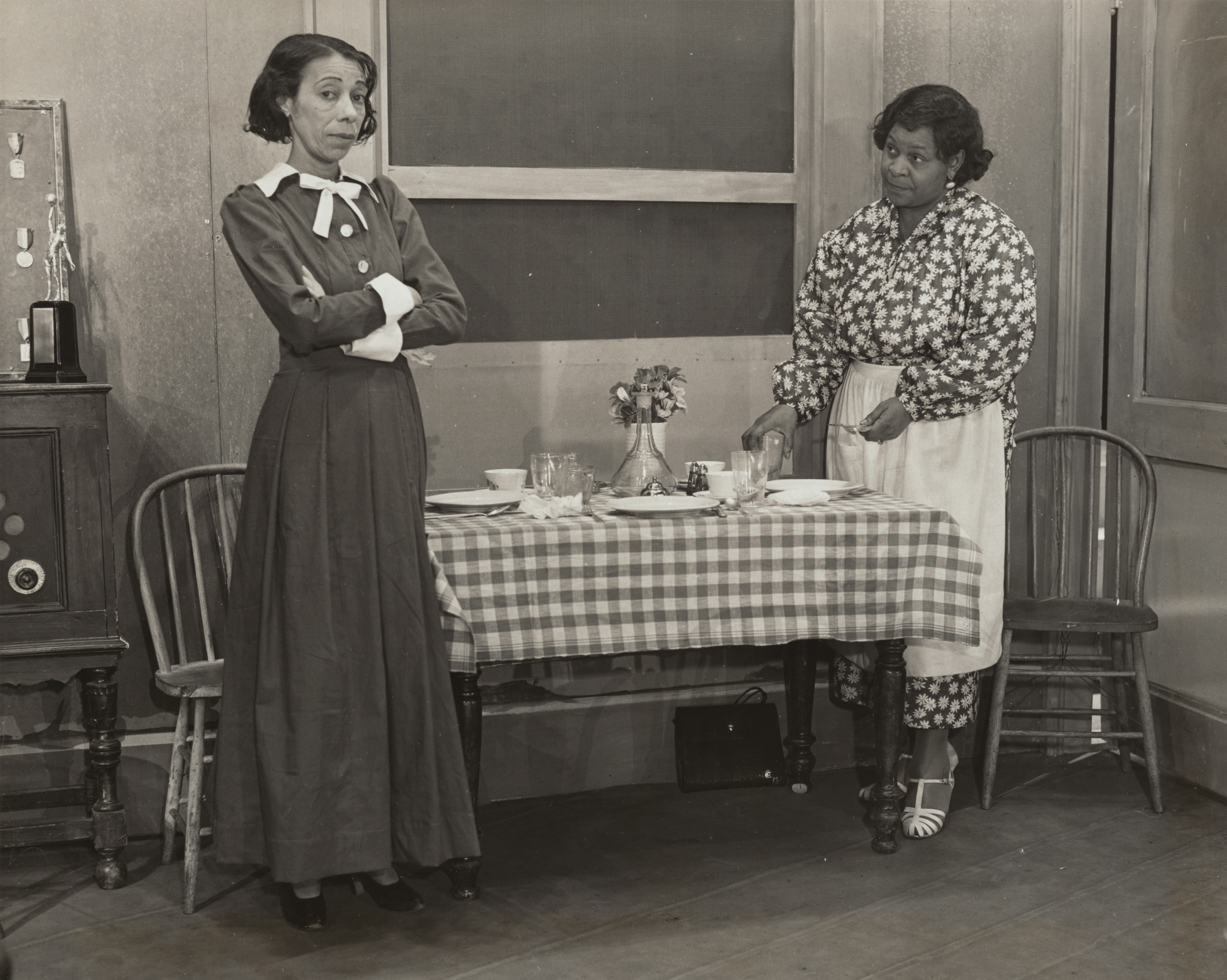
Estelle Hemsley (left) and Alberta Perkins in the Federal Theatre Project production of The Case of Philip Lawrence (1937)

Estelle Hemsley (May 5, 1887 – November 5, 1968) was a prominent African American actress of stage and screen. She appeared in the stage and screen versions of Take a Giant Step, earning a Golden Globe nomination for Best Supporting Actress in the 1959 movie directed by Philip Leacock. Her other film roles include playing Grandmother Topouzoglou in Elia Kazan's 1963 movie America, America (nominated for the Oscar for Best Picture), the role of Cla-Cla in Mel Ferrer's 1959 film Green Mansions, the mother of Ruby Dee in Edge of the City (1957), and Catherine in Robert Mulligan's 1965 movie Baby the Rain Must Fall.

== Filmography ==
Year	Title	Role	Notes
1948	The Return of Mandy's Husband	Mandy	
1957	Edge of the City	Mrs. Price	
1959	Green Mansions	Cla-Cla	
1959	Take a Giant Step	Grandma 'Gram' Martin	
1960	The Leech Woman	Old Malla	
1963	America, America	Grandmother Topouzoglou	
1965	Baby the Rain Must Fall	Catherine	
