= Joe Adams (actor) =

American actor (1924–2018)

- Born: April 11, 1924
- Died: July 3, 2018 (aged 94)
- Occupations: Actor, disc jockey, businessman

Joseph Edward Adams (April 11, 1924 – July 3, 2018), known as The Man Behind The Man, was an American actor, disc jockey, businessman and manager. He was manager to Ray Charles and won a Golden Globe — the first African-American to do so.

== Early years ==
Adams was a native of Los Angeles. His father was a Jewish businessman, and his mother was African-American.

== Career ==
After being told that, because of his race, he should not try for a career in radio, Adams took an indirect route to reach that goal. He went from being a truck driver to being chauffeur and general assistant for Los Angeles radio personality Al Jarvis. After six months, Adams had become Jarvis' assistant producer.

Adams was the first African-American announcer on NBC's radio network, handling West Coast jazz remote broadcasts and producing segments of NBC's Monitor program. In 1948, he became a disc jockey and announcer on KOWL radio in Santa Monica, California, and 10 years later he was described in a newspaper article as "the station's top personality and most valuable property".

Adams became the Emcee and stage director for the fourth Cavalcade of Jazz concert held at Wrigley Field in Los Angeles which was produced by Leon Hefflin Sr. on September 12, 1948, and continued for the annual event for 10 more years. The event showcased over 125 artists over time. Dizzy Gillespie, Frankie Lane, Little Miss Cornshucks, The Sweethearts of Rhythm, The Honey Drippers, Joe Turner, Jimmy Witherspoon, The Blenders and The Sensations were all featured as Adams emceed his first Cavalcade of Jazz concert.

On June 19, 1951, Adams began his own television program on KTTV in Los Angeles. The show featured Adams' 15-piece orchestra, vocalist Mauri Lynn, and the Hi Hatters dance team.

In 1954 Adams played boxer "Husky Miller" in the award-winning "Carmen Jones" film opera featuring an all-black cast headed by Best Actress Oscar-nominee Dorothy Dandridge.

On stage, Adams had the role of Joe Nashua in the Broadway musical Jamaica (1957).

== Personal life ==
Adams married Emma Millhouse in 1946. They remained married until his death on July 3, 2018, at the age of 94.

== Recognition ==
The Los Angeles City Council designated March 15, 1953, a day to honor Adams. In 1955, he received FEM magazine's Man of the Year Award.

== Papers ==
Adams' photographs, scrapbooks, and other materials are housed in the Joe Adams Papers collection in the Archives Center, National Museum of American History of the Smithsonian Institution.

== Filmography ==
=== Film ===
Year	Title	Role	Notes
1951	Disc Jockey	Disc Jockey	
1954	Carmen Jones	Husky Miller	
1962	The Manchurian Candidate	Psychiatrist	Uncredited
1965	Ballad in Blue	Fred	Final film role

=== Television ===
Year	Title	Role	Notes
1953	The Amos 'n Andy Show	Graduate / Bill Jackson	2 episodes; uncredited
1955	Sheena: Queen of the Jungle	Towando	Episode: "The Ganyika Kid"
1964	Channing	Nkrumah	Episode: "The Face in the Sun"
