= List of Golden Globe winners =

This is a list of Golden Globe winners in the drama program, musical/comedy program, director, and lead actor categories (both motion picture and television awards).

== List of winners ==
=== Film ===
Year	Best Picture	Best Actor	Best Actress	Director
1943–1944	The Song of Bernadette	Paul Lukas, Watch on the Rhine	Jennifer Jones, The Song of Bernadette	Henry King, The Song of Bernadette
1944–1945	Going My Way	Alexander Knox, Wilson	Ingrid Bergman, Gaslight	Leo McCarey, Going My Way
1945–1946	The Lost Weekend	Ray Milland, The Lost Weekend	Ingrid Bergman, The Bells of St. Mary's	Billy Wilder, The Lost Weekend
1946–1947	The Best Years of Our Lives	Gregory Peck, The Yearling	Rosalind Russell, Sister Kenny	Frank Capra, It's a Wonderful Life
1947–1948	Gentleman's Agreement	Ronald Colman, A Double Life	Rosalind Russell, Mourning Becomes Electra	Elia Kazan, Gentleman's Agreement
1948–1950	Johnny Belinda and The Treasure of the Sierra Madre (TIE)	Laurence Olivier, Hamlet	Jane Wyman, Johnny Belinda	John Huston, The Treasure of the Sierra Madre
1949–1950	All the King's Men	Broderick Crawford, All the King's Men	Olivia de Havilland, The Heiress	Robert Rossen, All the King's Men

Year	Drama	Musical/Comedy	Drama Actor	Musical/Comedy Actor	Drama Actress	Musical/Comedy Actress	Director
1950–1951	Sunset Boulevard	—N/a	José Ferrer, Cyrano de Bergerac	Fred Astaire, Three Little Words	Gloria Swanson, Sunset Boulevard	Judy Holliday, Born Yesterday	Billy Wilder, Sunset Boulevard
1951–1952	A Place in the Sun	An American in Paris	Fredric March, Death of a Salesman	Danny Kaye, On the Riviera	Jane Wyman, The Blue Veil	June Allyson, Too Young to Kiss	Laslo Benedek, Death of a Salesman
1952–1953	The Greatest Show on Earth	With a Song in My Heart	Gary Cooper, High Noon	Donald O'Connor, Singin' in the Rain	Shirley Booth, Come Back, Little Sheba	Susan Hayward, With a Song in My Heart	Cecil B. DeMille, The Greatest Show on Earth
1953–1954	The Robe	—N/a	Spencer Tracy, The Actress	David Niven, The Moon Is Blue	Audrey Hepburn, Roman Holiday	Ethel Merman, Call Me Madam	Fred Zinnemann, From Here to Eternity
1954–1955	On the Waterfront	Carmen Jones	Marlon Brando, On the Waterfront	James Mason, A Star Is Born	Grace Kelly, The Country Girl	Judy Garland, A Star Is Born	Elia Kazan, On the Waterfront
1955–1956	East of Eden	Guys and Dolls	Ernest Borgnine, Marty	Tom Ewell, The Seven Year Itch	Anna Magnani, The Rose Tattoo	Jean Simmons, Guys and Dolls	Joshua Logan, Picnic
1956–1957	Around the World in 80 Days	The King and I	Kirk Douglas, Lust for Life	Cantinflas, Around the World in 80 Days	Ingrid Bergman, Anastasia	Deborah Kerr, The King and I	Elia Kazan, Baby Doll
1957–1958	The Bridge on the River Kwai	Les Girls	Alec Guinness, The Bridge on the River Kwai	Frank Sinatra, Pal Joey	Joanne Woodward, The Three Faces of Eve	Taina Elg, Les Girls and Kay Kendall, Les Girls (TIE)	David Lean, The Bridge on the River Kwai
1958–1959	The Defiant Ones	Gigi; Auntie Mame	David Niven, Separate Tables	Danny Kaye, Me and the Colonel	Susan Hayward, I Want to Live!	Rosalind Russell, Auntie Mame	Vincente Minnelli, Gigi
1959–1960	Ben-Hur	Porgy and Bess; Some Like It Hot	Anthony Franciosa, Career	Jack Lemmon, Some Like It Hot	Elizabeth Taylor, Suddenly, Last Summer	Marilyn Monroe, Some Like It Hot	William Wyler, Ben-Hur
1960–1961	Spartacus	Song Without End; The Apartment	Burt Lancaster, Elmer Gantry	Jack Lemmon, The Apartment	Greer Garson, Sunrise at Campobello	Shirley MacLaine, The Apartment	Jack Cardiff, Sons and Lovers
1961–1962	The Guns of Navarone	West Side Story; A Majority of One	Maximilian Schell, Judgment at Nuremberg	Glenn Ford, Pocketful of Miracles	Geraldine Page, Summer and Smoke	Rosalind Russell, A Majority of One	Stanley Kramer, Judgment at Nuremberg
1962–1963	Lawrence of Arabia	The Music Man; That Touch of Mink	Gregory Peck, To Kill a Mockingbird	Marcello Mastroianni, Divorce Italian Style	Geraldine Page, Sweet Bird of Youth	Rosalind Russell, Gypsy	David Lean, Lawrence of Arabia
1963–1964	The Cardinal	Tom Jones	Sidney Poitier, Lilies of the Field	Alberto Sordi, The Devil	Leslie Caron, The L-Shaped Room	Shirley MacLaine, Irma la Douce	Elia Kazan, America America
1964–1965	Becket	My Fair Lady	Peter O'Toole, Becket	Rex Harrison, My Fair Lady	Anne Bancroft, The Pumpkin Eater	Julie Andrews, Mary Poppins	George Cukor, My Fair Lady
1965–1966	Doctor Zhivago	The Sound of Music	Omar Sharif, Doctor Zhivago	Lee Marvin, Cat Ballou	Samantha Eggar, The Collector	Julie Andrews, The Sound of Music	David Lean, Doctor Zhivago
1966–1967	A Man for All Seasons	The Russians Are Coming, the Russians Are Coming	Paul Scofield, A Man for All Seasons	Alan Arkin, The Russians Are Coming, the Russians Are Coming	Anouk Aimée, A Man and a Woman	Lynn Redgrave, Georgy Girl	Fred Zinnemann, A Man for All Seasons
1967–1968	In the Heat of the Night	The Graduate	Rod Steiger, In the Heat of the Night	Richard Harris, Camelot	Edith Evans, The Whisperers	Anne Bancroft, The Graduate	Mike Nichols, The Graduate
1968–1969	The Lion in Winter	Oliver!	Peter O'Toole, The Lion in Winter	Ron Moody, Oliver!	Joanne Woodward, Rachel, Rachel	Barbra Streisand, Funny Girl	Paul Newman, Rachel, Rachel
1969–1970	Anne of the Thousand Days	The Secret of Santa Vittoria	John Wayne, True Grit	Peter O'Toole, Goodbye, Mr. Chips	Geneviève Bujold, Anne of the Thousand Days	Patty Duke, Me, Natalie	Charles Jarrott, Anne of the Thousand Days
1970–1971	Love Story	M*A*S*H	George C. Scott, Patton	Albert Finney, Scrooge	Ali MacGraw, Love Story	Carrie Snodgress, Diary of a Mad Housewife	Arthur Hiller, Love Story
1971–1972	The French Connection	Fiddler on the Roof	Gene Hackman, The French Connection	Chaim Topol, Fiddler on the Roof	Jane Fonda, Klute	Twiggy, The Boy Friend	William Friedkin, The French Connection
1972–1973	The Godfather	Cabaret	Marlon Brando, The Godfather	Jack Lemmon, Avanti!	Liv Ullmann, The Emigrants	Liza Minnelli, Cabaret	Francis Ford Coppola, The Godfather
1973–1974	The Exorcist	American Graffiti	Al Pacino, Serpico	George Segal, A Touch of Class	Marsha Mason, Cinderella Liberty	Glenda Jackson, A Touch of Class	William Friedkin, The Exorcist
1974–1975	Chinatown	The Longest Yard	Jack Nicholson, Chinatown	Art Carney, Harry and Tonto	Gena Rowlands, A Woman Under the Influence	Raquel Welch, The Three Musketeers	Roman Polanski, Chinatown
1975–1976	One Flew Over the Cuckoo's Nest	The Sunshine Boys	Jack Nicholson, One Flew Over the Cuckoo's Nest	George Burns, The Sunshine Boys and Walter Matthau, The Sunshine Boys (TIE)	Louise Fletcher, One Flew Over the Cuckoo's Nest	Ann-Margret, Tommy	Miloš Forman, One Flew Over the Cuckoo's Nest
1976–1977	Rocky	A Star Is Born	Peter Finch, Network	Kris Kristofferson, A Star Is Born	Faye Dunaway, Network	Barbra Streisand, A Star Is Born	Sidney Lumet, Network
1977–1978	The Turning Point	The Goodbye Girl	Richard Burton, Equus	Richard Dreyfuss, The Goodbye Girl	Jane Fonda, Julia	Diane Keaton, Annie Hall and Marsha Mason, The Goodbye Girl (TIE)	Herbert Ross, The Turning Point
1978–1979	Midnight Express	Heaven Can Wait	Jon Voight, Coming Home	Warren Beatty, Heaven Can Wait	Jane Fonda, Coming Home	Ellen Burstyn, Same Time, Next Year and Maggie Smith, California Suite (TIE)	Michael Cimino, The Deer Hunter
1979–1980	Kramer vs. Kramer	Breaking Away	Dustin Hoffman, Kramer vs. Kramer	Peter Sellers, Being There	Sally Field, Norma Rae	Bette Midler, The Rose	Francis Ford Coppola, Apocalypse Now
1980–1981	Ordinary People	Coal Miner's Daughter	Robert De Niro, Raging Bull	Ray Sharkey, The Idolmaker	Mary Tyler Moore, Ordinary People	Sissy Spacek, Coal Miner's Daughter	Robert Redford, Ordinary People
1981–1982	On Golden Pond	Arthur	Henry Fonda, On Golden Pond	Dudley Moore, Arthur	Meryl Streep, The French Lieutenant's Woman	Bernadette Peters, Pennies from Heaven	Warren Beatty, Reds
1982–1983	E.T. the Extra-Terrestrial	Tootsie	Ben Kingsley, Gandhi	Dustin Hoffman, Tootsie	Meryl Streep, Sophie's Choice	Julie Andrews, Victor Victoria	Richard Attenborough, Gandhi
1983–1984	Terms of Endearment	Yentl	Tom Courtenay, The Dresser and Robert Duvall, Tender Mercies (TIE)	Michael Caine, Educating Rita	Shirley MacLaine, Terms of Endearment	Julie Walters, Educating Rita	Barbra Streisand, Yentl
1984–1985	Amadeus	Romancing the Stone	F. Murray Abraham, Amadeus	Dudley Moore, Micki & Maude	Sally Field, Places in the Heart	Kathleen Turner, Romancing the Stone	Miloš Forman, Amadeus
1985–1986	Out of Africa	Prizzi's Honor	Jon Voight, Runaway Train	Jack Nicholson, Prizzi's Honor	Whoopi Goldberg, The Color Purple	Kathleen Turner, Prizzi's Honor	John Huston, Prizzi's Honor
1986–1987	Platoon	Hannah and Her Sisters	Bob Hoskins, Mona Lisa	Paul Hogan, "Crocodile" Dundee	Marlee Matlin, Children of a Lesser God	Sissy Spacek, Crimes of the Heart	Oliver Stone, Platoon
1987–1988	The Last Emperor	Hope and Glory	Michael Douglas, Wall Street	Robin Williams, Good Morning, Vietnam	Sally Kirkland, Anna	Cher, Moonstruck	Bernardo Bertolucci, The Last Emperor
1988–1989	Rain Man	Working Girl	Dustin Hoffman, Rain Man	Tom Hanks, Big	Jodie Foster, The Accused, Shirley MacLaine, Madame Sousatzka and Sigourney Weaver, Gorillas in the Mist (TIE)	Melanie Griffith, Working Girl	Clint Eastwood, Bird
1989–1990	Born on the Fourth of July	Driving Miss Daisy	Tom Cruise, Born on the Fourth of July	Morgan Freeman, Driving Miss Daisy	Michelle Pfeiffer, The Fabulous Baker Boys	Jessica Tandy, Driving Miss Daisy	Oliver Stone, Born on the Fourth of July
1990–1991	Dances with Wolves	Green Card	Jeremy Irons, Reversal of Fortune	Gérard Depardieu, Green Card	Kathy Bates, Misery	Julia Roberts, Pretty Woman	Kevin Costner, Dances with Wolves
1991–1992	Bugsy	Beauty and the Beast	Nick Nolte, The Prince of Tides	Robin Williams, The Fisher King	Jodie Foster, The Silence of the Lambs	Bette Midler, For the Boys	Oliver Stone, JFK
1992–1993	Scent of a Woman	The Player	Al Pacino, Scent of a Woman	Tim Robbins, The Player	Emma Thompson, Howards End	Miranda Richardson, Enchanted April	Clint Eastwood, Unforgiven
1993–1994	Schindler's List	Mrs. Doubtfire	Tom Hanks, Philadelphia	Robin Williams, Mrs. Doubtfire	Holly Hunter, The Piano	Angela Bassett, What's Love Got to Do with It	Steven Spielberg, Schindler's List
1994–1995	Forrest Gump	The Lion King	Tom Hanks, Forrest Gump	Hugh Grant, Four Weddings and a Funeral	Jessica Lange, Blue Sky	Jamie Lee Curtis, True Lies	Robert Zemeckis, Forrest Gump
1995–1996	Sense and Sensibility	Babe	Nicolas Cage, Leaving Las Vegas	John Travolta, Get Shorty	Sharon Stone, Casino	Nicole Kidman, To Die For	Mel Gibson, Braveheart
1996–1997	The English Patient	Evita	Geoffrey Rush, Shine	Tom Cruise, Jerry Maguire	Brenda Blethyn, Secrets & Lies	Madonna, Evita	Miloš Forman, The People vs. Larry Flynt
1997–1998	Titanic	As Good as It Gets	Peter Fonda, Ulee's Gold	Jack Nicholson, As Good as It Gets	Judi Dench, Mrs Brown	Helen Hunt, As Good as It Gets	James Cameron, Titanic
1998–1999	Saving Private Ryan	Shakespeare in Love	Jim Carrey, The Truman Show	Michael Caine, Little Voice	Cate Blanchett, Elizabeth	Gwyneth Paltrow, Shakespeare in Love	Steven Spielberg, Saving Private Ryan
1999–2000	American Beauty	Toy Story 2	Denzel Washington, The Hurricane	Jim Carrey, Man on the Moon	Hilary Swank, Boys Don't Cry	Janet McTeer, Tumbleweeds	Sam Mendes, American Beauty
2000–2001	Gladiator	Almost Famous	Tom Hanks, Cast Away	George Clooney, O Brother, Where Art Thou?	Julia Roberts, Erin Brockovich	Renée Zellweger, Nurse Betty	Ang Lee, Crouching Tiger, Hidden Dragon
2001–2002	A Beautiful Mind	Moulin Rouge!	Russell Crowe, A Beautiful Mind	Gene Hackman, The Royal Tenenbaums	Sissy Spacek, In the Bedroom	Nicole Kidman, Moulin Rouge!	Robert Altman, Gosford Park
2002–2003	The Hours	Chicago	Jack Nicholson, About Schmidt	Richard Gere, Chicago	Nicole Kidman, The Hours	Renée Zellweger, Chicago	Martin Scorsese, Gangs of New York
2003–2004	The Lord of the Rings: The Return of the King	Lost in Translation	Sean Penn, Mystic River	Bill Murray, Lost in Translation	Charlize Theron, Monster	Diane Keaton, Something's Gotta Give	Peter Jackson, The Lord of the Rings: The Return of the King
2004–2005	The Aviator	Sideways	Leonardo DiCaprio, The Aviator	Jamie Foxx, Ray	Hilary Swank, Million Dollar Baby	Annette Bening, Being Julia	Clint Eastwood, Million Dollar Baby
2005–2006	Brokeback Mountain	Walk the Line	Philip Seymour Hoffman, Capote	Joaquin Phoenix, Walk the Line	Felicity Huffman, Transamerica	Reese Witherspoon, Walk the Line	Ang Lee, Brokeback Mountain
2006–2007	Babel	Cars	Forest Whitaker, The Last King of Scotland	Sacha Baron Cohen, Borat	Helen Mirren, The Queen	Meryl Streep, The Devil Wears Prada	Martin Scorsese, The Departed
2007–2008	Atonement	Sweeney Todd: The Demon Barber of Fleet Street	Daniel Day-Lewis, There Will Be Blood	Johnny Depp, Sweeney Todd: The Demon Barber of Fleet Street	Julie Christie, Away from Her	Marion Cotillard, La Vie en Rose	Julian Schnabel, The Diving Bell and the Butterfly
2008–2009	Slumdog Millionaire	Vicky Cristina Barcelona	Mickey Rourke, The Wrestler	Colin Farrell, In Bruges	Kate Winslet, Revolutionary Road	Sally Hawkins, Happy-Go-Lucky	Danny Boyle, Slumdog Millionaire
2009–2010	Avatar	The Hangover	Jeff Bridges, Crazy Heart	Robert Downey Jr., Sherlock Holmes	Sandra Bullock, The Blind Side	Meryl Streep, Julie & Julia	James Cameron, Avatar
2010–2011	The Social Network	The Kids Are All Right	Colin Firth, The King's Speech	Paul Giamatti, Barney's Version	Natalie Portman, Black Swan	Annette Bening, The Kids Are All Right	David Fincher, The Social Network
2011–2012	The Descendants	The Artist	George Clooney, The Descendants	Jean Dujardin, The Artist	Meryl Streep, The Iron Lady	Michelle Williams, My Week with Marilyn	Martin Scorsese, Hugo
2012–2013	Argo	Les Misérables	Daniel Day-Lewis, Lincoln	Hugh Jackman, Les Misérables	Jessica Chastain, Zero Dark Thirty	Jennifer Lawrence, Silver Linings Playbook	Ben Affleck, Argo
2013–2014	12 Years a Slave	American Hustle	Matthew McConaughey, Dallas Buyers Club	Leonardo DiCaprio, The Wolf of Wall Street	Cate Blanchett, Blue Jasmine	Amy Adams, American Hustle	Alfonso Cuarón, Gravity
2014–2015	Boyhood	The Grand Budapest Hotel	Eddie Redmayne, The Theory of Everything	Michael Keaton, Birdman	Julianne Moore, Still Alice	Amy Adams, Big Eyes	Richard Linklater, Boyhood
2015–2016	The Revenant	The Martian	Leonardo DiCaprio, The Revenant	Matt Damon, The Martian	Brie Larson, Room	Jennifer Lawrence, Joy	Alejandro G. Iñárritu, The Revenant
2016–2017	Moonlight	La La Land	Casey Affleck, Manchester by the Sea	Ryan Gosling, La La Land	Isabelle Huppert, Elle	Emma Stone, La La Land	Damien Chazelle, La La Land
2017–2018	Three Billboards Outside Ebbing, Missouri	Lady Bird	Gary Oldman, Darkest Hour	James Franco, The Disaster Artist	Frances McDormand, Three Billboards Outside Ebbing, Missouri	Saoirse Ronan, Lady Bird	Guillermo del Toro, The Shape of Water
2018–2019	Bohemian Rhapsody	Green Book	Rami Malek, Bohemian Rhapsody	Christian Bale, Vice	Glenn Close, The Wife	Olivia Colman, The Favourite	Alfonso Cuarón, Roma
2019–2020	1917	Once Upon a Time in Hollywood	Joaquin Phoenix, Joker	Taron Egerton, Rocketman	Renée Zellweger, Judy	Awkwafina, The Farewell	Sam Mendes, 1917
2020–2021	Nomadland	Borat Subsequent Moviefilm	Chadwick Boseman, Ma Rainey's Black Bottom	Sacha Baron Cohen, Borat Subsequent Moviefilm	Andra Day, The United States vs. Billie Holiday	Rosamund Pike, I Care a Lot	Chloé Zhao, Nomadland
2021–2022	The Power of the Dog	West Side Story	Will Smith, King Richard	Andrew Garfield, Tick, Tick... Boom!	Nicole Kidman, Being the Ricardos	Rachel Zegler, West Side Story	Jane Campion, The Power of the Dog
2022–2023	The Fabelmans	The Banshees of Inisherin	Austin Butler, Elvis	Colin Farrell, The Banshees of Inisherin	Cate Blanchett, Tár	Michelle Yeoh, Everything Everywhere All at Once	Steven Spielberg, The Fabelmans
2023–2024	Oppenheimer	Poor Things	Cillian Murphy, Oppenheimer	Paul Giamatti, The Holdovers	Lily Gladstone, Killers of the Flower Moon	Emma Stone, Poor Things	Christopher Nolan, Oppenheimer
2024–2025	The Brutalist	Emilia Pérez	Adrien Brody, The Brutalist	Sebastian Stan, A Different Man	Fernanda Torres, I'm Still Here	Demi Moore, The Substance	Brady Corbet, The Brutalist
2025–2026	Hamnet	One Battle After Another	Wagner Moura, The Secret Agent	Timothée Chalamet, Marty Supreme	Jessie Buckley, Hamnet	Rose Byrne, If I Had Legs I'd Kick You	Paul Thomas Anderson, One Battle After Another

=== Television ===
Year	Drama	Musical/Comedy	Drama Actor	Musical/Comedy Actor	Drama Actress	Musical/Comedy Actress
1990–1991	Twin Peaks	Cheers	Kyle MacLachlan, Twin Peaks	Ted Danson, Cheers	Patricia Wettig, Thirtysomething; Sharon Gless, The Trials of Rosie O'Neill	Kirstie Alley, Cheers
1991–1992	Northern Exposure	Brooklyn Bridge	Scott Bakula, Quantum Leap	Burt Reynolds, Evening Shade	Angela Lansbury, Murder, She Wrote	Candice Bergen, Murphy Brown
1992–1993	Northern Exposure	Roseanne	Sam Waterston, I'll Fly Away	John Goodman, Roseanne	Regina Taylor, I'll Fly Away	Roseanne Barr, Roseanne
1993–1994	NYPD Blue	Seinfeld	David Caruso, NYPD Blue	Jerry Seinfeld, Seinfeld	Kathy Baker, Picket Fences	Helen Hunt, Mad About You
1994–1995	The X-Files	Mad About You	Dennis Franz, NYPD Blue	Tim Allen, Home Improvement	Claire Danes, My So-Called Life	Helen Hunt, Mad About You
1995–1996	Party of Five	Cybill	Jimmy Smits, NYPD Blue	Kelsey Grammer, Frasier	Jane Seymour, Dr. Quinn, Medicine Woman	Cybill Shepherd, Cybill
1996–1997	The X-Files	3rd Rock from the Sun	David Duchovny, The X-Files	John Lithgow, 3rd Rock from the Sun	Gillian Anderson, The X-Files	Helen Hunt, Mad About You
1997–1998	The X-Files	Ally McBeal	Anthony Edwards, ER	Michael J. Fox, Spin City	Christine Lahti, Chicago Hope	Calista Flockhart, Ally McBeal
1998–1999	The Practice	Ally McBeal	Dylan McDermott, The Practice	Michael J. Fox, Spin City	Keri Russell, Felicity	Jenna Elfman, Dharma & Greg
1999–2000	The Sopranos	Sex and the City	James Gandolfini, The Sopranos	Michael J. Fox, Spin City	Edie Falco, The Sopranos	Sarah Jessica Parker, Sex and the City
2000–2001	The West Wing	Sex and the City	Martin Sheen, The West Wing	Kelsey Grammer, Frasier	Sela Ward, Once and Again	Sarah Jessica Parker, Sex and the City
2001–2002	Six Feet Under	Sex and the City	Kiefer Sutherland, 24	Charlie Sheen, Spin City	Jennifer Garner, Alias	Sarah Jessica Parker, Sex and the City
2002–2003	The Shield	Curb Your Enthusiasm	Michael Chiklis, The Shield	Tony Shalhoub, Monk	Edie Falco, The Sopranos	Jennifer Aniston, Friends
2003–2004	24	The Office	Anthony LaPaglia, Without a Trace	Ricky Gervais, The Office	Frances Conroy, Six Feet Under	Sarah Jessica Parker, Sex and the City
2004–2005	Nip/Tuck	Desperate Housewives	Ian McShane, Deadwood	Jason Bateman, Arrested Development	Mariska Hargitay, Law & Order: Special Victims Unit	Teri Hatcher, Desperate Housewives
2005–2006	Lost	Desperate Housewives	Hugh Laurie, House, M.D.	Steve Carell, The Office	Geena Davis, Commander in Chief	Mary-Louise Parker, Weeds
2006–2007	Grey's Anatomy	Ugly Betty	Hugh Laurie, House, M.D.	Alec Baldwin, 30 Rock	Kyra Sedgwick, The Closer	America Ferrera, Ugly Betty
2007–2008	Mad Men	Extras	Jon Hamm, Mad Men	David Duchovny, Californication	Glenn Close, Damages	Tina Fey, 30 Rock
2008–2009	Mad Men	30 Rock	Gabriel Byrne, In Treatment	Alec Baldwin, 30 Rock	Anna Paquin, True Blood	Tina Fey, 30 Rock
2009–2010	Mad Men	Glee	Michael C. Hall, Dexter	Alec Baldwin, 30 Rock	Julianna Margulies, The Good Wife	Toni Collette, United States of Tara
2010–2011	Boardwalk Empire	Glee	Steve Buscemi, Boardwalk Empire	Jim Parsons, The Big Bang Theory	Katey Sagal, Sons of Anarchy	Laura Linney, The Big C
2011–2012	Homeland	Modern Family	Kelsey Grammer, Boss	Matt LeBlanc, Episodes	Claire Danes, Homeland	Laura Dern, Enlightened
2012–2013	Homeland	Girls	Damian Lewis, Homeland	Don Cheadle, House of Lies	Claire Danes, Homeland	Lena Dunham, Girls
2013–2014	Breaking Bad	Brooklyn Nine-Nine	Bryan Cranston, Breaking Bad	Andy Samberg, Brooklyn Nine-Nine	Robin Wright, House of Cards	Amy Poehler, Parks and Recreation
2014–2015	The Affair	Transparent	Kevin Spacey, House of Cards	Jeffrey Tambor, Transparent	Ruth Wilson, The Affair	Gina Rodriguez, Jane the Virgin
2015–2016	Mr. Robot	Mozart in the Jungle	Jon Hamm, Mad Men	Gael García Bernal, Mozart in the Jungle	Taraji Henson, Empire	Rachel Bloom, Crazy Ex-Girlfriend
2016–2017	The Crown	Atlanta	Billy Bob Thornton, Goliath	Donald Glover, Atlanta	Claire Foy, The Crown	Tracee Ellis Ross, Black-ish
2017–2018	The Handmaid's Tale	The Marvelous Mrs. Maisel	Sterling K. Brown, This Is Us	Aziz Ansari, Master of None	Elisabeth Moss, The Handmaid's Tale	Rachel Brosnahan, The Marvelous Mrs. Maisel
2018–2019	The Americans	The Kominsky Method	Richard Madden, Bodyguard	Michael Douglas, The Kominsky Method	Sandra Oh, Killing Eve	Rachel Brosnahan, The Marvelous Mrs. Maisel
2019–2020	Succession	Fleabag	Brian Cox, Succession	Ramy Youssef, Ramy	Olivia Colman, The Crown	Phoebe Waller-Bridge, Fleabag
2020–2021	The Crown	Schitt's Creek	Josh O'Connor, The Crown	Jason Sudeikis, Ted Lasso	Emma Corrin, The Crown	Catherine O'Hara, Schitt's Creek
2021–2022	Succession	Hacks	Jeremy Strong, Succession	Jason Sudeikis, Ted Lasso	Mj Rodriguez, Pose	Jean Smart, Hacks
2022–2023	House of the Dragon	Abbott Elementary	Kevin Costner, Yellowstone	Jeremy Allen White, The Bear	Zendaya, Euphoria	Quinta Brunson, Abbott Elementary
2023–2024	Succession	The Bear	Kieran Culkin, Succession	Jeremy Allen White, The Bear	Sarah Snook, Succession	Ayo Edebiri, The Bear
2024–2025	Shōgun	Hacks	Hiroyuki Sanada, Shōgun	Jeremy Allen White, The Bear	Anna Sawai, Shōgun	Jean Smart, Hacks
2025–2026	The Pitt	Hacks	Noah Wyle, The Pitt	Seth Rogen, The Studio	Rhea Seehorn, Pluribus	Jean Smart, Hacks

== See also ==
- List of Golden Globe Award winning films
- List of black Golden Globe Award winners and nominees
