= Eichwald =

Eichwald may refer to:

- Eichwald (surname)
- part of the city of Kassel, Germany
- part of the village of Schönborn, Germany
- a fictitious village which is the setting of The White Ribbon.

== See also ==
- Chalampé, Alsace, France (German: Eichwald)
- Dubí, Czech Republic (formerly Eichwald, Bohemia)
- Eichwalde
