= List of Golden Globe Award winning films =

This is an (incomplete) list of films that won one or more Golden Globe Awards.

== 0–9 ==
- 12 Years a Slave (2013)
- 1917 (2019)

== A ==
- About Schmidt (2002)
- The Accused (1988)
- The Actress (1953)
- Adaptation. (2002)
- The Adventures of Tintin: The Secret of the Unicorn (2011)
- The Age of Innocence (1993)
- Agnes of God (1985)
- Airport (1970)
- Aladdin (1992)
- The Alamo (1960)
- Alfie (2004)
- All the King's Men (1949)
- Almost Famous (2000)
- Amadeus (1984)
- American Beauty (1999)
- American Graffiti (1973)
- American Hustle (2013)
- An American in Paris (1951)
- America, America (1963)
- Anastasia (1956)
- Anatomy of a Fall (2023)
- Anna (1987)
- Anne of the Thousand Days (1969)
- Annie Hall (1977)
- The Apartment (1960)
- Apocalypse Now (1979)
- Argentina, 1985 (2022)
- Argo (2012)
- Around the World in Eighty Days (1956)
- Arthur (1981)
- The Artist (2011)
- The Assault (a.k.a. De Aanslag, 1986)
- As Good as It Gets (1997)
- Atonement (2007)
- Auntie Mame (1958)
- Avanti! (1972)
- Avatar (2009)
- The Aviator (2004)
- Away from Her (2007)

== B ==
- Babel (2006)
- Babe (1995)
- Baby Doll (1956)
- Babylon (2022)
- Barbie (2023)
- The Bad Seed (1956)
- The Banshees of Inisherin (2022)
- The Barefoot Contessa (1954)
- Barney's Version (2010)
- Battleground (1949)
- A Beautiful Mind (2001)
- Beauty and the Beast (1991)
- Becket (1964)
- Beginners (2011)
- Being Julia (2004)
- Being the Ricardos (2021)
- Being There (1979)
- Belfast (2021)
- The Bells of St. Mary's (1945)
- Ben-Hur (1959)
- The Best Years of Our Lives (1946)
- The Big Country (1958)
- Big (1988)
- Bird (1988)
- Black Panther: Wakanda Forever (2022)
- Black Swan (2010)
- The Blind Side (2009)
- Blue Jasmine (2013)
- Blue Sky (1994)
- The Blue Veil (1951)
- Bohemian Rhapsody (2018)
- Boogie Nights (1997)
- Borat (2006)
- Borat Subsequent Moviefilm (2020)
- Born on the Fourth of July (1989)
- Born Yesterday (1950)
- The Boy and the Heron (2023)
- The Boy Friend (1971)
- Boys Don't Cry (1999)
- Braveheart (1995)
- Breaking Away (1979)
- The Bridge on the River Kwai (1957)
- Brokeback Mountain (2005)
- The Brutalist (2024)
- Bugsy (1991)
- Bullets over Broadway (1994)
- Burlesque (2010)
- Buster (1988)
- Butch Cassidy and the Sundance Kid (1969)

== C ==
- Cabaret (1972)
- Cactus Flower (1969)
- California Suite (1978)
- Call Me Madam (1953)
- Camelot (1967)
- Capote (2005)
- The Cardinal (1963)
- Carmen Jones (1954)
- Carnal Knowledge (1971)
- Career (1959)
- Casino (1995)
- Cast Away (2000)
- Cat Ballou (1965)
- Challengers (2024)
- Charly (1968)
- Chicago (2002)
- Children of a Lesser God (1986)
- Chinatown (1974)
- Cinderella Liberty (1973)
- City Slickers (1991)
- Closer (2004)
- Coal Miner's Daughter (1980)
- Cold Mountain (2003)
- The Collector (1965)
- The Color Purple (1985)
- Come Back, Little Sheba (1952)
- Coming Home (1978)
- Conclave (2024)
- The Constant Gardener (2005)
- The Country Girl (1954)
- Crazy Heart (2009)
- Creed (2015)
- Crimes of the Heart (1986)
- Crocodile Dundee (1986)
- Crouching Tiger, Hidden Dragon (2000)
- Cyrano de Bergerac (1950)

== D ==
- Dallas Buyers Club (2013)
- Dances with Wolves (1990)
- Darkest Hour (2017)
- The Dark Knight (2008)
- Death of a Salesman (1951)
- The Deer Hunter (1978)
- The Defiant Ones (1958)
- The Departed (2006)
- The Descendants (2011)
- The Devil Wears Prada (2006)
- Diary of a Mad Housewife (1970)
- A Different Man (2024)
- Dirty Dancing (1987)
- The Diving Bell and the Butterfly (Le scaphandre et le papillon) (2007)
- Divorce, Italian Style (Divorzio all'italiana) (1962)
- Two Eyes, Twelve Hands (Do Aankhen Barah Haath) (1957)
- Doctor Dolittle (1967)
- Doctor Zhivago (1965)
- A Double Life (1947)
- Dreamgirls (2006)
- The Dresser (1983)
- Drive My Car (Doraibu mai kā) (2021)
- Driving Miss Daisy (1989)
- Dune (2021)

== E ==
- East of Eden (1955)
- Educating Rita (1983)
- Ed Wood (1994)
- Elizabeth (1998)
- Elmer Gantry (1960)
- Elvis (2022)
- The Emigrants (Utvandrarna) (1972)
- Emilia Pérez (2024)
- Encanto (2021)
- Enchanted April (1992)
- The English Patient (1996)
- Equus (1977)
- Erin Brockovich (2000)
- E.T. the Extra-Terrestrial (1982)
- Europa Europa (1990)
- Everything Everywhere All at Once (2022)
- Evita (1997)
- Exodus (1960)
- The Exorcist (1973)

== F ==
- The Fabelmans (2022)
- The Fabulous Baker Boys (1989)
- The Fall of the Roman Empire (1964)
- Farinelli (1994)
- Fences (2016)
- Fiddler on the Roof (1971)
- The Fighter (2010)
- The Fisher King (1991)
- Five Easy Pieces (1970)
- Flashdance (1983)
- Flow (2024)
- Forrest Gump (1994)
- For the Boys (1991)
- For Whom the Bell Tolls (1943)
- Four Weddings and a Funeral (1994)
- The French Connection (1971)
- The French Lieutenant's Woman (1981)
- Frida (2002)
- From Here to Eternity (1953)
- The Fugitive (1993)
- Funny Girl (1968)

== G ==
- Gandhi (1982)
- Gangs of New York (2002)
- Gaslight (1944)
- Gentleman's Agreement (1947)
- Georgy Girl (1966)
- Get Shorty (1995)
- Ghost (1990)
- Gigi (1958)
- Girl, Interrupted (1999)
- Gladiator (2000)
- Glory (1989)
- The Godfather (1972)
- Gods and Monsters (1998)
- Going My Way (1944)
- The Goodbye Girl (1977)
- Goodbye, Mr. Chips (1969)
- Good Morning, Vietnam (1987)
- Good Will Hunting (1997)
- Gorillas in the Mist (1988)
- Gosford Park (2001)
- The Graduate (1967)
- The Grand Budapest Hotel (2014)
- The Greatest Show on Earth (1952)
- The Great Gatsby (1974)
- Green Book (2018)
- Green Card (1990)
- Guillermo del Toro's Pinocchio (2022)
- The Guns of Navarone (1961)
- Guys and Dolls (1955)
- Gypsy (1962)

== H ==
- Hamlet (1948)
- The Hangover (2009)
- Hannah and Her Sisters (1986)
- Happy-Go-Lucky (2008)
- Harry and Tonto (1974)
- Harvey (1950)
- The Hateful Eight (2015)
- Hawaii (1966)
- Heaven Can Wait (1978)
- Heaven & Earth (1993)
- The Heiress (1949)
- The Help (2011)
- The High and the Mighty (1954)
- High Noon (1951)
- Hope and Glory (1987)
- The Holdovers (2023)
- The Hospital (1971)
- The Hours (2002)
- The House I Live In (1945)
- Howards End (1992)
- Hugo (2011)
- The Hurricane (1999)
- Hush… Hush, Sweet Charlotte (1964)

== I ==
- I, Tonya (2017)
- I Care a Lot (2020)
- I Remember Mama (1944)
- I Want to Live! (1958)
- The Idolmaker (1980)
- I'm Not There (2007)
- I'm Still Here (2024)
- Imitation of Life (1959)
- Inglourious Basterds (2009)
- Inside Daisy Clover (1965)
- Inside Out (2015)
- The Inspector General (1949)
- In a Better World (2010)
- In Bruges (2008)
- In the Bedroom (2001)
- In the Heat of the Night (1967)
- Into the Wild (2007)
- Iris (2001)
- Irma la Douce (1963)
- The Iron Lady (2011)
- Islam (1978)
- It's a Wonderful Life (1946)

== J ==
- Jacqueline Susann's Once Is Not Enough (1975)
- Jaws (1975)
- Jerry Maguire (1996)
- JFK (1991)
- Johnny Belinda (1948)
- Joker (2019)
- Jonathan Livingston Seagull (1973)
- Joy (2015)
- Judas and the Black Messiah (2020)
- Judgment at Nuremberg (1961)
- Judy (2019)
- Julia (1977)
- Julie & Julia (2009)

== K ==
- The Kids Are All Right (2010)
- The Killing Fields (1984)
- The King and I (1956)
- Killers of the Flower Moon (2023)
- King Richard (2021)
- The King's Speech (2010)
- Klute (1971)
- Kramer vs. Kramer (1979)

== L ==
- L.A. Confidential (1997)
- Lady Bird (2017)
- La La Land (2016)
- La Vie En Rose (La môme) (2007)
- The Last Emperor (1987)
- The Last King of Scotland (2006)
- The Last Picture Show (1971)
- Lawrence of Arabia (1962)
- Leaving Las Vegas (1995)
- The Legend of 1900 (1998)
- Les Girls (1957)
- The Life Ahead (2020)
- Life with Father (1947)
- Lilies of the Field (1963)
- The Lion in Winter (1968)
- The Lion King (1994)
- The Little Mermaid (1989)
- The Little Prince (1974)
- Little Voice (1998)
- The Longest Yard (1974)
- Longtime Companion (1990)
- The Lord of the Rings: The Return of the King (2003)
- Lost in Translation (2003)
- The Lost Weekend (1945)
- Love Story (1970)
- Lust for Life (1956)
- The L-Shaped Room (1963)

== M ==
- Ma Rainey's Black Bottom (2020)
- Madame Sousatzka (1988)
- Magnolia (1999)
- A Majority of One (1961)
- A Man and a Woman (1966)
- A Man for All Seasons (1966)
- Manchester by the Sea (2016)
- The Manchurian Candidate (1962)
- Man on the Moon (1999)
- Marathon Man (1976)
- The Martian (2015)
- Marriage Story (2019)
- Marty (1955)
- Mary Poppins (1964)
- MASH (1970)
- The Mauritanian (2020)
- A Medal for Benny (1945)
- Melvin and Howard (1980)
- Memoirs of a Geisha (2005)
- Me, Natalie (1969)
- Me and the Colonel (1958)
- Micki + Maude (1984)
- Midnight Express (1978)
- Mighty Aphrodite (1995)
- Minari (2020)
- Miracle on 34th Street (1947)
- The Mirror Has Two Faces (1996)
- Misery (1990)
- Missing Link (2019)
- The Mission (1986)
- Mister 880 (1950)
- Mogambo (1953)
- Mona Lisa (1986)
- Monster (2003)
- Moonlight (2016)
- Moonstruck (1987)
- The Moon Is Blue (1953)
- Moulin Rouge! (2001)
- Mourning Becomes Electra (1947)
- Mrs Brown (1997)
- Mrs. Doubtfire (1993)
- Mrs. Parkington (1944)
- The Music Man (1962)
- Mystic River (2003)
- My Fair Lady (1964)
- My Six Convicts (1952)
- My Week with Marilyn (2011)

== N ==
- Network (1976)
- A Night to Remember (1959)
- The Ninth Configuration (1980)
- No Country for Old Men (2007)
- No Time to Die (2021)
- Nomadland (2020)
- Norma Rae (1979)
- Nurse Betty (2000)

== O ==
- An Officer and a Gentleman (1982)
- Oliver! (1968)
- One Flew Over the Cuckoo's Nest (1975)
- Once Upon a Time in Hollywood (2019)
- Only When I Laugh (1981)
- On Golden Pond (1981)
- On the Beach (1959)
- On the Riviera (1951)
- On the Waterfront (1954)
- Oppenheimer (2023)
- Ordinary People (1980)
- Osama (2003)
- Out of Africa (1985)
- O Brother, Where Art Thou? (2000)

== P ==
- The Painted Veil (2006)
- Pal Joey (1957)
- The Paper Chase (1973)
- A Passage to India (1984)
- Patton (1970)
- Pennies from Heaven (1981)
- The People vs. Larry Flynt (1996)
- Philadelphia (1993)
- The Piano (1993)
- Picnic (1955)
- The Picture of Dorian Gray (1945)
- Places in the Heart (1984)
- A Place in the Sun (1951)
- Platoon (1986)
- The Player (1992)
- Pocahontas (1995)
- Pocketful of Miracles (1961)
- Poor Things (2023)
- Porgy and Bess (1959)
- The Poseidon Adventure (1972)
- The Power of the Dog (2021)
- Precious (2009)
- Pretty Woman (1990)
- Primal Fear (1996)
- The Prince of Tides (1991)
- Prizzi's Honor (1985)
- Psycho (1960)
- Pulp Fiction (1994)
- The Pumpkin Eater (1964)
- The Purple Rose of Cairo (1985)

== Q ==
- The Queen (2006)
- Quo Vadis (1951)

== R ==
- Rachel, Rachel (1968)
- Raging Bull (1980)
- The Rainmaker (1956)
- Rain Man (1988)
- Ray (2004)
- The Razor's Edge (1946)
- The Reader (2008)
- A Real Pain (2024)
- Reds (1981)
- The Red Shoes (1948)
- The Revenant (2015)
- Reversal of Fortune (1990)
- Revolutionary Road (2008)
- Richard III
- The Robe (1953)
- Rocketman (2019)
- Rocky (1976)
- Romancing the Stone (1984)
- Roman Holiday (1953)
- Roma (2018)
- Room (2015)
- A Room with a View (1986)
- Rosemary's Baby (1968)
- The Rose Tattoo (1955)
- The Rose (1979)
- The Royal Tenenbaums (2001)
- RRR (2022)
- Runaway Train (1985)
- Running on Empty (1988)
- The Russians Are Coming, the Russians Are Coming (1966)
- Ryan's Daughter (1970)

== S ==
- Same Time, Next Year (1978)
- The Sand Pebbles (1966)
- Saving Private Ryan (1998)
- Sayonara (1957)
- Scent of a Woman (1992)
- Schindler's List (1993)
- Scrooge (1970)
- The Sea Inside (a.k.a. Mar adentro, 2004)
- The Secret of Santa Vittoria (1969)
- Secrets & Lies (1996)
- Sense and Sensibility (1995)
- Separate Tables (1958)
- A Separation (2011)
- September Affair (1951)
- Serpico (1973)
- Seven Days in May (1964)
- The Seven Year Itch (1955)
- Shaft (1971)
- Shakespeare in Love (1998)
- The Sheltering Sky (1990)
- Sherlock Holmes (2009)
- Shine (1996)
- The Shoes of the Fisherman (1968)
- Sideways (2004)
- The Silence of the Lambs (1991)
- Silkwood (1983)
- Singin' in the Rain (1952)
- Sister Kenny (1946)
- Slumdog Millionaire (2008)
- The Social Network (2010)
- Something's Gotta Give (2003)
- Some Like It Hot (1959)
- Son of Saul (2015)
- The Song of Bernadette (1943)
- Song Without End (1960)
- Sons and Lovers (1960)
- Sophie's Choice
- Soul (2020)
- The Sound of Music (1965)
- Spartacus (1960)
- Spectre (2015)
- The Spy Who Came in from the Cold (1965)
- Star! (1968)
- A Star Is Born (1954)
- A Star Is Born (1976)
- Star Wars Episode IV: A New Hope (1977)
- Stay Hungry (1976)
- Steel Magnolias (1989)
- Steve Jobs (2015)
- A Streetcar Named Desire (1951)
- The Stunt Man (1980)
- The Substance (2024)
- Suddenly, Last Summer (1959)
- Summer and Smoke (1961)
- Sunrise at Campobello (1960)
- Sunset Boulevard (1950)
- The Sunshine Boys (1975)
- Sweeney Todd: The Demon Barber of Fleet Street (2007)
- Sweet Bird of Youth (1962)
- Syriana (2005)

== T ==
- Tár (2022)
- Tender Mercies (1983)
- Terms of Endearment (1983)
- That Touch of Mink (1962)
- Thelma & Louise (1991)
- The Theory of Everything (2014)
- There Will Be Blood (2007)
- They Shoot Horses, Don't They? (1969)
- The Three Faces of Eve (1957)
- Three Little Words (1950)
- The Three Musketeers (1973)
- Thoroughly Modern Millie (1967)
- Tick, Tick... Boom! (2021)
- Titanic (1997)
- Tommy (1975)
- Tom Jones (1963)
- Tootsie (1982)
- Too Young to Kiss (1951)
- Top Gun (1986)
- A Touch of Class (1973)
- The Towering Inferno (1974)
- Toy Story 2 (1999)
- Toy Story 3 (2010)
- To Bed or Not to Bed (1963)
- To Die For (1995)
- To Kill a Mockingbird (1962)
- Traffic (2000)
- Transamerica (2005)
- The Treasure of the Sierra Madre (1948)
- Trial (1955)
- True Grit (1969)
- True Lies (1994)
- The Truman Show (1998)
- The Turning Point (1977)
- Tucker: The Man and His Dream (1988)
- Tumbleweeds (1999)
- Twelve Monkeys (1995)

== U ==
- Ulee's Gold (1997)
- Unforgiven (1992)
- The United States vs. Billie Holiday (2020)
- Up (2009)
- Up in the Air (2009)
- The Untouchables (1987)

== V ==
- Vice (2018)
- Vicky Cristina Barcelona (2008)
- Victor Victoria (1982)
- The V.I.P.s (1963)
- Voyage of the Damned (1976)

== W ==
- A Walk in the Clouds (1995)
- Walk the Line (2005)
- Wall Street (1987)
- WALL-E (2008)
- Waltz with Bashir (2008)
- Watch on the Rhine (1943)
- W.E. (2011)
- West Side Story (1961)
- West Side Story (2021)
- What's Love Got to Do with It (1993)
- The Whisperers (1967)
- The White Ribbon (2009)
- Wicked (2024)
- Wilson (1944)
- With a Song in My Heart (1952)
- Witness for the Prosecution (1957)
- A Woman Under the Influence (1974)
- Working Girl (1988)
- The Wrestler (2008)

== Y ==
- The Yearling (1946)
- Yentl (1983)

== Z ==
- Zootopia (2017)

== By year ==
1943

- For Whom the Bell Tolls
- The Song of Bernadette
- Watch on the Rhine

1944

- Gaslight
- Going My Way
- Mrs. Parkington
- Wilson

1945

- The Bells of St. Mary's
- The House I Live In
- The Lost Weekend
- A Medal for Benny
- The Picture of Dorian Gray

1946

- It's a Wonderful Life
- Sister Kenny
- The Best Years of Our Lives
- The Razor's Edge
- The Yearling

1947

- A Double Life
- Gentleman's Agreement
- Life with Father
- Miracle on 34th Street
- Mourning Becomes Electra

1948

- Hamlet
- I Remember Mama
- Johnny Belinda
- The Red Shoes
- The Treasure of the Sierra Madre

1949

- All the King's Men
- Battleground
- The Heiress
- The Inspector General

1950

- Born Yesterday
- Cyrano de Bergerac
- Harvey
- Mister 880
- Sunset Boulevard
- Three Little Words

1951

- A Place in the Sun
- A Streetcar Named Desire
- An American in Paris
- Death of a Salesman
- High Noon
- On the Riviera
- Quo Vadis
- September Affair
- The Blue Veil
- Too Young to Kiss

1952

- Come Back, Little Sheba
- My Six Convicts
- Singin' in the Rain
- The Greatest Show on Earth
- With a Song in My Heart

1953

- Call Me Madam
- From Here to Eternity
- Mogambo
- Roman Holiday
- The Actress
- The Moon Is Blue
- The Robe

1954

- A Star Is Born
- Carmen Jones
- On the Waterfront
- The Barefoot Contessa
- The Country Girl
- The High and the Mighty

1955

- East of Eden
- Guys and Dolls
- Marty
- Picnic
- Richard III
- The Rose Tattoo
- The Seven Year Itch
- Trial

1956

- Anastasia
- Around the World in Eighty Days
- Baby Doll
- Lust for Life
- The Bad Seed
- The King and I
- The Rainmaker

1957

- Les Girls
- Pal Joey
- Sayonara
- The Bridge on the River Kwai
- The Three Faces of Eve
- Witness for the Prosecution

1958

- Auntie Mame
- Gigi
- I Want to Live!
- Me and the Colonel
- Separate Tables
- The Big Country
- The Defiant Ones

1959

- A Night to Remember
- Ben-Hur
- Career
- Imitation of Life
- On the Beach
- Porgy and Bess
- Some Like It Hot
- Suddenly, Last Summer

1960

- Elmer Gantry
- Exodus
- Psycho
- Song Without End
- Sons and Lovers
- Spartacus
- Sunrise at Campobello
- The Alamo
- The Apartment

1961

- A Majority of One
- Judgment at Nuremberg
- Pocketful of Miracles
- Summer and Smoke
- The Guns of Navarone
- West Side Story

1962

- Divorce, Italian Style
- Gypsy
- Lawrence of Arabia
- Sweet Bird of Youth
- That Touch of Mink
- The L-Shaped Room
- The Manchurian Candidate
- The Music Man
- To Kill a Mockingbird

1963

- America, America
- Irma la Douce
- Lilies of the Field
- The Cardinal
- The V.I.P.s
- To Bed or Not to Bed
- Tom Jones

1964

- Becket
- Hush… Hush, Sweet Charlotte
- Mary Poppins
- My Fair Lady
- Seven Days in May
- The Fall of the Roman Empire
- The Pumpkin Eater

1965

- Cat Ballou
- Doctor Zhivago
- Inside Daisy Clover
- The Collector
- The Sound of Music
- The Spy Who Came in from the Cold

1966

- A Man and a Woman
- A Man for All Seasons
- Georgy Girl
- Hawaii
- The Russians Are Coming, the Russians Are Coming
- The Sand Pebbles

1967

- Camelot
- Doctor Dolittle
- In the Heat of the Night
- The Graduate
- The Whisperers
- Thoroughly Modern Millie

1968

- Charly
- Funny Girl
- Oliver!
- Rachel, Rachel
- Rosemary's Baby
- Star!
- The Lion in Winter
- The Shoes of the Fisherman

1969

- Anne of the Thousand Days
- Butch Cassidy and the Sundance Kid
- Cactus Flower
- Goodbye, Mr. Chips
- Me, Natalie
- The Secret of Santa Vittoria
- They Shoot Horses, Don't They?
- True Grit

1970

- Airport
- Diary of a Mad Housewife
- Five Easy Pieces
- Love Story
- MASH
- Patton
- Ryan's Daughter
- Scrooge

1971

- Carnal Knowledge
- Fiddler on the Roof
- Klute
- Shaft
- The Boy Friend
- The Emigrants
- The French Connection
- The Hospital
- The Last Picture Show

1972

- Avanti!
- Cabaret
- The Godfather
- The Poseidon Adventure

1973

- A Touch of Class
- American Graffiti
- Cinderella Liberty
- Jonathan Livingston Seagull
- Serpico
- The Exorcist
- The Paper Chase
- The Three Musketeers

1974

- A Woman Under the Influence
- Chinatown
- Harry and Tonto
- The Great Gatsby
- The Little Prince
- The Longest Yard
- The Towering Inferno

1975

- Jacqueline Susann's Once Is Not Enough
- Jaws
- One Flew Over the Cuckoo's Nest
- The Sunshine Boys
- Tommy

1976

- A Star Is Born
- Marathon Man
- Network
- Rocky
- Stay Hungry
- Voyage of the Damned

1977

- Annie Hall
- Equus
- Julia
- Star Wars Episode IV: A New Hope
- The Goodbye Girl
- The Turning Point

1978

- California Suite
- Coming Home
- Heaven Can Wait
- Islam
- Midnight Express
- Same Time, Next Year
- The Deer Hunter

1979

- Apocalypse Now
- Being There
- Breaking Away
- Kramer vs. Kramer
- Norma Rae
- The Rose

1980

- Coal Miner's Daughter
- Melvin and Howard
- Ordinary People
- Raging Bull
- The Idolmaker
- The Ninth Configuration
- The Stunt Man

1981

- Arthur
- On Golden Pond
- Only When I Laugh
- Pennies from Heaven
- Reds
- The French Lieutenant's Woman

1982

- An Officer and a Gentleman
- E.T. the Extra-Terrestrial
- Gandhi
- Sophie's Choice
- Tootsie
- Victor Victoria

1983

- Educating Rita
- Flashdance
- Silkwood
- Tender Mercies
- Terms of Endearment
- The Dresser
- Yentl

1984

- A Passage to India
- Amadeus
- Micki + Maude
- Places in the Heart
- Romancing the Stone
- The Killing Fields

1985

- Agnes of God
- Out of Africa
- Prizzi's Honor
- Runaway Train
- The Color Purple
- The Purple Rose of Cairo

1986

- A Room with a View
- Children of a Lesser God
- Crimes of the Heart
- Crocodile Dundee
- The Assault (De aanslag)
- Hannah and Her Sisters
- Mona Lisa
- Platoon
- The Mission
- Top Gun

1987

- Anna
- Dirty Dancing
- Good Morning, Vietnam
- Hope and Glory
- Moonstruck
- The Last Emperor
- The Untouchables
- Wall Street

1988

- Big
- Bird
- Buster
- Gorillas in the Mist
- Madame Sousatzka
- Rain Man
- Running on Empty
- The Accused
- Tucker: The Man and His Dream
- Working Girl

1989

- Born on the Fourth of July
- Driving Miss Daisy
- Glory
- Steel Magnolias
- The Fabulous Baker Boys
- The Little Mermaid

1990

- Dances with Wolves
- Europa Europa
- Ghost
- Green Card
- Longtime Companion
- Misery
- Pretty Woman
- Reversal of Fortune
- The Sheltering Sky

1991

- Beauty and the Beast
- Bugsy
- City Slickers
- For the Boys
- JFK
- The Fisher King
- The Prince of Tides
- The Silence of the Lambs
- Thelma & Louise

1992

- Aladdin
- Enchanted April
- Howards End
- Scent of a Woman
- The Player
- Unforgiven

1993

- Heaven & Earth
- Mrs. Doubtfire
- Philadelphia
- Schindler's List
- The Age of Innocence
- The Fugitive
- The Piano
- What's Love Got to Do with It

1994

- Blue Sky
- Bullets over Broadway
- Ed Wood
- Farinelli
- Forrest Gump
- Four Weddings and a Funeral
- Pulp Fiction
- The Lion King
- True Lies

1995

- A Walk in the Clouds
- Babe
- Braveheart
- Casino
- Get Shorty
- Leaving Las Vegas
- Mighty Aphrodite
- Pocahontas
- Sense and Sensibility
- To Die For
- Twelve Monkeys

1996

- Jerry Maguire
- Primal Fear
- Secrets & Lies
- Shine
- The English Patient
- The Mirror Has Two Faces
- The People vs. Larry Flynt

1997

- As Good as It Gets
- Boogie Nights
- Evita
- Good Will Hunting
- L.A. Confidential
- Mrs Brown
- Titanic
- Ulee's Gold

1998

- Elizabeth
- Gods and Monsters
- Little Voice
- Saving Private Ryan
- Shakespeare in Love
- The Legend of 1900
- The Truman Show

1999

- American Beauty
- Boys Don't Cry
- Girl, Interrupted
- Magnolia
- Man on the Moon
- The Hurricane
- Toy Story 2
- Tumbleweeds

2000

- Almost Famous
- Cast Away
- Crouching Tiger, Hidden Dragon
- Erin Brockovich
- Gladiator
- Nurse Betty
- O Brother, Where Art Thou?
- Traffic

2001

- A Beautiful Mind
- Gosford Park
- In the Bedroom
- Iris
- Moulin Rouge!
- The Royal Tenenbaums

2002

- About Schmidt
- Adaptation.
- Chicago
- Frida
- Gangs of New York
- The Hours

2003

- Cold Mountain
- Lost in Translation
- Monster
- Mystic River
- Osama
- Something's Gotta Give
- The Lord of the Rings: The Return of the King

2004

- Alfie
- Being Julia
- Closer
- Million Dollar Baby
- Ray
- Sideways
- The Aviator
- The Sea Inside [Mar adentro]

2005

- Brokeback Mountain
- Capote
- Memoirs of a Geisha
- Syriana
- The Constant Gardener

2006

- Babel
- Borat: Cultural Learnings of America for Make Benefit Glorious Nation of Kazakhstan
- Cars
- The Departed
- The Devil Wears Prada
- Dreamgirls
- The Last King of Scotland
- Letters from Iwo Jima
- The Painted Veil
- The Queen

2007

- Atonement
- Away from Her
- The Diving Bell and the Butterfly [Le scaphandre et le papillon]
- I'm Not There
- Into the Wild
- No Country for Old Men
- Ratatouille
- Sweeney Todd: The Demon Barber of Fleet Street
- There Will Be Blood
- La Vie en Rose [La môme]

2008

- The Dark Knight
- Happy-Go-Lucky
- In Bruges
- The Reader
- Revolutionary Road
- Slumdog Millionaire
- Vicky Cristina Barcelona
- WALL-E
- Waltz with Bashir [Vals im Bashir]
- The Wrestler

2009

- Avatar
- The Blind Side
- Crazy Heart
- The Hangover
- Inglourious Basterds
- Julie & Julia
- Precious
- Sherlock Holmes
- Up
- Up in the Air
- The White Ribbon [Das weiße Band]

2010

- Barney's Version
- Black Swan
- Burlesque
- The Fighter
- In a Better World [Hævnen]
- The Kids Are All Right
- The King's Speech
- The Social Network
- Toy Story 3

2011

- The Adventures of Tintin: The Secret of the Unicorn
- The Artist
- Beginners
- The Descendants
- The Help
- Hugo
- The Iron Lady
- My Week with Marilyn
- A Separation [Jodái-e Náder az Simin]
- W.E.

2012

- Argo
- Love [Amour]
- Brave
- Django Unchained
- Life of Pi
- Lincoln
- Les Misérables
- Silver Linings Playbook
- Skyfall
- Zero Dark Thirty

2013

- 12 Years a Slave
- All Is Lost
- American Hustle
- Blue Jasmine
- Dallas Buyers Club
- Frozen
- Gravity
- The Great Beauty [La grande bellezza]
- Her
- Mandela: Long Walk to Freedom

2014

- The Grand Budapest Hotel
- The Theory of Everything

2015

- The Martian
- Steve Jobs
- The Revenant

2016

- Moonlight
- Manchester by the Sea
- La La Land

2017

- Lady Bird
- Three Billboards Outside Ebbing, Missouri
- Darkest Hour
- I, Tonya

2018

- Bohemian Rhapsody
- Green Book
- Roma
- Vice

2019

- Rocketman
- Once Upon a Time in Hollywood
- Judy
- Joker
- Marriage Story
- 1917

2020

- Borat Subsequent Moviefilm
- I Care a Lot
- Judas and the Black Messiah
- The Life Ahead
- Ma Rainey's Black Bottom
- The Mauritanian
- Minari
- Nomadland
- Soul
- The United States vs. Billie Holiday

2021

- Being the Ricardos
- Belfast
- Drive My Car
- Dune
- Encanto
- King Richard
- No Time to Die
- The Power of the Dog
- Tick, Tick... Boom!
- West Side Story

2022

- Argentina, 1985
- Babylon
- The Banshees of Inisherin
- Black Panther: Wakanda Forever
- Everything Everywhere All at Once
- Elvis
- The Fabelmans
- Guillermo del Toro's Pinocchio
- RRR
- Tár

2023

- Anatomy of a Fall
- Barbie
- The Boy and the Heron
- Oppenheimer
- Killers of the Flower Moon
- The Holdovers
- Poor Things

2024

- The Brutalist
- Challengers
- Conclave
- A Different Man
- Emilia Pérez
- Flow
- I'm Still Here
- A Real Pain
- The Substance
- Wicked
