= Eichwald (surname) =

Eichwald is a German surname. Notable people with the surname include;

- Ernst J. Eichwald (1913–2007), American pathologist
- Karl Eichwald (1795–1876), Russian geologist and physician
- Maria Eichwald, Kazakhstani dancer
- Michaela Eichwald, German painter
