= The White Ribbon =

2009 German mystery drama film by Michael Haneke

- Theatrical release poster
- German: Das Weiße Band - Eine Deutsche Kindergeschichte
- Literally: The White Ribbon - A German Children's Story
- Directed by: Michael Haneke
- Written by: Michael Haneke
- Produced by: Stefan Arndt; Veit Heiduschka; Michael Katz; Margaret Ménégoz; Andrea Occhipinti
- Starring: Christian Friedel; Ulrich Tukur; Josef Bierbichler
- Narrated by: Ernst Jacobi
- Cinematography: Christian Berger
- Edited by: Monika Willi
- Production companies: Wega Film; X Filme Creative Pool
- Distributed by: Filmladen (Austria); X Verleih AG (though Warner Bros.) (Germany)
- Release date: 21 May 2009 (Cannes)
- Running time: 144 minutes
- Country: Germany
- Language: German
- Budget: US$18 million
- Box office: US$19.3 million

The White Ribbon (German: Das Weiße Band - Eine Deutsche Kindergeschichte, lit. 'The White Ribbon - A German Children's Story') is a 2009 German mystery drama film written and directed by Michael Haneke. Released in black-and-white, the film offers a dark depiction of society and family in an eastern German village just before World War I. According to Haneke, The White Ribbon "is about the roots of evil. Whether it's religious or political terrorism, it's the same thing."

The film premiered at the 2009 Cannes Film Festival where it won the Palme d'Or, followed by largely positive reviews and several other major awards, including the 2010 Golden Globe Award for Best Foreign Language Film. The film also received two nominations at the 82nd Academy Awards in 2009: Best Foreign Language Film (representing Germany) and Best Cinematography (Christian Berger).

== Plot ==
An unnamed elderly tailor narrates the parable, recounting events from a distant year in which he worked as a village schoolteacher and met his fiancée Eva, a nanny. The setting is the fictitious Protestant village of Eichwald, in the Junker-dominated region of eastern Germany, from July 1913 to 9 August 1914, where the local pastor, doctor and baron rule over the area's women, children and peasant farmers.

The puritanical pastor leads confirmation classes and gives his pubescent children a guilty conscience over apparently small transgressions. He has them wear white ribbons as a reminder of the innocence and purity from which they have strayed. When under interrogation, his son confesses to 'impure' touching; the pastor has the boy's hands tied to his bed frame each night. The doctor, a widower, treats the village children kindly but humiliates his housekeeper (the local midwife, with whom he is having an affair) and also sexually abuses his teenage daughter. The baron, who is the lord of the manor, underwrites harvest festivities for the villagers, many of them his farm workers.

Eventually, the schoolteacher's friendship with Eva, the baron's nanny, leads to a visit to her family home during a Christmas break; asking for her hand in marriage, he receives from her taciturn father a reluctant permission to marry, but only after a one-year test-period delay.

Unexplained harmful events occur over the course of the story. A wire is stretched between two trees, causing the doctor to fall from his horse. An overworked farmer's wife dies at the sawmill when rotten floorboards give way, after which his son symbolically destroys the baron's cabbage field. Her grieving husband later hangs himself. The baron's young son Sigi goes missing on the day of the harvest festival and is found the following morning in the sawmill, bound and badly caned; the baron summarily dismisses Eva as a result. A barn at the manor burns down. After an Italian sojourn, the baroness tells her husband that she is in love with another man, and intends to leave Eichwald. Shortly after the pastor berates his daughter in front of the confirmation class, she opens his parakeet's cage with scissors in hand; the pastor finds the bird on his desk, cruelly impaled in the shape of a cross. The daughter of the steward at the baron's estate claims a violent dream-premonition about harm coming to the midwife's handicapped son, then the boy is attacked and almost blinded, found during a night search along with a well-written note quoting Exodus 20:5. The steward violently thrashes his son for stealing a flute from Sigi.

The midwife urgently commandeers a bicycle from the schoolteacher to go to the police in town, claiming that her son told her who attacked him. She and her son are not seen again. Meanwhile, the doctor and his family have also suddenly disappeared, leaving a note on the door indicating his practice is closed. The schoolteacher's growing suspicions lead to a confrontation in the pastor's rectory, where he suggests that the pastor's children and students had prior knowledge of the local troubles and insinuates that they likely perpetrated them. Offended, the pastor berates him and threatens to report him to the authorities and send him to jail if he repeats his accusations. Rumors that the doctor and midwife were at fault for the disturbing events begin to swirl.

The film ends a few days after World War I officially begins, with the final scene occurring in Sunday church on the day of a visit from the narrator's prospective father-in-law. Disquiet remains in the village, with no good explanation of the violent events. The narrator is eventually drafted, leaving Eichwald, never to return.

== Cast ==
- Christian Friedel as the school teacher
- Ernst Jacobi as narrator (voice only, the school teacher as a much older man)
- Leonie Benesch as Eva, nanny to the baron and baroness's twin babies for a short time
- Ulrich Tukur as the baron
- Ursina Lardi as the baroness, Marie-Louise
- Fion Mutert as Sigmund, their oldest son
- Michael Kranz as Sigmund's tutor
- Burghart Klaußner as the pastor
- Steffi Kühnert as Anna, the pastor's wife
- Maria-Victoria Dragus as Klara, their oldest daughter
- Leonard Proxauf as Martin, their oldest son
- Levin Henning as Adolf
- Johanna Busse as Margarete
- Thibault Sérié as Gustav
- Josef Bierbichler as the baron's steward
- Gabriela Maria Schmeide as Emma, his wife
- Janina Fautz as Erna, their daughter
- Enno Trebs as Georg
- Theo Trebs as Ferdinand
- Rainer Bock as the doctor
- Roxane Duran as Anna, the doctor's daughter
- Susanne Lothar as the midwife and doctor's assistant
- Eddy Grahl as Karli, her son
- Branko Samarovski as a peasant
- Birgit Minichmayr as Frieda
- Aaron Denkel as Kurti
- Detlev Buck as Eva's father
- Carmen-Maja Antoni as the bathing midwife

== Production ==
Michael Haneke has said the project was in development for more than ten years. The initial version of the script was written as a television mini-series for the Austrian broadcaster ORF, but when no co-producer who was willing to invest in the project had been found after five years had passed, Haneke decided to put the project on hold. Eventually revived as a feature film, the production was led by the Austrian company Wega Film. It was also co-produced by X Filme (Germany), Les Films du Losange (France) and Lucky Red (Italy). The film received financial support from Österreichisches Filminstitut, various local funds in Germany, the French CNC and the Council of Europe's film fund Eurimages. It had a total budget of around 12 million Euro.

More than 7,000 children were interviewed during the six-month-long casting period. For most of the adult roles, Haneke selected actors with whom he had worked before and therefore knew they were suitable for the roles. The role of the pastor was originally written for Ulrich Mühe, an actor who had starred in several of Haneke's past productions, but who died in 2007. Various actors were considered for replacement and eventually the part went to Burghart Klaußner, whom the director did not personally know before. Actors with significant stage experience were preferred because of the measured language of the screenplay.

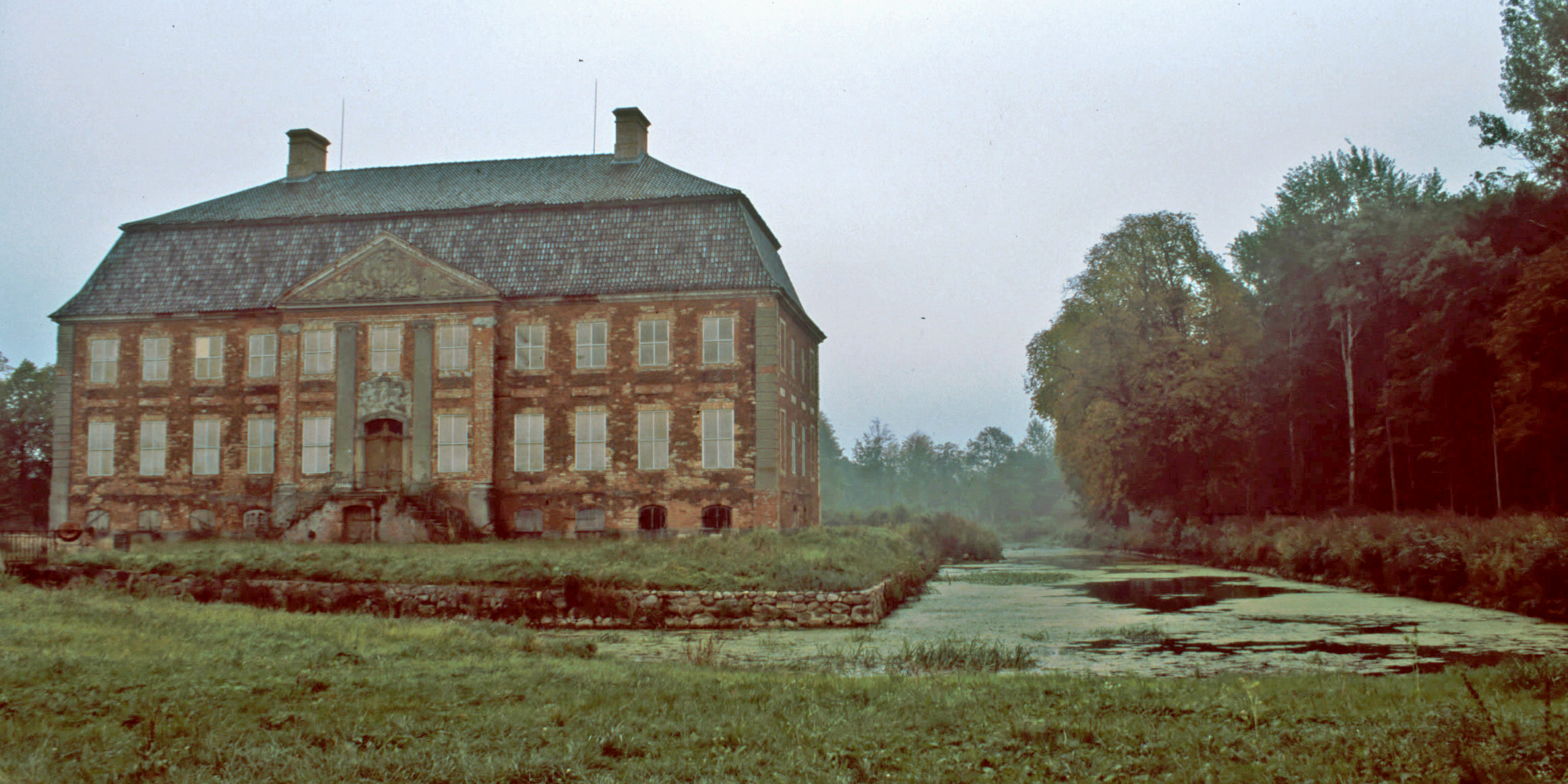
Schloss Johannstorf, a principal filming location, fell victim to arson 2025.

Filming took place between 9 June and 4 September 2008. Locations were used in Leipzig, Lübeck, Michaelisbruch (Dreetz) and Netzow (Plattenburg) and Dassow (Schloss Johannstorf, burnt down 2025). The choice to make the film in black and white was based partly on the resemblance to photographs of the era, but also to create a distancing effect. All scenes were originally shot in color and then altered to black and white. Christian Berger, Haneke's usual director of photography, shot the film in Super 35 using a Moviecam Compact. Before filming started, Berger studied the black-and-white films Ingmar Bergman made with Sven Nykvist as cinematographer. Haneke wanted the environments to be very dark, so many indoor scenes used only practical light sources such as oil lamps and candles. In some of the darkest scenes, where the crew had been forced to add artificial lighting, extra shadows could be removed in the digital post-production which allowed for extensive retouching. The team in Vienna also sharpened objects and facial expressions, and modern details were removed from the images. In the dance scene, where the camera moves in 360 degrees, tiles were added frame by frame to replace the original Eternit roofs. Critic Christian Buß suggested references in the name of the fictitious village, "Eichwald", to the Nazi Obersturmbannführer Adolf Eichmann and the Buchenwald concentration camp. Eichwald is, however, a common German place name, meaning "Oak Forest".

== Release ==
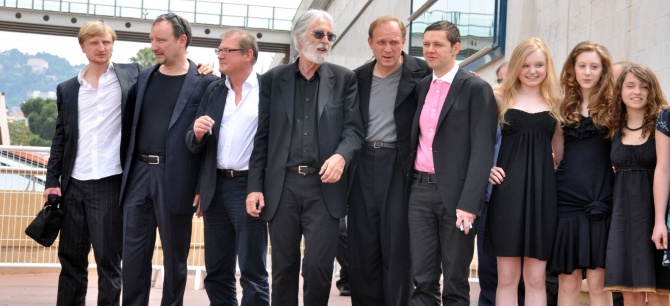
Cast and crew at the 2009 Cannes Film Festival for the premiere of the film

The film received its premiere on 21 May 2009 as an official selection at the 62nd Cannes Film Festival and had its theatrical release in Austria on 25 September 2009. In Germany, a release in selected cinemas on 17 September was followed by wide release on 15 October. American distribution by Sony Pictures Classics began 30 December 2009.

With a fully German cast and setting, as well as co-production by a German company, it has been discussed whether the film should be regarded as an Austrian or German production. Haneke himself has expressed indifference on the question: "In the Olympic Games the medal doesn't go to the country, but to the athlete." The general feeling is that it is primarily a Michael Haneke film.

== Reception ==
=== Critical response ===
German critics were positive. Julia Evers of Oberösterreichische Nachrichten called the film "an oppressive and impressive moral painting, in which neither the audience nor the people in the village find an escape valve from the web of authority, hierarchy and violence. [...] Everything in The White Ribbon is true. And that is why it is so difficult to bear." Markus Keuschnigg of Die Presse praised the "sober cinematography" along with the pacing of the narrative. Challenging accusations of Haneke's cinematic approach being cold and cynical, Keuschnigg instead hailed the director as uncompromising and sincerely humanistic. Die Welt's Peter Zander compared the film to Haneke's previous works Benny's Video and Funny Games, concluding that while the violence in the previous films had seemed distant and constructed, The White Ribbon demonstrates how it is a part of human society. Zander also applauded the "perfectly cast children", whom he held as "the real stars of this film". In Der Spiegel, Christian Buß opined that the work is "a horror drama, free from horror images", and praised its deviations from conventions of contemporary German cinema, writing that "Haneke forces us to learn how to see again".

The White Ribbon received largely positive reviews in English-language publications as well, garnering an 84/100 on Metacritic. Review aggregator Rotten Tomatoes also reports that 85% of critics have given the film a positive review based on 146 reviews, with an average score of 8.10/10. Mick LaSalle of the San Francisco Chronicle wrote, "What makes 'The White Ribbon' a big movie, an important movie, is that Haneke's point extends beyond pre-Nazi Germany. [...] It might have been Bolshevism or any ideology that encourages blind devotion, that flatters people's vanity by telling them they're intelligent for not thinking and that they're virtuous for believing themselves better than their fellow citizens."

However, critics such as Claudia Puig of USA Today praised the film's cinematography and performances while criticizing its "glacial pace" and "lack [of] the satisfaction of a resolution or catharsis." Ann Hornaday of The Washington Post wrote that trying to locate the seeds of fascism in religious hypocrisy and authoritarianism is "a simplistic notion, disturbing not in its surprise or profundity, but in the sadistic trouble the filmmaker has taken to advance it." In The New York Times, A. O. Scott accused it of "mystifying the historical phenomenon it purports to investigate. [...] 'The White Ribbon' is a whodunit that offers a philosophically and aesthetically unsatisfying answer: everyone. Which is also to say: no one." Roger Ebert of The Chicago Sun-Times gave the film four stars out of four, writing, "The White Ribbon tells a simple story in a village about little people and suggests that we must find a balance between fear and security."

=== Accolades and awards ===
At the Cannes Film Festival in 2009, the film received the jury's highest prize, the Palme d'Or, and the international film critics' prize, plus a special mention from the Ecumenical Jury. This was followed in August by the FIPRESCI Grand Prix for best film of the year. It won three major prizes at the 2009 European Film Awards, held in Bochum, Germany, for Best Film, Best Director and Best Screenwriter. At the 67th annual Golden Globes, the film won the Golden Globe Award for Best Foreign Language Film. In 2010 the film won the BBC Four World Cinema Award.

The film was a nominee in the category Best Foreign Language Film at the 82nd Academy Awards. Its submission as an entry of Germany rather than Austria was the source of some controversy, since the academy would have accepted it as a submission from either country. Martin Schweighofer, head of the Austrian Film Commission, expressed misgivings about the decision: "The discomfort arises because of the vague rules of the Academy. In essential functions the film is Austrian." It has been reported that the American distributor, Sony Pictures Classics, pressured Germany to submit it rather than Austria because the academy had nominated Austrian films two years running and three in a row was considered unlikely.

In April 2010, the film received ten Lolas at the German Film Awards, including Best Picture, Best Director and Best Actor.

The White Ribbon received 10 votes in the British Film Institute's 2012 Sight & Sound polls, and in 2016 ranked 18th on an international critics' poll of the greatest films since 2000.

In July 2025, it ranked number 81 on Rolling Stone's list of "The 100 Best Movies of the 21st Century."

In July 2025, it was one of the films voted for the "Readers' Choice" edition of The New York Times' list of "The 100 Best Movies of the 21st Century," finishing at number 302.
