= Golden Globes =

Annual awards for film and TV productions

- Current: 83rd Golden Globe Awards
- Golden Globes logo (as of 2025)
- Awarded for: Excellence in international film and television
- Country: United States
- Presented by: Hollywood Foreign Correspondents Association (1943–1954); Foreign Correspondents of Hollywood (1951–1954); Hollywood Foreign Press Association (1955–2023); Golden Globes LLC (Penske Media Corporation and Eldridge Industries) (since 2024)
- First award: January 20, 1944; 82 years ago
- Website: goldenglobes.com

Television/radio coverage
- Network: KTTV (1960–1964); NBC (1965–1968, 1978, 1996–2021, 2023); CBS (1981–1982; 2024–present); Syndicated (1983–1988); TBS (1989–1995); Peacock (2023); Paramount+ (since 2024)
- The new HFPA Trophy, which launched in January 2019.

The Golden Globes, formerly the Golden Globe Awards, is an American awards season and award ceremony event, first held in 1944. Organized to honor excellence in international film and television, as well as amateur and professional artists and their work/craft, the ceremony is normally held every January, and has been a major part of the film industry's awards season, which culminates each year with the Academy Awards. The eligibility period for Golden Globes extends a whole calendar year under review. The Golden Globes were not televised from 1969 to 1972, in 1979 or in 2022. The 2008 ceremony was canceled due to the 2007–08 Writers Guild of America strike, while the 2022 ceremony was downsized to a non-televised gala due to a lack of broadcasters.

The ceremony was originally established and organized by the Hollywood Foreign Press Association (HFPA), a group representing international journalists covering the United States' entertainment industry. In 2022, amid criticism and boycotts of the HFPA over aspects of its operations (including a lack of diversity in its membership), interim CEO Todd Boehly announced that the Golden Globe Awards would be reformed as a for-profit entity under his investment firm Eldridge Industries (the parent company of Dick Clark Productions, which had produced the event since 1993), and that a new non-profit entity would be formed to continue the HFPA's philanthropic activities. The restructuring took effect on June 12, 2023, with the Golden Globes being acquired by Dick Clark Productions (via Golden Globes LLC), the HFPA's philanthropic activities transitioned to the Golden Globe Foundation and the HFPA disbanding and dissolving itself.

== History ==
The Hollywood Foreign Press Association (HFPA) was founded in 1943 as the Hollywood Foreign Correspondent Association (HFCA) by Los Angeles–based foreign journalists seeking to develop a better-organized process of gathering and distributing cinema news to non-U.S. markets. One of the organization's first major endeavors was to establish a ceremony similar to the Academy Awards to honor film achievements. The 1st Golden Globe Awards ceremony, honoring the best achievements in 1943 filmmaking, was held on January 20, 1944, at the 20th Century-Fox studios. Subsequent ceremonies were held at various venues throughout the next decade, including the Beverly Hills Hotel and the Hollywood Roosevelt Hotel.

=== Foreign Press Association of Hollywood's Henrietta Awards ===
In 1950, some of the journalists in the HFCA broke away to form the Foreign Press Association of Hollywood (FPAH). It was the FPAH that instituted the Henrietta Award for World Film Favorite, which was subsequently given out by the Hollywood Foreign Press Association, the new name for the organization when the FPAH and HFCA merged in 1955, minus the "Henrietta" name through 1980 (for the 1979 movie year).

The FPAH held its first World Film Favorite Festival on January 27, 1951, giving out Henrietta Awards in various categories. The award, an angel above a globe raised on four tall pillars, was named for the president of the FPAH, Henry Gris. Winners of the Henrietta for World Film Favorite were Gregory Peck and Jane Wyman. At the FPAH's second World Film Favorite Festival, held on January 26, 1952, the Henrietta was a large statuette of a naked woman holding a flower. Based on an international poll of 900 newspapers, magazines and radio stations, Alan Ladd and Esther Williams were presented the gold Henrietta for World Favorites. while silver Henriettas for "Best Young Box Office Personality" were presented to Leslie Caron, Tony Curtis, John Derek, Mitzi Gaynor, Marilyn Monroe and Patrice Wymore. At the third festival held on February 14, 1953, John Wayne and Susan Hayward won the gold Henriettas.

The HFCA continued to hold their Golden Globe Awards. In 1952, the HFCA had established a special honorary award to recognize outstanding contributions to the entertainment industry. Recognizing its subject as an international figure within the entertainment industry, the first award was presented to director and producer Cecil B. DeMille. The official name of the award thus became the Cecil B. DeMille Award.

In January 1954, the two organizations held a joint ceremony, and the following year, they merged under the new Hollywood Foreign Press Association name. The Henrietta Award was terminated, but the HFPA instituted a special award called World Film Favorite, a Golden Globe surmounted by an angel. Similar to the Henrietta Award for World Film Favorite, the winner of the new HFPA Golden Globe was determined by a worldwide poll conducted by Reuters. This award, sometimes referred to as The Henrietta Award, was given out through 1980 for the 1979, movie year, when it was terminated.

=== Post-merger ===
The 13th Golden Globe Awards held in February 1956 saw the first Golden Globe in Television Achievement. The first three permanent television award categories, Best TV Series, Best TV Actor, and Best TV Actress, then made their debuts during the 19th Golden Globe Awards held in March 1962.

Beginning in 1963, the trophies commenced to be handed out by one or more persons referred to as "Miss Golden Globe", a title renamed on January 5, 2018, to "Golden Globe Ambassador". The holders of the position were, traditionally, the daughters or sometimes the sons of a celebrity, and as a point of pride, these often continued to be contested among celebrity parents.

In 2009, the Golden Globe statuette was redesigned (but not for the first time in its history). The New York firm Society Awards collaborated for a year with the HFPA to produce a statuette that included a unique marble and enhanced the statuette's quality and gold content. It was unveiled at a press conference at the Beverly Hilton prior to the show.

The Carol Burnett Award was created as a television counterpart to the Cecil B. DeMille Award, named after its first recipient in 2019, actress and comedian Carol Burnett.

=== Revenues from award broadcast ===
Revenues generated from the annual ceremony have enabled the HFPA to donate millions of dollars to entertainment-related charities, as well as funding scholarships and other programs for future film and television professionals. The most prominent beneficiary is the Young Artist Awards, presented annually by the Young Artist Foundation, established in 1978 by Hollywood Foreign Press member Maureen Dragone, to recognize and award excellence of young Hollywood performers under the age of 21 and to provide scholarships for young artists who may be physically or financially challenged.

=== 2022 boycott, acquisition by Dick Clark Productions ===
In 2021, the HFPA faced criticism for the lack of Black representation among its members. On May 3, 2021, the HFPA announced plans for a reform package, including a 50% increase in members over the next 18 months, as well as new positions, term limits, and practices to improve its accountability. However, Time's Up and a group of 100 PR firms criticized the lack of given timelines for filling some of the new management positions, arguing that they would not be completed soon enough to have any material impact on the cycle of the upcoming 79th Golden Globe Awards in January 2022. Time's Up further argued that the package "largely contains no specifics" nor "commitments to real accountability or change".

On May 7, 2021, both Amazon Studios and Netflix announced that they would cease their activities with the HFPA until sufficient actions on reforms were made. Other media companies followed suit on May 10, including NBC, which announced that it would not televise the 79th Golden Globe Awards, but that it would be open to televising the ceremony in 2023 if the HFPA were successful in its efforts to reform. WarnerMedia also boycotted the HFPA, while Tom Cruise returned the awards he had won for Born on the Fourth of July, Jerry Maguire and Magnolia in solidarity.

Following these events, the HFPA released a timeline for its reforms, which would see the process completed by the week of August 2. On October 1, the HFPA released a list of 21 new members that it had recruited under these reforms, and named Todd Boehly (owner of ceremony producer Dick Clark Productions) as its "interim CEO". The HFPA then announced on October 15 that it still planned to hold the 79th Golden Globe Awards on January 9, 2022, with or without another media partner. With the televised absence of the Golden Globe Awards from NBC, the Critics Choice Association attempted to shift their Critics' Choice Movie Awards ceremony up a week to fill the void and increase their overall prestige, though it was later delayed due to SARS-CoV-2 Omicron variant. The 79th ceremony was conducted as a non-televised, private presentation, with limited guests (particularly beneficiaries of the HFPA's philanthropic activities) and strict COVID-19 protocol due to Omicron variant.

In July 2022, the HFPA approved a major restructuring, under which Boehly would establish a for-profit entity via his holding company Eldridge Industries (owner of Dick Clark Productions—which has produced the Golden Globes' telecast since 1993, as well as the entertainment trade publication The Hollywood Reporter) that will hold the Golden Globe Awards' intellectual property and oversee the "professionalization and modernization" of the ceremony, including "[increasing] the size and diversity of the available voters for the annual awards". The HFPA's philanthropic activities were to continue separately as a non-profit entity. NBC subsequently agreed to a one-year contract to air the 80th Golden Globe Awards on January 10, 2023, which were moved to a Tuesday evening to avoid conflicting with the National Football League (whose regular season was recently extended into January) and the College Football Playoff National Championship (which was being hosted at SoFi Stadium in Inglewood).

On June 12, 2023, the Golden Globe Awards' assets and intellectual property were acquired by DCP (whose ownership includes Penske Media Corporation, owner of fellow entertainment publications Deadline Hollywood and Variety) and Eldridge; the financial details of the purchase were not disclosed. The HFPA's philanthropic activities were transferred to a new entity known as the Golden Globe Foundation.

At the 83rd Golden Globes in 2026, the Golden Globes introduced a new award for Best Podcast, with organizers citing the "seismic" growth of the podcast medium. The inaugural award was won by Amy Poehler for her weekly show, Good Hang with Amy Poehler.

==== Subsequent lawsuit ====
In July 2026, DCP co-owner Penske Media, Jay Penske, and Golden Globe Foundation CEO Gregory Goeckner were sued by the HFPA over the sale of the Golden Globes to DCP. The suit alleges that Penske had colluded with Boehly to orchestrate the acquisition of the Golden Globe Awards as part of a scheme to "exert monopolistic control over the Hollywood trades, awards and advertising markets" and "control the entertainment news disseminated to the general public". The suit cited that the horizontal and vertical integration of the Golden Globe Awards with entertainment trade publications (such as The Hollywood Reporter, Variety and Deadline Hollywood) and advertising sales across these properties (such as "for your consideration" campaigns) gave the combined company undue influence over the awards system in violation of California antitrust law. The suit also alleged that the sale process (which was described as a "sham") was unfairly biased towards Eldridge. The suit seeks $150 million in damages, and the unwinding of the agreement that transferred ownership of the Golden Globes to DCP.

In October 2026, Penske Media sued the Golden Globe Foundation, alleging that the company was using the "Golden Globes" name in means beyond what were originally negotiated with the new ownership.

== Rules ==
=== Eligibility ===
The qualifying eligibility period for all nominations is the calendar year from January 1 through December 31.

Voice-over performances and cameo appearances in which persons play themselves are not eligible from all film and TV acting categories.

Films must be at least 70 minutes and released for at least a seven-day run in the Greater Los Angeles area, starting prior to midnight on December 31. Films can be released in theaters, on pay-per-view, or by digital delivery.

For the Motion Picture – Non-English Language category, films do not need to be released in the United States. At least 51 percent of the dialogue must be in a language other than English, and they must first be released in their country of origin during a 14-month period from November 1 to December 31 prior to the Awards. However, if a film was not released in its country of origin due to censorship, it can still qualify if it had a one-week release in the United States during the qualifying calendar year. There is no limit to the number of submitted films from a given country.

A TV program must air in the United States between the prime time hours of 8 p.m. and 11 p.m. (or 7 p.m. and 11 p.m. on Sundays). A show can air on broadcast television, on basic or premium cable, or by digital delivery; it does not qualify if it is only on pay-per-view or via digital delivery of film. Also, a TV show must either be made in the United States or be a co-production financially and creatively between an American and a foreign production company. Furthermore, reality and non-scripted shows are disqualified.

A film cannot be entered in both the film and TV categories, and instead should be entered based on its original release format. If it was first aired on American television, then it can be entered into the TV categories. If it was released in theaters or on pay-per-view, then it should instead be entered into the film categories. A film festival showing does not count towards disqualifying what would otherwise be a TV program.

Actors in a TV series must appear in at least six episodes during the qualifying calendar year. Actors in a TV film or miniseries must appear in at least five percent of the time in that TV film or miniseries.

=== Nominations and voting ===
Entry forms for films need to be received by the deadline which varies each year, but is typically at the end of October. As of 2024, all films must be uploaded to the Golden Globes screening platform for viewing by all voters. TV programs should be submitted "as early as possible" before the deadline. For TV programs, they too must be made available to be seen by voters by being uploaded to the Golden Globes screening platform. The minimum number of eligible minutes required must be uploaded. For Podcast programs, they must be uploaded to the Golden Globes screening platform by the deadline for viewers to watch/listen.

As of the 2023 ceremony, the HFPA removed exclusive press conferences hosted by the organization—a practice that had contributed to transparency issues.

Ballots to select the nominations are sent to voters in November, along with a "Reminder List" of eligible film and TV programs. Each Golden Globes voter then votes for their top six (or eight in the case of Cinematic & Box Office Achievement) choices in each category, numbering them 6 to 1, with 6 being their top choice. The nominees in each category are then the five selections that receive the most votes. The ranked voting is only used to break ties, with number 6 worth 6 points, number 5 worth 5 points, and so on.

After the nominations are announced on the first or second Monday of December, voters receive the final ballots. The winner in each category is selected from among the nominees by plurality voting. In case of a tie, the winner is the one that had the most votes on the nomination ballot.

As of the 2024 ceremony, the voting body consisted of 310 individuals, including representatives of 76 countries' journalists, and 95 members that were members of the HFPA.

== Ceremony ==
The broadcast of the Golden Globe Awards, broadcast to 167 countries worldwide, generally ranks as the third most-watched awards show each year, behind only the Oscars and the Grammy Awards. Since 2010, it was televised live in all United States time zones. Until Ricky Gervais hosted in 2010, the award ceremony was one of two major Hollywood award ceremonies (the other being the Screen Actors Guild Awards) that did not have a regular host; every year a different presenter introduced the ceremony at the beginning of the broadcast. Gervais returned to host the 68th and 69th Golden Globe Awards the next two years. Tina Fey and Amy Poehler hosted the 70th, 71st and 72nd Golden Globe Awards in 2013 through 2015. The Golden Globe Awards' theme song, which debuted in 2012, was written by Japanese musician and composer Yoshiki.

=== Broadcasting ===
The HFPA had previously held a lucrative broadcasting agreement with NBC, which began televising the Golden Globes ceremony locally in Los Angeles in 1958, then nationally in 1964. However, in 1968, the Federal Communications Commission (FCC) claimed the show "misled the public as to how the winners were determined" (allegations included that winners were determined by lobby; to motivate winners to show up to the awards ceremony winners were informed if they did not attend another winner would be named). The FCC admonished NBC for participating in the scandal. Subsequently, NBC refused to broadcast the ceremony from 1968 until after 1974.

Since 1993, Dick Clark Productions (DCP) had produced the ceremony with NBC as a broadcaster; DCP's involvement came at a time of instability for the Golden Globes, including reduced credibility and having lost its contract with CBS (the interim period saw it contract with cable network TBS to air the ceremony). Enthusiastic over Clark's commitment, the HFPA's contract contained an unusual provision granting DCP the role of producer in perpetuity, provided that it continued to maintain a broadcast rights agreement with NBC.

Due to threats of writers picketing the event as part of the ongoing Writers Guild of America strike, the 65th Golden Globe Awards ceremony was cancelled and replaced by an hour-long press conference to announce the winners. While NBC sought to be the exclusive broadcaster of the press conference, NBC faced conflicts with the HFPA and Dick Clark Productions over the proposed coverage, including a demand for a rights fee, and concerns over plans to have Billy Bush and Nancy O'Dell of NBC's syndicated entertainment news program Access Hollywood serve as presenters. The HFPA subsequently announced that it would not restrict coverage of the press conference by other broadcasters. E! and TV Guide Network (who were typically known for red carpet coverage from major awards shows) both aired coverage of the press conference, as well as CNN. NBC declined to air the conference itself; the ceremony timeslot was filled by a Dateline NBC preview special, an hour-long results special hosted by Bush and O'Dell, and an Access Hollywood post-show also hosted by Bush and O'Dell.

In 2010, Dick Clark Productions reached an extension with NBC through 2018. However, the deal was negotiated without the HFPA's knowledge. The HFPA sued DCP over the deal, as well as claims that the company was attempting to sell digital rights that it did not hold; the HFPA had wanted a new contract that would grant them a larger share of revenue from the telecast. In April 2012, judge Howard Matz upheld the NBC perpetuity clause and ruled in favor of DCP, noting that the HFPA had a history of "unbusinesslike display[s] of misplaced priorities" and "[succumbing] to bouts of pronounced turmoil and personal feuds", in contrast to DCP, which had been "represented by one experienced executive who was adept at dealing fairly and effectively with the often amateurish conduct of HFPA". Matz pointed out examples of the HFPA's enthusiasm over the relationship and their desire to "not get cancelled", such as having disregarded its own bylaws by approving an extension in 2001 without a formal vote. The case was taken to the Ninth Circuit Court of Appeals.

In 2014, Dick Clark Productions and the HFPA reached a settlement; details were not released, but DCP committed to continue its role as producer through at least the end of its current contract with NBC, and to work with the HFPA to "expand the brand with unique and exciting entertainment experiences". NBC held a right of first refusal to renew its contract beyond 2018, but bidding was to be open to other broadcasters; in September 2018, NBC agreed to renew its rights to the Golden Globes through 2027, maintaining the current broadcast arrangement and the involvement of Dick Clark Productions.

In 2019 and 2020, NBC televised the late Sunday afternoon National Football League (NFL) playoff game (which had historically gone to another NFL broadcaster) as a lead-in to the Golden Globes. Because of the large viewership of NFL playoff games, this was intended to boost the Golden Globes' television ratings, which dropped 11% between 2017 and 2018. If the game ever went long, NBC planned to still air the Golden Globes in its entirety on a broadcast delay. The 2021 ceremony was then postponed to February 28 due to the impact of the COVID-19 pandemic on cinema and on television, avoiding the NFL season altogether.

Per the aforementioned 2022 boycott, NBC declined to air the 2022 ceremony, then signed a one-year deal to televise the 2023 ceremony, moving it to a Tuesday evening to avoid conflicting with Sunday Night Football and the 2023 College Football Playoff National Championship. In November 2023, DCP announced a one-year agreement to air the 81st ceremony on CBS and streaming on Paramount+, with the ceremony following CBS's afternoon NFL coverage. In March 2024, DCP announced a five-year agreement with CBS to continue airing the Golden Globes; the agreement also includes rights to the DCP-produced American Music Awards beginning in 2025, which had gone on hiatus after 2022 when its contract with ABC expired. In September 2025, it was announced that CBS would air an additional Golden Globes special—Golden Eve— on the Thursday prior to the ceremony, which will highlight the recipients of the Cecil B. DeMille and Carol Burnett lifetime achievement awards, and feature highlights from the previously non-televised gala.

== Categories ==
=== Motion picture awards ===
- Best Motion Picture – Drama: since 1943 (separated genre in 1951)
- Best Motion Picture – Musical or Comedy: since 1951
- Best Motion Picture – Non-English Language: since 1948
- Best Motion Picture – Animated: since 2006
- Best Cinematic and Box Office Achievement – Motion Picture: since 2024
- Best Director – Motion Picture: since 1943
- Best Actor in a Motion Picture – Drama: since 1943 (separated genre in 1951)
- Best Actor in a Motion Picture – Musical or Comedy: since 1951
- Best Actress in a Motion Picture – Drama: since 1943 (separated genre in 1951)
- Best Actress in a Motion Picture – Musical or Comedy: since 1951
- Best Supporting Actor – Motion Picture: since 1943
- Best Supporting Actress – Motion Picture: since 1943
- Best Screenplay – Motion Picture: since 1947
- Best Score – Motion Picture: since 1947
- Best Song – Motion Picture: since 1961
- Cecil B. DeMille Award for Lifetime Achievement in Motion Pictures: since 1952

=== Television awards ===
- Best Television Series – Drama: since 1961
- Best Television Series – Musical or Comedy: since 1961
- Best Miniseries or Motion Picture – Television: since 1971
- Best Actor in a Television Series – Drama: since 1961
- Best Actor in a Television Series – Musical or Comedy: since 1961
- Best Actor in a Miniseries or Motion Picture – Television: since 1981
- Best Actress in a Television Series – Drama: since 1961
- Best Actress in a Television Series – Musical or Comedy: since 1961
- Best Actress in a Miniseries or Motion Picture – Television: since 1981
- Best Supporting Actor – Series, Miniseries or Motion Picture Made for Television: since 1970
- Best Supporting Actress – Series, Miniseries or Motion Picture Made for Television: since 1970
- Best Stand-Up Comedy Performance – Television: since 2024
- Carol Burnett Award for Lifetime Achievement in Television: since 2019

=== Audio awards ===
- Best Podcast: since 2026

=== Retired awards ===
- Best Documentary • Awarded from 1972 to 1976
- Best English-Language Foreign Motion Picture • Awarded from 1957 to 1973
- New Star of the Year – Actor • Awarded from 1948 to 1983
- New Star of the Year – Actress • Awarded from 1948 to 1983
- Henrietta Award (World Film Favorite – Female) • Awarded from 1950 to 1979
- Henrietta Award (World Film Favorite – Male) • Awarded from 1950 to 1979
- Promoting International Understanding • Awarded from 1945 to 1964
- Best Cinematography – Motion Picture • Awarded from 1948 to 1953, in 1955 and in 1963
- Special Award – Juvenile Performance • Awarded in 1948, 1949, 1953 and 1959

== Superlatives ==
=== Films ===
Films with most wins
Wins	Film	Year (Note: Year of the ceremony.)	Ref.
7	La La Land	2016	
6	Lawrence of Arabia	1962	
6	One Flew Over the Cuckoo's Nest	1975	
6	Midnight Express	1978	
5	All the King's Men	1949	
5	Doctor Zhivago	1965	
5	The Graduate	1967	
5	Love Story	1970	
5	The Godfather	1972	
5	A Star Is Born	1976	
5	Ordinary People	1980	
5	Gandhi	1982	
5	Oppenheimer	2023	

Films with most nominations
Nom.	Film	Year	Ref.
11	Nashville	1975	
10	Emilia Pérez	2024	
9	Cabaret	1972	
9	Barbie	2023	
9	One Battle After Another	2025	

=== Television ===
Television shows with most wins
Wins	Television show	Years	Ref.
9	The Carol Burnett Show	1967–1978	
9	Succession	2018–2023	
8	All in the Family	1971–1979	
8	M*A*S*H	1972–1983	
8	Alice	1976–1985	
8	Sex and the City	1998–2004	
8	The Crown	2016–2023	

Television shows with most nominations
Nom.	Television show	Years	Ref.
32	Cheers	1982–1993	
31	L.A. Law	1986–1994	
30	All in the Family	1971–1979	
30	Will & Grace	1998–2006; 2017–2020	

=== People ===
People with most wins (competitive only)
Wins	Name	Honored professions	Ref.
8	Tom Hanks	Actor, producer	
8	Meryl Streep	Actress	
8	Barbra Streisand	Actress, director, composer	
7	Julie Andrews	Actress	
7	Jane Fonda	Actress	
7	Alan Menken	Composer, songwriter	
7	Paul Newman	Actor, producer, director	
6	Alan Alda	Actor	
6	Nicole Kidman	Actress, producer	
6	Angela Lansbury	Actress	
6	Shirley MacLaine	Actress	
6	Jack Nicholson	Actor	
6	Oliver Stone	Director, screenwriter, producer	

People with most nominations
Nom.	Name	Nominated professions	Ref.
33	Meryl Streep	Actress	
26	John Williams	Composer	
22	Jack Lemmon	Actor	
20	Steven Spielberg	Director, screenwriter, producer	
19	Shirley MacLaine	Actress	
19	Al Pacino	Actor	
18	Nicole Kidman	Actress	
16	Alan Menken	Composer, songwriter	

=== Actors ===
People with multiple acting wins in the same year
Wins	Name	Year	Category and work	Ref.
2	Sigourney Weaver	1989	Best Actress in a Motion Picture – Drama (Gorillas in the Mist); Best Supporting Actress – Motion Picture (Working Girl)	
2	Joan Plowright	1993	Best Supporting Actress – Motion Picture (Enchanted April); Best Supporting Actress – Series, Miniseries or Television Film (Stalin)	
2	Helen Mirren	2007	Best Actress in a Motion Picture – Drama (The Queen); Best Actress – Miniseries or Television Film (Elizabeth I)	
2	Kate Winslet	2009	Best Actress in a Motion Picture – Drama (Revolutionary Road); Best Supporting Actress – Motion Picture (The Reader)	

People with three acting nominations in the same year
Name	Year	Category	Work	Result	Ref.
Jamie Foxx	2005	Best Actor in a Motion Picture – Musical or Comedy	Ray	Won	
Jamie Foxx	2005	Best Supporting Actor – Motion Picture	Collateral	Nominated	
Jamie Foxx	2005	Best Actor – Miniseries or Television Film	Redemption: The Stan Tookie Williams Story	Nominated	
Helen Mirren	2007	Best Actress in a Motion Picture – Drama	The Queen	Won	
Helen Mirren	2007	Best Actress – Miniseries or Television Film	Elizabeth I	Won	
Helen Mirren	2007	Best Actress – Miniseries or Television Film	Prime Suspect: The Final Act	Nominated	

== Ratings ==
Year	Day	Air date (ET)	Network	Household rating		18–49 rating		Viewers (in millions)	Ref.
Year	Day	Air date (ET)	Network	Rating	Share	Rating	Share	Viewers (in millions)	Ref.
1960	Wednesday	March 9	KTTV						
1961	Friday	March 17	KTTV						
1962	Tuesday	March 6	KTTV						
1963	Wednesday	March 6	KTTV						
1964	Wednesday	March 11	KTTV						
1965	Monday	February 8 (Note: The ceremony was broadcast as a special edition of The Andy Williams Show.)	NBC						
1966	Monday	January 31	NBC					~22	
1967	Wednesday	February 15	NBC						
1968	Monday	February 12	NBC						
1969	Untelevised								
1970	Untelevised								
1971	Untelevised								
1972	Untelevised								
1973	Sunday	January 28	Metromedia						
1974	Saturday	January 26	Metromedia						
1975	Saturday	January 25	Metromedia						
1976	Saturday	January 24	Metromedia						
1977	Saturday	January 29	Metromedia						
1978	Sunday	January 29	NBC	19.4	30				
1979	Untelevised								
1980	Saturday	January 26	KHJ-TV						
1981	Saturday	January 31	CBS	15.9	26				
1982	Saturday	January 30	CBS	13.6	24				
1983	Monday	January 31	Syndicated						
1984	Sunday	January 29	Syndicated						
1985	Sunday	January 27	Syndicated						
1986	Friday	January 24	Syndicated						
1987	Saturday	January 31	Syndicated						
1988	Saturday	January 23	Syndicated						
1989	Saturday	January 28	TBS						
1990	Saturday	January 20	TBS						
1991	Saturday	January 19	TBS						
1992	Saturday	January 18	TBS						
1993	Monday	January 25	TBS						
1994	Saturday	January 22	TBS	2.9				3.90	
1995	Saturday	January 21	TBS	2.5				3.64	
1996	Sunday	January 21	NBC	12.9	20			18.47	
1997	Sunday	January 19	NBC	13.4	21			19.87	
1998	Sunday	January 18	NBC	15.9	25	10.8	25	24.34	
1999	Sunday	January 24	NBC	16.1	24	10.2	23	24.18	
2000	Sunday	January 23	NBC	15.0	22			22.11	
2001	Sunday	January 21	NBC	14.6	21	9.9	22	22.49	
2002	Sunday	January 20	NBC	14.9	23	9.5	22	23.45	
2003	Sunday	January 19	NBC	13.4	20	7.8	17	20.10	
2004	Sunday	January 25	NBC	16.9	25	9.9	23	26.80	
2005	Sunday	January 16	NBC	11.3	17	5.7	13	16.85	
2006	Monday	January 16	NBC	12.5	18	6.3	15	18.77	
2007	Monday	January 15	NBC	13.2	20	6.5	15	20.04	
2008	Bulk press conference due to WGA strike								
2009	Sunday	January 11	NBC	9.3	14	4.9	12	14.86	
2010	Sunday	January 17	NBC	10.0	16	5.5	14	16.98	
2011	Sunday	January 16	NBC	10.0	16	5.2	14	17.00	
2012	Sunday	January 15	NBC	10.2	16	5.0	12	16.85	
2013	Sunday	January 13	NBC	11.8	18	6.4	15	19.69	
2014	Sunday	January 12	NBC	12.4	19	6.5	15	20.87	
2015	Sunday	January 11	NBC	11.4	18	5.8	16	19.31	
2016	Sunday	January 10	NBC	11.1	18	5.5	16	18.51	
2017	Sunday	January 8	NBC	11.6	19	5.6	17	20.02	
2018	Sunday	January 7	NBC	11.2	19	5.0	17	19.01	
2019	Sunday	January 6	NBC	10.7	20	5.2	20	18.61	
2020	Sunday	January 5	NBC	10.7	21	4.7	21	18.32	
2021	Sunday	February 28	NBC			1.5	10	6.91	
2022	Untelevised								
2023	Tuesday	January 10	NBC / Peacock			1.1		6.3	
2024	Sunday	January 7	CBS / Paramount+					9.47	
2025	Sunday	January 5	CBS / Paramount+					9.2	

== Scandals and criticism ==
Since the late 1950s, the HFPA had been racked by scandals and controversies. The organization had been criticized for the small size of its membership, the quality of the members, its exclusion of serious cinema journalists, and their closeness to the movie industry and stars. The Golden Globes under the HFPA were also accused of being bought or bartered, with the HFPA's members having been easily swayed by high-priced gifts and access offered by studios, production companies, and stars.

=== Henry Gris resignation ===
Former HFPA president Henry Gris resigned from the board in 1958 claiming that "certain awards are being given more or less as favors" with others querying why so many winners were represented by one public relations firm.

=== FCC broadcast ban ===
The FCC imposed a ban on NBC's broadcast of the Golden Globes after the February 1968 ceremony. Movie critic Rex Reed, in a contemporary article about the broadcast, wrote:

NBC's telcast of the Foreign Press Association's 25th annual Golden Globe Awards had to be seen to be disbelieved. The Federal Communications Commission have sent lawyers to have it investigated. But award-giving, pointless as it is, is still big business, and it also gives viewers a chance to see their favorite stars make fools of themselves in public, so the Golden Globes were back, minus some of their sponsors, who backed out at the last minute....

Just last week Newsweek reported denials from the Foreign Press Association that its members give awards to the stars who throw the biggest feeds. "We are not influenced by a glass of champagne," snapped [HFPA President Howard] Luft, "Kirk Douglas threw a party last year, and what did he win? Nothing."

This year there was even a special category called the Cecil B. DeMille Humanitarian Award. Who won? You guessed it. Kirk Douglas.

The FCC was spurred to action because the public had been misled as to how the awards were actually made. Golden Globe broadcast advertisers determined Golden Globe winners and the HFPA pressured nominees to attend the award ceremony by threatening to award the Golden Globe won by a non-attendee to a losing nominee who was at the ceremony. The ban lasted until 1974.

After the ban, NBC once again broadcast the awards ceremony, but it terminated its contract with the HFPA after the Pia Zadora scandal of 1982 (see below).

=== Pia Zadora awarded "New Star of the Year in a Motion Picture" in 1982 ===
In 1982, Pia Zadora won a Golden Globe in the category "New Star of the Year in a Motion Picture" for her performance in Butterfly, over such competition as Elizabeth McGovern (Ragtime) and Kathleen Turner (Body Heat). Accusations were made that the Foreign Press Association members had been bought off. Zadora's husband, multimillionaire Meshulam Riklis, flew voting members to his casino, the Riviera Hotel in Las Vegas, which gave the appearance that they voted for Zadora to repay this. Riklis also invited voting members to his house for a lavish lunch and a showing of the film. He also spent a great deal on advertising. Furthermore, Zadora had made her film debut some 17 years earlier as a child performer in Santa Claus Conquers the Martians.

=== 2011 payola charges ===
In 2011, three days before the Golden Globe Awards telecast, publicist Michael Russell filed a $2 million lawsuit alleging that HFPA President Philip Berk terminated Russell and his partner's contract after the 2010 broadcast because they raised ethical concerns over payola with him, including allegations that HFPA members took bribes for nominations and awards. The lawsuit alleged that HFPA members "abuse their positions and engage in unethical and potentially unlawful deals and arrangements which amount to a 'payola' scheme." The HFPA denied the allegations, claiming they were fabrications made up by a disgruntled ex-employee. The lawsuit was later settled.

=== Burlesque and The Tourist for Best Musical/Comedy nominations in 2011 ===
The nominations for the 2011 Golden Globes drew initial skepticism, as the Hollywood Foreign Press Association nominated The Tourist in its Best Musical/Comedy categories, even though it was originally advertised as a spy thriller, along with being one of the most panned films of the season. Host Ricky Gervais even jokingly asked the main star of the film, Johnny Depp, if he had seen it. Depp's co-star Angelina Jolie reportedly had personally lobbied HFPA members, resulting in a nomination in a category the film did not belong in. Rumors then surfaced that Sony, the distributor of The Tourist, had influenced Globes voters with an all-expenses-paid trip to Las Vegas, culminating in a concert by Cher. The lobbying by Sony also resulted in a Best Musical/Comedy nod for Cher's badly-reviewed movie Burlesque.

=== Asian films excluded from Best Motion Picture categories ===
In 2020, the HFPA received widespread criticism for nominating Asian and Asian-American films, such as The Farewell, Parasite, and Minari, for Best Foreign Language Film while excluding them from the Best Motion Picture categories. The decision to categorize Minari as a foreign-language film, despite having an exclusively American production team and setting, was heavily condemned by many actors and filmmakers of Asian descent. While HFPA rules stipulate that a film must have at least 50% English dialogue to be nominated for the Best Drama or Comedy/Musical categories, critics noted that the films Inglourious Basterds and Babel did not meet the 50% threshold but were still nominated for the Best Motion Picture categories, prompting accusations of anti-Asian racism.

=== Black representation ===
In the 2020s, the HFPA began to face criticism for the ethical standards of its operations—including allegations that the organization lacked accountability, and that there was a lack of Black representation among its members. Calls for reform in response to these issues resulted in the 79th Golden Globe Awards being boycotted by its broadcaster and other production companies; as a result, the ceremony was held as a non-televised, private event. A televised ceremony returned the following year.

== See also ==
- Golden Globe Foundation
- List of American television awards
- List of film awards
- List of Golden Globe Awards ceremonies
- List of Golden Globe Award winners
- List of Golden Globe Award winning films
- List of Indian Golden Globe Award winners and nominees
