= 1st Golden Globe Awards =

Film award ceremony in 1944

- Date: January 20, 1944
- Site: 20th Century Fox studios

Highlights
- Best Picture: The Song of Bernadette
- Most awards: The Song of Bernadette (3)

The 1st Golden Globe Awards, honoring the best achievements in 1943 filmmaking, were held late on January 20, 1944, at the 20th Century Fox studios in Los Angeles, California.

== Winners ==
=== Best Picture ===
- The Song of Bernadette

=== Best Actor in a Leading Role ===
- Paul Lukas – Watch on the Rhine as Kurt Muller

=== Best Actress in a Leading Role ===
- Jennifer Jones – The Song of Bernadette as Bernadette

=== Best Performance by an Actor in a Supporting Role in a Motion Picture ===
- Akim Tamiroff – For Whom the Bell Tolls as Pablo

=== Best Performance by an Actress in a Supporting Role in a Motion Picture ===
- Katina Paxinou – For Whom the Bell Tolls as Pilar

=== Best Director-Motion Picture ===
- Henry King – The Song of Bernadette
Golden Globe winners
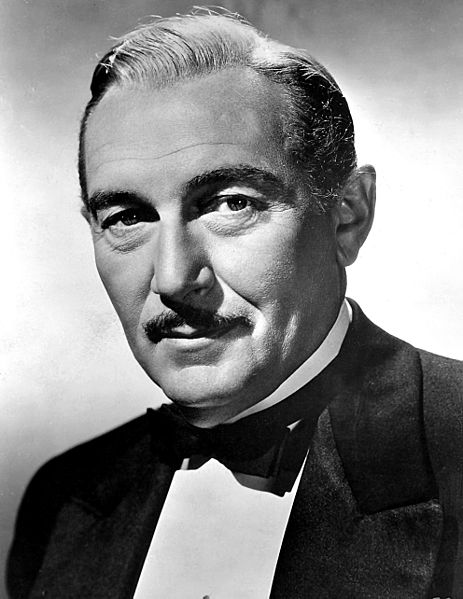
Paul Lukas, Best Actor in a Leading Role winner.

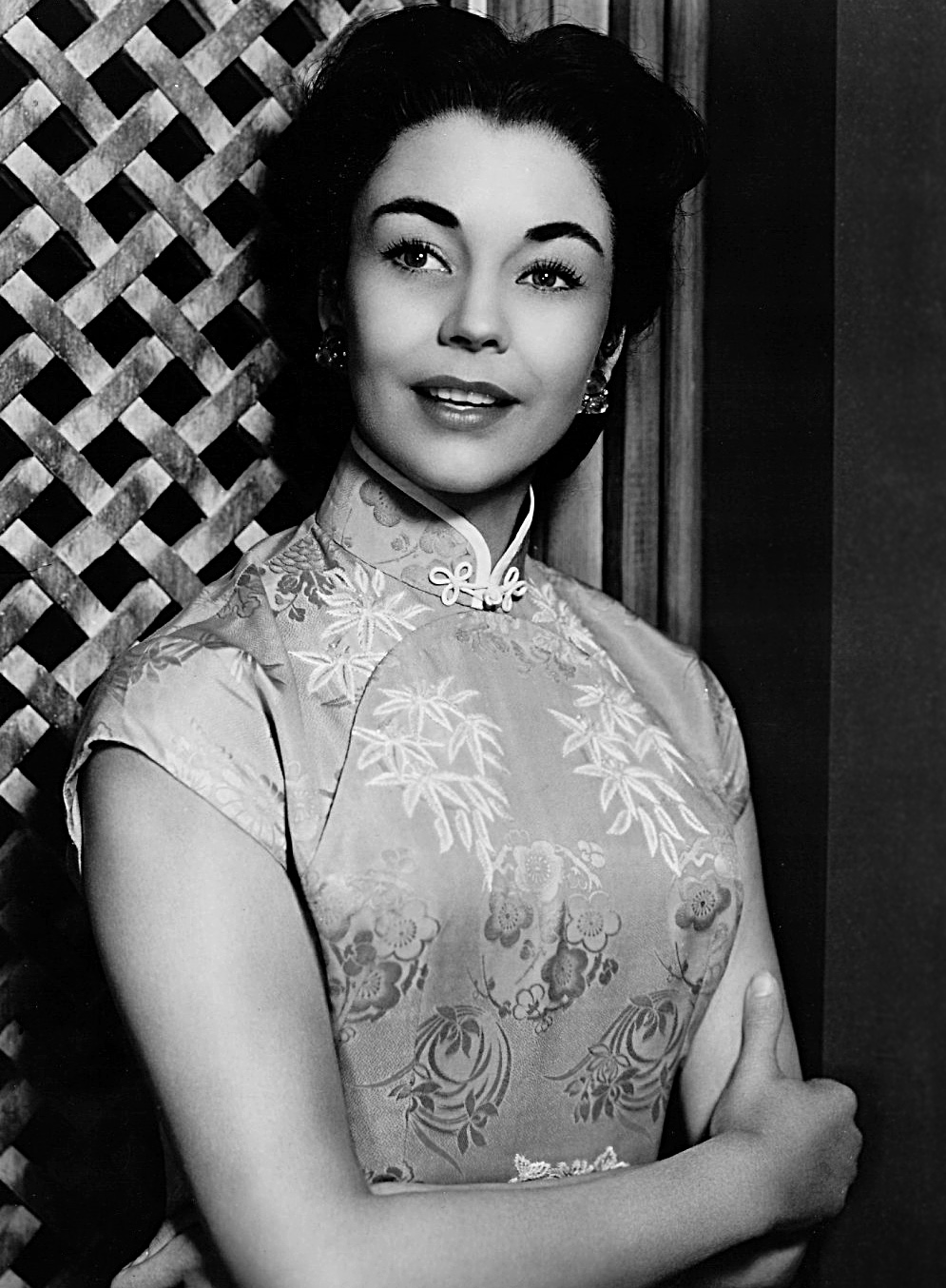
Jennifer Jones, Best Actress in a Leading Role winner.

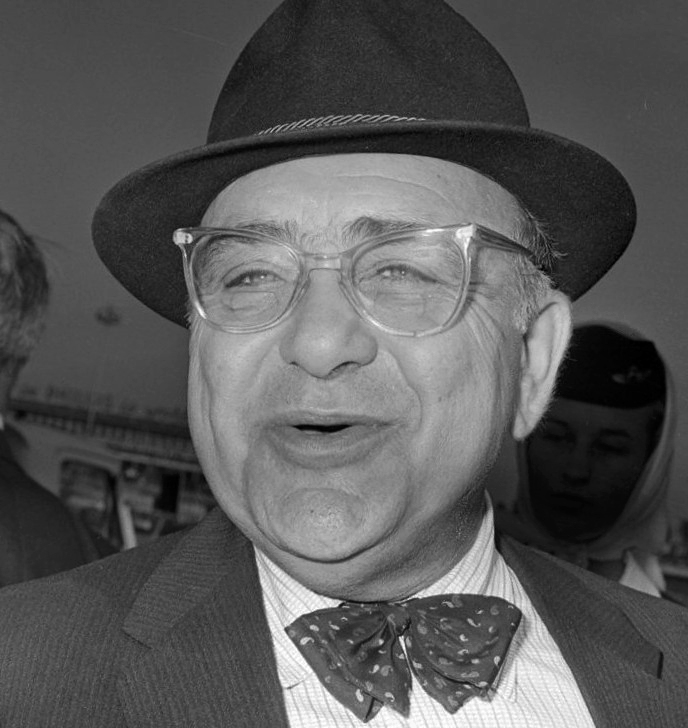
Akim Tamiroff, Best Performance by an Actor in a Supporting Role winner.

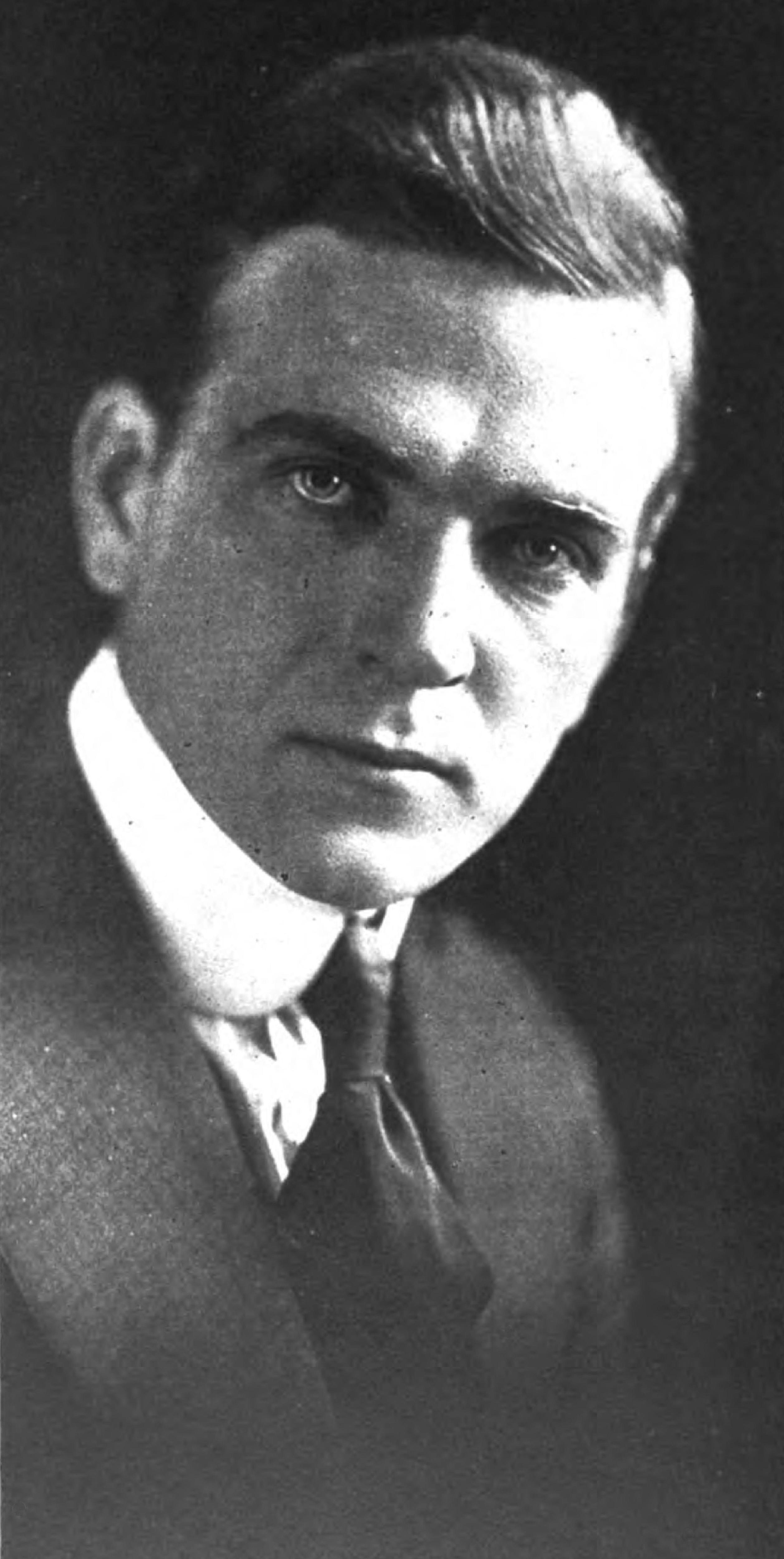
Henry King, Best Director winner

== Comparison with the Academy Awards ==
The 16th Academy Awards, presented six weeks later, on March 2, 1944, featured among its nominations the same six, three of which were also winners — Best Actor: Paul Lukas, Best Actress: Jennifer Jones and Best Supporting Actress: Katina Paxinou.

== See also ==
- Hollywood Foreign Press Association
- 16th Academy Awards
- 1943 in film
