= People's Choice Award for Favorite Female Artist =

Pop culture award

People's Choice Awards for Favorite Female Artist
- Country: United States
- Presented by: People's Choice Awards
- First award: 1975
- Currently held by: Taylor Swift (2024)

Highlights
- Most wins: Reba McEntire (6)
- Most nominations: Taylor Swift (11)
- Website: pca.eonline.com

The People's Choice Award for Best Female Artist was first presented in 2000. Reba McEntire has won this award six times making her the most awarded artist in the category. Taylor Swift is the most nominated artist in the category with ten nominations. From 1975 to 1998 only winners were announced. Starting from 1999 multiple nominees were revealed before the winner was announced during the year's ceremony.

== Winners and nominees ==
Year	Recipient	Nominees
2024	Taylor Swift	Beyoncé; Miley Cyrus; Doja Cat; Karol G; Nicki Minaj; Olivia Rodrigo; Lainey Wilson
2022	Taylor Swift	Beyoncé; Camila Cabello; Doja Cat; Lady Gaga; Lizzo; Megan Thee Stallion; Nicki Minaj
2021	Adele	Billie Eilish; Cardi B; Doja Cat; Halsey; Megan Thee Stallion; Olivia Rodrigo; Saweetie
2020	Ariana Grande	Billie Eilish; Cardi B; Dua Lipa; Lady Gaga; Megan Thee Stallion; Miley Cyrus; Taylor Swift
2019	Billie Eilish	Ariana Grande; Camila Cabello; Cardi B; Halsey; Miley Cyrus; Pink; Taylor Swift
2018	Nicki Minaj	Ariana Grande; Cardi B; Camila Cabello; Taylor Swift
2017	Britney Spears	Adele; Ariana Grande; Beyoncé; Rihanna
2016	Taylor Swift	Lana Del Rey; Selena Gomez; Demi Lovato; Madonna
2015	Taylor Swift	Beyoncé; Iggy Azalea; Katy Perry; Sia
2014	Demi Lovato	Selena Gomez; Pink; Katy Perry; Britney Spears
2013	Katy Perry	Adele; Carrie Underwood; Pink; Taylor Swift
2012	Katy Perry	Adele; Lady Gaga; Beyoncé; Taylor Swift
2011	Katy Perry	Lady Gaga; Carrie Underwood; Pink; Taylor Swift
2010	Taylor Swift	Pink; Beyoncé; Carrie Underwood; Britney Spears
2000	Shania Twain	Céline Dion; Britney Spears
1999	Celine Dion	Reba McEntire; Shania Twain
1998	Whitney Houston; Reba McEntire	
1997	Reba McEntire	
1996	Reba McEntire	
1995	Reba McEntire	
1994	Reba McEntire	
1993	Whitney Houston	
1992	Reba McEntire	
1991	Paula Abdul	
1990	Paula Abdul	
1989	Whitney Houston	
1988	Whitney Houston	
1987	Whitney Houston	
1986	Madonna	
1985	Barbara Mandrell	
1984	Not awarded	
1983	Not awarded	
1982	Barbara Mandrell	
1981	Pat Benatar	
1980	Not awarded	
1979	Olivia Newton-John	
1978	Not awarded	
1977	Olivia Newton-John	
1976	Not awarded	
1975	Lynn Anderson; Olivia Newton-John	

== Category facts ==
=== Most wins ===
Rank	Artist	Award Won	Years won
1.	Reba McEntire	6	1992, 1994, 1995, 1996, 1997 and 1998
2.	Whitney Houston	5	1987, 1988, 1989, 1993 and 1998
2.	Taylor Swift	5	2010, 2015, 2016, 2022 and 2024
4.	Katy Perry	3	2011, 2012 and 2013
4.	Olivia Newton-John	3	1975, 1977 and 1979

=== Most nominations ===
Rank	Artist	Award Nominations
1.	Taylor Swift	10
2.	Katy Perry	5
3.	Britney Spears	4
3.	Beyoncé	4
3.	Ariana Grande	4
4.	Pink	3
4.	Adele	3
4.	Cardi B	3
4.	Carrie Underwood	3
4.	Lady Gaga	3
5.	Miley Cyrus	2
5.	Billie Eilish	2
5.	Demi Lovato	2
5.	Selena Gomez	2
5.	Camila Cabello	2
5.	Nicki Minaj	2
