= List of awards and nominations received by Barbra Streisand =

Barbra Streisand awards and nominations
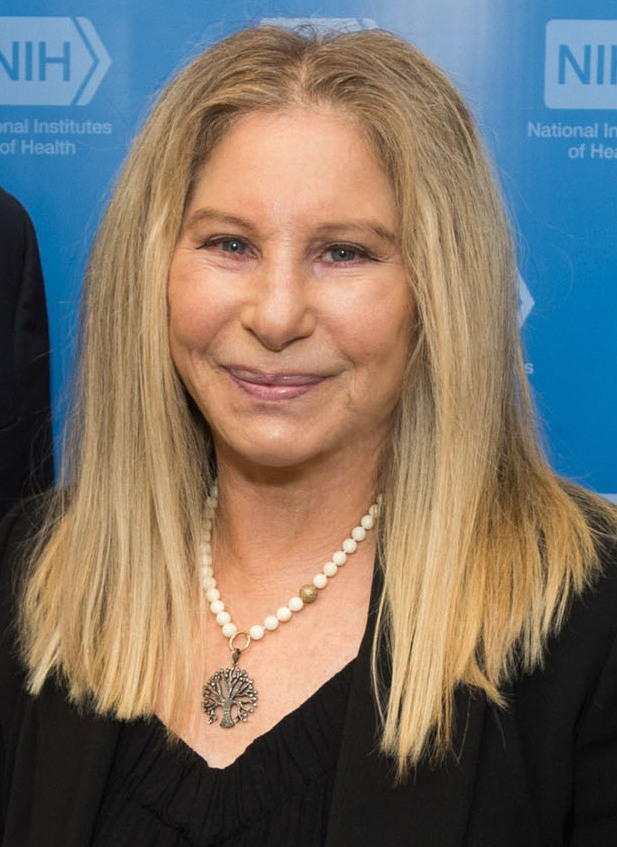
- Barbra Streisand in 2018
Awards and nominations
Award	Wins	Nominations
Academy Awards	2	5
Actor Awards	1	1
American Film Institute	1	1
British Academy Film Awards	0	3
Directors Guild of America Awards	1	3
Primetime Emmy Awards	4	8
Daytime Emmy Awards	1	1
Golden Globe Awards	9	19
Grammy Awards	10	49
Peabody Awards	3	3
Tony Awards	1	3

Totals (Note: Certain award groups do not simply award one winner. They acknowledge several different recipients, have runners-up, and have third place. Since this is a specific recognition and is different from losing an award, runner-up mentions are considered wins in this award tally. For simplification and to avoid errors, each award in this list has been presumed to have had a prior nomination.)
- Wins: 95
- Nominations: 191

Barbra Streisand is an American singer, actress, songwriter and filmmaker. With a career spanning seven decades, she has achieved success in multiple fields of entertainment. She has won two Academy Awards, ten Grammy Awards, four Primetime Emmy Awards, one Daytime Emmy Award, a Special Tony Award, three Peabody Awards and nine Golden Globe Awards, which ties her as the most-awarded artist of the Golden Globe Awards. She is one of the few entertainers who have been awarded an EGOT (Emmy, Grammy, Oscar, and Tony), however in non-competitive categories.

Streisand began her career by performing in nightclubs and Broadway theatres in the early 1960s. She was nominated for Tony Awards for her performances in I Can Get It for You Wholesale (1962) and Funny Girl (1964). Following her guest appearances on various television shows, she signed to Columbia Records and released her debut album, The Barbra Streisand Album (1963). It won two Grammy Awards, including Album of the Year. Through the next years, she received Grammy Awards for albums People (1964) and My Name Is Barbra (1965). Her first television special, My Name Is Barbra (1965), earned her the Primetime Emmy Award and the Peabody Award. In the 1960s, Streisand ventured into film. She starred in the critically acclaimed Funny Girl (1968), for which she won the Academy Award for Best Actress and the Golden Globe Award for Best Actress in a Motion Picture – Musical or Comedy. In 1970, she won the Special Tony Award for the Star of the Decade. She received her second Academy Award acting nomination for The Way We Were (1973).

Her role in A Star Is Born (1976) earned her the Golden Globe Award for Best Actress in a Motion Picture – Musical or Comedy. For "Evergreen (Love Theme from A Star Is Born)", she received the Academy Award for Best Original Song, the Golden Globe Award for Best Original Song and two Grammy Awards, including Song of the Year. In the 1980s, she received additional Grammy Awards for "Guilty" (1980) and The Broadway Album (1985). For her directorial debut, Yentl (1983), she became the first female winner of the Golden Globe Award for Best Director. Her second self-directed film, The Prince of Tides (1991), earned her a nomination for the Academy Award for Best Picture. For the television special Barbra Streisand: The Concert (1994) she received two Primetime Emmy Awards, the Peabody Award and the Directors Guild of America Award for Outstanding Directorial Achievement in Musical Variety. She also received the Peabody Award for the television film Serving in Silence: The Margarethe Cammermeyer Story (1995), the Primetime Emmy Award for the television special Barbra Streisand: Timeless (2001) and the Daytime Emmy Award for the documentary film Reel Models: The First Women of Film (2000).

She has received multiple numerous honorary accolades including Hollywood Walk of Fame (1976), Grammy Legend Award (1992), Grammy Lifetime Achievement Award (1995), Golden Globe Cecil B. DeMille Award (2000), AFI Life Achievement Award (2001), Kennedy Center Honors (2008), MusiCares Person of the Year (2011),, Screen Actors Guild Life Achievement Award (2024) and Honorary Palme d'Or (2026). She was presented with the National Medal of Arts in 2000 and the Presidential Medal of Freedom in 2015.

Key
†	Indicates non-competitive categories

== Major associations ==
=== Academy Awards ===
Year	Category	Work	Result	Ref.
1969	Best Actress	Funny Girl	Won (Note: Tied with Katharine Hepburn for The Lion in Winter.)	
1974	Best Actress	The Way We Were	Nominated	
1977	Best Original Song	"Evergreen (Love Theme from A Star Is Born)"	Won	
1992	Best Picture	The Prince of Tides	Nominated	
1997	Best Original Song	"I Finally Found Someone"	Nominated	

=== Actor Awards ===
Year	Category	Work	Result	Ref.
2024	Screen Actors Guild Life Achievement Award †	—N/a	Won	

=== American Film Institute ===
Year	Category	Work	Result	Ref.
2001	AFI Life Achievement Award †	—N/a	Won	

=== BAFTA Awards ===
Year	Category	Work	Result	Ref.
British Academy Film Awards
1970	Best Actress in a Leading Role	Funny Girl and Hello, Dolly!	Nominated	
1975	Best Actress in a Leading Role	The Way We Were	Nominated	
1978	Anthony Asquith Award for Original Film Music	A Star Is Born	Nominated	

=== Directors Guild of America Awards ===
Year	Category	Work	Result	Ref.
1992	Outstanding Directorial Achievement in Theatrical Feature Film	The Prince of Tides	Nominated	
1995	Outstanding Directorial Achievement in Musical Variety	Barbra Streisand: The Concert	Won (Note: Shared with Dwight Hemion.)	
2002	Outstanding Directorial Achievement in Musical Variety	Barbra Streisand: Timeless	Nominated (Note: Shared with Don Mischer.)	

=== Emmy Awards ===
Year	Category	Work	Result	Ref.
Daytime Emmy Awards
2001	Outstanding Special Class Special	Reel Models: The First Women of Film	Won	
Primetime Emmy Awards
1964	Outstanding Performance in a Variety or Music Program or Series	The Judy Garland Show	Nominated	
1965	Outstanding Individual Achievement in Entertainment – Actors and Performers	My Name Is Barbra	Won	
1969	Outstanding Variety or Musical Program	Barbra Streisand: A Happening In Central Park	Nominated	
1974	Outstanding Comedy-Variety, Variety or Music Special	Barbra Streisand...and Other Musical Instruments	Nominated	
1995	Outstanding Made for Television Movie	Serving in Silence: The Margarethe Cammermeyer Story	Nominated	
1995	Outstanding Variety, Music or Comedy Special	Barbra Streisand: The Concert	Won	
1995	Outstanding Individual Achievement in Directing for a Variety or Music Program	Barbra Streisand: The Concert	Nominated	
1995	Outstanding Individual Performance in a Variety or Music Program	Barbra Streisand: The Concert	Won	
2001	Outstanding Individual Performance in a Variety or Music Program	Barbra Streisand: Timeless	Won	

=== Golden Globe Awards ===
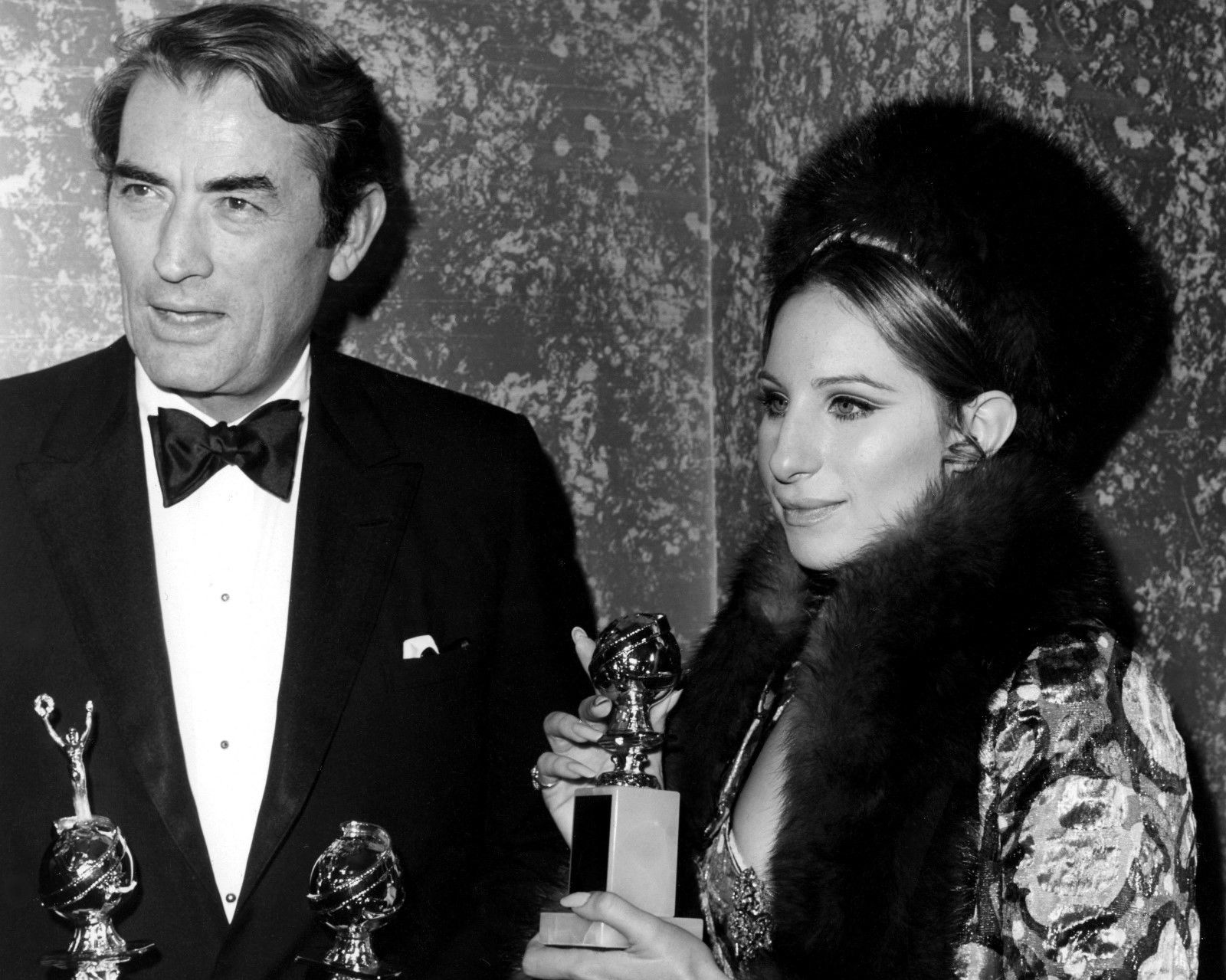
Gregory Peck and Streisand, holding her award for Best Actress – Motion Picture Musical or Comedy for Funny Girl, at the 26th Golden Globe Awards

Year	Category	Work	Result	Ref.
1969	Best Actress – Motion Picture Musical or Comedy	Funny Girl	Won	
1970	Best Actress – Motion Picture Musical or Comedy	Hello, Dolly!	Nominated	
1970	World Film Favorites	—N/a	Won	
1971	World Film Favorites	—N/a	Won	
1971	Best Actress – Motion Picture Musical or Comedy	The Owl and the Pussycat	Nominated	
1974	Best Actress – Motion Picture Drama	The Way We Were	Nominated	
1975	World Film Favorites	—N/a	Won	
1976	Best Actress – Motion Picture Musical or Comedy	Funny Lady	Nominated	
1977	Best Actress – Motion Picture Musical or Comedy	A Star Is Born	Won	
1977	Best Original Song	"Evergreen"	Won	
1978	World Film Favorites	—N/a	Won	
1984	Best Actress – Motion Picture Musical or Comedy	Yentl	Nominated	
1984	Best Director	Yentl	Won	
1988	Best Actress – Motion Picture Drama	Nuts	Nominated	
1992	Best Director	The Prince of Tides	Nominated	
1996	Best Miniseries or Television Film	Serving in Silence: The Margarethe Cammermeyer Story	Nominated	
1997	Best Actress – Motion Picture Musical or Comedy	The Mirror Has Two Faces	Nominated	
1997	Best Original Song	"I Finally Found Someone"	Nominated	
2000	Cecil B. DeMille Award †	—N/a	Won	

=== Grammy Awards ===
Year	Category	Work	Result	Ref.
1964	Album of the Year	The Barbra Streisand Album	Won	
1964	Best Vocal Performance, Female	The Barbra Streisand Album	Won	
1964	Record of the Year	"Happy Days Are Here Again"	Nominated	
1965	Album of the Year	People	Nominated	
1965	Best Vocal Performance, Female	People	Won	
1965	Record of the Year	"People"	Nominated	
1966	Album of the Year	My Name Is Barbra	Nominated	
1966	Best Vocal Performance, Female	My Name Is Barbra	Won	
1967	Album of the Year	Color Me Barbra	Nominated	
1967	Best Vocal Performance, Female	Color Me Barbra	Nominated	
1969	Best Contemporary-Pop Vocal Performance, Female	Funny Girl	Nominated	
1973	Best Pop Vocal Performance, Female	"Sweet Inspiration"/"Where You Lead"	Nominated	
1977	Best Classical Vocal Soloist Performance	Classical Barbra	Nominated	
1978	Record of the Year	"Evergreen (Love Theme from A Star Is Born)"	Nominated	
1978	Song of the Year	"Evergreen (Love Theme from A Star Is Born)"	Won	
1978	Best Pop Vocal Performance, Female	"Evergreen (Love Theme from A Star Is Born)"	Won	
1978	Best Original Score Written For a Motion Picture or a Television Special	A Star Is Born	Nominated	
1979	Best Pop Vocal Performance, Female	"You Don't Bring Me Flowers"	Nominated	
1980	Record of the Year	"You Don't Bring Me Flowers" (with Neil Diamond)	Nominated	
1980	Best Pop Vocal Performance by a Duo, Group or Chorus	"You Don't Bring Me Flowers" (with Neil Diamond)	Nominated	
1981	Album of the Year	Guilty	Nominated	
1981	Record of the Year	"Woman in Love"	Nominated	
1981	Best Pop Vocal Performance, Female	"Woman in Love"	Nominated	
1981	Best Pop Performance by a Duo or Group with Vocal	"Guilty" (with Barry Gibb)	Won	
1987	Album of the Year	The Broadway Album	Nominated	
1987	Best Pop Vocal Performance, Female	The Broadway Album	Won	
1988	Best Pop Vocal Performance, Female	One Voice	Nominated	
1988	Best Performance Music Video	One Voice	Nominated	
1992	Best Traditional Pop Performance	"Warm All Over"	Nominated	
1992	Grammy Legend Award †	—N/a	Won	
1994	Best Traditional Pop Vocal Performance	Back to Broadway	Nominated	
1994	Best Pop Performance by a Duo or Group with Vocal	"The Music of the Night" (with Michael Crawford)	Nominated	
1995	Best Traditional Pop Vocal Performance	The Concert	Nominated	
1995	Best Female Pop Vocal Performance	"Ordinary Miracles"	Nominated	
1995	Grammy Lifetime Achievement Award †	—N/a	Won	
1998	Best Pop Collaboration with Vocals	"Tell Him" (with Celine Dion)	Nominated	
1998	Best Pop Collaboration with Vocals	"I Finally Found Someone" (with Bryan Adams)	Nominated	
2001	Best Traditional Pop Vocal Album	Timeless: Live in Concert	Nominated	
2003	Best Traditional Pop Vocal Album	Christmas Memories	Nominated	
2004	Best Traditional Pop Vocal Album	The Movie Album	Nominated	
2008	Best Traditional Pop Vocal Album	Live in Concert 2006	Nominated	
2011	Best Traditional Pop Vocal Album	Love Is the Answer	Nominated	
2012	Best Traditional Pop Vocal Album	What Matters Most	Nominated	
2015	Best Traditional Pop Vocal Album	Partners	Nominated	
2017	Best Traditional Pop Vocal Album	Encore: Movie Partners Sing Broadway	Nominated	
2019	Best Traditional Pop Vocal Album	The Music...The Mem'ries...The Magic!	Nominated	
2020	Best Traditional Pop Vocal Album	Walls	Nominated	
2025	Best Audio Book, Narration & Storytelling Recording	My Name Is Barbra	Nominated	
2026	Best Traditional Pop Vocal Album	The Secret of Life: Partners, Volume Two	Nominated	

=== Peabody Awards ===
Year	Category	Work	Result	Ref.
1965	Area of Excellence †	My Name Is Barbra	Won (Note: Shared with NBC, CBS, Frank Sinatra and Julie Andrews for their television specials.)	
1994	Area of Excellence †	Barbra Streisand: The Concert	Won (Note: Shared with J.E.G. Productions and HBO.)	
1995	Area of Excellence †	Serving in Silence: The Margarethe Cammermeyer Story	Won (Note: As an executive producer. Shared with NBC, Barwood Films, Storyline Productions, Trillium Productions and TriStar Television.)	

=== Tony Awards ===
Year	Category	Work	Result	Ref.
1962	Best Featured Actress in a Musical	I Can Get It for You Wholesale	Nominated	
1964	Best Actress in a Musical	Funny Girl	Nominated	
1970	Star of the Decade †	—N/a	Won	

== Miscellaneous awards ==
Awards and nominations received by Barbra Streisand
Award	Year (Note: The listed year refers to the date of the ceremony.)	Category	Work	Result	Ref.
Academy of Achievement	1992	Golden Plate †	—N/a	Won	
AIDS Project Los Angeles	1992	Commitment to Life Award †	—N/a	Won	
American Civil Liberties Union	1992	Bill of Rights Award †	—N/a	Won	
American Friends of the Hebrew University	1984	Scopus Award †	—N/a	Won	
American Guild of Variety Artists Awards	1970	Entertainer of the Year	—N/a	Won	
American Guild of Variety Artists Awards	1971	Female Singing Star of the Year	—N/a	Won	
American Guild of Variety Artists Awards	1978	Female Singing Star of the Year	—N/a	Won	
American Guild of Variety Artists Awards	1981	Female Singing Star of the Year	—N/a	Won	
American Music Awards	1975	Favorite Pop/Rock Song	"The Way We Were"	Nominated	
American Music Awards	1975	Favorite Pop/Rock Female Artist	—N/a	Nominated	
American Music Awards	1978	Favorite Pop/Rock Female Artist	—N/a	Nominated	
American Music Awards	1979	Favorite Pop/Rock Female Artist	—N/a	Nominated	
American Music Awards	1980	Favorite Pop/Rock Female Artist	—N/a	Nominated	
American Music Awards	1981	Favorite Pop/Rock Female Artist	—N/a	Nominated	
American Society of Cinematographers Awards	2015	Board of Directors Award †	—N/a	Won	
American Society of Composers, Authors and Publishers (ASCAP)	1969	ASCAP Pied Piper Award †	—N/a	Won	
American Society of Composers, Authors and Publishers (ASCAP)	1994	ASCAP Harry Chapin Humanitarian Award †	—N/a	Won	
Anti-Defamation League	1977	Woman of Achievement †	—N/a	Won	
ASCAP Film and Television Music Awards	1988	Most Performed Feature Film Standards	"Evergreen (Love Theme from A Star Is Born)"	Won	
ASCAP Film and Television Music Awards	1998	Most Performed Songs from Motion Pictures	"I Finally Found Someone"	Won	
ASCAP Pop Music Awards	1986	Most Performed Songs of the Last Decade	"Evergreen (Love Theme from A Star Is Born)"	Won	
ASCAP Pop Music Awards	1998	Most Performed Songs	"I Finally Found Someone"	Won	
Audie Awards	2025	Audiobook of the Year	My Name Is Barbra	Won	
Audie Awards	2025	Autobiography or Memoir	My Name Is Barbra	Won	
Brit Awards	1983	Best Selling Album	Love Songs	Won	
CableACE Award	1986	Performance in a Music Special	Putting It Together: The Making of the Broadway Album	Nominated	
CableACE Award	1987	Music Special	Barbra Streisand: One Voice	Nominated	
CableACE Award	1987	Performance in a Music Special	Barbra Streisand: One Voice	Nominated	
CableACE Award	1995	Music Special	Barbra Streisand: The Concert	Nominated	
CableACE Award	1995	Performance in a Music Special or Series	Barbra Streisand: The Concert	Won	
CableACE Award	1995	Directing a Music Special or Series	Barbra Streisand: The Concert	Won	
Cannes Film Festival	2026	Honorary Palme d'Or †	—N/a	Won	
Cedars-Sinai Medical Center	2011	Board of Governors Humanitarian Award †	—N/a	Won	
CINE Golden Eagle	2001	People, Places and Events	Reel Models: The First Women of Film	Won	
Cue	1963	Entertainer of the Year †	—N/a	Nominated	
David di Donatello	1969	Best Foreign Actress	Funny Girl	Won (Note: Tied with Mia Farrow for Rosemary's Baby.)	
David di Donatello	1974	Best Foreign Actress	The Way We Were	Won (Note: Tied with Tatum O'Neal for Paper Moon.)	
David di Donatello	1984	Best Foreign Producer	Yentl	Nominated	
David di Donatello	1988	Best Foreign Actress	Nuts	Nominated	
Dwight D. Opperman Foundation	2023	Justice Ruth Bader Ginsburg Woman of Leadership Award †	—N/a	Won	
Edison Awards	1964	International Vocalist	The Barbra Streisand Album	Won	
Edison Awards	1986	Musical / Film	The Broadway Album	Won	
Edison Awards	1988	International Vocalist	Barbra Streisand: One Voice	Won	
Edison Awards	1989	International Vocalist	Till I Loved You	Won	
Edison Awards	1992	International Extra	Just for the Record...	Won (Note: Tied with James Brown for Star Time.)	
Elle Women in Hollywood	2011	L'Oreal Paris Legend †	—N/a	Won	
Film Society of Lincoln Center	2013	Chaplin Award †	—N/a	Won	
Glamour Awards	2013	Woman of the Year Lifetime Achievement †	—N/a	Won	
Golden Apple Awards	1968	Female Star of the Year	—N/a	Won	
Golden Apple Awards	1973	Female Star of the Year	—N/a	Nominated	
Golden Raspberry Awards	1982	Worst Actress	All Night Long	Nominated	
Golden Raspberry Awards	1984	Worst Actor	Yentl	Nominated	
Golden Raspberry Awards	2011	Worst Supporting Actress	Little Fockers	Nominated	
Golden Raspberry Awards	2013	Worst Actress	The Guilt Trip	Nominated	
Hollywood Music in Media Awards	2024	Best Original Song in a TV Show/Limited Series	"Love Will Survive"	Won	
The Hollywood Reporter Women in Entertainment	2015	Sherry Lansing Leadership Award †	—N/a	Won	
Human Rights Campaign	2004	Humanitarian Award †	—N/a	Won	
Mademoiselle	1964	MLLE Merit Award	—N/a	Won	
MusiCares	2011	MusiCares Person of the Year †	—N/a	Won	
NARM Awards	1964	Best Selling Female Vocalist	—N/a	Won	
NARM Awards	1965	Best Selling Female Vocalist	—N/a	Won	
NARM Awards	1966	Best Selling Female Vocalist	—N/a	Won	
NARM Awards	1967	Best Selling Female Vocalist	—N/a	Won	
NARM Awards	1978	Best Selling Movie Soundtrack	A Star Is Born	Won	
NARM Awards	1979	Best Selling Album by a Female Artist	Barbra Streisand's Greatest Hits Volume 2	Won (Note: Tied with Donna Summer for Live and More.)	
NARM Awards	1988	Chairman's Award For Sustained Creative Achievement †	—N/a	Won	
Nastro d'Argento	1984	Best Foreign Actress	Yentl	Nominated	
Nastro d'Argento	1984	Best New Foreign Director †	Yentl	Won	
National Association of Theatre Owners	1968	Star of Stars †	—N/a	Won	
National Organization for Women	1984	Woman of Courage Award †	—N/a	Won	
People's Choice Awards	1975	Favorite All-Around Female Entertainer	—N/a	Nominated	
People's Choice Awards	1975	Favorite Female Music Performer	—N/a	Won (Note: Tied with Olivia Newton-John.)	
People's Choice Awards	1975	Favorite Motion Picture Actress	—N/a	Won	
People's Choice Awards	1976	Favorite Motion Picture Actress	—N/a	Nominated	
People's Choice Awards	1977	Favorite Motion Picture Actress	—N/a	Won	
People's Choice Awards	1978	Favorite Motion Picture Actress	—N/a	Won	
People's Choice Awards	1980	Favorite Theme/Song from a Motion Picture	"The Main Event/Fight"	Won	
People's Choice Awards	1981	Favorite All-Around Female Entertainer	—N/a	Nominated	
People's Choice Awards	1981	Favourite Female Musical Performer	—N/a	Nominated	
People's Choice Awards	1984	Favorite All-Around Female Entertainer	—N/a	Won (Note: Tied with Barbara Mandrell.)	
People's Choice Awards	1984	Favorite Motion Picture Actress	—N/a	Nominated	
People's Choice Awards	1985	Favorite All-Around Female Entertainer	—N/a	Nominated	
People's Choice Awards	1986	Favorite All-Around Female Entertainer	—N/a	Nominated	
People's Choice Awards	1987	Favorite All-Around Female Entertainer	—N/a	Nominated	
People's Choice Awards	1987	Favourite Female Musical Performer	—N/a	Nominated	
People's Choice Awards	1988	Favorite All-Around Female Entertainer	—N/a	Nominated	
People's Choice Awards	1988	Favourite All-Time Musical Star	—N/a	Won	
People's Choice Awards	1989	Favourite Female Musical Performer	—N/a	Nominated	
Pollstar Awards	1994	Major Tour of the Year	Barbra Streisand in Concert	Nominated	
Rainbow/PUSH	2001	Liberty and Justice Award †	—N/a	Won	
Stinkers Bad Movie Awards	1980	Worst Actress	The Main Event	Nominated	
Stinkers Bad Movie Awards	1980	Worst On-Screen Couple	The Main Event	Nominated (Note: Shared with Ryan O'Neal.)	
Telegatto	1977	Telegatto	—N/a	Won	
UCLA Institute of the Environment & Sustainability	2019	Hollywood for Science Gala †	—N/a	Won	
Women Film Critics Circle	2012	Lifetime Achievement Award †	—N/a	Won	
Women in Film Honors	1984	Crystal Award †	—N/a	Won	

== State honors ==
Country	Year	Honor	Ref
France	1984	Order of Arts and Letters	
France	2007	Legion of Honour	
Israel	1968	Israel Freedom Medal	
United States	2000	National Medal of Arts	
United States	2015	Presidential Medal of Freedom	

== Miscellaneous honors ==
Organization	Year	Honor	Work	Ref
Board of Regents of the University of the State of New York	2008	The Long Island Music and Entertainment Hall of Fame	—N/a	
Brandeis University	1995	Honorary Degree	—N/a	
The California Museum	2010	California Hall of Fame	—N/a	
Hebrew University of Jerusalem	2013	Honorary Doctorate of Philosophy	—N/a	
Genesis Prize Foundation	2023	10th Anniversary Genesis Prize	—N/a	
Hollywood Walk of Fame	1976	Hollywood Walk of Fame	—N/a	
Kennedy Center	2008	Kennedy Center Honors	—N/a	
Library of Congress	2000	Library of Congress Living Legend	—N/a	
Library of Congress	2016	National Recording Registry	People	
The Recording Academy	1998	Grammy Hall of Fame	"People"	
The Recording Academy	2004	Grammy Hall of Fame	Funny Girl (Original Broadway Cast Recording) (Note: Shared with Sydney Chaplin.)	
The Recording Academy	2006	Grammy Hall of Fame	The Barbra Streisand Album	
The Recording Academy	2008	Grammy Hall of Fame	"The Way We Were"	
Weitzman National Museum of American Jewish History	2010	Only in America Hall of Fame	—N/a	

== See also ==
- Barbra Streisand discography
- List of songs recorded by Barbra Streisand
- Barbra Streisand on screen and stage
- EGOT
- List of actors with more than one Academy Award nomination in the acting categories
- List of actors with Academy Award nominations
- List of stars on the Hollywood Walk of Fame
- List of actors with Hollywood Walk of Fame motion picture stars
- List of members of the Ordre des Arts et des Lettres
- List of foreign recipients of the Légion d'Honneur by country
- List of Presidential Medal of Freedom recipients

== Bibliography ==
- Streisand, Barbra (2023). My Name Is Barbra. Viking Press. ISBN 9780525429524.
