= Barbra Streisand on screen and stage =

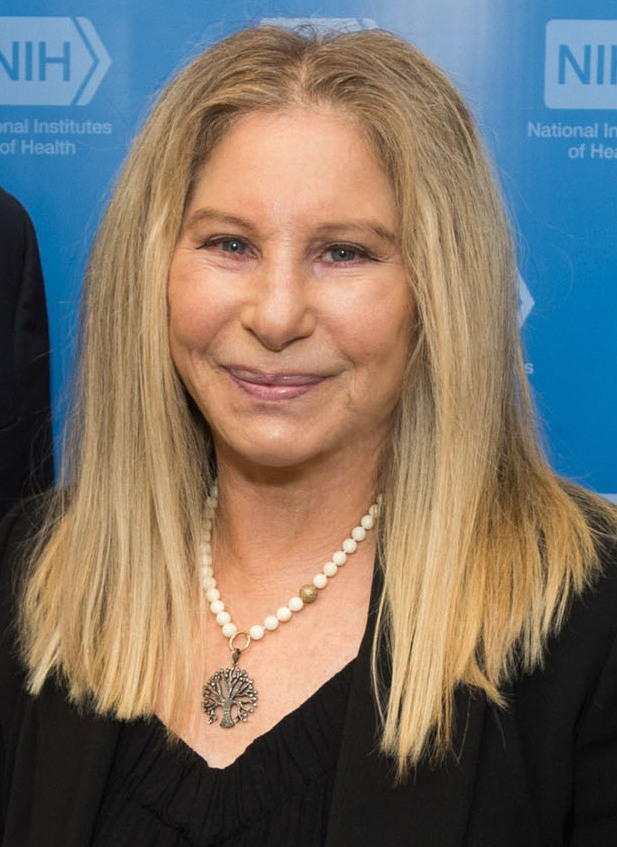
Streisand in 2018

Barbra Streisand is an American singer, actor, producer, director and screenwriter.

Streisand's career began in the early 1960s performing in nightclubs and Broadway theaters. Following her established recording success, Streisand ventured into film by the end of the 1960s. She starred in the critically acclaimed Funny Girl (1968), winning the Academy Award for Best Actress at the 41st Academy Awards. Additional fame on the big screen followed with the extravagant musical Hello, Dolly! (1969), the screwball comedy What's Up, Doc? (1972), and the romantic drama The Way We Were (1973). With the release of Yentl (1983), Streisand became the first woman to write, produce, direct, and star in a major studio film. She received the Golden Globe Award for Best Director, becoming the first (and for 37 years, the only) woman to win that award. Streisand later produced and directed The Prince of Tides (1991), and The Mirror Has Two Faces (1996).

She has also starred in several television specials, including concert films.

== Film ==
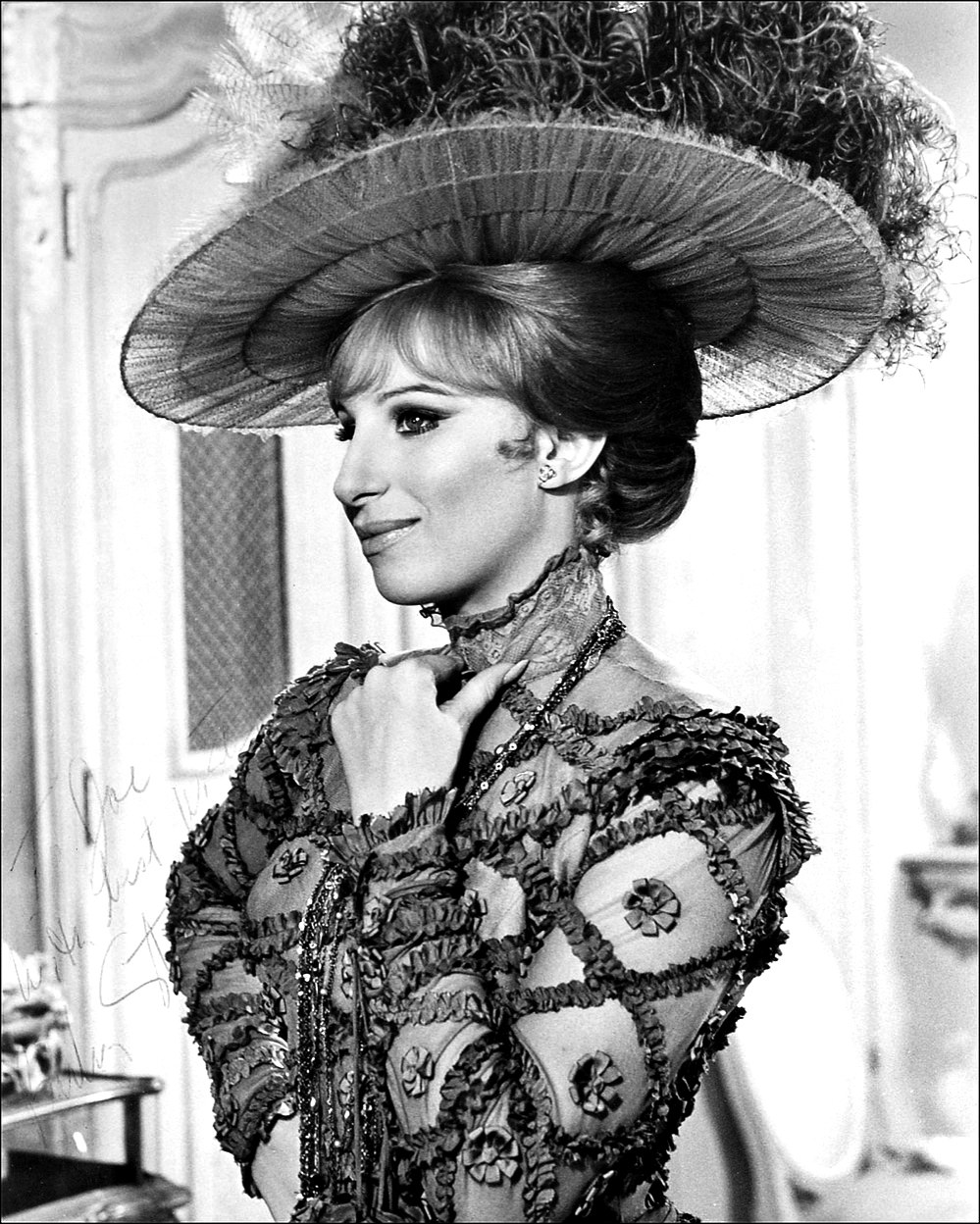
Streisand in Hello, Dolly! (1969).

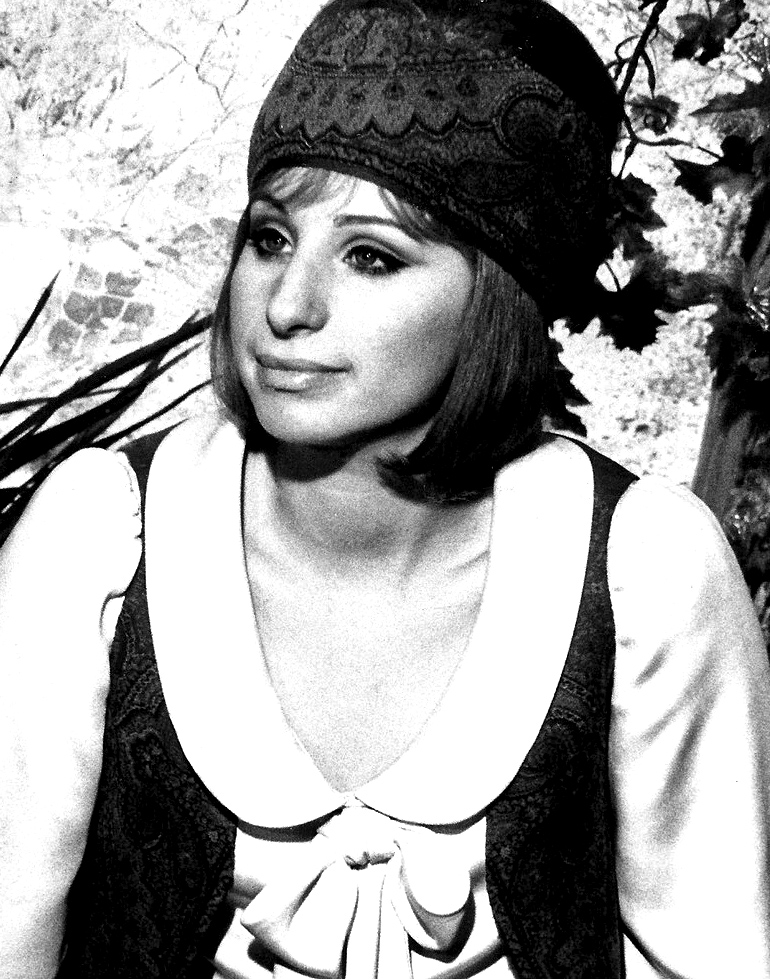
Streisand in On a Clear Day You Can See Forever (1970).

Year	Title	Credited as					Role
Year	Title	Actor	Director	Screenwriter	Producer	Exec. producer	Role
1968	Funny Girl	Yes					Fanny Brice
1969	Hello, Dolly!	Yes					Dolly Levi
1970	On a Clear Day You Can See Forever	Yes					Daisy Gamble / Melinda Tentrees
1970	The Owl and the Pussycat	Yes					Doris Wilgus / Wadsworth / Wellington / Waverly
1972	What's Up, Doc?	Yes					Judy Maxwell
1972	Up the Sandbox	Yes					Margaret Reynolds
1973	The Way We Were	Yes					Katie Morosky
1974	For Pete's Sake	Yes					Henrietta "Henry" Robbins
1975	Funny Lady	Yes					Fanny Brice
1976	A Star Is Born	Yes				Yes	Esther Hoffman Howard
1979	The Main Event	Yes					Hillary Kramer
1981	All Night Long	Yes					Cheryl Gibbons
1983	Yentl	Yes	Yes	Yes	Yes		Yentl Mendel / Anshel Mendel
1987	Nuts	Yes			Yes		Claudia Faith Draper
1991	The Prince of Tides	Yes	Yes		Yes		Dr. Susan Lowenstein
1996	The Mirror Has Two Faces	Yes	Yes		Yes		Rose Morgan
2004	Meet the Fockers	Yes					Rozalin "Roz" Focker
2010	Little Fockers	Yes					Rozalin "Roz" Focker
2012	The Guilt Trip	Yes				Yes	Joyce Brewster

== Television ==
=== Television films ===
Year	Title	Credited as
Year	Title	Exec. producer
1995	Serving in Silence: The Margarethe Cammermeyer Story	Yes
1997	Rescuers: Stories of Courage: Two Women	Yes
1998	The Long Island Incident	Yes
1998	Rescuers: Stories of Courage: Two Women	Yes
1998	Rescuers: Stories of Courage: Two Families	Yes
2000	Frankie & Hazel	Yes
2001	What Makes a Family	Yes
2001	Varian's War	Yes

=== Television series ===
Year	Title	Credited as		Role	Note(s)
Year	Title	Actor	Exec. producer	Role	Note(s)
1987	CBS Summer Playhouse		Yes	—N/a	Episode: "Mabel and Max"
1988	Miami Vice	Yes		Pedestrian	Episode: "Badge of Dishonor"; uncredited
2000–2003	The Living Century		Yes	—N/a	5 episodes
2016	Modern Family	Yes		Herself (voice)	Episode: "Playdates"

=== Television specials ===
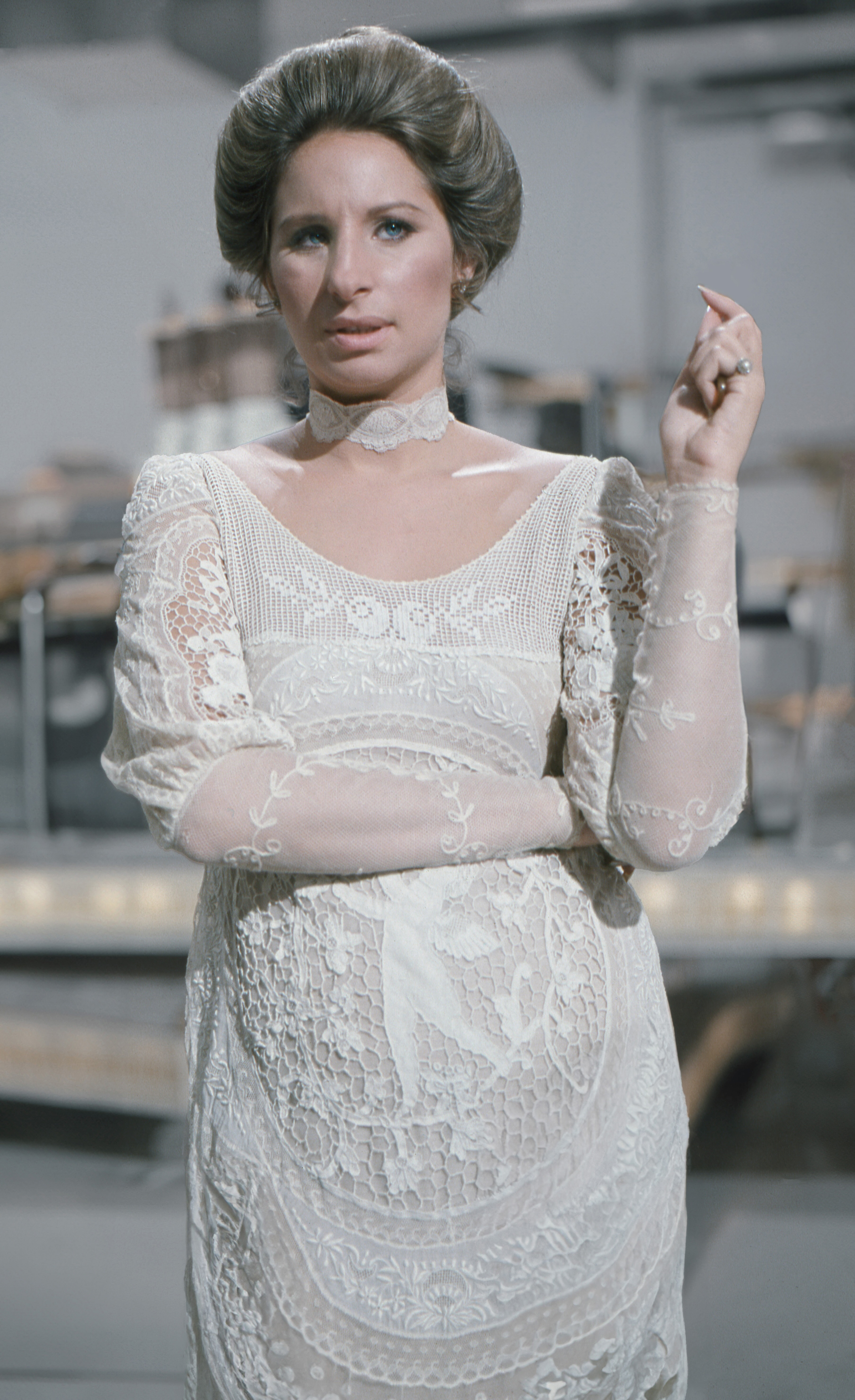
Streisand taping her TV Special Barbra Streisand … and other Musical Instruments in 1973.

Year	Title	Credited as					Network
Year	Title	Actor	director	Screenwriter	Producer	Exec. producer	Network
1965	My Name Is Barbra	Yes					CBS
1966	Color Me Barbra	Yes					CBS
1967	The Belle of 14th Street	Yes					CBS
1968	A Happening in Central Park	Yes					CBS
1973	Barbra Streisand…and Other Musical Instruments	Yes					CBS
1975	Funny Girl to Funny Lady	Yes					ABC
1976	Barbra: With One More Look at You	Yes					Syndication
1978	Getting in Shape for The Main Event	Yes					Syndication
1983	A Film Is Born: The Making of 'Yentl'	Yes					Syndication
1986	Putting it Together: The Making of The Broadway Album	Yes	Yes		Yes		HBO
1986	One Voice	Yes		Yes	Yes		HBO
1994	Barbra Streisand: The Concert	Yes	Yes		Yes		HBO
2001	Barbra Streisand: Timeless	Yes	Yes	Yes	Yes		Fox
2009	Streisand: Live in Concert	Yes	Yes	Yes		Yes	CBS
2011	One Night Only: Barbra Streisand and Quartet at The Village Vanguard	Yes				Yes	PBS
2013	Barbra Streisand: Back to Brooklyn	Yes		Yes		Yes	PBS
2017	The Music … The Mem'ries … The Magic!	Yes	Yes	Yes		Yes	Netflix

== Theatre ==
Year	Title	Role	Venue	Ref.
1961–1963	I Can Get It for You Wholesale	Miss Marmelstein	Shubert Theatre, Broadway	
1964–1965	Funny Girl	Fanny Brice	Winter Garden Theatre, Broadway	
1966	Funny Girl	Fanny Brice	Prince of Wales Theatre, West End	

== See also ==
- List of awards and nominations received by Barbra Streisand
