= List of awards and nominations received by Hart to Hart =

This is a list of awards and nominations for the television drama series Hart to Hart (1979–1984).

== By award ==
=== American Cinema Editors ===
- 1979: Best Edited Episode – TV Series (Bob Bring for "Max in Love", nominated)

=== Emmy Awards ===
- 1980: Outstanding Art Direction – Series (for "Man with Jade Eyes", nominated)
- 1981: Outstanding Actress – Drama Series (Stefanie Powers for playing "Jennifer Hart", nominated)
- 1981: Outstanding Art Direction – Series (for "Blue Chip Murders", nominated)
- 1981: Outstanding Film Sound Mixing (for "Tis the Season to be Murdered", nominated)
- 1982: Outstanding Actress – Drama Series (Powers, nominated)
- 1982: Outstanding Art Direction – Series (for "The Hart of the Matter", nominated)

=== Golden Globe Awards ===
- 1979: Best Actor – Drama Series (Robert Wagner for playing "Jonathan Hart", nominated)
- 1979: Best Actress – Drama Series (Stefanie Powers for playing "Jennifer Hart", nominated)
- 1980: Best Actor – Drama Series (Wagner, nominated)
- 1980: Best Actress – Drama Series (Powers, nominated)
- 1980: Best Series – Drama (nominated)
- 1981: Best Actress – Drama Series (Powers, nominated)
- 1981: Best Series – Drama (nominated)
- 1982: Best Actor – Drama Series (Wagner, nominated)
- 1982: Best Actress – Drama Series (Powers, nominated)
- 1982: Best Series – Drama (nominated)
- 1982: Best Supporting Actor – (Mini)Series or TV Film (Lionel Stander for playing "Max", won)
- 1983: Best Actor – Drama Series (Wagner, nominated)
- 1983: Best Actress – Drama Series (Powers, nominated)
- 1983: Best Series – Drama (nominated)

=== People's Choice Awards ===
- 1980: Favorite New TV Dramatic Program (won)

=== Young Artist Awards ===
- 1983: Best Young Actress, Guest on a Series (Roxana Zal for playing "Riley", won)
- 1983: Best Young Actor, Guest on a Series (Rossie Harris for playing "Jess", nominated)
