= Back to Broadway =

Studio album by Barbra Streisand
- Released: June 29, 1993
- Studios: Angel Recording Studios (Islington, London, England); Chartmaker Studios (Malibu, California); Enterprise Studios (Burbank, California); Ground Control Studios (Santa Monica, California); Ocean Way Recording (Hollywood, California); Sony Pictures Studios (Culver City, California); Todd-AO Scoring Stage (Studio City, California); The Village Recorder and Record Plant (Los Angeles, California); The Hit Factory (New York City, New York)
- Length: 49:41
- Label: Columbia
- Producers: David Foster; Barbra Streisand; Andrew Lloyd Webber; Nigel Wright

Barbra Streisand chronology
Just for the Record... (1991)	Back to Broadway (1993)	The Concert (1994)

Professional ratings
Review scores
Source	Rating
AllMusic	3/5 stars
Entertainment Weekly	C+
Music Week	4/5 stars
Philadelphia Inquirer	3.5/4 stars

Back to Broadway is the twenty-sixth studio album by American singer Barbra Streisand, released in 1993, consisting of songs from Broadway musicals, a follow-up to her successful 1985 Broadway Album.

Back to Broadway debuted at number 1 on the Billboard 200 chart, earning Streisand the distinction of being the only female artist to have a number-one album in four different decades. The album sold 189,000 copies in the first week, and has been certified 2× Platinum by the RIAA, her fifth album to do so. The album was another smash hit for Streisand, also reaching the top 10 in Canada, the UK, and Australia.

== Track listing ==
No.	Title	Writer(s)	Length
1.	"Some Enchanted Evening" (from South Pacific, 1949)	Oscar Hammerstein II; Richard Rodgers	3:52
2.	"Everybody Says Don't" (from Anyone Can Whistle, 1964)	Stephen Sondheim	2:34
3.	"The Music of the Night" (feat. Michael Crawford) (from The Phantom of the Opera, 1986)	Andrew Lloyd Webber; Charles Hart; Richard Stilgoe	5:35
4.	"Speak Low" (from One Touch of Venus, 1943)	Ogden Nash; Kurt Weill	4:08
5.	"As If We Never Said Goodbye" (from Sunset Boulevard, 1992)	Don Black; Christopher Hampton; Lloyd Webber	4:44
6.	"Children Will Listen" (from Into the Woods, 1986)	Sondheim	4:09
7.	"I Have a Love"/"One Hand, One Heart" (feat. Johnny Mathis) (from West Side Story, 1957)	Sondheim; Leonard Bernstein	4:44
8.	"I've Never Been in Love Before" (from Guys and Dolls, 1950)	Frank Loesser	3:49
9.	"Luck Be a Lady" (from Guys and Dolls)	Loesser	3:31
10.	"With One Look" (from Sunset Boulevard)	Black; Hampton; Lloyd Webber	3:32
11.	"The Man I Love" (from Strike Up the Band, 1930)	Ira Gershwin; George Gershwin	3:39
12.	"Move On" (from Sunday in the Park with George, 1983)	Sondheim	5:24

== Personnel ==
Musicians

- Barbra Streisand – vocals
- Mark Portmann – synthesizers (1, 9), acoustic piano (6)
- Simon Franglen – synthesizer overdubs (1), Synclavier programming (2, 4, 6), synthesizers (2, 4, 6)
- Ian Underwood – synthesizers (1, 11, 12)
- Greg Phillinganes – acoustic piano (5, 10)
- CJ Vanston – keyboards (5), synthesizers (10)
- John Berkman – acoustic piano (6)
- Tony Smith – synthesizer programming (7)
- Mike Lang – keyboards (10, 12)
- Scott Frankel – acoustic piano (12)
- Michael Thompson – guitars (4)
- Dean Parks – guitars (5)
- George Doering – guitars (10)
- Bob Mann – guitars (10)
- Nathan East – bass (2, 4, 12)
- Abraham Laboriel – bass (5)
- Neil Stubenhaus – bass (10)
- Mike Baird – drums (5, 10)
- Jeff Hamilton – drums (9)
- Steve Schaeffer – drums (12)
- Paulinho da Costa – percussion (4, 9)
- Alan Estes – percussion (5, 10, 12)
- David Boruff – saxophone solo (4)
- London Symphony Orchestra – orchestra (3)
- Michael Crawford – vocals (3)
- Johnny Mathis – vocals (7)

Music arrangements and orchestrations

- David Foster – arrangements (1, 4, 7)
- Johnny Mandel – arrangements (1, 4, 11), orchestration (1, 4)
- Eddie Karam – conductor (1, 4, 11)
- William Ross – arrangements (2), conductor (2, 7), orchestration (7)
- Barbra Streisand – arrangements (2)
- Andrew Pryce Jackman – arrangements and conductor (3)
- Andrew Lloyd Webber – orchestration (5, 10)
- John Cameron – orchestration (5)
- David Cullen – orchestration (5, 10)
- Jonathan Tunick – arrangements and conductor (6)
- Mark Portmann – co-arrangements (6)
- Billy Byers – orchestration (7)
- Jeremy Lubbock – arrangements and conductor (8, 9)
- David Caddick – conductor (10)
- Michael Starobin – arrangements and conductor (12)

== Production ==
- Jay Landers – A&R
- David Foster – producer (1–4, 7–9, 11)
- Barbra Streisand – producer (2, 5, 6, 8, 10, 12), co-producer (3, 4, 9, 11)
- Jeff Jarratt – associate producer (3)
- Don Reedman – associate producer (3)
- Andrew Lloyd Webber – producer (5, 10)
- Nigel Wright – producer (5, 10)
- Mark Portmann – co-producer (6)
- Marsha Burns – project coordinator
- Shari Sutcliffe – project coordinating assistant
- Kim Shalecki – assistant to Barbra Streisand
- Nancy Donald – art direction
- Cheri Gray – design
- Michael Halsband – back cover photography
- Firooz Zahedi – front cover photography
- Martin Erlichman – representative to Barbra Streisand

Technical credits

- George Marino – mastering at Sterling Sound (New York, NY)
- Al Schmitt – recording (1, 4, 7, 11)
- John Timperley – orchestra recording (3)
- Shawn Murphy – recording (8, 12)
- Humberto Gatica – mixing, additional recording (1, 4, 11), recording (2, 5, 6, 9, 10, 12), vocal recording (3)
- David Reitzas – digital vocal editing, additional recording (1, 2, 8, 11, 12), additional vocal engineer (3), recording (4, 7, 9)
- Andy Bass – assistant engineer
- Craig Brock – assistant engineer
- Cary Butler – assistant engineer
- Felipe Elgueta – assistant engineer
- David Eike – assistant engineer
- Eric Greedy – assistant engineer
- Mark Guilbeault – assistant engineer
- Steve Holroyd – assistant engineer
- David Marquette – assistant engineer
- Sue McLean – assistant engineer
- Alex Rodriguez – assistant engineer
- Andy Smith – assistant engineer

== Charts ==
=== Weekly charts ===
Chart (1993)	Peak position
Australian Albums (ARIA)	3
Austrian Albums (Ö3 Austria)	37
Canada Top Albums/CDs (RPM)	6
Dutch Albums (Album Top 100)	38
European Albums (Music & Media)	33
German Albums (Offizielle Top 100)	81
New Zealand Albums (RMNZ)	11
Swedish Albums (Sverigetopplistan)	32
UK Albums (Official Charts)	4
US Billboard 200	1

=== Year-end charts ===
Chart (1993)	Position
Canadian Albums (RPM)	56
US Billboard 200	56

== Certifications and sales ==
Region	Certification	Certified units/sales
Australia (ARIA)	Gold	35,000^{^}
Canada (Music Canada)	Platinum	100,000^{^}
United Kingdom (BPI)	Gold	100,000^{^}
United States (RIAA)	2× Platinum	2,000,000^{^}
^{^} Shipments figures based on certification alone.

== Accolades ==
The album earned two nominations at the 36th Annual Grammy Awards:

- Best Traditional Pop Vocal Album
- Best Pop Performance by a Duo or Group with Vocal: "The Music of the Night" (duet with Michael Crawford)
