= Barbra Streisand in Concert =

1993–94 concert tour by Barbra Streisand

- Tour by Barbra Streisand
- Promotional poster for tour
- Start date: December 31, 1993
- End date: July 24, 1994
- Legs: 1
- No. of shows: 22 in North America; 4 in Europe; 26 Total
- Box office: $54.9 million ($116.47 in 2024 dollars)

Barbra Streisand concert chronology
- An Evening with Barbra Streisand (1966); Barbra Streisand in Concert (1994); Timeless (1999–2000)

Barbra Streisand in Concert is Barbra Streisand's first full tour which ran from 1993 through 1994. The tour consisted of 26 shows starting on New Year's Eve 1993 in Las Vegas and ended Anaheim, California in July 1994. The 18 shows that went on sale following the new year concerts in Las Vegas sold out in 1 hour. This tour was also the first time Barbra toured anywhere in Europe and was the last until her Timeless tour in 2000.

== Background ==
Barbra had only toured once previously, in 1966, when a planned five-week 20-city tour was cut to four dates, due to her pregnancy. Although Streisand continued to perform at various concert events, the 1994 tour marked her first after decades of reported stage fright.

== Commercial reception ==
According to Barbra's official website, the tour set attendance and box office records in every city it played in with the first 18 dates selling out within 1 hour. The phone requests for tickets reached 5 million within the first hour the tour went on sale. The tour grossed $50 million in 1994.

== Broadcasts and recordings ==
HBO broadcast the final Anaheim show (taped July 24, 1994) as Barbra: The Concert on August 21, 1994, garnering a television audience of 11.2 million viewers, and becoming the highest-rated musical event in the network's history. A home video release of The Concert followed a month later on VHS and Laserdisc. At the 47th Primetime Emmy Awards, the special was nominated in ten categories, winning five, including Outstanding Variety or Music Special and Individual Performance in a Variety or Music Program.

A live album recorded at Madison Square Garden was released in September 1994, The Concert reached number 10 on the Billboard Album Chart and was certified triple Platinum by the RIAA.

In 2004 Sony BMG produced a DVD of the previously unreleased New Year's Eve shows recorded in Las Vegas, The Concert: Live at the MGM Grand.

== Set list ==
1. "As If We Never Said Goodbye"
2. "I'm Still Here"
3. "Can't Help Lovin' That Man"
4. "I'll Know"
5. "People"
6. "Lover Man (Oh, Where Can You Be?)"
7. "Will He Like Me?"
8. "He Touched Me"
9. "Evergreen"
10. "The Man That Got Away"
11. "On a Clear Day (You Can See Forever)"
12. "The Way We Were"
13. "You Don't Bring Me Flowers"
14. "Lazy Afternoon"
15. "Once Upon a Dream" / "When You Wish Upon a Star" / "Someday My Prince Will Come"
16. "Not While I'm Around"
17. "Ordinary Miracles"
18. "Where Is It Written?" / "Papa, Can You Hear Me?" / "A Piece of Sky"
19. "Happy Days Are Here Again"
20. "My Man"
21. "For All We Know"
22. "Somewhere"

Set list per official DVD track listing.

== Shows ==
List of concerts, showing date, city, country, venue, tickets sold, number of available tickets and amount of gross revenue
Date	City	Country	Venue	Attendance	Revenue
New Year's Eve Concerts
December 31, 1993	Las Vegas	United States	MGM Grand Garden Arena	25,120 / 25,120	$13,560,750
January 1, 1994	Las Vegas	United States	MGM Grand Garden Arena	25,120 / 25,120	$13,560,750
Europe
April 20, 1994	London	England	Wembley Arena	—	—
April 25, 1994	London	England	Wembley Arena	—	—
April 27, 1994	London	England	Wembley Arena	—	—
April 29, 1994	London	England	Wembley Arena	—	—
North America
May 10, 1994	Landover	United States	USAir Arena	27,728 / 27,728	$4,688,200
May 12, 1994	Landover	United States	USAir Arena	27,728 / 27,728	$4,688,200
May 15, 1994	Auburn Hills	United States	The Palace of Auburn Hills	45,160 / 45,160	$7,780,700
May 17, 1994	Auburn Hills	United States	The Palace of Auburn Hills	45,160 / 45,160	$7,780,700
May 19, 1994	Auburn Hills	United States	The Palace of Auburn Hills	45,160 / 45,160	$7,780,700
June 2, 1994	Anaheim	United States	Arrowhead Pond of Anaheim	77,130 / 77,130	$12,400,650
June 4, 1994	Anaheim	United States	Arrowhead Pond of Anaheim	77,130 / 77,130	$12,400,650
June 7, 1994	San Jose	United States	San Jose Arena	24,477 / 24,477	$4,001,375
June 9, 1994	San Jose	United States	San Jose Arena	24,477 / 24,477	$4,001,375
June 20, 1994	New York City	United States	Madison Square Garden	94,284 / 94,284	$16,488,900
June 23, 1994	New York City	United States	Madison Square Garden	94,284 / 94,284	$16,488,900
June 26, 1994	New York City	United States	Madison Square Garden	94,284 / 94,284	$16,488,900
June 28, 1994	New York City	United States	Madison Square Garden	94,284 / 94,284	$16,488,900
June 30, 1994	New York City	United States	Madison Square Garden	94,284 / 94,284	$16,488,900
July 10, 1994	New York City	United States	Madison Square Garden	94,284 / 94,284	$16,488,900
July 12, 1994	New York City	United States	Madison Square Garden	94,284 / 94,284	$16,488,900
July 18, 1994	Anaheim	United States	Arrowhead Pond of Anaheim	(Note: The score data is representative of the six shows in Anaheim, California at the Arrowhead Pond of Anaheim on June 2, 4, July 18, 20, 22, and 24 respectively.)	
July 20, 1994	Anaheim	United States	Arrowhead Pond of Anaheim	(Note: The score data is representative of the six shows in Anaheim, California at the Arrowhead Pond of Anaheim on June 2, 4, July 18, 20, 22, and 24 respectively.)	
July 22, 1994	Anaheim	United States	Arrowhead Pond of Anaheim	(Note: The score data is representative of the six shows in Anaheim, California at the Arrowhead Pond of Anaheim on June 2, 4, July 18, 20, 22, and 24 respectively.)	
July 24, 1994	Anaheim	United States	Arrowhead Pond of Anaheim	(Note: The score data is representative of the six shows in Anaheim, California at the Arrowhead Pond of Anaheim on June 2, 4, July 18, 20, 22, and 24 respectively.)	
Total				288,501 / 288,501	$58,920,575

== See also ==
- List of highest-grossing concert tours by women
