= 19th People's Choice Awards =

Pop culture award show held in 1993

- Date: March 9, 1993
- Location: Universal Studios Hollywood, Universal City, California
- Hosted by: John Ritter and Jane Seymour

Television/radio coverage
- Network: CBS

The 19th People's Choice Awards, honoring the best in popular culture for 1992, were held on March 9, 1993, at Universal Studios Hollywood, in Universal City, California. They were hosted by John Ritter and Jane Seymour, and broadcast on CBS.

Special tributes were paid to both Knots Landing and Cheers for their long runs on television.

== Awards ==
Winners are listed first, in bold.

Favorite New TV Comedy	Favorite Female Musical Performer
**Martin**	**Whitney Houston**
Favorite Comedy Motion Picture	Favorite Musical Group Or Band
**Home Alone 2: Lost in New York**; **Sister Act**	**Alabama**
Favorite Male TV Performer	Favorite Male Musical Performer
**Tim Allen – Home Improvement**	**Garth Brooks**
Favorite Female Country Music Performer	Favorite Female TV Performer
**Reba McEntire**	**Candice Bergen – Murphy Brown**
Favorite Male Country Music Performer	Favorite TV Comedy
**Garth Brooks**	**Home Improvement**
Favorite TV Drama	Favorite Actor In A Dramatic Motion Picture
**L.A. Law**	**Kevin Costner – The Bodyguard**
Favorite Dramatic Motion Picture	Favorite Daytime Serial
**A Few Good Men**	**All My Children**; **The Young and the Restless**
Favorite Actor In A Comedy Motion Picture	Favorite Actress In A Dramatic Motion Picture
**Steve Martin – Housesitter**	**Demi Moore – A Few Good Men**
Favorite New Music Video	Favorite Actress In A Comedy Motion Picture
**I Will Always Love You**	**Whoopi Goldberg – Sister Act**
Favorite Motion Picture Actor	Favorite Motion Picture Actress
**Kevin Costner**	**Whoopi Goldberg**
Favorite Motion Picture	Favorite New TV Dramatic Series
**A Few Good Men**	**Melrose Place**
