= The Concert (Barbra Streisand album) =

Live album by Barbra Streisand
- Released: September 1994
- Recorded: 1994
- Venues: Madison Square Garden, New York City
- Length: 48:36 (disc 1); 54:51 (disc 2); 103:27 (total)
- Label: Columbia
- Producers: Barbra Streisand, Jay Landers

Barbra Streisand chronology
Back to Broadway (1993)	The Concert (1994)	Higher Ground (1997)

Professional ratings
Review scores
Source	Rating
Music Week	4/5 stars

The Concert is a live album by Barbra Streisand, released in September 1994 through Columbia Records. The album reached a peak position of number ten on the Billboard 200. The Concert was certified platinum in Australia, Canada and the United States. The song "Ordinary Miracles" was released as a CD-single by Columbia Records including a studio version of the track produced by Walter Afanasieff. It was arranged and conducted by Marvin Hamlisch. An abbreviated version of the album titled The Concert: Highlights was also released with a different cover art and was certified gold by the RIAA, while the double album received a triple-platinum certification. The album was recorded at Madison Square Garden during the Barbra Streisand in Concert tour.

== Track listing ==
Disc 1/Act I

1. "Overture" – 5:47
2. "As If We Never Said Goodbye" – 4:20 (Andrew Lloyd Webber, Don Black, Christopher Hampton, A. Powers)
3. Opening Remarks – 1:13
4. "I'm Still Here/Everybody Says Don't/Don't Rain on My Parade" (Stephen Sondheim / Sondheim / Jule Styne) – 4:25
5. "Can't Help Lovin' That Man" – 4:29 (Jerome Kern, Oscar Hammerstein II)
6. "I'll Know" (with Marlon Brando) – 2:48 (Frank Loesser)
7. "People" – 4:18 (Jule Styne, Bob Merrill)
8. "Lover Man" – 1:17 (Jimmy Davis, Roger J. Ramirez, Jimmy Sherman)
9. Therapist Dialogue #1 – 1:24
10. "Will He Like Me?" – 1:59 (Sheldon Harnick, Jerry Bock)
11. Therapist Dialogue #2 – 1:00
12. "He Touched Me" – 2:51 (Milton Schafer, Ira Levin)
13. "Evergreen" – 3:17 (Barbra Streisand, Paul Williams)
14. Therapist Dialogue #3 – 1:54
15. "The Man That Got Away" – 4:05 (Harold Arlen, Ira Gershwin)
16. "On a Clear Day (You Can See Forever)" – 3:29 (Burton Lane, Alan Jay Lerner)

Disc 2/Act II

1. "Entr'acte" – 3:02
2. "The Way We Were" – 3:15 (Marvin Hamlisch, Alan Bergman, Marilyn Bergman)
3. "You Don't Bring Me Flowers" – 4:44 (Neil Diamond, Alan Bergman, Marilyn Bergman)
4. "Lazy Afternoon" – 4:30 (John LaTouche, Jerome Moross)
5. Disney Medley: "Once Upon a Dream/When You Wish Upon a Star/Someday My Prince Will Come" – 5:07
6. "Not While I'm Around" (Sondheim) – 3:03
7. "Ordinary Miracles" – 4:35 (Marvin Hamlisch, Alan Bergman, Marilyn Bergman)
8. Yentl Medley: "Where Is It Written/Papa, Can You Hear Me/Will Someone Ever Look at Me That Way/A Piece of Sky" – 9:18 (Michel Legrand, Alan Bergman, Marilyn Bergman)
9. "Happy Days Are Here Again" – 3:40 (Milton Ager, Jack Yellen)
10. "My Man" – 3:18 (Maurice Yvain, Channing Pollock, Albert Willemetz, Jacques Charles)
11. "For All We Know" – 5:04 (John Frederick Coots, Sam M. Lewis)
12. "Somewhere" – 5:15 (Leonard Bernstein, Sondheim)

== Charts and certifications ==
=== Weekly charts ===
Chart (1994)	Peak position
Australian Albums (ARIA)	20
Dutch Albums (Album Top 100)	25
European Albums (Music & Media)	81
German Albums (Offizielle Top 100)	92
Italian Albums (Musica e dischi)	16
Spain Albums (Promusicae)	12
UK Albums (Official Charts)	63
US Billboard 200	10

=== Year-end charts ===
Chart (1994)	Position
Australian Albums (ARIA)	90
Dutch Albums (Album Top 100)	83
Chart (1995)	Position
US Billboard 200	123

== Certifications and sales ==
Region	Certification	Certified units/sales
Australia (ARIA)	Platinum	70,000^{^}
Canada (Music Canada)	3× Platinum	300,000^{^}
Spain (Promusicae)	Gold	50,000^{^}
United States (RIAA)	3× Platinum	1,100,000
^{^} Shipments figures based on certification alone.
