= 5th People's Choice Awards =

Pop culture award show held in 1979

- Date: March 7, 1979
- Hosted by: Dick Van Dyke

Television/radio coverage
- Network: CBS

The 5th People's Choice Awards, honoring the best in popular culture for 1978, were held in 1979. They were broadcast on CBS.

== Winners ==
Favorite Female Performer in a New TV Program: Pam Dawber

Favorite Female TV Performer: Mary Tyler Moore, Carol Burnett

Favorite Motion Picture Supporting Actor: Jerry Reed

Favorite Non-Musical Motion Picture: Animal House

Favorite Overall Motion Picture: Grease

Favorite Overall New TV Program: Mork & Mindy

Favorite All-Around Male Entertainer: Burt Reynolds

Favorite Motion Picture Actress: Olivia Newton-John

Favorite All-Around Female Entertainer: Carol Burnett

Favorite Motion Picture Supporting Actress: Stockard Channing

Favorite New TV Comedy Program: Mork & Mindy

Favorite TV Comedy Program: M*A*S*H

Favorite TV Dramatic Program: Little House on the Prairie

Favorite TV Variety Program: Donny & Marie

Favorite Male Performer in a New TV Program: Robin Williams

Favorite Motion Picture Actor: Burt Reynolds

Favorite Male TV Performer: Alan Alda

Favorite Musical Motion Picture: Grease

Favorite Female Musical Performer: Olivia Newton-John

Favorite Male Musical Performer: Billy Joel, Andy Gibb

Favorite New Song: "Double Vision"

Favorite New TV Dramatic Program: Battlestar Galactica
