= 21st People's Choice Awards =

Pop culture award show held in 1995

- Date: March 5, 1995
- Location: Universal Studios Hollywood, Universal City, California
- Hosted by: Tim Daly and Annie Potts

Television/radio coverage
- Network: CBS

The 21st People's Choice Awards, honoring the best in popular culture for 1994, were held on March 5, 1995, at Universal Studios Hollywood, in Universal City, California. They were hosted by Tim Daly and Annie Potts, and broadcast on CBS.

Ron Howard received a special award for his work in the motion picture and television industry.

== Awards ==
Winners are listed first, in bold.

Favorite New TV Comedy	Favorite Female Musical Performer
**Ellen**; **Friends**	Reba McEntire
Favorite Comedy Motion Picture	Favorite Rock Group
**The Santa Clause**	Aerosmith
Favorite Male TV Performer	Favorite Male Musical Performer
**Tim Allen – Home Improvement**	Garth Brooks
Favorite Female Performer In A New TV Series	Favorite Female TV Performer
**Ellen DeGeneres – Ellen**	Roseanne Barr – Roseanne''
Favorite Actress In A Comedy Motion Picture	Favorite TV Comedy
**Whoopi Goldberg – Corrina, Corrina**	Home Improvement
Favorite TV Drama	Favorite Actor In A Comedy Motion Picture
**ER**	Tim Allen – The Santa Clause
Favorite Dramatic Motion Picture	Favorite Male Performer In A New TV Series
**Forrest Gump**	Anthony Edwards – ER
Favorite Actor In A Dramatic Motion Picture	Favorite Actress In A Dramatic Motion Picture
**Tom Hanks – Forrest Gump**	Jodie Foster – Nell
Favorite Motion Picture	Favorite New TV Dramatic Series
**Forrest Gump**	ER
