= 20th People's Choice Awards =

Pop culture award show held in 1994

- Date: March 8, 1994
- Location: Universal Studios Hollywood, Universal City, California
- Hosted by: Paul Reiser

Television/radio coverage
- Network: CBS

The 20th People's Choice Awards, honoring the best in popular culture for 1993, were held on March 8, 1994, at Universal Studios Hollywood, in Universal City, California. They were hosted by Paul Reiser, and broadcast on CBS.

Steven Spielberg received a special award for his work in the motion picture industry.

== Awards ==
Favorite New TV Comedy	Favorite Female Musical Performer
Frasier; Grace Under Fire	Reba McEntire
Favorite Comedy Motion Picture	Favorite Rock Group
Mrs. Doubtfire	Aerosmith
Favorite Male TV Performer	Favorite Male Musical Performer
Tim Allen – Home Improvement	Garth Brooks
Favorite Female Performer In A New TV Series	Favorite Female TV Performer
Brett Butler – Grace Under Fire	Roseanne Barr – Roseanne
Favorite Actress In A Comedy Motion Picture	Favorite TV Comedy
Whoopi Goldberg – Made in America	Home Improvement
Favorite TV Drama	Favorite Actor In A Dramatic Motion Picture
NYPD Blue	Tom Cruise – The Firm
Favorite Dramatic Motion Picture	Favorite Male Performer In A New TV Series
The Firm	Kelsey Grammer – Frasier
Favorite Actor In A Comedy Motion Picture	Favorite Actress In A Dramatic Motion Picture
Robin Williams – Mrs. Doubtfire	Julia Roberts – The Pelican Brief
Favorite Motion Picture	Favorite New TV Dramatic Series
Jurassic Park	NYPD Blue
