= 8th People's Choice Awards =

Pop culture award show held in 1982

- Date: March 18, 1982
- Hosted by: Army Archerd and John Forsythe

Television/radio coverage
- Network: CBS

The 8th People's Choice Awards, honoring the best in American popular culture for 1981, were held in 1982. They were broadcast on CBS.

== Winners ==
Favorite All-Around Female Entertainer: Barbara Mandrell

Favorite Country/Western Musical Performer: Kenny Rogers

Favorite Female Musical Performer: Barbara Mandrell

Favorite New Song: "Endless Love"

Favorite TV Dramatic Program: Dallas

Favorite Female TV Performer: Barbara Mandrell

Favorite Young TV Performer: Gary Coleman

Favorite Male Musical Performer: Kenny Rogers

Favorite Overall New TV Program: Hill Street Blues

Favorite TV Comedy Program: M*A*S*H

Favorite Male TV Performer: Alan Alda

Favorite New TV Dramatic Program: Hill Street Blues

Favorite TV Special: Bob Hope

Favorite Male Performer in a New TV Program: James Garner

Favorite Motion Picture: Raiders of the Lost Ark

Favorite Female Performer in a New TV Program: Linda Evans

Favorite Motion Picture Actor: Burt Reynolds

Favorite Motion Picture Actress: Sally Field, Jane Fonda

Favorite New TV Comedy Program: Private Benjamin

Favorite All-Around Male Entertainer: Burt Reynolds
