= 26th People's Choice Awards =

Pop culture award show held in 2000

- Date: January 9, 2000
- Location: Pasadena Civic Auditorium, Pasadena, California
- Hosted by: Don Johnson and Cheech Marin

Television/radio coverage
- Network: CBS

The 26th People's Choice Awards, honoring the best in popular culture for 1999, were held on January 9, 2000, taped live from the Pasadena Civic Auditorium in Pasadena, California. They were hosted by Don Johnson and Cheech Marin, and broadcast on CBS.

== Awards ==
Winners are listed first, in bold.

Favorite New TV Comedy	Favorite Female Musical Performer
**Stark Raving Mad**	Shania Twain
Favorite Motion Picture	Favorite Comedy Motion Picture
**The Sixth Sense**	Big Daddy
Favorite Male TV Performer	Favorite Male Musical Performer
**Drew Carey – The Drew Carey Show**	Ricky Martin
Favorite Musical Group Or Band	Favorite Motion Picture Star In A Drama
**Backstreet Boys**	Bruce Willis – The Sixth Sense
Favorite Female Performer In A New TV Series	Favorite Female TV Performer
**Jennifer Love Hewitt – Time of Your Life**	Calista Flockhart – Ally McBeal
Favorite Motion Picture Actor	Favorite TV Comedy
**Harrison Ford**	Friends
Favorite TV Drama	Favorite Motion Picture Actress
**ER**	Julia Roberts
Favorite Actor In A Comedy Motion Picture	Favorite Male Performer In A New TV Series
**Adam Sandler** – **Big Daddy**	Billy Campbell – Once and Again
Favorite New TV Dramatic Series	Favorite Dramatic Motion Picture
**Providence**	The Sixth Sense
