= 9th People's Choice Awards =

Pop culture award show held in 1983

- Date: March 17, 1983
- Hosted by: Dick Van Dyke

Television/radio coverage
- Network: CBS

The 9th People's Choice Awards, honoring the best in popular culture for 1982, were held in 1983. They were broadcast on CBS.

== Winners ==
Favorite Female Performer in a New TV Program: Patti Duke Astin

Favorite Motion Picture Actress: Jane Fonda, Katharine Hepburn

Favorite All-Around Female Entertainer: Barbara Mandrell

Favorite All-Around Male Entertainer: Burt Reynolds

Favorite New TV Dramatic Program: St. Elsewhere

Favorite TV Comedy Program: M*A*S*H

Favorite TV Dramatic Program: Hill Street Blues

Favorite Male Performer in a New TV Program: David Hasselhoff

Favorite Female TV Performer: Linda Evans, Loretta Swit

Favorite Male Musical Performer: Kenny Rogers

Favorite Motion Picture: E.T. the Extra-Terrestrial

Favorite Young Motion Picture Performer: Brooke Shields

Favorite TV Mini-Series: The Blue and the Gray

Favorite Country Music Performer: Kenny Rogers

Favorite Motion Picture Actor: Burt Reynolds

Favorite New Song: "Truly" "Eye of the Tiger"

Favorite New TV Comedy Program: Cheers

Favorite Male TV Performer: Tom Selleck

Favorite Young TV Performer: Gary Coleman
