= 17th People's Choice Awards =

Pop culture award show held in 1991

- Date: March 11, 1991
- Location: Universal Studios Hollywood, Universal City, California
- Hosted by: Burt Reynolds

Television/radio coverage
- Network: CBS

The 17th People's Choice Awards, honoring the best in popular culture for 1990, were held on March 11, 1991, at Universal Studios Hollywood, in Universal City, California. They were hosted by Burt Reynolds, and broadcast on CBS.

== Awards ==
Winners are listed first, in bold.

Favorite New TV Comedy	Favorite Female Musical Performer
**In Living Color**; **The Simpsons**; **The Fresh Prince of Bel-Air**	**Paula Abdul**; Janet Jackson; Madonna
Favorite Comedy Motion Picture	Favorite TV Mini-Series
**Pretty Woman**; Home Alone; Three Men and a Little Lady	**The Civil War**; It; Lucky Chances
Favorite Male TV Performer	Favorite Male Musical Performer
**Bill Cosby**; Ted Danson; Tom Selleck	**MC Hammer**; Phil Collins; Vanilla Ice
Favorite Young TV Performer	Favorite Female TV Performer
**Fred Savage**; Neil Patrick Harris; Raven Symone	**Kirstie Alley**; Candice Bergen; Phylicia Rashad
Favorite All-Around Male Entertainer	Favorite TV Comedy
**Bill Cosby**; Mel Gibson; Patrick Swayze	**Cheers**; The Cosby Show; Roseanne
Favorite TV Drama	Favorite Motion Picture Actor
**L.A. Law**; In the Heat of the Night; Knots Landing; Thirtysomething	**Mel Gibson**; Kevin Costner; Patrick Swayze
Favorite Dramatic Motion Picture	Favorite New Song
**Ghost**; Dances with Wolves; The Hunt for Red October	**Ice Ice Baby**; Love Takes Time; U Can't Touch This
Favorite Motion Picture Actress	Favorite News-Oriented Information Series
**Julia Roberts**; Kirstie Alley; Meryl Streep	**60 Minutes**; A Current Affair; 20/20
Favorite Male Performer In A New TV Series	Favorite Female Performer In A New TV Series
**Burt Reynolds**; James Earl Jones; Will Smith	**Carol Burnett**; Mayim Bialik; Sharon Gless; Marilu Henner
Favorite All-Around Female Entertainer	Favorite New TV Dramatic Series
**Julia Roberts**; Cher; Janet Jackson; Madonna	**Equal Justice**; Gabriel's Fire; Twin Peaks
