= My Name Is Barbra (book) =

2023 memoir

- Author: Barbra Streisand
- Language: English
- Genre: Autobiography
- Publisher: Viking Press
- Publication date: November 7, 2023
- Publication place: United States
- Pages: 970
- ISBN: 9780525429524
- OCLC: 1380998376

My Name Is Barbra is the autobiography of American entertainer Barbra Streisand. Released on November 7, 2023, the memoir spans 970 pages, while the audiobook, read by the author, exceeds 48 hours. Generally lauded for sparing no detail, reviews recognized Streisand as "the architect of her persona and performance."

== Background ==
Jacqueline Kennedy Onassis, while an editor at Doubleday, sought to publish Streisand's memoir in 1984. Streisand rejected the offer, feeling her age of 42 was too young, with more to achieve in her future. Streisand subsequently began making notes, then started a journal in longhand in 1999.

Viking Press announced in May 2015 that they would publish the long-awaited memoir, spanning Streisand's entire life and career, which was planned for release in 2017.

== Publication ==
The book's November 2023 release lacks an index, as Streisand hoped readers would engage with the book from beginning to end without browsing for specifics.

Streisand's audiobook recording includes ad-libs that vary from the written text, resulting in a "natural, intimate spoken narrative."

== Reception ==
Before its release, My Name Is Barbra became a bestseller during presales in February 2023. Following its publication, book sales topped Amazon.com charts, with overall US sales exceeding 55,000 copies during its first week. The book debuted at #2 on The New York Times Best Seller list.

Interview magazine subsequently compiled an index to the book's contents.

Streisand's lavish accounts of wardrobe and style details spurred a dedicated fashion interview.

The self-narrated audiobook was also well received, winning the 2025 Audie Award for Audiobook of the Year as well as the Audie Award for Autobiography or Memoir, in addition to earning a Grammy nomination for Best Audio Book, Narration & Storytelling Recording at the 67th Annual Grammy Awards.
