= 24th People's Choice Awards =

Pop culture award show held in 1998

- Date: January 11, 1998
- Location: Pasadena Civic Auditorium, Pasadena, California
- Hosted by: Reba McEntire and Ray Romano

Television/radio coverage
- Network: CBS

The 24th People's Choice Awards, honoring the best in popular culture for 1997, were held on January 11, 1998, at the Pasadena Civic Auditorium in Pasadena, California. They were hosted by Reba McEntire and Ray Romano, and broadcast on CBS.

Whoopi Goldberg received a special award for her work in the motion picture and television industry.

== Awards ==
Winners are listed first, in bold.

Favorite New TV Comedy	Favorite Female Musical Performer
**Veronica's Closet**; **Dharma & Greg**	**Whitney Houston**; **Reba McEntire**
Favorite Comedy Motion Picture	Favorite Daytime Serial
**Liar Liar**	**Days of Our Lives**
Favorite Male TV Performer	Favorite Male Musical Performer
**Tim Allen**	**Garth Brooks**
Favorite Female Performer In A New TV Series	Favorite Female TV Performer
**Kirstie Alley**	**Oprah Winfrey**
Favorite Motion Picture Actor	Favorite TV Comedy
**Harrison Ford**	**Seinfeld**
Favorite TV Drama	Favorite Motion Picture Actress
**ER**	**Julia Roberts**
Favorite Dramatic Motion Picture	Favorite Male Performer In A New TV Series
**Jerry Maguire**	**Tony Danza**
Favorite New TV Dramatic Series
**Brooklyn South**
