= 23rd People's Choice Awards =

Pop culture award show held in 1997

- Date: January 12, 1997
- Location: Pasadena Civic Auditorium, Pasadena, California
- Hosted by: Don Johnson and Roma Downey

Television/radio coverage
- Network: CBS

The 23rd People's Choice Awards, honoring the best in popular culture for 1996, were held on January 12, 1997, at the Pasadena Civic Auditorium in Pasadena, California. They were hosted by Don Johnson and Roma Downey, and broadcast on CBS.

The theme music is used for the pounding dance beats heard.

Rob Reiner received a special award for his work in the motion picture and television industry.

== Awards ==
Winners are listed first, in bold.

Favorite New TV Comedy	Favorite Female Musical Performer
Cosby	**Reba McEntire**
Favorite Comedy Motion Picture	Favorite Daytime Serial
The Nutty Professor	**Days of Our Lives**
Favorite Male TV Performer	Favorite Male Musical Performer
Tim Allen	**Garth Brooks**
Favorite Female Performer In A New TV Series	Favorite Female TV Performer
Brooke Shields	**Oprah Winfrey**
Favorite Motion Picture Actor	Favorite TV Comedy
Mel Gibson	**Seinfeld**
Favorite TV Drama	Favorite Motion Picture Actress
ER	**Sandra Bullock**
Favorite Dramatic Motion Picture	Favorite Male Performer In A New TV Series
Independence Day	**Bill Cosby**; **Michael J. Fox**
Favorite New TV Dramatic Series
Millennium
