= 22nd People's Choice Awards =

Pop culture award show held in 1996

- Date: March 10, 1996
- Location: Universal Studios Hollywood, Universal City, California
- Hosted by: Brett Butler

Television/radio coverage
- Network: CBS

The 22nd People's Choice Awards, honoring the best in popular culture for 1995, were held on March 10, 1996, at Universal Studios Hollywood, in Universal City, California. They were hosted by Brett Butler, and broadcast on CBS.

Michael Douglas received a special award for his work in the motion picture industry.

== Awards ==
Winners are listed first, in bold.

Favorite New TV Comedy	Favorite Female Musical Performer
**Caroline in the City**	**Reba McEntire**
Favorite Comedy Motion Picture	Favorite Rock Group
**Grumpier Old Men**	**Hootie & the Blowfish**
Favorite Male TV Performer	Favorite Male Musical Performer
**Tim Allen** – **Home Improvement**	**Garth Brooks**
Favorite Female Performer In A New TV Series	Favorite Female TV Performer
**Lea Thompson** – **Caroline in the City**	**Candice Bergen** – **Murphy Brown**
Favorite Motion Picture Actor	Favorite TV Comedy
**Tom Hanks**	**Seinfeld**
Favorite TV Drama	Favorite Motion Picture Actress
**ER**	**Sandra Bullock**
Favorite Dramatic Motion Picture	Favorite Male Performer In A New TV Series
**Apollo 13**	**Drew Carey** – **The Drew Carey Show**; **Jeff Foxworthy** – **The Jeff Foxworthy Show**
Favorite Actress In A Comedy Motion Picture	Favorite Actor In A Dramatic Motion Picture
**Whoopi Goldberg** – **Boys on the Side**	**Tom Hanks** – **Apollo 13**
Favorite Actor In A Comedy Motion Picture	Favorite Actress In A Dramatic Motion Picture
**Jim Carrey** – **Ace Ventura: When Nature Calls**	**Demi Moore** – **The Scarlet Letter**
Favorite Motion Picture	Favorite New TV Dramatic Series
**Apollo 13**	**Murder One**
