= Rescuers: Stories of Courage: Two Women =

Rescuers: Stories of Courage: Two Women is a 1997 television film directed by Peter Bogdanovich. It was executive produced by Barbra Streisand. It was followed by the sequels Rescuers: Stories of Courage: Two Couples (1998) co-directed by Tim Hunter and Lynne Littman and Rescuers: Stories of Courage: Two Families (1998) co-directed by Tony Bill and Tim Hunter.

== Plot ==
Two women try to save Jews from the Germans in World War Two. The story is told in two segments.

In "Mamusha" a Polish housekeeper Gertruda (Elizabeth Perkins) for a Jewish family who helps the mother and her 3-year-old boy flee Warsaw to safety. She then takes the boy to Palestine.

In "Woman on a Bicycle," a secretary (Sela Ward) at a Catholic Diocese in France helps protect a Jewish family.

== Cast ==
- Elizabeth Perkins
- Sela Ward
