= 16th People's Choice Awards =

Pop culture award show held in 1990

- Date: March 11, 1990
- Location: Universal Studios Hollywood, Universal City, California
- Hosted by: various

Television/radio coverage
- Network: CBS

The 16th People's Choice Awards, honoring the best in popular culture for 1989, were held on March 11, 1990, at Universal Studios Hollywood, in Universal City, California. They were hosted by various hosts including Barbara Mandrell and Valerie Harper. It was broadcast on CBS.

== Awards ==
Winners are listed first, in bold.

Favorite New TV Comedy	Favorite Female Musical Performer
**Doogie Howser, M.D.**; Coach; Major Dad	**Paula Abdul**; Debbie Gibson; Janet Jackson; Madonna
Favorite Comedy Motion Picture	World Favorite Motion Picture Actor
**Look Who's Talking**; National Lampoon's Christmas Vacation; When Harry Met Sally...	**Dustin Hoffman**
Favorite Male TV Performer	Favorite Male Musical Performer
**Bill Cosby**; Ted Danson; John Goodman; Peter Falk; Neil Patrick Harris	**Bobby Brown**
Favorite Young TV Performer	Favorite Female TV Performer
**Fred Savage**	**Roseanne Barr**; Phylicia Rashad; Candice Bergen
Favorite All-Around Male Entertainer	Favorite TV Comedy
**Bill Cosby**	**The Cosby Show**
Favorite TV Drama	Favorite Motion Picture Actor
**L.A. Law**; China Beach	**Tom Cruise**
Favorite Dramatic Motion Picture	Favorite Late Night Talk Show Host
**Steel Magnolias**; **Batman**	**Arsenio Hall**; David Letterman; Johnny Carson
Favorite Motion Picture Actress	World Favorite Motion Picture Actress
**Meryl Streep**; Kathleen Turner; Kim Basinger	**Meryl Streep**; Jane Fonda; Elizabeth Taylor
Favorite Male Performer In A New TV Series	Favorite Female Performer In A New TV Series
**Neil Patrick Harris**; Richard Chamberlain; Craig T. Nelson; Gerald McRaney	**Jamie Lee Curtis**; Ann Jillian; Corinne Bohrer; Stephanie Beacham
Favorite All-Around Female Entertainer	Favorite Motion Picture
**Roseanne Barr**; Bette Midler; Paula Abdul; Cher; Dolly Parton	**Batman**; Look Who's Talking; Steel Magnolias; Lethal Weapon 2
Favorite New TV Dramatic Series	Favorite Country Music Performer
**Rescue 911**	**Kenny Rogers**; **Randy Travis**
