= 25th People's Choice Awards =

Pop culture award show held in 1999

- Date: January 10, 1999
- Location: Pasadena Civic Auditorium, Pasadena, California
- Hosted by: Ray Romano

Television/radio coverage
- Network: CBS

The 25th People's Choice Awards, honoring the best in popular culture for 1998, was held on January 10, 1999, at the Pasadena Civic Auditorium in Pasadena, California. It was hosted by Ray Romano, and broadcast on CBS.

== Awards ==
Winners are listed first, in bold.

Favorite New TV Comedy	Favorite Female Musical Performer
**Jesse**; **Will & Grace**; The Hughleys	**Celine Dion**; Reba McEntire; Shania Twain
Favorite Motion Picture	Favorite Comedy Motion Picture
**Titanic**; Armageddon; Saving Private Ryan	**There's Something About Mary**; Dr. Dolittle; Rush Hour
Favorite Male TV Performer	Favorite Male Musical Performer
**Tim Allen**; Kelsey Grammer; Jerry Seinfeld	**Garth Brooks**; Alan Jackson; George Strait
Favorite All Time Musical Performer	Favorite All Time TV Star
**Elton John**	**Bill Cosby**
Favorite Female Performer In A New TV Series	Favorite Female TV Performer
**Christina Applegate**; Faith Ford; Keri Russell	**Helen Hunt**; Calista Flockhart; Oprah Winfrey
Favorite Motion Picture Actor	Favorite TV Comedy
**Tom Hanks**; Leonardo DiCaprio; Harrison Ford	**Frasier**; **Seinfeld**; Friends
Favorite TV Drama	Favorite Motion Picture Actress
**ER**; Law & Order; NYPD Blue	**Sandra Bullock**; Meryl Streep; Kate Winslet
Favorite All Time Motion Picture Star	Favorite Male Performer In A New TV Series
**Harrison Ford**	**Nathan Lane**; D. L. Hughley; Eric McCormack
Favorite New TV Dramatic Series	Favorite Dramatic Motion Picture
**L.A. Doctors**; Dawson's Creek; Felicity	**Titanic**; Good Will Hunting; Saving Private Ryan
