= 18th People's Choice Awards =

Pop culture award show held in 1992

- Date: March 17, 1992
- Location: Universal Studios Hollywood, Universal City, California
- Hosted by: Kenny Rogers

Television/radio coverage
- Network: CBS

The 18th People's Choice Awards, honoring the best in popular culture for 1991, were held on March 17, 1992, at Universal Studios Hollywood, in Universal City, California. They were hosted by Kenny Rogers, and broadcast on CBS.

Aaron Spelling received a special tribute to celebrate his long career in television.

== Awards ==
Winners are listed first, in bold.

Favorite New TV Comedy	Favorite Female Musical Performer
Home Improvement	Reba McEntire
Favorite Comedy Motion Picture	Favorite Female Performer In A Daytime Serial
City Slickers	Susan Lucci
Favorite Male TV Performer	Favorite Male Musical Performer
Bill Cosby – The Cosby Show	Garth Brooks
Favorite Female Country Music Performer	Favorite Female TV Performer
Reba McEntire	Candice Bergen – Murphy Brown
Favorite Male Country Music Performer	Favorite TV Comedy
Garth Brooks	The Cosby Show
Favorite TV Drama	Favorite Actor In A Dramatic Motion Picture
L.A. Law	Kevin Costner – JFK
Favorite Dramatic Motion Picture	Favorite Male Performer In A Daytime Serial
The Silence of the Lambs	Eric Braeden
Favorite Actor In A Comedy Motion Picture	Favorite Actress In A Dramatic Motion Picture
Steve Martin – L.A. Story	Julia Roberts – Dying Young
Favorite TV Series Among Young People	Favorite Actress In A Comedy Motion Picture
Beverly Hills 90210	Julia Roberts – Hook
Favorite Male Performer In A New TV Series	Favorite Female Performer In A New TV Series
Tim Allen – Home Improvement	Suzanne Somers – Step by Step
Favorite Motion Picture	Favorite New TV Dramatic Series
Terminator 2: Judgment Day	Homefront
