= As If We Never Said Goodbye =

1994 single by Barbra Streisand

Song by Andrew Lloyd Webber

from the album Sunset Boulevard
- Released: 1993
- Songwriters: Don Black; Christopher Hampton; Andrew Lloyd Webber

"As If We Never Said Goodbye" is a show tune from the musical Sunset Boulevard. It was written by Don Black, Christopher Hampton (with additional lyrics by Amy Powers), and Andrew Lloyd Webber. Ben Rimalower on Playbill calls it Andrew Lloyd Webber's greatest song.

In Sunset Boulevard, the main character, Norma Desmond, reveals her longing to return to the spotlight of fame.

The song has been performed by Barbra Streisand. It is featured on her album Back to Broadway and the live albums The Concert and Back to Brooklyn.

Elaine Paige recorded the song for her album Encore.

Countertenor Chris Colfer (as Kurt Hummel) sings the song in the Glee season 2 episode "Born This Way". A review in Salon describes Colfer's performance as turning the song "into a valentine to self-knowledge and self-improvement—and a young, gay singer's dream of treating the world as a stage and commanding it like a star."

English tenor Alfie Boe, recorded his version on his album “Bring Him Home” in 2010.

Jason Manford recorded the song for his 2017 album A Different Stage which was later used to open the 2020 Royal Variety Performance.

== Barbra Streisand version ==
"As If We Never Said Goodbye"

Single by Barbra Streisand

from the album Back to Broadway
- Released: January 14, 1994
- Genre: Musical; ballad
- Length: 4:45
- Label: Columbia Records
- Songwriters: Andrew Lloyd Webber; Don Black; Christopher Hampton

Barbra Streisand singles chronology
| "The Music of the Night" (1993) | "As If We Never Said Goodbye" (1994) | "I Finally Found Someone" (1996) |

Music video
- "As If We Never Said Goodbye" on YouTube

In 1994, American singer, songwriter, actress and director Barbra Streisand released her cover version of "As If We Never Said Goodbye". It is taken from Streisands twenty-sixth studio album, Back to Broadway (1993), and peaked at number 20 on the UK Singles Chart. The song is also featured on the live albums The Concert and Back to Brooklyn.

=== Critical reception ===
Sam Wood from Philadelphia Inquirer found that after premiering the song, taken from Andrew Lloyd Webber's Broadway adaptation of Sunset Boulevard, Streisand takes the opportunity to place "a proprietary stamp" on it. Richard Harrington from The Washington Post named "As If We Never Said Goodbye" the "standout" of Back to Broadway, writing, "Like many Lloyd Webber songs, it's maudlin, sentimental and faintly familiar - an assemblage of nostalgic reflections cannily crafted into a major statement through a melody that sweeps steadily toward its bravado finale. Streisand-as-Desmond sings "This world's waited long enough/ I've come home at last," and it's hard not to make a connection to commercial expectations for this album."

=== Charts ===
| Chart (1994) | Peak position |
|---|---|
| Europe (European Hot 100 Singles) | 48 |
| UK Singles (OCC) | 20 |
