= The Broadway Album =

Studio album by Barbra Streisand
- Released: November 4, 1985
- Recorded: Spring–Summer 1985
- Studios: A&M (Hollywood); Evergreen (Burbank); Lighthouse (North Hollywood); Randy Waldman (North Hollywood); Village Recorder (Los Angeles); Westlake (Los Angeles)
- Genres: Vocal pop; show tunes
- Length: 47:44
- Label: Columbia
- Producers: Richard Baskin; Bob Esty; David Foster; Paul Jabara; Peter Matz; Kim Skalecki; Barbra Streisand

Barbra Streisand chronology
Emotion (1984)	The Broadway Album (1985)	One Voice (1987)

Singles from Emotion
- 1. "Somewhere" Released: October 1985; 2. "Send In the Clowns" Released: March 1986

The Broadway Album is the twenty-fourth studio album by American singer Barbra Streisand, released by Columbia Records on November 4, 1985. Consisting mainly of classic show tunes, the album marked a major shift in Streisand's career. She had spent ten years appearing in musicals and singing standards on her albums in the 1960s. Beginning with the album Stoney End in 1971 and ending with the album Emotion in 1984, Streisand sang mostly rock, pop, folk, and disco-oriented songs for Columbia records. Noted Broadway composer Stephen Sondheim personally penned additional lyrics for the songs "Putting It Together" and "Send in the Clowns" on request of the singer. The album, originally released on the Columbia label and subsequently re-released by Columbia and Sony Records, was a critical and commercial success. First certified gold by the RIAA on January 13, 1986, it reached four times platinum on January 31, 1995.

The album was accompanied by a television special, Putting It Together: The Making of the Broadway Album. The original LP and cassette releases contained 11 tracks, while the CD release included the bonus track "Adelaide's Lament". Columbia re-released The Broadway Album in 2002 with an additional bonus track, originally cut in 1985, "I Know Him So Well". The album sold 7.5 million copies worldwide.

== Production ==
Streisand started her career on Broadway, and so considered this album in a sense returning to her roots, after two decades of recording popular music of the day. Streisand's record label, Columbia Records, objected to the planned content as it was not pop songs, but Streisand had signed a contract at the beginning of her career which gave her full creative control in exchange for lower earnings; at this point she stressed that, due to the contract, she had "the right to sing what I want to sing".

She considers the tracks music she has great respect for, deeming it some of the best music and lyrics ever written. The lead single, "Putting It Together" from Sondheim's Sunday in the Park with George, was rewritten to be about the dichotomy between art and commerce in the music industry. Streisand hired her previous The Way We Were director Sydney Pollack, as well as David Geffen, head of Geffen Records, to play the parts of the antagonistic studio heads. Streisand wanted to record the entire piece live to capture the atmosphere of Broadway shows. Many of the musicians also played in Funny Girl 22 years earlier, and a month of rehearsals with Stephen Sondheim was undertaken before recording.

The album's cover art was shot by photographer Richard Corman at the Plymouth Theatre in New York City in the summer of 1985. In addition to the photos used, showing Streisand sitting in a chair on the stage surrounded by sheet music, Corman shot additional portraits of her sitting in the seats.

== Reception and accolades ==
Professional ratings
Review scores
Source	Rating
AllMusic	link
Robert Christgau	C
Entertainment Weekly	A link

In 1993, Entertainment Weekly looked back nostalgically on the album as "the work of a supreme singer-actress still unspoiled enough to fall in love with the characters she sings". Writing at the time of the release, Rolling Stone took a slightly more cynical view, although after criticizing the album for its self-consciousness and overproduction, reviewer Francis Davis did concede that the album "works somehow, if only as a reminder of what a neglected wealth of riches Broadway offers and what a marvelous singer Streisand is when she's not trying to pass herself off as a rock star". New York Times reviewer Stephen Holden, once himself with Rolling Stone, had no such reservations, declaring shortly after the album's release that Streisand had "just released what may be the album of a lifetime". The album was ranked #37 on Entertainment Weekly's list of the "100 Greatest CDs", the fourth highest album by a female artist to appear on the list.

The album reached #1 on the US Billboard 200 chart in 1986, and earned Streisand a Grammy Award for Best Female Pop Vocal Performance and was nominated for Album of the Year. It launched two successful singles. "Send in the Clowns", from A Little Night Music, reached #25 on the "Adult Contemporary" chart. "Somewhere", a song from West Side Story, reached #5 on "Adult Contemporary" and also earned a Grammy for producer David Foster for "Best Instrumental Arrangement Accompanying Vocalist(s)/Best Background Arrangement". According to the liner notes of Streisand's retrospective box set, Just for the Record, the album also received a record certification in Australia.

== Track listing ==
1. "Putting It Together" (Stephen Sondheim) – 4:20
  - from Sunday in the Park with George, 1983
2. "If I Loved You" (Oscar Hammerstein II, Richard Rodgers) – 2:38
  - from Carousel, 1945
3. "Something's Coming" (Sondheim, Leonard Bernstein) – 2:55
  - from West Side Story, 1957
4. "Not While I'm Around" (Sondheim) – 3:29
  - from Sweeney Todd, 1979
5. "Being Alive" (Sondheim) – 3:23
  - from Company, 1970
6. "I Have Dreamed" / "We Kiss in a Shadow" / "Something Wonderful" (Hammerstein, Rodgers) – 4:50
  - from The King and I, 1951
7. "Adelaide's Lament" (Frank Loesser) – 3:25 (CD Bonus Track)
  - from Guys and Dolls, 1950
8. "Send In the Clowns" (Sondheim) – 4:42
  - from A Little Night Music, 1973
9. "Pretty Women" / "The Ladies Who Lunch" (Sondheim) – 5:09
  - from Sweeney Todd / Company
10. "Can't Help Lovin' That Man" (Hammerstein, Jerome Kern) – 3:31
  - from Show Boat, 1927
11. "I Loves You, Porgy" / "Porgy, I's Your Woman Now (Bess, You Is My Woman)" (George Gershwin, Ira Gershwin, DuBose Heyward) – 4:35
  - from Porgy and Bess, 1935
12. "Somewhere" (Sondheim, Bernstein) – 4:56
  - from West Side Story

Bonus track

13. "I Know Him So Well" [Session outtake] (Tim Rice, Benny Andersson, Björn Ulvaeus) – 4:14
  - from Chess, 1984

== Personnel ==
Information is based on liner notes.

Musicians

- Barbra Streisand – vocals
- Randy Waldman – synthesizers (1, 3, 8, 12), keyboards (12)
- Bob Esty – keyboards (6)
- Rhett Lawrence – keyboard programming (6)
- Randy Kerber – acoustic piano (8)
- David Foster – keyboards (12, 13), synthesizers (12, 13)
- Michael Boddicker – synthesizer programming (12)
- Oscar Castro-Neves – guitar (9)
- Neil Stubenhaus – bass (5)
- Chuck Berghofer – bass (7)
- Steve Schaeffer – drums (5)
- Sol Gubin – drums (7, 9)
- Paulinho da Costa – percussion (5, 9)
- Gary Herbig – alto saxophone solo (5)
- Brian O'Connor – French horn (2)
- Richard Todd – French horn (8)
- Earl Dumler – English horn, oboe (8)
- Stevie Wonder – harmonica (10)
- Jeremy Lubbock – strings (6)
- Israel Baker – concertmaster (8)
- Gerald Vinci – concertmaster (10)
- David Geffen – voice actor (1)
- Sydney Pollack – voice actor (1)
- Ken Sylk – voice actor (1)
- Richard Page – backing vocals (13)

Music arrangements and orchestrations

- Peter Matz – arrangements (1, 2, 5, 9, 11), conductor (1, 2, 5, 7, 9–11), orchestration (1, 5, 9, 10)
- Barbra Streisand – arrangements (1, 5, 9, 11)
- Richard Baskin – arrangements (3)
- Jerry Hey – horn arrangements (3)
- Randy Waldman – arrangements (3)
- Jeremy Lubbock – orchestrations and conductor (4, 8)
- Bob Esty – arrangements (6)
- Paul Jabara – arrangements (6)
- Sid Ramin – orchestrations (7)
- Conrad Salinger – original orchestrations (10)
- Alexander Courage – orchestrations (11)
- David Foster – arrangements (12, 13)

== Production credits ==
- Barbra Streisand – executive producer, producer (1, 2, 5–11)
- Peter Matz – executive producer, producer (1, 2, 5, 7, 9–11)
- Richard Baskin – producer (3, 4)
- Bob Esty – producer (6)
- Paul Jabara – producer (6)
- David Foster – producer (12)
- Don Hahn – recording engineer (1, 2, 4, 5, 7, 9–11), remixing (4)
- John Arrias – recording engineer (3, 6, 8), remixing (3, 6, 8, 10), mastering supervisor
- Humberto Gatica – recording engineer (12), remixing (1, 2, 5, 9, 11, 12)
- Benny Faccone – assistant engineer (1–11)
- Gregg Jampol – assistant engineer (1–11)
- Magic Moreno – assistant engineer (1–11), additional engineer (12)
- Jeffrey "Woody" Woodruff – assistant engineer (12)
- Laura Livingston – remix assistant
- Jay Willis – remix assistant
- Stewart Whitmore – digital editing
- Stephen Marcussen – mastering at Presicion Mastering (Hollywood, California)
- Kim Skalecki – production coordination
- Nancy Donald – art direction, design
- Tony Lane – art direction, design
- Richard Corman – photography
- Mark Sennet – liner photography
- Alan & Marilyn Bergman – liner notes

== Charts ==
=== Weekly charts ===
Chart (1985–87)	Peak position
Australian Albums (Kent Music Report)	8
Austrian Albums (Ö3 Austria)	29
Canada Top Albums/CDs (RPM)	11
Dutch Albums (Album Top 100)	8
European Albums (Eurotipsheet)	32
Japanese Albums (Oricon)	23
New Zealand Albums (RMNZ)	1
Swedish Albums (Sverigetopplistan)	26
UK Albums (Official Charts)	3
US Billboard 200	1

=== Year-end charts ===
Chart (1986)	Position
Canada Top Albums/CDs (RPM)	51
Dutch Albums (Album Top 100)	59
New Zealand Albums (RMNZ)	9
UK Albums (OCC)	43
US Billboard 200	12
US Cash Box	13

== Certifications and sales ==
Region	Certification	Certified units/sales
Australia (ARIA)	2× Platinum	140,000^{‡}
Canada (Music Canada)	2× Platinum	200,000^{^}
Netherlands (NVPI)	Gold	50,000^{^}
New Zealand (RMNZ)	Platinum	15,000^{^}
United Kingdom (BPI)	Gold	100,000^{^}
United States (RIAA)	4× Platinum	4,000,000^{^}
United States (RIAA) Video Longform	Gold	50,000^{^}
Summaries
Worldwide	—	7,500,000
^{^} Shipments figures based on certification alone.^{‡} Sales+streaming figures based on certification alone.

== Bibliography ==
- Audio reference for unreleased song "I Know Him So Well"
