= 2nd People's Choice Awards =

Pop culture award show held in 1976

- Date: February 19, 1976
- Hosted by: Jack Albertson, Army Archerd

Television/radio coverage
- Network: CBS

The 2nd People's Choice Awards, honoring the best in popular culture for 1975, were held in 1976. Taped at Santa Monica Civic Auditorium. They were broadcast on CBS.

== Appearances ==
- Jack Albertson
- Henry Fonda
- Tony Curtis
- Burt Lancaster
- Captain & Tennille
- George Burns
- Army Archerd
- Bea Arthur
- James Stewart
- Rod Steiger
- Roy Scheider
- Summer Bartholomew
- Lee Grant
- Brenda Vaccaro
- Henry Winkler
- Bonnie Franklin
- Gabe Kaplan
- Raymond Burr
- Ronee Blakley
- Earl Holliman
- James Brolin
- Maximilian Schell
- Glen Campbell
- Sally Kellerman
- Hal Linden
- Karen Black
- Olivia de Havilland
- Ann-Margret
- Robert Mitchum
- Pam Grier
- Kirk Douglas
- George Burns
- James Coburn
- Morris Albert

== Awards ==
Winners are listed first, in bold.

=== Movies ===
Favorite Movie
**Jaws**; Let's Do It Again; The Towering Inferno
Favorite Movie Actor	Favorite Movie Actress
**John Wayne**; Paul Newman; Robert Redford	**Katharine Hepburn**; Diana Ross; Barbra Streisand

=== Television ===
Favorite Male Television Performer	Favorite Female Television Performer
**Telly Savalas**; Alan Alda; Robert Blake	**Carol Burnett**; Cher; Angie Dickinson
Favorite All Around Male Entertainer	Favorite All Around Female Entertainer
**Bob Hope**; **Tony Orlando**; Johnny Carson	**Mary Tyler Moore**; **Carol Burnett**; Cher
Favorite Television Comedy Program	Favorite Television Drama
**All In The Family**; M*A*S*H; Sanford and Son	**The Waltons**; Starsky and Hutch; Kojak
Favorite New Television Show	Favorite Performer in a New Television Show
**Starsky and Hutch**; **Welcome Back Kotter**; Phyllis	**Robert Blake**; Gabe Kaplan; Cloris Leachman

=== Music ===
Favorite Song	Favorite Music Performer
**Captain and Tennille - "Love Will Keep Us Together"**; Morris Albert - "Feelings"; Glen Campbell - "Rhinestone Cowboy"	**John Denver**; Elton John; Lawrence Welk
