= 13th People's Choice Awards =

Pop culture award show held in 1987

- Date: March 14, 1987
- Hosted by: Dick Van Dyke

Television/radio coverage
- Network: CBS

The 13th People's Choice Awards, honoring the best in popular culture for 1986, were held in 1987. They were broadcast on CBS.

== Winners ==
Favorite Motion Picture Actress: Meryl Streep

Favorite TV Comedy Program: The Cosby Show

Favorite Country Music Performer: Kenny Rogers

Favorite Female Performer in a New TV Program: Pam Dawber

Favorite Female TV Performer: Cybill Shepherd

Favorite Game Show Host: Pat Sajak

Favorite New TV Comedy Program: ALF

Favorite All-Around Female Entertainer: Barbara Mandrell, Cybill Shepherd (tie)

Favorite Young TV Performer: Emmanuel Lewis

Favorite Motion Picture: Top Gun

Favorite Motion Picture Actor: Clint Eastwood

Favorite New TV Dramatic Program: L.A. Law

Favorite Nighttime Dramatic Serial: Dallas, Dynasty (tie)

Favorite TV Dramatic Program: Hill Street Blues

Favorite All-Around Male Entertainer: Bill Cosby

Favorite Female Musical Performer: Whitney Houston, Madonna (tie)

Favorite Male Musical Performer: Lionel Richie

Favorite Male Performer in a New TV Program: Andy Griffith

Favorite Male TV Performer: Bill Cosby

Favorite Music Video: "Dancing on the Ceiling"

Favorite Musical Group: Alabama

Favorite Talk Show Host: Johnny Carson
