= 4th People's Choice Awards =

Pop culture award show held in 1978

- Date: February 20, 1978

Television/radio coverage
- Network: CBS

The 4th People's Choice Awards, honoring the best in popular culture for 1977, were held in 1978. They were broadcast on CBS.

== Winners ==
Favorite Female Performer in a New TV Program: Suzanne Somers

Favorite Motion Picture: Star Wars

Favorite Motion Picture Actor: John Wayne

Favorite All-Around Male Entertainer: Bob Hope

Favorite New Song: "Boogie Nights", "You Light Up My Life"

Favorite New TV Comedy Program: Three's Company, The Love Boat

Favorite All-Around Female Entertainer: Carol Burnett

Favorite New TV Dramatic Program: Eight Is Enough

Favorite Motion Picture Actress: Barbra Streisand

Favorite TV Comedy Program: M*A*S*H

Favorite Male Musical Performer: Peter Frampton

Favorite Male Performer in a New TV Program: Dan Haggerty

Favorite Overall New TV Program: Eight Is Enough

Favorite TV Variety Program: The Carol Burnett Show

Favorite Male TV Performer: James Garner

Favorite TV Dramatic Program: Little House on the Prairie

Favorite Female TV Performer: Mary Tyler Moore
