= 3rd People's Choice Awards =

Pop culture award show held in 1977

- Date: February 10, 1977

Television/radio coverage
- Network: CBS

The 3rd People's Choice Awards, honoring the best in popular culture for 1976, were held in 1977. They were broadcast on CBS.

== Winners ==
Favorite All-Around Male Entertainer: Bob Hope

Favorite Female TV Performer: Mary Tyler Moore

Favorite TV Variety Program: The Carol Burnett Show

Favorite Male Musical Performer: John Denver

Favorite Motion Picture Actress: Barbra Streisand

Favorite Overall New TV Program: Charlie's Angels

Favorite All-Around Female Entertainer: Carol Burnett

Favorite Motion Picture: One Flew Over the Cuckoo's Nest

Favorite Female Performer in a New TV Program: Farrah Fawcett

Favorite Male TV Performer: Telly Savalas

Favorite TV Dramatic Program: Starsky & Hutch

Favorite TV Comedy Program: Happy Days

Favorite TV Special: 1976 Summer Olympics

Favorite Female Musical Performer: Olivia Newton-John

Favorite Male Performer in a New TV Program: Robert Conrad, Dick Van Dyke

Favorite Motion Picture Actor: John Wayne

Favorite New Song: "Beth", "Disco Duck"
