= 10th People's Choice Awards =

Pop culture award show held in 1984

- Date: March 15, 1984
- Hosted by: Andy Williams

Television/radio coverage
- Network: CBS

The 10th People's Choice Awards, honoring the best in popular culture for 1983, were held in 1984. They were broadcast on CBS.

== Winners ==
Favorite All-Around Female Entertainer: Barbara Mandrell, Barbra Streisand

Favorite Children's TV Program: Sesame Street

Favorite Female TV Performer: Linda Evans

Favorite TV Comedy Program: Three's Company

Favorite Male Performer in a New TV Program: Mr. T

Favorite TV Dramatic Program: Hill Street Blues, Dynasty

Favorite TV Mini-Series: The Thorn Birds

Favorite Theme/Song from a Motion Picture: "Flashdance... What a Feeling"

Favorite Young Motion Picture Performer: Brooke Shields

Favorite Female Performer in a New TV Program: Madeline Kahn

Favorite Motion Picture: Return of the Jedi

Favorite Motion Picture Actress: Meryl Streep

Favorite New TV Comedy Program: Webster

Favorite Country Music Performer: Kenny Rogers

Favorite Motion Picture Actor: Clint Eastwood, Burt Reynolds

Favorite New TV Dramatic Program: Hotel

Favorite Music Video: "Thriller"

Favorite All-Around Male Entertainer: Michael Jackson

Favorite Male TV Performer: Tom Selleck

Favorite Overall New TV Program: The A-Team

Favorite Young TV Performer: Emmanuel Lewis
