= People's Choice Awards =

American entertainer popularity award

- Previous: 49th People's Choice Awards; February 18, 2024; Next: 50th People's Choice Awards; 2027
- Sponsored by: Procter & Gamble (1982–2017); E! (2018–present)
- Country: United States
- First award: March 3, 1975; 51 years ago
- Website: https://www.votepca.com/

Television/radio coverage
- Network: CBS (1975–2017); E! (2018–present); NBC (2021–2024); Peacock (2024)

The People's Choice Awards is an American awards show, recognizing people in entertainment, voted online by the fans and general public. The show was held annually beginning in 1975, with the winners originally determined using Gallup Polls until a switch to online voting in 2005. The most recent show took place in February 2024.

The awards were created by Bob Stivers, who produced the first show in 1975. The first awards recognized The Sting as Favorite Picture of 1974, Barbra Streisand as the year's Favorite Film Actress, and John Wayne as its Favorite Film Actor. So far, Ellen DeGeneres and Taylor Swift are the most awarded people, with a total of 20 awards each.

In 1982, Stivers sold the People's Choice Awards to Procter & Gamble Productions (P&G); under P&G, the ceremony was broadcast by CBS, and Procter & Gamble's brands held exclusive national advertising time across the entire telecast.

In April 2017, the E! network announced that they had acquired the People's Choice Awards. The ceremony was initially shifted from a January scheduling to November to reduce its proximity to the busier months of awards season, but this was reverted for 2024 with a move to February. Since 2021, the ceremony has aired on E!'s sister broadcast network NBC. In September 2023, NBC also began to host the People's Choice Country Awards as a spin-off. In May 2026, it was announced that the awards show would return in 2027 and air on E!

== Categories ==
The award categories have varied over the years. For example, the 16th People's Choice Awards had categories including Favorite All-Around Movie (Batman), and both a Favorite Movie Actor (Tom Cruise) and a World Favorite Movie Actor (Dustin Hoffman). At the 23rd People's Choice Awards, Rob Reiner was named the People's Choice Awards Honoree. The 32nd People's Choice Awards (broadcast in January 2006) included categories such as Favorite On-Screen Match-Up (Vince Vaughn and Owen Wilson in Wedding Crashers), Favorite Leading Lady (Reese Witherspoon), Favorite Tour (U2), and an award named after a Procter & Gamble brand: Nice 'n Easy Fans Favorite Hair (Faith Hill). In 2008, the People's Choice Awards introduced a new category: Favorite Sci-Fi Show. The nominees were Stargate Atlantis, Battlestar Galactica, and Doctor Who. Stargate Atlantis was the first recipient of the award.

== Poll-based awards ==
In the 20th century, the awards were based on results from Gallup polls. Each year, Gallup took a survey of different categories for favorite actor, actress, movie, artist, television program or group. The scope was unlimited—the public could choose whomever or whatever it liked. The results of the annual survey were announced in the form of the People's Choice Awards. Since polls have margins of error, many years' awards have had ties in at least one category, when Gallup declared that the voting was so close that a single winner could not be chosen. For instance, in 2003, both Spider-Man and The Lord of the Rings: The Fellowship of the Ring were recognized as Favorite Motion Picture.

== Switch to online voting ==
The winners of the 31st People's Choice Awards (on January 9, 2005) were decided by online voting rather than Gallup polls. The nominees submitted for Internet voting were selected using an unpublished process involving editors at Entertainment Weekly, the show's production team and a panel of pop culture fans.

The nominees for the 32nd People's Choice Awards were determined by the web research company Knowledge Networks, which took a nationally representative sample of men and women ages 18 to 54, with and without Internet access, to come up with the nominees. After being presented with a list of candidates determined by national ratings averages, box office grosses and album sales, they had the option to write in their favorites. Knowledge Networks recruits its panel by using a RDD phone recruitment method and provides a web TV and Internet access to households without Internet access enabling them to infer back to the entire population.

The nominees for the 2010 People's Choice Awards were determined by the media research company Visible Measures, which specializes in measuring Internet video audience behavior. The announcement of this partnership stated,

"For the first time ever, the People's Choice Awards has incorporated Internet video viewing data into the initial nominee selection process, depending on Visible Measures True Reach metrics to objectively measure online video popularity. [...] Visible Measures worked with the People's Choice Awards to determine each potential nominees' popularity on a True Reach basis, a unique measure of the total audience that has been exposed to an online video campaign – regardless of how widely the campaign spreads or where it appears. To measure True Reach, Visible Measures deploys a robust and patented set of technologies with the goal of capturing the universe of Internet video viewership data in near real-time."

== Former categories ==
These are some of the past categories for the People's Choice Awards:

=== Movies ===
- Favorite Movie
- Favorite Movie Actor
- Favorite Movie Actress
- Favorite Action Movie
- Favorite Action Movie Actor
- Favorite Action Movie Actress
- Favorite Animated Movie
- Favorite Animated Movie Voice
- Favorite Cast
- Favorite Comedy Movie
- Favorite Comedic Movie Actor
- Favorite Comedic Movie Actress
- Favorite Dramatic Movie
- Favorite Dramatic Movie Actor
- Favorite Dramatic Movie Actress
- Favorite Family Movie
- Favorite Horror Movie
- Favorite Thriller Movie
- Favorite Year End Movie
- Favorite Year-End Blockbuster
- Favorite Sci-Fi/Fantasy Movie
- Favorite Movie Icon
- Favorite Movie Duo
- Favorite Movie Fan Following
- Favorite Movie Franchise
- Favorite Movie Superhero
- Favorite Face of Heroism
- Favorite On Screen Movie Chemistry
- Favorite Book Adaptation
- Favorite Movie Star Under 25
- Favorite Independent Movie
- Favorite Breakout Movie Actor
- Favorite Breakout Movie Actress
- Favorite On Screen Team

=== Digital ===
- Favorite Comedic Collaboration
- Favorite Online Sensation
- Favortie User-Generated Video
- Favorite Social Media Celebrity
- Favorite Social Media Star
- Favorite Viral Video Star
- Favorite Mobile Game
- Favorite Video Game
- Favorite YouTube Star
- Favorite Star Under 35
- Favorite Web Celeb
- CBS.com's Favorite Digital Obsession
- The DailyMail.com Seriously Popular Award
- Best Dad in Movies

=== Music ===
- Favorite Song
- Favorite Album
- Favorite Remake
- Favorite Male Singer
- Favorite Female Singer
- Favorite Male Musical Performer
- Favorite Female Musical Performer
- Favorite All Time Musical Performer
- Favorite Musical Group or Band
- Favorite Music Video
- Favorite Song from a Movie
- Favorite Tour
- Favorite Tour Headliner
- Favorite Pop Song
- Favorite Rock Song
- Favorite Hip-Hop Song
- Favorite R&B Song
- Favorite Country Song
- Favorite Song from a Soundtrack
- Favorite Group
- Favorite Combined Forces
- Favorite Breakout Music Artist
- Favorite Rock Band
- Favorite Pop Artist
- Favorite Country Artist
- Favorite Country Group
- Favorite R&B Artist
- Favorite Hip-Hop Artist
- Favorite Male Artist
- Favorite Female Artist
- Favorite Male Country Artist
- Favorite Female Country Artist
- Favorite Music Icon
- Favorite Music Collaboration
- Favorite Alternative/Rock Band
- Favorite Rock Group

=== Television ===
- Favorite TV Show
- Favorite TV Comedy
- Favorite TV Drama
- Favorite Male TV Performer
- Favorite Female TV Performer
- Favorite Male Performer In A New TV Series
- Favorite Female Performer In A New TV Series
- Favorite Network TV Comedy
- Favorite Comedy TV Actor
- Favorite Comedy TV Actress
- Favorite Network TV Drama
- Favorite Dramatic TV Actor
- Favorite Dramatic TV Actress
- Favorite Cable TV Comedy
- Favorite Cable TV Drama
- Favorite Cable TV Actor
- Favorite Cable TV Actress
- Favorite Premium Cable TV Show
- Favorite Premium Cable TV Actor
- Favorite Premium Cable TV Actress
- Favorite TV Crime Drama
- Favorite Horror Show
- Favorite Crime Drama TV Actor
- Favorite Crime Drama TV Actress
- Favorite Network Sci-Fi/Fantasy Show
- Favorite Cable Sci-Fri/Fantasy Show
- Favorite Sci-Fi/Fantasy Actor
- Favorite Sci-Fi/Fantasy Actress
- Favorite Competition TV Show
- Favorite Daytime TV Host
- Favorite Daytime TV Hosting Team
- Favorite Late Night Talk Show Host
- Favorite Streaming Series
- Favorite TV Bromance
- Favorite TV Gal Pals
- Favorite TV Movie/Miniseries
- Favorite TV Anti-Hero
- Favorite TV Hero
- Favorite TV Icon
- Favorite TV Duo
- Favorite TV Character We Miss Most
- Favorite Actor in a New TV Series
- Favorite Actress in a New TV Series
- Favorite Animated TV Show
- Favorite Cartoon Show
- Favorite New TV Comedy
- Favorite New TV Drama
- Favorite On Screen TV Chemistry
- Favorite Series We Miss Most
- Favorite New Talk Show Host
- Favorite Celebrity Judge
- Favorite TV Celebreality Star
- Favorite TV Guest Star
- Favorite TV Fan Following
- Favorite Scene Stealing Star
- Favorite Scene Stealing Guest Star
- Favorite Game Show
- Favorite Competition/Reality Show
- Favorite TV Obsession
- Favorite TV Chef
- Favorite TV Guilty Pleasure
- Favorite Family TV Movie
- Favorite Sketch Comedy TV Show

== Current categories ==
The first ceremony in 1975 had 14 categories. In 2016, 74 categories were established.

As of 2018, these are the current categories:

=== Movies ===
- Movie of the Year
- Family Movie of the Year
- Comedy Movie of the Year
- Action Movie of the Year
- Drama Movie of the Year
- Drama Movie Star of the Year
- Male Movie Star of the Year
- Female Movie Star of the Year
- Comedy Movie Star of the Year
- Action Movie Star of the Year
- Movie Performance of the Year
- Animated Movie Star of the Year

=== Pop Culture ===
- Social Star of the Year
- Beauty Influencer of the Year
- Social Celebrity of the Year
- Animal Star of the Year
- Comedy Act of the Year
- Style Star of the Year
- Game Changer/Athlete of the Year
- Pop Podcast of the Year
- Video Game of the Year
- Video of the Year

=== Television ===
- Show of the Year
- Drama Show of the Year
- Comedy Show of the Year
- Revival Show of the Year
- Reality Show of the Year
- Competition Show of the Year
- Male TV Star of the Year
- Female TV Star of the Year
- Drama TV Star of the Year
- Comedy TV Star of the Year
- Daytime Talk Show of the Year
- Nighttime Talk Show of the Year
- Competition Contestant of the Year
- Reality TV Star of the Year
- Bingeworthy Show of the Year
- Sci-Fi/Fantasy Show of the Year
- TV Performance of the Year
- Host of the Year

=== Music ===
- Male Artist of the Year
- Female Artist of the Year
- Group of the Year
- Song of the Year
- Album of the Year
- Male Country Artist of the Year
- Female Country Artist of the Year
- Male Latin Artist of the Year
- Female Latin Artist of the Year
- New Artist of the Year
- Collaboration Song of the Year
- Soundtrack Song of the Year
- Pop Artist of the Year
- Hip-Hop Artist of the Year
- R&B Artist of the Year
- Music Video of the Year
- Concert Tour of the Year

=== Special awards ===
==== People's Voice ====
- 2013: Christina Aguilera

==== People's Icon ====
- 2018: Melissa McCarthy
- 2019: Jennifer Aniston
- 2020: Jennifer Lopez
- 2021: Halle Berry
- 2022: Ryan Reynolds
- 2024: Adam Sandler

==== People's Music Icon ====
- 2021: Christina Aguilera
- 2022: Shania Twain

== Ceremonies ==
#	Date	Host	#	Date	Host	#	Date	Host
1st	March 3, 1975	Army Archerd & Richard Crenna	21st	March 5, 1995	Tim Daly & Annie Potts	41st	January 7, 2015	Anna Faris & Allison Janney
2nd	February 19, 1976	Jack Albertson	22nd	March 10, 1996	Brett Butler	42nd	January 6, 2016	Jane Lynch
3rd	February 10, 1977	Dick Van Dyke	23rd	January 12, 1997	Don Johnson & Roma Downey	43rd	January 18, 2017	Joel McHale
4th	February 20, 1978	—N/a	24th	January 11, 1998	Reba McEntire & Ray Romano	44th	November 11, 2018	—N/a
5th	March 7, 1979	Army Archerd & Dick Van Dyke	25th	January 13, 1999	Ray Romano	45th	November 10, 2019	—N/a
6th	January 24, 1980	Mariette Hartley & Bert Parks	26th	January 9, 2000	Don Johnson & Cheech Marin	46th	November 15, 2020	Demi Lovato
7th	March 8, 1981	Army Archerd & Lee Remick	27th	January 7, 2001	Kevin James	47th	December 7, 2021	Kenan Thompson
8th	March 18, 1982	Army Archerd & John Forsythe	28th	January 13, 2002	Kevin James	48th	December 6, 2022	Kenan Thompson
9th	March 17, 1983	Dick Van Dyke	29th	January 12, 2003	Tony Danza	49th	February 18, 2024	Simu Liu
10th	March 15, 1984	Andy Williams	30th	January 11, 2004	Charlie Sheen & Jon Cryer			
11th	March 12, 1985	John Forsythe	31st	January 9, 2005	Jason Alexander & Malcolm-Jamal Warner			
12th	March 13, 1986	John Denver	32nd	January 10, 2006	Craig Ferguson			
13th	March 14, 1987	Dick Van Dyke	33rd	January 9, 2007	Queen Latifah			
14th	March 13, 1988	Carl Reiner	34th	January 8, 2008	Queen Latifah			
15th	August 23, 1989	Michael Landon & Michele Lee	35th	January 7, 2009	Queen Latifah			
16th	March 11, 1990	Valerie Harper, Fred Savage, Army Archerd & Barbara Mandrell	36th	January 6, 2010	Queen Latifah			
17th	March 11, 1991	Burt Reynolds	37th	January 5, 2011	Queen Latifah			
18th	March 17, 1992	Kenny Rogers	38th	January 11, 2012	Kaley Cuoco			
19th	March 17, 1993	John Ritter & Jane Seymour	39th	January 9, 2013	Kaley Cuoco			
20th	March 8, 1994	Paul Reiser	40th	January 8, 2014	Beth Behrs & Kat Dennings			

== People's Choice Country Awards ==
On March 9, 2023, NBC announced the People's Choice Country Awards, a spin-off focusing on country music. The inaugural ceremony was held on September 28, 2023, at the Grand Ole Opry House in Nashville, Tennessee, and was hosted by Little Big Town. As of 2024, Zach Bryan is the most nominated act of the ceremony with 24 nominations, while Beyoncé is the most nominated female act of the award show with 17.

=== Ceremonies ===
#	Date	Host
1st	September 28, 2023	Little Big Town
2nd	September 26, 2024	Shania Twain

=== Categories ===
- People's Artist of the Year
- Album of the Year
- Female Artist of the Year
- Male Artist of the Year
- Group/Duo of the Year
- New Artist of the Year
- Song of the Year
- Female Song of the Year
- Male Song of the Year
- Group/Duo Song of the Year
- Collaboration Song of the Year
- Cover Song of the Year
- Crossover Song of the Year
- New Artist Song of the Year
- Storyteller Song of the Year
- Music Video of the Year
- Concert Tour of the Year
- Social Country Star of the Year

=== Special awards ===
==== Country Icon Award ====
- Toby Keith (2023)
- Miranda Lambert (2024)

==== Country Champion Award ====
- Wynonna Judd (2023)
- Kane Brown (2024)

== See also ==
- People's Choice Awards Australia
- People's Choice Awards India
