= 15th People's Choice Awards =

Pop culture award show held in 1989

- Date: August 23, 1989
- Hosted by: Michael Landon and Michele Lee

Television/radio coverage
- Network: CBS

The 15th People's Choice Awards, honoring the best in popular culture for 1988, were held in 1989. They were broadcast on CBS.

== Winners ==
FAVORITE ACTRESS IN A DRAMATIC MOTION PICTURE Meryl Streep

FAVORITE ALL-AROUND FEMALE STAR Cher

FAVORITE MALE MUSICAL PERFORMER Randy Travis

FAVORITE FEMALE MUSICAL PERFORMER Whitney Houston

FAVORITE MUSIC VIDEO "Smooth Criminal"

FAVORITE FEMALE PERFORMER IN A NEW TV SERIES Roseanne Barr

FAVORITE NEW TV COMEDY PROGRAM Roseanne

FAVORITE TV MINI-SERIES War and Remembrance

FAVORITE FAVORITE MOTION PICTURE Gone With The Wind

FAVORITE ACTOR IN A COMEDY MOTION PICTURE Eddie Murphy

FAVORITE ACTOR IN A DRAMATIC MOTION PICTURE Dustin Hoffman

FAVORITE FEMALE TV PERFORMER Phylicia Rashad

FAVORITE MALE PERFORMER IN A NEW TV SERIES John Goodman

FAVORITE NEW TV DRAMATIC PROGRAM China Beach

FAVORITE ALL-AROUND MALE STAR Bill Cosby

FAVORITE ACTRESS IN A COMEDY MOTION PICTURE Bette Midler

FAVORITE MALE TV PERFORMER Bill Cosby

FAVORITE TV COMEDY PROGRAM The Cosby Show

FAVORITE TV DRAMATIC PROGRAM L.A. Law

FAVORITE YOUNG TV PERFORMER Kirk Cameron

FAVORITE FAVORITE TV PROGRAM The Cosby Show

FAVORITE COMEDY MOTION PICTURE Big, Twins (tie)

FAVORITE DRAMATIC MOTION PICTURE Rain Man
