= 12th People's Choice Awards =

Pop culture award show held in 1986

- Date: March 13, 1986
- Hosted by: John Denver

Television/radio coverage
- Network: CBS

The 12th People's Choice Awards, honoring the best in popular culture for 1985, were held in 1986. They were broadcast on CBS.

== Winners ==
Favorite New Song (presented by Gladys Knight): "We Are the World"

Favorite New TV Dramatic Program (presented by Ted Knight and Meredith Baxter): Dynasty II - The Colbys

Favorite All-Around Female Entertainer (presented by Don Johnson): Barbara Mandrell, Meryl Streep

Favorite All-Around Male Entertainer (presented by Sammy Davis Jr.): Bill Cosby

Favorite Country Music Performer (presented by Michele Lee and Capt. Jim Fagerstrom, one of two "audience member" presenters): Kenny Rogers

Favorite Male Musical Performer (presented by John Denver): Bruce Springsteen

Favorite Female Musical Performer (presented by Lisa Hartman): Madonna

Favorite Male TV Performer (presented from New York by Whoopi Goldberg): Bill Cosby

Favorite Motion Picture (presented by Rod Steiger): Back to the Future

Favorite Motion Picture Actress (presented by James Garner): Meryl Streep

Favorite Female Performer in a New TV Program (presented by Henry Winkler and Cheryl Ladd): Cybill Shepherd

Favorite New TV Comedy Program (presented by Don Ameche): The Golden Girls

Favorite Female TV Performer (presented by Robert Wagner and audience member Marina Simpanas): Linda Evans

Favorite TV Dramatic Program (presented by Richard Crenna and Linda Gray): Dynasty, Miami Vice

Favorite Young TV Performer (presented by Tim Conway and Harvey Korman): Emmanuel Lewis

Favorite Classical Music Performer (presented by John Denver): Luciano Pavarotti

Favorite TV Comedy Program (also presented by Whoopi Goldberg): The Cosby Show

Favorite Male Performer in a New TV Program (presented by Victoria Principal): Bruce Willis

Favorite Motion Picture Actor (presented by Charlton Heston): Sylvester Stallone
