= 14th People's Choice Awards =

Pop culture award show held in 1988

- Date: March 13, 1988
- Hosted by: Carl Reiner

Television/radio coverage
- Network: CBS

The 14th People's Choice Awards, which honored the best in popular culture for 1987, were held in 1988. They were broadcast on CBS.

== Winners ==
Favorite Female Performer in a New TV Program: Dolly Parton

Favorite New TV Dramatic Program: Thirtysomething

Favorite TV Dramatic Program: L.A. Law

Favorite Young TV Performer: Kirk Cameron, Keshia Knight Pulliam (tie)

Favorite Female TV Performer: Cybill Shepherd

Favorite Male Musical Performer: Kenny Rogers

Favorite Motion Picture Actress: Glenn Close

Favorite All-Around Male Entertainer: Bill Cosby

Favorite Comedy Motion Picture: Three Men and a Baby

Favorite Dramatic Motion Picture: Fatal Attraction

Favorite Female Musical Performer: Whitney Houston

Favorite Male Performer in a New TV Program: John Ritter

Favorite All-Time Motion Picture Star: Clint Eastwood

Favorite All-Time Song: "Somewhere My Love (Lara's Theme)"

Favorite Rock Group: Bon Jovi

Favorite TV Comedy Program: The Cosby Show

Favorite All-Time TV Star: Bill Cosby

Favorite All-Time Musical Star: Barbra Streisand

Favorite Male TV Performer: Bill Cosby

Favorite Motion Picture Actor: Michael Douglas

Favorite All-Around Female Entertainer: Dolly Parton

Favorite New TV Comedy Program: A Different World, My Two Dads (tie)

Favorite Talk Show Host: Oprah Winfrey
