= 7th People's Choice Awards =

Pop culture award show held in 1981

- Date: March 8, 1981
- Hosted by: Army Archerd and Lee Remick

Television/radio coverage
- Network: CBS

The 7th People's Choice Awards, honoring the best in popular culture for 1980, were held in 1981. They were broadcast on CBS.

== Winners ==
Favorite All-Around Female Entertainer: Carol Burnett

Favorite Female Musical Performer: Pat Benatar

Favorite Male TV Performer: Alan Alda

Favorite Male Musical Performer: Kenny Rogers

Favorite Female Performer in a New TV Program: Diana Canova

Favorite New TV Comedy Program: Too Close for Comfort

Favorite Young TV Performer: Gary Coleman

Favorite Young Motion Picture Performer: Brooke Shields

Favorite Motion Picture: The Empire Strikes Back

Favorite Female TV Performer: Carol Burnett

Favorite Motion Picture Actress: Jane Fonda, Goldie Hawn

Favorite TV Dramatic Program: Dallas

Favorite TV Mini-Series: Shōgun

Favorite Song from a Motion Picture: "9 to 5"

Favorite Male Performer in a New TV Program: Tom Selleck

Favorite New Song: "Lady"

Favorite All-Around Male Entertainer: Alan Alda

Favorite Motion Picture Actor: Clint Eastwood

Favorite New TV Dramatic Program: Magnum, P.I.

Favorite TV Comedy Program: M*A*S*H
