= 11th People's Choice Awards =

Pop culture award show held in 1985

- Date: March 12, 1985
- Hosted by: John Forsythe

Television/radio coverage
- Network: CBS

The 11th People's Choice Awards, honoring the best in popular culture for 1984, were held in 1985. They were broadcast on CBS.

== Winners ==
Favorite Motion Picture Actress: Meryl Streep

Favorite Children's TV Program: Sesame Street

Favorite Female Performer in a New TV Program: Phylicia Rashad, Angela Lansbury

Favorite Motion Picture Actor: Clint Eastwood

Favorite Country/Western Music Performer: Kenny Rogers

Favorite All-Around Male Entertainer: Eddie Murphy, Tom Selleck

Favorite Female TV Performer: Joan Collins, Linda Evans

Favorite TV Dramatic Program: Dynasty

Favorite Male TV Performer: Tom Selleck

Favorite New TV Comedy Program: The Cosby Show

Favorite Young TV Performer: Emmanuel Lewis

Favorite Entertainer: Bob Hope

Favorite New TV Dramatic Program: Miami Vice

Favorite All-Around Female Entertainer: Barbara Mandrell

Favorite Female Musical Performer: Barbara Mandrell

Favorite Male Performer in a New TV Program: Bill Cosby

Favorite Motion Picture: Beverly Hills Cop

Favorite New Song: "Purple Rain"

Favorite TV Comedy Program: The Cosby Show
