= One Voice (Barbra Streisand album) =

Live album by Barbra Streisand
- Released: April 20, 1987
- Recorded: September 6, 1986
- Venues: Streisand's Malibu, California home
- Genre: Pop
- Length: 49:48
- Label: Columbia
- Producer: Richard Baskin

Barbra Streisand chronology
The Broadway Album (1985)	One Voice (1987)	Nuts (1987)

Professional ratings
Review scores
Source	Rating
AllMusic	3/5 stars

One Voice is the third live album released by Barbra Streisand. Her first full-length concert in twenty years, One Voice began as a benefit performance at Streisand's home in Malibu, California, on September 6, 1986. The concert was broadcast on HBO in December that year, followed by the album's release in April 1987.

The album contains Streisand's only recordings of two Harold Arlen classics "Over the Rainbow" and "It's a New World" as well as her version of "America the Beautiful".

The concert and album raised millions for Democratic candidates and for charities committed to anti-nuclear activities and the preservation of our environment, civil liberties, and human rights.

== Track listing ==
1. "Somewhere" (Leonard Bernstein, Stephen Sondheim) – 3:19
2. "Evergreen" (Barbra Streisand, Paul Williams) – 3:01
3. "Something's Coming" (Leonard Bernstein, Stephen Sondheim) – 4:12
4. "People" (Bob Merrill, Jule Styne) – 4:49
5. "Send in the Clowns" (Stephen Sondheim) – 4:38
6. "Over the Rainbow" (Harold Arlen, Yip Harburg) – 3:41
7. "Guilty" (Barry Gibb, Maurice Gibb, Robin Gibb) Duet with Barry Gibb – 5:25
8. "What Kind of Fool" (Barry Gibb, Albhy Galuten) Duet with Barry Gibb – 4:31
9. "Papa, Can You Hear Me? (Michel Legrand, Alan Bergman, Marilyn Bergman) – 4:32
10. "The Way We Were (Alan Bergman, Marilyn Bergman, Marvin Hamlisch) – 3:48
11. "It's a New World" (Harold Arlen, Ira Gershwin) – 3:03
12. "Happy Days Are Here Again" (Milton Ager, Jack Yellen) – 4:42
13. "America the Beautiful" (Katharine Lee Bates, Samuel A. Ward) – 5:02

== Video release ==
The concert was produced as an HBO television special, broadcast December 27, 1986. The One Voice album, VHS home video and NTSC Laserdisc of the concert were released in April 1987. A DVD release of One Voice appeared in 2006. The concert footage includes some of the many celebrities in attendance, as well as bits of Robin Williams performing an ad-libbed monologue to open the show.

== Personnel ==
- Barbra Streisand – vocals
- Barry Gibb - vocals (Tracks 7–8)
- Randy Kerber – keyboards, piano, conductor, musical director
- Jim Cox – synthesizers
- Dan Sawyer – acoustic guitar, electric guitar
- Randy Waldman – synthesizers
- Chad Wackerman – drums
- Michael G. Fisher – percussion and sound effects
- Nyle Steiner - Steinerphone (EWI)
- John Pierce – bass guitar, Moog bass
- Richard Marx – backing vocals
- Richard Baskin - producer

== Charts ==
=== Weekly charts ===
Chart (1987)	Peak position
Australian Albums Chart	15
Canada Top Albums/CDs (RPM)	28
Dutch Albums (Album Top 100)	2
European Albums (Music & Media)	47
Finnish Albums (Suomen virallinen lista)	30
German Albums (Offizielle Top 100)	32
Japanese Albums (Oricon)	93
New Zealand Albums (RMNZ)	7
Spanish Albums (Promusicae)	18
Swedish Albums (Sverigetopplistan)	33
UK Albums (Official Charts)	27
US Billboard 200	9

=== Year-end charts ===
Chart (1987)	Position
New Zealand Albums (RMNZ)	31
US Cash Box	41

== Certifications and sales ==
One Voice has been certified Platinum in the United States and New Zealand for sales of 1,000,000 and 15,000 copies. According to the liner notes of Barbra's retrospective box set: Just for the Record, the album also received a record certification in Australia, Canada, the Netherlands and the United Kingdom.

Region	Certification	Certified units/sales
Australia (ARIA)	Gold	35,000^{^}
Canada (Music Canada)	Gold	50,000^{^}
Netherlands (NVPI)	Platinum	100,000^{^}
New Zealand (RMNZ)	Platinum	15,000^{^}
United Kingdom (BPI)	Silver	60,000^{^}
United States (RIAA)	Platinum	1,000,000^{^}
^{^} Shipments figures based on certification alone.
