= 1st People's Choice Awards =

Pop culture award show held in 1975

- Date: March 3, 1975
- Hosted by: Richard Crenna

Television/radio coverage
- Network: CBS

The 1st People's Choice Awards, honoring the best in popular culture for 1974, was held in 1975 and broadcast on CBS.

== Presenters ==
- Richard Crenna
- Army Archerd
- Bob Hope
- Lynn Anderson
- Jimmy Cohn
- Jacqueline Bisset
- Brenda Vaccaro
- Sammy Davis Jr.
- Raquel Welch
- Faye Dunaway
- Alan Alda
- Barbra Streisand
- Carol Burnett
- Michael Landon
- Wayne Rogers
- Ted Knight
- Shirley Jones
- Ann-Margret
- Natalie Wood
- Robert Wagner
- Dyan Cannon
- Danny Thomas
- Valerie Braun
- George Segal
- Cher

== Awards ==
Winners are listed first, in bold. Due to the Gallop Poll used, some votes resulted in ties.

=== Movies ===
Favorite Motion Picture
**The Sting**
Favorite Motion Picture Actress	Favorite Motion Picture Actor
**Barbra Streisand**; Faye Dunaway; Raquel Welch	**John Wayne**; Marlon Brando; Paul Newman; Robert Redford

=== Television ===
Favorite Television Comedy Program	Favorite Dramatic Television Program
**All in the Family**; Good Times; Sanford and Son	**The Waltons**; **Kojak**
Favorite Female Television Performer	Favorite Male Television Performer
**Mary Tyler Moore**; Carol Burnett; Valerie Harper	**Alan Alda (tie)**; **Telly Savalas (tie)**; Peter Falk
Favorite All-Around Female Performer	Favorite All-Around Male Performer
**Carol Burnett**; Mary Tyler Moore; Barbra Streisand	**Bob Hope**; Johnny Carson; Sammy Davis Jr.
Favorite Television Variety Show
**The Carol Burnett Show**; Tony Orlando and Dawn; The Lawrence Welk Show

=== Music ===
Favorite Male Singer	Favorite Female Performer
**Mac Davis**; John Denver; Elton John	**Olivia Newton-John (tie)**; Barbra Streisand; **Lynn Anderson (tie)**; Helen Reddy
Favorite Musical Group
**The Osmond Brothers**; **Chicago**; Tony Orlando and Dawn

=== Others ===
Favorite Outstanding Sports Figure
- **Hank Aaron (tie)**
- **Joe Namath (tie)**
- Billie Jean King
