= 6th People's Choice Awards =

Pop culture award show held in 1980

- Date: January 24, 1980
- Location: Hollywood Palladium, Hollywood, California
- Hosted by: Mariette Hartley and Bert Parks

Television/radio coverage
- Network: CBS

The 6th People's Choice Awards, honoring the best in popular culture for 1979, were held in Hollywood on January 24, 1980. They were broadcast on CBS.

== Winners ==
The categories and winners:

Favorite Motion Picture Rocky II

Favorite New Song, Age 12-21 "Babe"

Favorite All-Around Male Entertainer Alan Alda

Favorite Female Performer In A New TV Program Stefanie Powers

Favorite Motion Picture Actress Jane Fonda

Favorite All-Around Female Entertainer Carol Burnett

Favorite TV Dramatic Program Dallas

Favorite Young TV Performer Gary Coleman

Favorite Male Performer In A New TV Program Robert Wagner

Favorite Male TV Performer Alan Alda

Favorite New TV Dramatic Program Hart to Hart

Favorite TV Comedy Program M*A*S*H

Favorite Female TV Performer Carol Burnett

Favorite Motion Picture Actor Burt Reynolds

Favorite Theme/Song From A Motion Picture "The Main Event/Fight"

Favorite Young Motion Picture Actress Kristy McNichol
