= List of awards and nominations received by Jane Fonda =

Jane Fonda awards and nominations
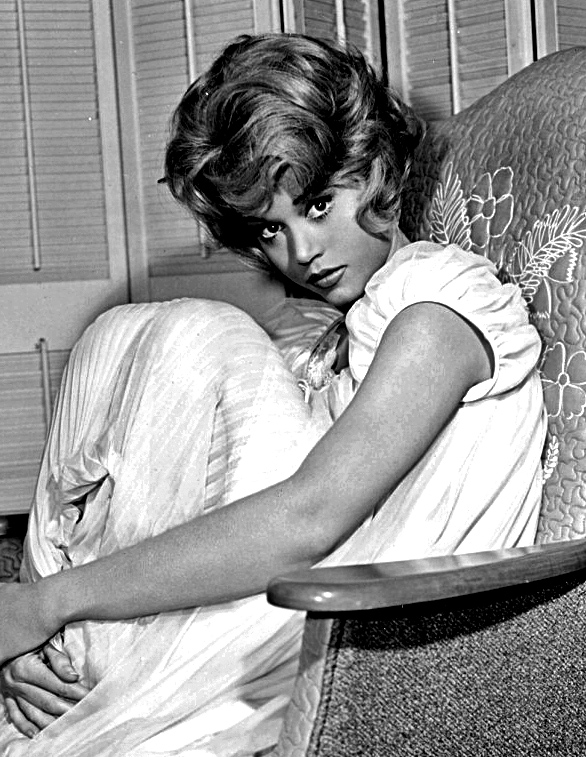
- Jane Fonda in 1962 promoting the comedy-drama Period of Adjustment.
Awards and nominations
Award	Wins	Nominations
Academy Awards	2	7
Actor Awards	0	4
British Academy Film Awards	2	7
Primetime Emmy Awards	1	5
Golden Globe Awards	7	15
Grammy Awards	0	1
Tony Awards	0	2

Totals (Note: Certain award groups do not simply award one winner. They acknowledge several different recipients, have runners-up, and have third place. Since this is a specific recognition and is different from losing an award, runner-up mentions are considered wins in this award tally. For simplification and to avoid errors, each award in this list has been presumed to have had a prior nomination.)
- Wins: 66
- Nominations: 115

Jane Fonda is an American actress and activist. She has been the recipient of numerous accolades including two Academy Awards, two British Academy Film Awards, a Primetime Emmy Award and seven Golden Globe Awards, along with nominations for four Actor Awards, two Tony Awards, and a Grammy Award.

Fonda began her career by performing in film and Broadway theatres in early 1960s. For her debut theatre role in There Was a Little Girl (1960) she was nominated for the Tony Award for Best Featured Actress in a Play and won the Theatre World Award. For her debut film role in Tall Story (1960) she received the Golden Globe Award for New Star of the Year – Actress. In the following years, she received two nominations for the BAFTA Award for Best Foreign Actress and three nominations for the Golden Globe Award for Best Actress in a Motion Picture – Musical or Comedy. She gained critical acclaim for They Shoot Horses, Don't They? (1969), for which she received her first nomination for Academy Award for Best Actress, along with nominations for the BAFTA Award for Best Actress in a Leading Role and the Golden Globe Award for Best Actress in a Motion Picture – Drama. She received her first Academy Award and second Golden Globe Award for Klute (1971). She won her second Academy Award for Coming Home (1978) and received additional nominations for Julia (1977), The China Syndrome (1979), On Golden Pond (1981) and The Morning After (1986) She also won BAFTA Awards for Julia and The China Syndrome, as well as Golden Globe Awards for Julia and Coming Home. In television, she received the Primetime Emmy Award for Outstanding Lead Actress in a Limited Series or Special for the television film The Dollmaker (1984).

In 1991, she retired from the film industry. After returning in 2005, she appeared in multiple films and television series. She was nominated for the Tony Award for Best Actress in a Play for 33 Variations (2009). In 2012–2014 she had a recurring role in the HBO television series The Newsroom, for which she received two nominations for the Primetime Emmy Award for Outstanding Guest Actress in a Drama Series. In 2015–2022, she starred in the Netflix television series Grace and Frankie, for which she received a nomination for the Primetime Emmy Award for Outstanding Lead Actress in a Comedy Series and three nominations for the Screen Actors Guild Award for Outstanding Performance by a Female Actor in a Comedy Series.

She has received multiple numerous honorary accolades including Career Achievement Award from National Board of Review (2005), Honorary Palme d'Or at the Cannes Film Festival (2007), AFI Life Achievement Award (2014), Golden Lion for Lifetime Achievement at the Venice Film Festival (2017), Golden Globe Cecil B. DeMille Award (2021) and Screen Actors Guild Life Achievement Award (2025).

Key
†	Indicates non-competitive categories

== Major associations ==
=== Academy Awards ===
Year	Category	Work	Result	Ref.
1970	Best Actress	They Shoot Horses, Don't They?	Nominated	
1972	Best Actress	Klute	Won	
1978	Best Actress	Julia	Nominated	
1979	Best Actress	Coming Home	Won	
1980	Best Actress	The China Syndrome	Nominated	
1982	Best Supporting Actress	On Golden Pond	Nominated	
1987	Best Actress	The Morning After	Nominated	

=== Actor Awards ===
Year	Category	Work	Result	Ref.
2014	Outstanding Cast in a Motion Picture	The Butler	Nominated (Note: Shared with the cast.)	
2017	Outstanding Female Actor in a Comedy Series	Grace and Frankie	Nominated	
2018	Outstanding Female Actor in a Comedy Series	Grace and Frankie	Nominated	
2019	Outstanding Female Actor in a Comedy Series	Grace and Frankie	Nominated	
2025	Screen Actors Guild Life Achievement Award †	—N/a	Honored	

=== American Film Institute ===
Year	Category	Work	Result	Ref.
2014	AFI Life Achievement Award †	—N/a	Honored	

=== BAFTA Awards ===
Year	Category	Work	Result	Ref.
British Academy Film Awards
1966	Best Foreign Actress	Cat Ballou	Nominated	
1968	Best Foreign Actress	Barefoot in the Park	Nominated	
1971	Best Actress in a Leading Role	They Shoot Horses, Don't They?	Nominated	
1972	Best Actress in a Leading Role	Klute	Nominated	
1979	Best Actress in a Leading Role	Julia	Won	
1980	Best Actress in a Leading Role	The China Syndrome	Won	
1983	Best Actress in a Supporting Role	On Golden Pond	Nominated	
Britannia Awards
2019	Stanley Kubrick Britannia Award for Excellence in Film †	—N/a	Honored	

=== Emmy Awards ===
Year	Category	Work	Result	Ref.
Primetime Emmy Awards
1984	Outstanding Lead Actress in a Limited Series or a Special	The Dollmaker	Won	
1995	Outstanding Informational Series	A Century of Women	Nominated	
2013	Outstanding Guest Actress in a Drama Series	The Newsroom	Nominated	
2014	Outstanding Guest Actress in a Drama Series	The Newsroom	Nominated	
2017	Outstanding Lead Actress in a Comedy Series	Grace and Frankie	Nominated	

=== Golden Globe Awards ===
Year	Category	Work	Result	Ref.
1962	New Star of the Year – Actress	Tall Story	Won	
1963	Best Actress in a Motion Picture – Musical or Comedy	Period of Adjustment	Nominated	
1966	Best Actress in a Motion Picture – Musical or Comedy	Cat Ballou	Nominated	
1967	Best Actress in a Motion Picture – Musical or Comedy	Any Wednesday	Nominated	
1970	Best Actress in a Motion Picture – Drama	They Shoot Horses, Don't They?	Nominated	
1972	Best Actress in a Motion Picture – Drama	Klute	Won	
1973	World Film Favorites	—N/a	Won	
1978	Best Actress in a Motion Picture – Drama	Julia	Won	
1979	Best Actress in a Motion Picture – Drama	Coming Home	Won	
1979	World Film Favorites	—N/a	Won	
1980	Best Actress in a Motion Picture – Drama	The China Syndrome	Nominated	
1980	World Film Favorites	—N/a	Won	
1982	Best Supporting Actress – Motion Picture	On Golden Pond	Nominated	
1985	Best Actress – Miniseries or Television Film	The Dollmaker	Nominated	
2016	Best Supporting Actress – Motion Picture	Youth	Nominated	
2021	Cecil B. DeMille Award †	—N/a	Honored	

=== Grammy Awards ===
Year	Category	Work	Result	Ref.
1984	Best Spoken Word or Non-Musical Recording	Jane Fonda's Work Out Record for Pregnancy, Birth and Recovery	Nominated (Note: Shared with Femmy De Lyser.)	

=== Tony Awards ===
Year	Category	Work	Result	Ref.
1960	Best Featured Actress in a Play	There Was a Little Girl	Nominated	
2009	Best Actress in a Play	33 Variations	Nominated	

== Miscellaneous awards ==
Awards and nominations received by Jane Fonda
Award	Year (Note: The listed year refers to the date of the ceremony.)	Category	Work	Result	Ref.
AARP Movies for Grownups Awards	2015	Best Actress	This Is Where I Leave You	Nominated	
AARP Movies for Grownups Awards	2016	Best Supporting Actress	Youth	Nominated	
ACLU of Southern California	2025	Impact Entertainment Visionaries Award †	Committee for the First Amendment	Won	
Alliance of Women Film Journalists	2024	She Deserves a New Agent	Book Club: The Next Chapter	Won (Note: Shared with Candice Bergen, Diane Keaton and Mary Steenburgen for the same film, tied with Toni Collette for Mafia Mamma.)	
CableACE Award	1992	Best Informational or Documentary Host	Fonda on Fonda	Nominated	
Cannes Film Festival	2007	Honorary Palme d'Or †	—N/a	Won	
Cannes Film Festival	2015	Woman in Motion Award †	—N/a	Won	
Critics' Choice Television Awards	2013	Best Guest Performer in a Drama Series	The Newsroom	Won	
David di Donatello	1978	Best Foreign Actress	Julia	Won (Note: Tied with Simone Signoret for Madame Rosa.)	
Dorian Awards	2016	TV Performance of the Year – Actress	Grace and Frankie	Nominated	
Dorian Awards	2016	Timeless Star †	—N/a	Won	
Drama Desk Awards	2009	Outstanding Actress in a Play	33 Variations	Nominated	
Drama League Awards	2009	Distinguished Performance	33 Variations	Nominated	
The DVF Awards	2026	Honoree †	—N/a	Won	
Elle Women in Hollywood	2008	Elle Women in Hollywood Award †	—N/a	Won	
Environmental Media Association	2018	EMA Lifetime Achievement Award †	—N/a	Won	
Film Society of Lincoln Center	2001	Chaplin Award †	—N/a	Won	
German Sustainability Award Foundation (Note: With endorsement of Federal Government of Germany.)	2019	The National German Sustainability Award †	—N/a	Won	
Golden Apple Awards	1970	Sour Apple	—N/a	Won	
Golden Apple Awards	1970	Female Star of the Year	—N/a	Won	
Golden Boot Awards	1993	Golden Boot Award †	—N/a	Won	
Golden Raspberry Awards	1990	Worst Actress	Old Gringo	Nominated	
Goldene Kamera	2017	Lifetime Achievement Award †	—N/a	Won	
Gracie Awards	2014	Outstanding Female Actor in a Featured or Guest Role	The Newsroom	Won	
Hasty Pudding Theatricals	1961	Hasty Pudding Woman of the Year	—N/a	Won	
Hollywood Film Awards	2015	Supporting Actress Award	Youth	Won	
International Cinematographers Guild Awards	1982	Motion Picture Showmanship Award †	—N/a	Won	
Kansas City Film Critics Circle	1970	Best Actress	They Shoot Horses, Don't They?	Won	
Kansas City Film Critics Circle	1971	Best Actress	Klute	Won	
Karlovy Vary International Film Festival	1986	Best Actress	Agnes of God	Won (Note: Shared with Anne Bancroft and Meg Tilly for the same film.)	
Katharine Hepburn Cultural Arts Center	2025	Spirit of Katharine Hepburn Award †	—N/a	Won	
Los Angeles Film Critics Association	1977	Best Actress	Julia	Runner-up	
Los Angeles Film Critics Association	1978	Best Actress	Comes a Horseman, Coming Home and California Suite	Won	
Los Angeles Press Club	2014	Visionary Award †	—N/a	Won	
Lumière Festival	2018	Lumière Award †	—N/a	Won	
Martha Heasley Cox Center for Steinbeck Studies	2023	John Steinbeck Award †	—N/a	Won	
NAACP Image Awards	1971	Outstanding Actress in a Motion Picture	Klute	Won	
National Board of Review	2005	Career Achievement Award †	—N/a	Won	
National Corporate Theatre Fund	2009	Theatre Artist Award †	—N/a	Won	
National Society of Film Critics	1971	Best Actress	Klute	Won	
National Society of Film Critics	1977	Best Actress	Julia	3rd place	
National Society of Film Critics	1978	Best Actress	Comes a Horseman, Coming Home and California Suite	2th place	
New York Film Critics Circle	1969	Best Actress	They Shoot Horses, Don't They?	Won	
New York Film Critics Circle	1971	Best Actress	Klute	Won	
New York Film Critics Circle	1978	Best Actress	Coming Home	3rd place	
New York Film Critics Circle	1978	Best Actress	Comes a Horseman	4th place	
New York Women's Agenda	2009	Elinor Guggenheimer Lifetime Achievement Award †	—N/a	Won	
People's Choice Awards	1979	Favorite Motion Picture Actress	—N/a	Nominated	
People's Choice Awards	1980	Favorite Motion Picture Actress	—N/a	Won	
People's Choice Awards	1981	Favorite Motion Picture Actress	—N/a	Won (Note: Tied with Goldie Hawn.)	
People's Choice Awards	1982	Favorite Motion Picture Actress	—N/a	Won (Note: Tied with Sally Field.)	
People's Choice Awards	1983	Favorite Motion Picture Actress	—N/a	Won (Note: Tied with Katharine Hepburn.)	
People's Choice Awards	1987	Favorite Motion Picture Actress	—N/a	Nominated	
People's Choice Awards	2017	Favorite Premium Series Actress	—N/a	Nominated	
Producers Guild of America Awards	2019	Stanley Kramer Award †	—N/a	Won	
Public Counsel	2025	William O. Douglas Award †	—N/a	Won	
Santa Barbara International Film Festival	2015	Kirk Douglas Award †	—N/a	Won	
Satellite Awards	2016	Best Actress in a Supporting Role	Youth	Nominated	
Savannah Film Festival	2001	Lifetime Achievement Award †	—N/a	Won	
Teen Choice Awards	2005	Choice Movie: Sleazebag	Monster-in-Law	Nominated	
Teen Choice Awards	2005	Choice Movie: Chemistry	Monster-in-Law	Nominated (Note: Shared with Jennifer Lopez.)	
Teen Choice Awards	2005	Choice Movie: Hissy Fit	Monster-in-Law	Nominated	
Teen Choice Awards	2005	Choice Movie: Liar	Monster-in-Law	Nominated	
Theatre World Awards	1960	Theatre World Award	There Was a Little Girl	Won	
Traverse City Film Festival	2018	Lifetime Achievement Award †	—N/a	Won	
USC School of Dramatic Arts	2014	Robert Redford Award for Engaged Artists †	—N/a	Won	
Venice Film Festival	2017	Golden Lion for Lifetime Achievement †	—N/a	Won	
Women Film Critics Circle	2019	Acting and Activism Award †	—N/a	Won	
Women in Film Honors	1981	Crystal Award †	—N/a	Won	
Women in Film Honors	2021	Jane Fonda Humanitarian Award (Note: Previously known as Norma Zarky Humanitarian Award, it was renamed in 2021 while honoring Fonda.) †	—N/a	Won	

== Honors ==
Organization	Year	Honor	Ref(s)
The California Museum	2008	California Hall of Fame	
Council of Paris	2010	Medal of the City of Paris	
Hollywood Chamber of Commerce	2025	Hollywood Walk of Fame	
National Women's Hall of Fame	2019	National Women's Hall of Fame	

== See also ==
- Jane Fonda filmography
- List of actors with two or more Academy Awards in acting categories
- List of actors with Academy Award nominations
- List of actors with more than one Academy Award nomination in the acting categories
- List of stars on the Hollywood Walk of Fame
- List of actors with Hollywood Walk of Fame motion picture stars
