= Jane Fonda filmography =

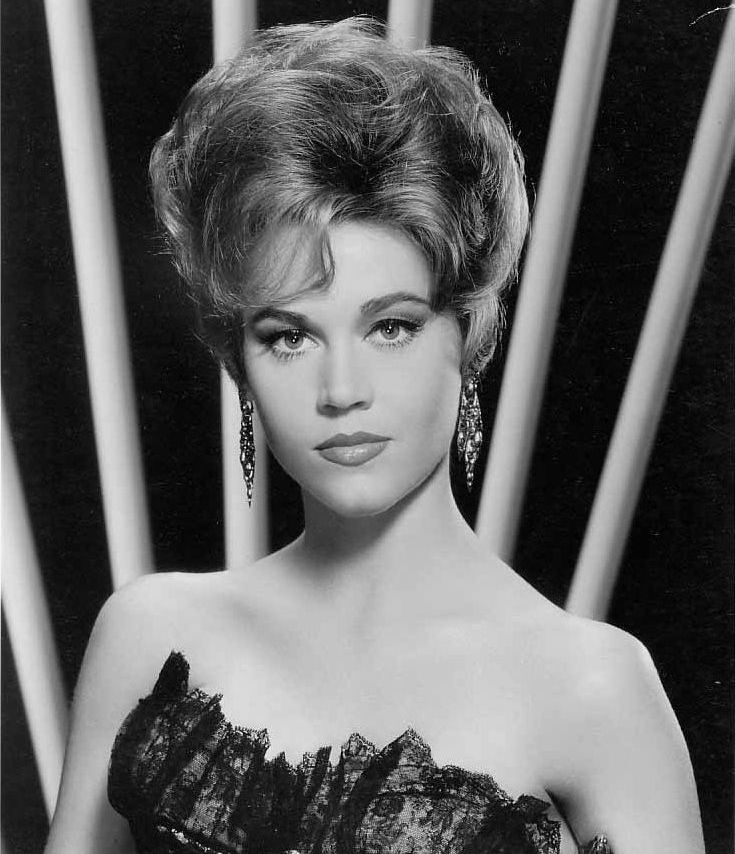
Fonda in 1963 promoting the romantic comedy Sunday in New York.

The following is a complete filmography of an American actress Jane Fonda.

Her early roles included the western comedy Cat Ballou (1965), the romantic comedy Barefoot in the Park (1967), the science fiction film Barbarella (1968), and the psychological drama They Shoot Horses, Don't They? (1969) for which Fonda received her first Academy Award nomination. In 1971, Fonda starred in Alan J. Pakula's thriller Klute portraying a prostitute, a role which won her the Academy Award for Best Actress. In 1977, she showed her range starring in the broad comedy Fun with Dick and Jane, and the Holocaust drama Julia. The following year, she starred in Hal Ashby's Vietnam War drama Coming Home (1978) opposite Jon Voight. She received her second Academy Award for Best Actress.

Fonda continued acting in films such as California Suite (1978), The China Syndrome and The Electric Horseman (both 1979). In 1980, Fonda starred in the smash hit comedy 9 to 5 alongside Lily Tomlin and Dolly Parton. The satirical film revolves around three working women dealing with sexual harassment and discrimination in the workplace. The following year, Fonda starred in and produced On Golden Pond (1981). Fonda appeared with father Henry Fonda and Katharine Hepburn in the film. She continued to appear in the dramas Agnes of God (1985), The Morning After (1986), and Stanley & Iris (1990).

After a 15-year absence from the screen, she starred in the romantic comedy Monster-in-Law (2005), a commercial success which rejuvenated her acting career. She acted in the comedies Georgia Rule (2007), Peace, Love & Misunderstanding (2012), and This Is Where I Leave You (2015). She portrayed Nancy Reagan in the Lee Daniels' civil rights drama The Butler (2013). She also starred in Youth (2015), Our Souls at Night (2017), and Book Club (2018).

In 1984, she won the Primetime Emmy Award for Outstanding Lead Actress in a Limited or Anthology Series or Movie for the ABC television film The Dollmaker. Fonda also became known for her roles on television including portraying Leona Lansing in Aaron Sorkin's HBO political drama series The Newsroom (2013–2015). She received two Primetime Emmy Award for Outstanding Guest Actress in a Drama Series nominations for her performance. She also reunited with Lily Tomlin, both starring in the Netflix comedy series Grace and Frankie (2015–2022). For her performance she received a Primetime Emmy Award for Outstanding Lead Actress in a Comedy Series nomination.

== Filmography ==
Key
| † | Denotes works that have not yet been released |

=== Film ===
| Year | Title | Role | Director | Notes |
|---|---|---|---|---|
| 1960 | Tall Story | June Ryder | Joshua Logan | |
| 1962 | Walk on the Wild Side | Kitty Twist | Edward Dmytryk | |
| 1962 | The Chapman Report | Kathleen Barclay | George Cukor | |
| 1962 | Period of Adjustment | Isabel Haverstick | George Roy Hill | |
| 1963 | In the Cool of the Day | Christine Bonner | Robert Stevens | |
| 1963 | Sunday in New York | Eileen Tyler | Peter Tewksbury | |
| 1964 | Joy House | Melinda | René Clément | |
| 1964 | Circle of Love | Sophie | Roger Vadim | |
| 1965 | Cat Ballou | Catherine 'Cat' Ballou | Elliot Silverstein | |
| 1966 | The Chase | Anna Reeves | Arthur Penn | |
| 1966 | The Game Is Over | Renee Saccard | Roger Vadim | |
| 1966 | Any Wednesday | Ellen Gordon | Robert Ellis Miller | |
| 1967 | Hurry Sundown | Julie Ann Warren | Otto Preminger | |
| 1967 | Barefoot in the Park | Corie Bratter | Gene Saks | |
| 1968 | Spirits of the Dead | Countess Frédérique de Metzengerstein | Federico Fellini, Louis Malle, Roger Vadim | |
| 1968 | Barbarella | Barbarella | Roger Vadim | |
| 1969 | They Shoot Horses, Don't They? | Gloria Beatty | Sydney Pollack | |
| 1971 | Klute | Bree Daniels | Alan J. Pakula | |
| 1972 | Tout Va Bien | Suzanne | Jean-Luc Godard, Jean-Pierre Gorin | |
| 1973 | Steelyard Blues | Iris Caine | Alan Myerson | |
| 1973 | A Doll's House | Nora Helmer | Joseph Losey | |
| 1976 | The Blue Bird | The Night | George Cukor | |
| 1977 | Fun with Dick and Jane | Jane Harper | Ted Kotcheff | |
| 1977 | Julia | Lillian Hellman | Fred Zinnemann | |
| 1978 | Coming Home | Sally Bender Hyde | Hal Ashby | |
| 1978 | Comes a Horseman | Ella Connors | Alan J. Pakula | |
| 1978 | California Suite | Hannah Warren | Herbert Ross | |
| 1979 | The China Syndrome | Kimberly Wells | James Bridges | |
| 1979 | The Electric Horseman | Alice 'Hallie' Martin | Sydney Pollack | |
| 1980 | 9 to 5 | Judy Bernly | Colin Higgins | |
| 1981 | On Golden Pond | Chelsea Thayer Wayne | Mark Rydell | |
| 1981 | Rollover | Lee Winters | Alan J. Pakula | |
| 1984 | Terror in the Aisles | Bree Daniels | Andrew J. Kuehn | clips from Klute |
| 1985 | Agnes of God | Dr. Martha Livingston | Norman Jewison | |
| 1986 | The Morning After | Alexandra "Alex" Sternbergen / Viveca Van Loren | Sidney Lumet | |
| 1989 | Old Gringo | Harriet Winslow | Luis Puenzo | |
| 1990 | Stanley & Iris | Iris Estelle King | Martin Ritt | |
| 2005 | Monster-in-Law | Viola Fields | Robert Luketic | |
| 2007 | Georgia Rule | Georgia Randall | Garry Marshall | |
| 2011 | All Together | Jeanne | Stéphane Robelin | |
| 2011 | Peace, Love & Misunderstanding | Grace | Bruce Beresford | |
| 2013 | The Butler | Nancy Reagan | Lee Daniels | |
| 2014 | Better Living Through Chemistry | Herself / The Narrator | David Postmentier, Geoff Moore | |
| 2014 | This Is Where I Leave You | Hilary Altman | Shawn Levy | |
| 2015 | Youth | Brenda Morel | Paolo Sorrentino | |
| 2015 | Fathers and Daughters | Teddy Stanton | Gabriele Muccino | |
| 2017 | Our Souls at Night | Addie Moore | Ritesh Batra | |
| 2018 | Book Club | Vivian | Bill Holderman | |
| 2022 | Luck | Babe | Peggy Holmes | Voice |
| 2022 | Moving On | Claire | Paul Weitz | |
| 2023 | 80 for Brady | Trish | Kyle Marvin | |
| 2023 | Book Club: The Next Chapter | Vivian | Bill Holderman | |
| 2023 | Ruby Gillman, Teenage Kraken | Grandmamah Gillman | Kirk DeMicco | Voice |
| 2024 | This Is Me... Now: A Love Story | Sagittarius | Dave Meyers | |
| TBA | In Love † | | Paul Weitz | Filming |

Source: Turner Classic Movies

=== Television ===
| Year | Title | Role | Notes |
|---|---|---|---|
| 1961 | A String of Beads | Gloria Winters | Television film |
| 1982 | Lily for President? | Judy Bernly | Television special |
| 1982 | 9 to 5 | O'Neil | Episode: "The Security Guard" |
| 1984 | The Dollmaker | Gertie Nevels | Television film |
| 2012–2014 | The Newsroom | Leona Lansing | 10 episodes |
| 2014 | The Simpsons | Maxine Lombard | Voice, episode: "Opposites A-Frack" |
| 2015–2022 | Grace and Frankie | Grace Hanson | 94 episodes; also executive producer |
| 2016 | Elena and the Secret of Avalor | Shuriki | Voice, television film |
| 2017–2020 | Elena of Avalor | Shuriki | Voice, 10 episodes |
| 2020 | The Ellen DeGeneres Show | Herself (guest host) | Episode: "January 17, 2020" |
| 2020 | Who Wants to Be a Millionaire? | Herself (contestant) | Episode: "Nikki Glaser, Jane Fonda & Anthony Anderson" |
| 2020 | Make It Work! | Herself | Television special |
| 2021–2022 | Stoner Cats | Ms. Stoner | Voice, 7 episodes |
| 2026 | The Comeback | Herself | Episode: "Valerie Has a Secret" |

=== Documentaries ===
| Year | Title | Role |
|---|---|---|
| 1972 | Letter to Jane | Herself |
| 1972 | F.T.A. | Herself |
| 1974 | Introduction to the Enemy | Herself |
| 1981 | Sois belle et tais-toi (Be Pretty and Shut Up) | Herself |
| 1990 | The Earth Day Special | Helen |
| 2000 | Generation 2000: Changing Girls' Realities | Herself |
| 2002 | Searching for Debra Winger | Herself |
| 2003 | V-Day: Until the Violence Stops | Herself |
| 2011 | Miss Representation | Herself |
| 2018 | Jane Fonda in Five Acts | Herself |
| 2019 | Alan Pakula: Going for Truth | Herself |
| 2020 | 9to5: The Story of a Movement | Herself |
| 2024 | The Greatest Love Story Never Told | Herself |
| 2026 | Gaslit | Herself |

== Exercise videos ==
| Year | Title | Notes |
|---|---|---|
| 1982 | Jane Fonda's Workout | aka Workout Starring Jane Fonda |
| 1983 | Jane Fonda's Pregnancy, Birth and Recovery Workout | |
| 1984 | Jane Fonda's Workout Challenge | |
| 1984 | Jane Fonda's Prime Time Workout | Re-released as Jane Fonda's Easy Going Workout |
| 1985 | Jane Fonda's New Workout | |
| 1986 | Jane Fonda's Low Impact Aerobic Workout | |
| 1987 | Jane Fonda's Sports Aid | |
| 1987 | Jane Fonda's Workout with Weights | Re-released as Jane Fonda's Toning and Shaping |
| 1987 | Start Up with Jane Fonda | Re-released as Jane Fonda’s Start Up |
| 1988 | Jane Fonda's Complete Workout | |
| 1989 | Jane Fonda's Light Aerobics and Stress Reduction Program | Re-released as Jane Fonda's Stress Reduction Program |
| 1990 | Jane Fonda's Lean Routine | |
| 1990 | Jane Fonda's Workout Presents Fun House Fitness: The Swamp Stomp | |
| 1990 | Jane Fonda's Workout Presents Fun House Fitness: The Fun House Funk | |
| 1991 | Jane Fonda's Lower Body Solution | |
| 1992 | Jane Fonda's Step Aerobic and Abdominal Workout | |
| 1993 | Jane Fonda's Favorite Fat Burners | |
| 1993 | Jane Fonda's Pregnancy Workout | Condensed edition of Jane Fonda's Pregnancy, Birth and Recovery Workout |
| 1993 | Jane Fonda's Yoga Exercise Workout | |
| 1994 | Jane Fonda's Step and Stretch Workout | |
| 1995 | Jane Fonda's Personal Trainer Series: Low Impact Aerobics & Stretch | |
| 1995 | Jane Fonda's Personal Trainer Series: Total Body Sculpting | |
| 1995 | Jane Fonda's Personal Trainer Series: Abs, Buns & Thighs | |
| 2010 | Jane Fonda's Prime Time: Fit and Strong | |
| 2010 | Jane Fonda's Prime Time: Walkout | |
| 2011 | Jane Fonda's Prime Time: Trim, Tone & Flex | |
| 2011 | Jane Fonda's Prime Time: Firm & Burn | |
| 2012 | Jane Fonda's Am/Pm Yoga for Beginners | |

== Stage ==
| Year | Title | Role | Venue | Ref. |
|---|---|---|---|---|
| 1955 | The Country Girl | | Omaha Community Playhouse | |
| 1960 | There Was a Little Girl | Toni Newton | Cort Theatre | |
| 1960–1961 | Invitation to a March | Norma Brown | Music Box Theatre | |
| 1962 | The Fun Couple | Tish Stanford | Lyceum Theatre | |
| 1963 | Strange Interlude | Madeline Arnold | Hudson Theatre/Martin Beck Theatre | |
| 2009 | 33 Variations | Dr. Katherine Brandt | Eugene O'Neill Theatre | |
