= Vaillant Group =

German heating and cooling company

Vaillant Group (company)
- Type: Private
- Industry: Heating, ventilation and air-conditioning technology (HVAC) and renewable energies
- Founded: 1874; 152 years ago
- Founder: Johann Vaillant
- Headquarters: Remscheid, Germany
- Key people: Norbert Schiedeck (CEO); Andreas Meier (Managing Director Sales, Marketing & Service); Stefan Borchers (Managing Director Finance and Services); Klaus König (Managing Director Industrial)
- Brands: Vaillant; Saunier Duval; awb; Bulex; DemirDöküm; Glow-worm; Hermann Saunier Duval; Protherm
- Revenue: €3.2 billion (2024)
- Number of employees: ~16,000 employees worldwide
- Website: www.vaillant-group.com

The Vaillant Group is a company that develops products for heating, cooling and hot water.

The company employs ~16,000 people worldwide and generates an annual turnover of approximately 3.2 billion euros. This makes the Vaillant Group one of the largest companies in its sector in Europe. The family-owned company is a global market leader in the wall-hung boiler segment. The Group's activities focus on the development of green products, and energy-saving and environmentally friendly products in particular, with the aim of achieving sustainable and profitable growth. The Vaillant Group's headquarters are located in Remscheid, North Rhine-Westphalia. The company is still one-hundred per cent family owned today.

== History ==
The history of the Vaillant Group dates back to 1874, when Johann Vaillant set up a master fitter's business. In 1894 Johann Vaillant patented a new "closed-system" gas-fired bathroom boiler.

This was the first device that made it possible to heat water hygienically, without contaminating it with combustion gases. This was a great technical innovation at the time and Johann Vaillant had a lasting impact on the development of heating technology. At the same time, he opened up a new market segment. In 1924 a further technical milestone was reached, with the development of the first central heating boiler. This device made it possible to heat a whole building with a central heating unit and several radiators in various rooms – a system that is still in use to this day.

Notable landmarks in the company's history include the launch of the first wall-hung circulation water heater, the Circo Geyser, in 1961, and the first wall-hung water heater with condensing boiler technology that was developed and produced in-house in 1995. 2001 saw the internationalisation and expansion of the Vaillant Group's brand and product portfolio and its sales and production network, following the acquisition of the British Hepworth Group. The company continued down this path of internationalisation with the acquisition of a majority stake in the Turkish heating and air-conditioning technology specialist Türk Demir Döküm Fabrikalari in 2007.

For several years the Vaillant Group has increasingly focused on technologies based on renewable energies. In 2006 the company began to produce heat pumps and in 2008 solar thermal collectors independently and on an industrial scale. Today, products based on gas condensing technology and heat pumps as well as systems which combine several building technologies constitute the company's main business.

== Brands ==
The Vaillant Group has eight international brands. The company's brands are managed separately in the European and non-European markets and can be found in more than 60 countries.

The Vaillant Group brand family includes the following:

- Vaillant (founded in 1874, Germany)
- Saunier Duval (1907, France)
- awb (1934, Netherlands)
- Bulex (1934, Belgium)
- DemirDöküm (1954, Turkey)
- Glow-worm (1934, United Kingdom)
- Hermann Saunier Duval(1970, Italy)
- Protherm (1991, Czechoslovakia)

The Glow-worm brand in the United Kingdom and the Saunier Duval brands in France were part of Vaillant's acquisition of British competitor Hepworth Limited in 2000. In the UK, the group markets both the Vaillant and Glow-worm brands.

== Sites ==
The Group has thirteen sites for R&D and manufacturing in five European countries, Turkey and China. There are three sites in Germany (Remscheid, Bergheim, Roding). In Slovakia there are three manufacturing plants in Trenčín, Skalica and Senica. Further sites include Nantes (France), Belper (UK), Vitoria (ES), Bozüyük (Turkey) and Wuxi (China).

== Products ==
The Vaillant Group's products cover heating, ventilation and air-conditioning. The company has thus positioned itself as a full-range supplier. Vaillant's core range includes wall-hung and floor-standing condensing boilers, solar thermal systems for hot water and heating, heat pump technologies, ventilation systems for low-energy houses, control technology, gas and electric water heaters, air-conditioning systems, radiators and related services.

== Prizes and awards ==
The Vaillant Group has won several awards over the years, including the following:

- 40 iF Industrie Forum Design Awards
- Red Dot Design Award (2011, 2010, 2009, 2007, 2006, 2005, 2002, 2017, 2018)
- German Sustainability Award for the most sustainable product (2011)
- B.A.U.M. Environmental Award (2014)
- German Sustainability Award as Germany's most sustainable large company (2015)

== Publications ==
The Vaillant Group publishes an annual magazine with information about the company's development and an annual sustainability report. Alongside these corporate reports, the Group also publishes the employee magazine Life and the Internet blog "21grad".
