= Mary Williams (activist) =

American social activist and author (born 1967)

- Born: October 13, 1967 (age 58); Oakland, California, U.S.
- Other name: Lulu Williams
- Occupations: Author, activist; National Park Service Ranger
- Known for: The Lost Daughter: A Memoir
- Parent(s): Jane Fonda (adoptive mother); Tom Hayden (adoptive father)

Mary Luana Williams (born October 13, 1967) is an American social activist and author. She is known for writing The Lost Daughter: A Memoir about her life. The memoir details being adopted by Jane Fonda and Tom Hayden in her adolescence, as well as growing up as a daughter of the Black Panthers before Fonda adopted her. She works with Sudanese refugees through the organization she founded, the Lost Boys Foundation.

== Early life ==
Mary Luana "Lulu" Williams was born on October 13, 1967, in East Oakland, California as the fifth daughter to Randy and Mary Williams. Both of her parents were members of the Black Panther Party, an organization dedicated to stopping police brutality toward African Americans and helping African Americans who lacked employment, education, and healthcare. The family lived at the heart of the movement in East Oakland, California, during the height of the Vietnam War, race riots and civil rights movement, in an era Williams would later describe as "violent and frenzied". Mary's father Randy was a captain within the Panthers militaristic hierarchy and participated in the controversial Armed Citizens' Patrol, where Panthers would tail police and patrol neighborhoods, ready to defend any black people they saw being threatened by police.

In April 1970, Williams' father and other Panthers witnessed several police officers arresting four black people suspected of marijuana possession and they intervened, ambushing and wounding three of the officers before fleeing. 30 patrol cars pursued them on a high speed car chase while the Panthers tried to discourage pursuit by throwing molotov cocktails. Randy Williams was apprehended, charged with assault with intent to murder and given a seven-year sentence at a Correctional Training Facility near Soledad, California. At the time, Williams was four. Her mother was left to care for Williams and her five siblings, eventually becoming physically abusive while descending into alcoholism. Williams's family further deteriorated when one of her siblings ran away and another turned to street prostitution as well as crack cocaine. Williams and her siblings were signed up for Laurel Springs Children's Camp, a camp started by Fonda that was located on 160 acres near Santa Monica, California. She got to know Fonda while at the camp and returned over successive years, even when her siblings did not.

With aspirations to be an actor and escape Oakland, Williams went on an "open casting call" at age 14 at a theatre director's house. The man, named David, raped her. Over a number of weeks, David continued the assaults, even driving to pick her up and take Williams back to his house. When he no longer wanted to be part of the "relationship" when school began again, Williams felt relieved and abandoned: "It took a long time for me to understand how it was that I had switched so quickly from a self-assured girl into a passive victim." After returning to Laurel Springs Children's Camp the next summer, she eventually told counselors about the rape, who relayed that information to Fonda. Jane had a long heart-to-heart talk with Williams, and made her promise to tell her family about the rape, and said that if she worked on getting her grades up the next year, she could come to live with her for as long as she needed to. Williams stated, "I had given up on myself and my grades at school suffered, but Jane’s proposal renewed my interest in school. She threw me a lifeline and I grabbed it." In 1982, Mary moved in with Fonda at her Santa Monica home.

=== Adoption ===
There was no formal discussion of adoption within the Fonda household. Troy Garity, Fonda's biological son with activist Tom Hayden, stated, "She just sort of came down [to live with us] and it was fine and happy for me because it was somebody that I had a connection with. She was older, which is always cool when you have a teenager who's actually listening to you!"

No formal adoption papers were drawn up, and on Williams's mother's blessing, she lived with Fonda for the rest of her adolescence and into young adulthood. She was raised with Vanessa Vadim and brother Troy as one of the children, with everyone involved feeling that she was part of the family. It took time for Mary to transition to the affluence of Fonda's world.

== Career ==
Williams worked as a fundraiser for the International Rescue Committee in their Atlanta office. When she saw refugees coming in from Sudan, she developed a passion for working with them, eventually leaving her job with IRC in 2001 to work more closely with Sudanese refugees through her own organization.

She founded the Lost Boys Foundation, a group that works with the Lost Boys of Sudan to help them after they have been displaced by the Second Sudanese Civil War. At her urging, writer Dave Eggers began talking to Valentino Achak Deng, a Sudanese refugee and member of the Lost Boys Foundation program, about Deng writing a memoir. The work eventually became What Is the What: The Autobiography of Valentino Achak Deng, which was published in 2006. Williams wrote her own book about the lost boys of Sudan, the children's book Brothers in Hope: The Story of the Lost Boys of Sudan. It was published by Lee & Low Books in 2005.

Williams wrote The Lost Daughter: A Memoir about her life experiences, focusing on her life with two families. The book was published in 2013. Kirkus Reviews called the book "A tender memoir of love and redemption" as well as "A compassionate tale of soul-searching and family love."

She was a supporter of Barack Obama when he was running for reelection as President of the United States in 2012. Writing from Buenos Aires, Williams stated, "As a child of the Black Power Movement I can’t deny that I’m happy to see a Black man in the White House, but my politics are more than skin deep. The thought of entrusting our national environmental treasures to folks who only seek to exploit them keeps me up at night. I’m voting for Obama in November because we have too much to lose."
