= Jane Fonda in Five Acts =

- Official poster
- Directed by: Susan Lacy
- Produced by: Susan Lacy; Jessica Levin; Emma Pildes
- Starring: Jane Fonda
- Cinematography: Samuel Painter
- Edited by: Benjamin Gray
- Music by: Paul Cantelon
- Production companies: HBO Documentary Films; Pentimento Productions
- Distributed by: HBO
- Release dates: January 20, 2018 (Sundance); September 24, 2018 (United States)
- Running time: 133 minutes
- Country: United States
- Languages: English; French

Jane Fonda in Five Acts is a 2018 American documentary film, directed by Susan Lacy. It revolves around the life and career of Jane Fonda.

The film had its world premiere at the Sundance Film Festival on January 20, 2018. It was released on September 24, 2018, by HBO. The film was nominated for a Primetime Emmy Award for Outstanding Documentary or Nonfiction Special.

== Synopsis ==
The film follows the life, career, and activism of Jane Fonda. Robert Redford, Lily Tomlin, Troy Garity, Paula Weinstein, Ted Turner, Sam Waterston, Malcolm and Vivian Valdim appear in the film.

== Release ==
The film had its world premiere at the Sundance Film Festival on January 20, 2018. The film also screened at the Cannes Film Festival on May 10, 2018. It was released on September 24, 2018, by HBO.

== Reception ==
Jane Fonda in Five Acts received positive reviews from film critics. It holds a 97% approval rating on review aggregator website Rotten Tomatoes, based on 29 reviews, with an average of 8.3/10. The site's critical consensus reads, "Raw and rich in decade-spanning detail, Jane Fonda in Five Acts paints a living portrait of one [of] popular culture's most compelling figures." On Metacritic, the film holds a rating of 87 out of 100, based on 8 critics, indicating "universal acclaim".
