= Tall Story =

1960 film by Joshua Logan

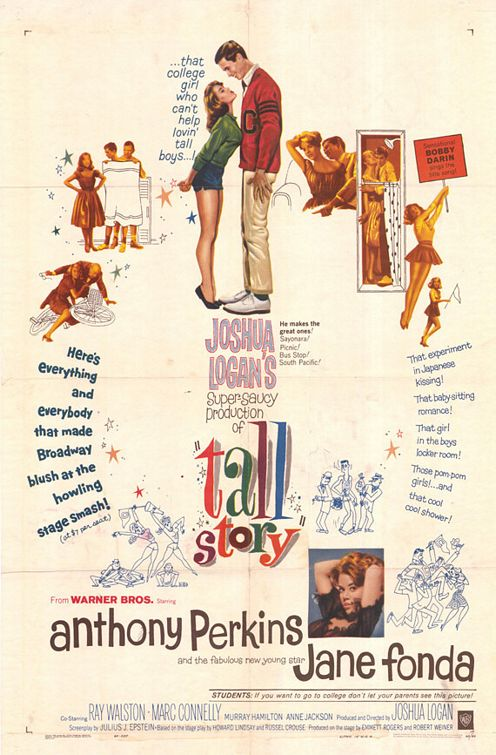
- 1960 film promotion
- Directed by: Joshua Logan
- Screenplay by: Julius J. Epstein
- Based on: Tall Story; 1959 play by Russel Crouse; Howard Lindsay; The Homecoming Game; 1957 novel by Howard Nemerov
- Produced by: Joshua Logan
- Starring: Anthony Perkins; Jane Fonda
- Cinematography: Ellsworth Fredericks
- Edited by: Philip W. Anderson
- Music by: Cyril J. Mockridge
- Production company: Warner Bros. Pictures
- Distributed by: Warner Bros. Pictures
- Release date: April 6, 1960 (U.S.)
- Running time: 91 minutes
- Country: United States
- Language: English
- Box office: $1,700,000 (US/ Canada)

Tall Story is a 1960 American romantic comedy film made by Warner Bros. Pictures, directed by Joshua Logan, and starring Anthony Perkins and Jane Fonda in her film debut. It is based on the 1957 novel The Homecoming Game by Howard Nemerov, which was the basis of a successful 1959 Broadway play titled Tall Story, by the writing team of Howard Lindsay and Russel Crouse. The film was a considerable departure from Logan's previous two projects, the drama Sayonara, which won multiple Academy Awards, and the blockbuster South Pacific. It was Robert Redford's first film — he played a basketball player in an uncredited role (Redford had previously appeared as a replacement in the Broadway play in 1959).

The film is a farcical social satire of American campus life, making fun of the way college life can become a marriage market for some students. Fonda portrays a character who is the complete opposite of the independent liberated woman she later personified.

== Plot ==
At Custer University, Ray Blent is an honor student and college basketball star. June Ryder has come to the university to study home economics and to find a husband. Both students and faculty are scandalized by Ryder's unashamed pursuit of Blent. She joins the pom-pom girls and attends all the classes taken by Blent to ensure she has maximum contact with him. Everyone is aware of her designs on the sexually naive Blent except for him. She succeeds in convincing him that she has an intelligent, inquiring mind that he admires, although this is all done through deception. She eventually gets Blent to fall for her and, on the night of their first date, he proposes marriage. However, they need several thousand dollars to set up a home.

Blent is secretly propositioned, via a radio message, by a gambling syndicate to lose a key game with a visiting Russian team. He refuses to do this, but is unable to return the US$4,000 (equivalent to $43,500 in 2025) cash as he does not know who is behind the bribe. Rather than deliberately throw the game, he decides to deliberately fail an ethics exam, which automatically disqualifies him from playing. He is the best student in class, and the only way he can fail is by copying Ryder's paper. He realizes too late that his not playing is tantamount to ensuring his team will lose and that he has given the gamblers exactly what they want.

Meanwhile, his ethics professor, Leo Sullivan, is coming under extreme student and faculty pressure to reverse the failure and give Blent a passing grade. He refuses to do this on principle, but finally consents to give Blent an oral retest while the game is in progress. Blent passes and plays for the last few minutes, achieving a one-point victory for the school.

== Cast ==
Shower scene, on the 1960 film poster

- Anthony Perkins as Ray Blent
- Jane Fonda as June Ryder
- Ray Walston as Professor Leo Sullivan
- Marc Connelly as Professor Charles Osman
- Anne Jackson as Myra Sullivan
- Murray Hamilton as Coach Sandy Hardy
- Bob Wright as President Harmon Nagel
- Bart Burns as District Attorney Davis
- Karl Lukas as 1st Detective
- Elizabeth Patterson as Connie
- Tom Laughlin as Fred Jensen
- Barbara Darrow as Frieda Jensen
- Robert Redford as a Basketball player (uncredited)

== Production ==
The film's working title was "The Way the Ball Bounces". Producer/director Joshua Logan originally intended the film to be a vehicle for both Jane Fonda and Warren Beatty to make their screen debuts, but Warner Bros. would not approve the unknown Beatty for the part, and Logan had to settle for his second choice, Anthony Perkins.

Fonda had hated the Broadway play, but was pleased that her part in the film script had been expanded. Logan was a good friend of her father Henry Fonda and saw Jane as a potential major star. He wanted to guide her through her first film experience – she had been modelling for several years – but Fonda found it a "Kafkaesque nightmare," explaining in her autobiography My Life So Far that during the making of Tall Story she suffered from bulimia, sleepwalking, and irrational fears that she was "boring, untalented, and plain." In 2019, Fonda stated both she and Logan were in love with lead actor Anthony Perkins at the time of filming, causing tension during an already difficult shoot.

A wire-service story shared Fonda's perspective about her good fortune: “Jane frankly admits how she got the role. The producer-director is Josh Logan, her godfather. ‘Of course I’m very grateful to Mr. Logan’ she said as she was getting her hair styled at Warner's. ‘Because of my name, I’m getting the kind of role it would ordinarily take years to earn’.”

Campus scenes were filmed at Occidental College in Eagle Rock, Los Angeles.

== Reception ==
On its release in 1960, the film was neither a commercial nor a critical success. A Time magazine reviewer wrote: "Nothing could possibly save the picture, not even the painfully personable Perkins doing his famous awkward act, not even a second-generation Fonda with a smile like her father's and legs like a chorus girl."

The Washington Star was displeased: “The title of the picture...is ‘Tall Story,’ but there are a great many more apt adjectives, one of which is ‘dull’ and another ‘trivial’...the funny thing about it is that so many talented humans can manage to look inept at one time and all one place. Among those are director Logan, players Anthony Perkins, Henry Fonda's daughter Jane, and Ray Walston, and the original authors Howard Lindsay and Russel Crouse.”

== See also ==
- List of American films of 1960
- List of basketball films
- List of films about mathematicians
