= The National German Sustainability Award =

Environmental award

National German Sustainability Award
- Native name: Deutscher Nachhaltigkeitspreis (DNP)
- Description: Recognizing social and ecological responsibility and sustainable role models
- Country: Germany
- Presented by: Stiftung Deutscher Nachhaltigkeitspreis e.V.
- First award: 2008
- Website: https://www.nachhaltigkeitspreis.de/

The National German Sustainability Award was established in 2008 to encourage the acceptance of social and ecological responsibility and to identify role models in the area of sustainability. The award is endorsed by the German Federal Government, local and business associations as well as numerous NGOs, among them UNESCO and UNICEF. The awards are presented to cities, companies and individuals promoting the idea of a sustainable society by Federal Chancellor Angela Merkel or other members of her cabinet. Responsible for the award is the foundation Deutscher Nachhaltigkeitspreis e.V.

== Awards ==
The German Sustainability Award includes the categories companies, products, municipalities (since 2012), research (since 2012), building (since 2013) and next economy (since 2016). Each category includes more than one award, for example includes die categories companies award for SMEs, medium-big and big companies.

== See also ==
- List of environmental awards
