= List of awards and nominations received by Diane Keaton =

Diane Keaton awards and nominations
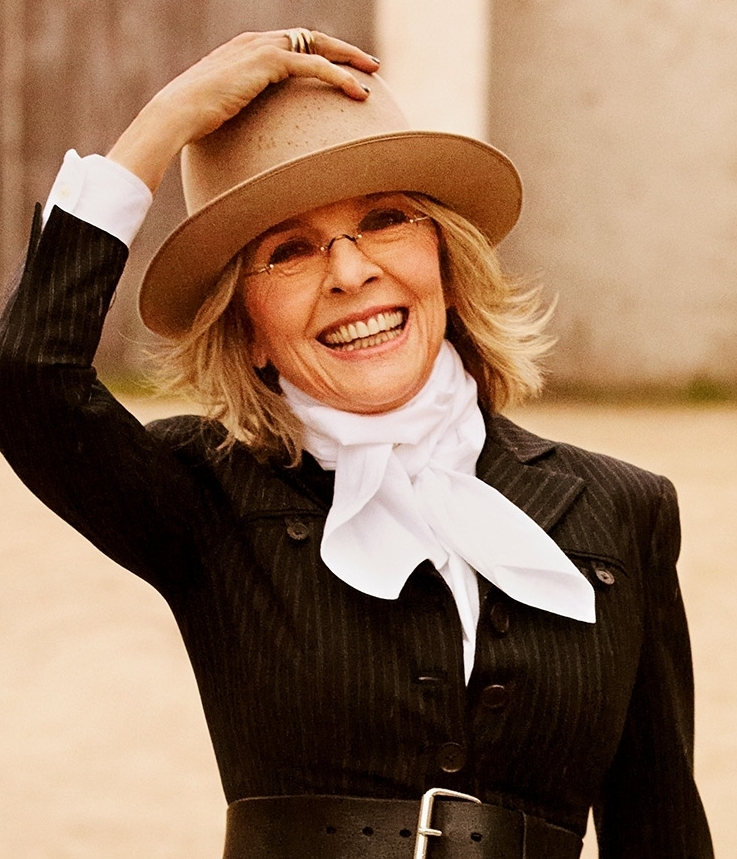
- Keaton in 2012
Awards and nominations
Award	Wins	Nominations
Academy Awards	1	4
British Academy Film Awards	1	3
Daytime Emmy Awards	0	1
Golden Globe Awards	2	9
Primetime Emmy Awards	0	1
Screen Actors Guild Awards	0	4
Tony Awards	0	1

Totals (Note: Certain award groups do not simply award one winner. They acknowledge several different recipients, have runners-up, and have third place. Since this is a specific recognition and is different from losing an award, runner-up mentions are considered wins in this award tally. For simplification and to avoid errors, each award in this list has been presumed to have had a prior nomination.)
- Wins: 37
- Nominations: 82

This article is a list of awards and nominations received by Diane Keaton.

Diane Keaton was an American actress. She was known for her leading roles in comedic and dramatic work on stage and screen. Over her six decade long career, she has received various awards including an Academy Award, a British Academy Film Award and two Golden Globe Awards as well as nominations for two Emmy Awards, four Screen Actors Guild Awards, and a Tony Award.

Keaton won the Academy Award for Best Actress for playing the title role in the Woody Allen romantic comedy Annie Hall (1977). She was further Oscar-nominated for playing Louise Bryant in the historical epic Reds (1981), a woman struggling with leukemia in the family drama in Marvin's Room (1996), and an older woman looking for love in the romantic comedy Something's Gotta Give (2003). For her role in Annie Hall she also won the BAFTA Award for Best Actress in a Leading Role and the Golden Globe Award for Best Actress in a Motion Picture – Musical or Comedy.

She won her second Golden Globe Award for Best Actress in a Motion Picture – Musical or Comedy for Something's Gotta Give (2003). She was Globe-nominated for her roles in the crime drama Looking for Mr. Goodbar (1977), the historical epic Reds (1981), the family drama Shoot the Moon (1982), the drama Mrs. Soffel (1984), the comedy Baby Boom (1987), and the mystery comedy Manhattan Murder Mystery (1993).

On television, she portrayed Amelia Earhart in the TNT television film Amelia Earhart: The Final Flight (1994) for which she was nominated for the Primetime Emmy Award for Outstanding Lead Actress in a Miniseries or a Special, the Golden Globe Award for Best Actress – Miniseries or Television Film, and the Screen Actors Guild Award for Outstanding Performance by a Female Actor in a Miniseries or Television Movie.

For her work on the Broadway stage, she received a nomination for the Tony Award for Best Featured Actress in a Play for her romantic role in Woody Allen's comedic play Play It Again, Sam (1969).

== Major associations ==
=== Academy Awards ===
Year	Category	Nominated work	Result	Ref.
1978	Best Actress	Annie Hall	Won	
1982	Best Actress	Reds	Nominated	
1997	Best Actress	Marvin's Room	Nominated	
2004	Best Actress	Something's Gotta Give	Nominated	

=== BAFTA Awards ===
Year	Category	Nominated work	Result	Ref.
British Academy Film Awards
1978	Best Actress in a Leading Role	Annie Hall	Won	
1980	Best Actress in a Leading Role	Manhattan	Nominated	
1983	Best Actress in a Leading Role	Reds	Nominated	

=== Emmy Awards ===
Year	Category	Nominated work	Result	Ref.
Primetime Emmy Awards
1995	Outstanding Lead Actress in a Miniseries or a Special	Amelia Earhart: The Final Flight	Nominated	
Daytime Emmy Awards
1990	Outstanding Achievement in Directing – Special Class	CBS Schoolbreak Special (Episode: "The Girl with the Crazy Brother")	Nominated	

=== Golden Globe Awards ===
Year	Category	Nominated work	Result	Ref.
1978	Best Actress in a Motion Picture – Musical or Comedy	Annie Hall	Won	
1978	Best Actress in a Motion Picture – Drama	Looking for Mr. Goodbar	Nominated	
1982	Best Actress in a Motion Picture – Drama	Reds	Nominated	
1983	Best Actress in a Motion Picture – Drama	Shoot the Moon	Nominated	
1985	Best Actress in a Motion Picture – Drama	Mrs. Soffel	Nominated	
1988	Best Actress in a Motion Picture – Musical or Comedy	Baby Boom	Nominated	
1994	Best Actress in a Motion Picture – Musical or Comedy	Manhattan Murder Mystery	Nominated	
1995	Best Actress – Miniseries or Television Film	Amelia Earhart: The Final Flight	Nominated	
2004	Best Actress in a Motion Picture – Musical or Comedy	Something's Gotta Give	Won	

=== Screen Actors Guild Awards ===
Year	Category	Nominated work	Result	Ref.
1995	Outstanding Female Actor in a Miniseries or Television Movie	Amelia Earhart: The Final Flight	Nominated	
1997	Outstanding Performance by a Cast in a Motion Picture	Marvin's Room	Nominated	
1997	Outstanding Female Actor in a Leading Role	Marvin's Room	Nominated	
2004	Outstanding Female Actor in a Leading Role	Something's Gotta Give	Nominated	

=== Tony Awards ===
Year	Category	Nominated work	Result	Ref.
1969	Best Featured Actress in a Play	Play It Again, Sam	Nominated	

== Critics awards ==
Award	Year	Category	Nominated work	Result	Ref.
Alliance of Women Film Journalists	2008	Actress Most in Need of a New Agent	Because I Said So	Nominated	
Critics' Choice Movie Awards	1996	Best Actress	Marvin's Room	Nominated	
Critics' Choice Movie Awards	2003	Best Actress	Something's Gotta Give	Nominated	
Dallas-Fort Worth Film Critics Association	2003	Best Actress	Something's Gotta Give	Nominated	
Iowa Film Critics Awards	2004	Best Actress	Something's Gotta Give	Won	
Kansas City Film Critics Circle Awards	1977	Best Actress	Annie Hall	Won	
Los Angeles Film Critics Association Awards	1981	Best Actress	Reds	Runner-up	
National Board of Review Awards	1977	Best Supporting Actress	Annie Hall	Won	
National Board of Review Awards	1996	Best Acting by an Ensemble	The First Wives Club	Won	
National Board of Review Awards	2003	Best Actress	Something's Gotta Give	Won	
National Society of Film Critics Awards	1977	Best Actress	Annie Hall	Won	
National Society of Film Critics Awards	1979	Best Actress	Manhattan	4th Place	
National Society of Film Critics Awards	1981	Best Actress	Reds	3rd Place	
National Society of Film Critics Awards	1982	Best Actress	Shoot the Moon	3rd Place	
National Society of Film Critics Awards	1987	Best Actress	Baby Boom	2nd Place	
New York Film Critics Circle Awards	1977	Best Actress	Annie Hall	Won	
New York Film Critics Circle Awards	1977	Best Actress	Looking for Mr. Goodbar	3rd Place	
New York Film Critics Circle Awards	1981	Best Actress	Reds	3rd Place	
New York Film Critics Circle Awards	1982	Best Actress	Shoot the Moon	2nd Place	
New York Film Critics Circle Awards	2005	Best Supporting Actress	The Family Stone	3rd Place	
Phoenix Film Critics Society Awards	2003	Best Actress in a Leading Role	Something's Gotta Give	Nominated	
Southeastern Film Critics Association Awards	2003	Best Actress	Something's Gotta Give	Runner-up	
Washington D.C. Area Film Critics Association Awards	2003	Best Actress	Something's Gotta Give	Nominated	

== Miscellaneous awards ==
Award	Year	Category	Nominated work	Result	Ref.
AARP Movies for Grownups Awards	2003	Best Actress	Something's Gotta Give	Won	
AARP Movies for Grownups Awards	2003	Best Grownup Love Story (shared with Jack Nicholson)	Something's Gotta Give	Won	
AARP Movies for Grownups Awards	2005	Best Grownup Love Story (shared with Craig T. Nelson)	The Family Stone	Won	
AARP Movies for Grownups Awards	2010	Best Supporting Actress	Morning Glory	Nominated	
AARP Movies for Grownups Awards	2015	Best Grownup Love Story (shared with Morgan Freeman)	Five Flights Up	Won	
American Comedy Awards	1987	Funniest Actress in a Motion Picture (Leading Role)	Baby Boom	Nominated	
American Comedy Awards	1996	Funniest Actress in a Motion Picture (Leading Role)	The First Wives Club	Nominated	
Awards Circuit Community Awards	1996	Best Actress in a Leading Role	Marvin's Room	Nominated	
Behind the Voice Actors Awards	2016	Best Vocal Ensemble in a Feature Film	Finding Dory	Nominated	
CableACE Awards	1994	Actress in a Movie or Miniseries	Running Mates	Nominated	
CableACE Awards	1995	Actress in a Movie or Miniseries	Amelia Earhart: The Final Flight	Nominated	
David di Donatello Awards	1982	Best Foreign Actress	Reds	Won	
Fontogramas de Plata	1979	Best Foreign Movie Performer	Interiors / Looking for Mr. Goodbar	Won	
Golden Raspberry Awards	2007	Worst Actress	Because I Said So	Nominated	
Golden Raspberry Awards	2022	Worst Actress	Mack & Rita	Nominated	
Italian Online Movie Awards	2004	Best Actress	Something's Gotta Give	Nominated	
Monte-Carlo TV Festival	2017	Outstanding Actress in a Drama Television Series	The Young Pope	Nominated	
Online Film & Television Association Awards	1996	Best Adapted Song	"You Don't Own Me" (from The First Wives Club)	Nominated	
Online Film & Television Association Awards	2017	Best Supporting Actress in a Motion Picture or Limited Series	The Young Pope	Nominated	
People's Choice Awards	1977	Favorite Motion Picture Actress	Annie Hall	Nominated	
People's Choice Awards	1978	Favorite Motion Picture Actress	Interiors	Nominated	
People's Choice Awards	1981	Favorite Motion Picture Actress	Reds	Nominated	
People's Choice Awards	1982	Favorite Motion Picture Actress	Shoot the Moon	Nominated	
Prism Awards	2004	Television Movie or Miniseries	On Thin Ice	Won	
Prism Awards	2004	Performance in a Television Movie or Miniseries	On Thin Ice	Nominated	
Satellite Awards	2003	Best Actress in a Motion Picture – Musical or Comedy	Something's Gotta Give	Won	
Satellite Awards	2005	Best Supporting Actress in a Motion Picture – Musical or Comedy	The Family Stone	Nominated	
Stinkers Bad Movie Awards	2000	Worst On-Screen Group (shared with Lisa Kudrow and Meg Ryan)	Hanging Up	Nominated	

== Honorary awards ==
Award	Year	Notes	Ref.
American Film Institute	2017	AFI Life Achievement Award	
Elle Women in Hollywood	1998	Icon Award	
Film at Lincoln Center	2007	Chaplin Gala Tribute	
Harvard University	1991	Hasty Pudding Woman of the Year	
Santa Barbara International Film Festival	2001	Maltin Modern Master Award	
US Comedy Arts Festival	2004	AFI Star Award	
Women in Film Crystal + Lucy Awards	1997	Crystal Award	
Zurich Film Festival	2014	Golden Career Icon	
