= Saved (Diane Keaton book) =

Photography book

Saved: My Picture World
- First edition cover
- Author: Diane Keaton
- Language: English
- Publisher: Rizzoli
- Publication date: 2022
- ISBN: 978-0-8478-7128-5 (first edition, hardcover)
- LC Class: TR655 .K43

Saved: My Picture World is a 2022 photography book by Diane Keaton. It was published by Rizzoli and was her final publication. It has been described as a "visual autobiography".

== Description ==
Specific sections in Saved focused on "Clinical Diagnoses of Diseases of the Mouth", pigeons, and the "lower-key denizens" of Hollywood Boulevard. Keaton felt that the street performers and studio greeters were like herself " ... just one more lost soul searching for some kind of redemption". The cover features a photograph by Giuseppe Pino of an empty picture frame being held by three hands in a visual gag. The book has 13 chapters with a short essay by Keaton preceding each one. The book is dedicated to Keaton's brother who suffered from dementia. The book consists of photographs taken by Keaton with her Rolleiflex camera as well as photo collages and scrapbook pages and images by Randy, Keaton's brother.

Robert Lang, writing for Deadline described Saved as a "cabinet of saved and found photographic curiosities, a scrapbook of her fascinations, and a direct reflection of her idiosyncratic charm". Writing for Print magazine, Steven Heller described it as having "just the right balance of mystery, vernacular, personal history and artistry".
