= 61st Golden Globe Awards =

Film award ceremony in 2004

- Date: January 25, 2004
- Site: Beverly Hilton Hotel; Beverly Hills, Los Angeles, California

Highlights
- Best Film: Drama: The Lord of the Rings: The Return of the King
- Best Film: Musical or Comedy: Lost in Translation
- Best Drama Series: 24
- Best Musical or Comedy Series: The Office (UK)
- Best Miniseries or Television movie: Angels in America

Television coverage
- Network: NBC

The 61st Golden Globe Awards, honoring the best in film and television for 2003, were held on January 25, 2004, at the Beverly Hilton Hotel in Beverly Hills, California. The nominations were announced on December 18, 2003.

The Lord of the Rings: The Return of the King won the most awards, with 4 (including Best Motion Picture – Drama). Cold Mountain received the most nominations, with 8 (winning 1, Best Supporting Actress). Big Fish had the most nominations (4) without a single win.

The ceremony was watched by a record-setting audience of 26.8 million people.

== Winners and nominees ==
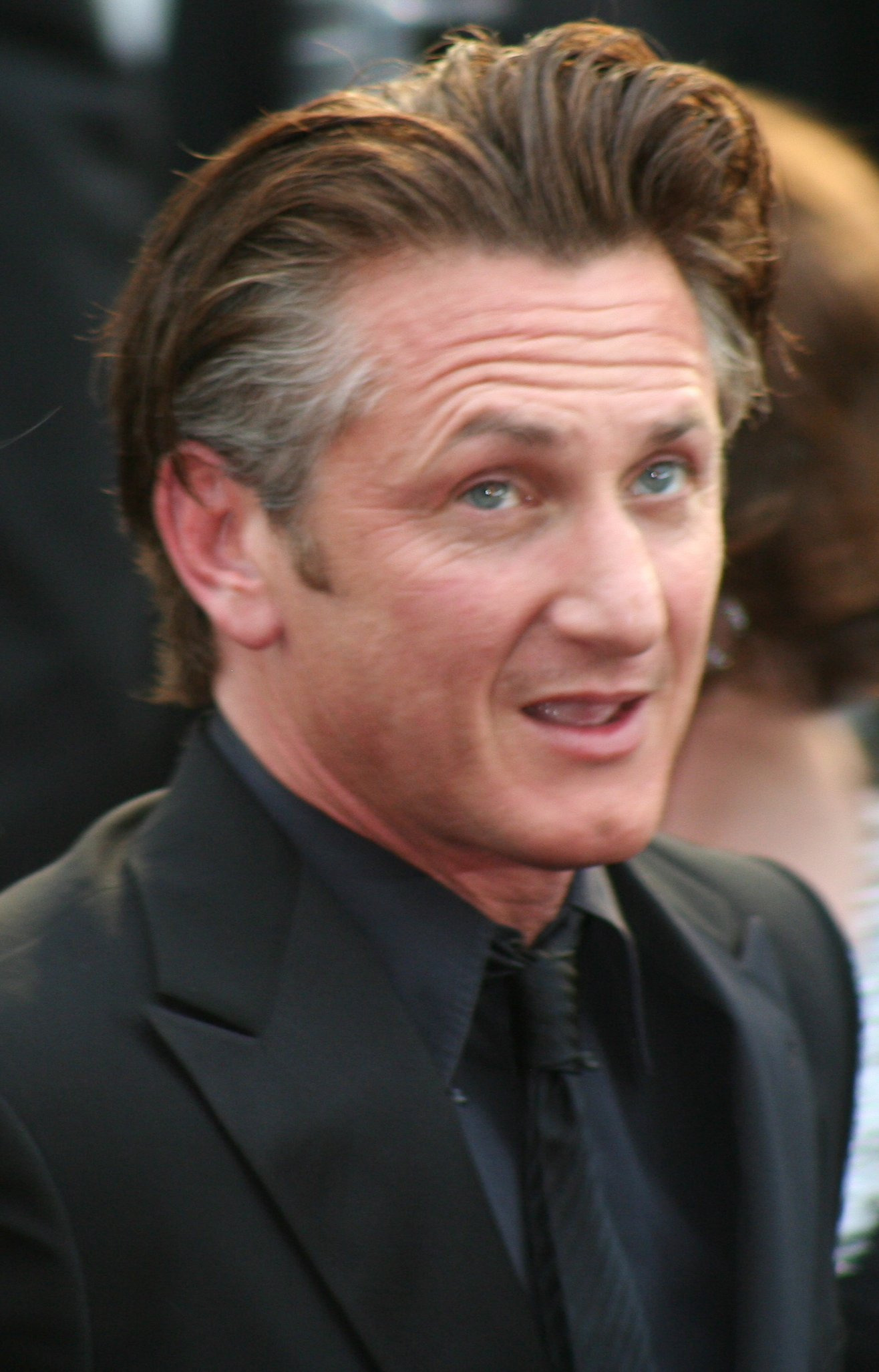
Sean Penn, Best Actor in a Motion Picture – Drama winner

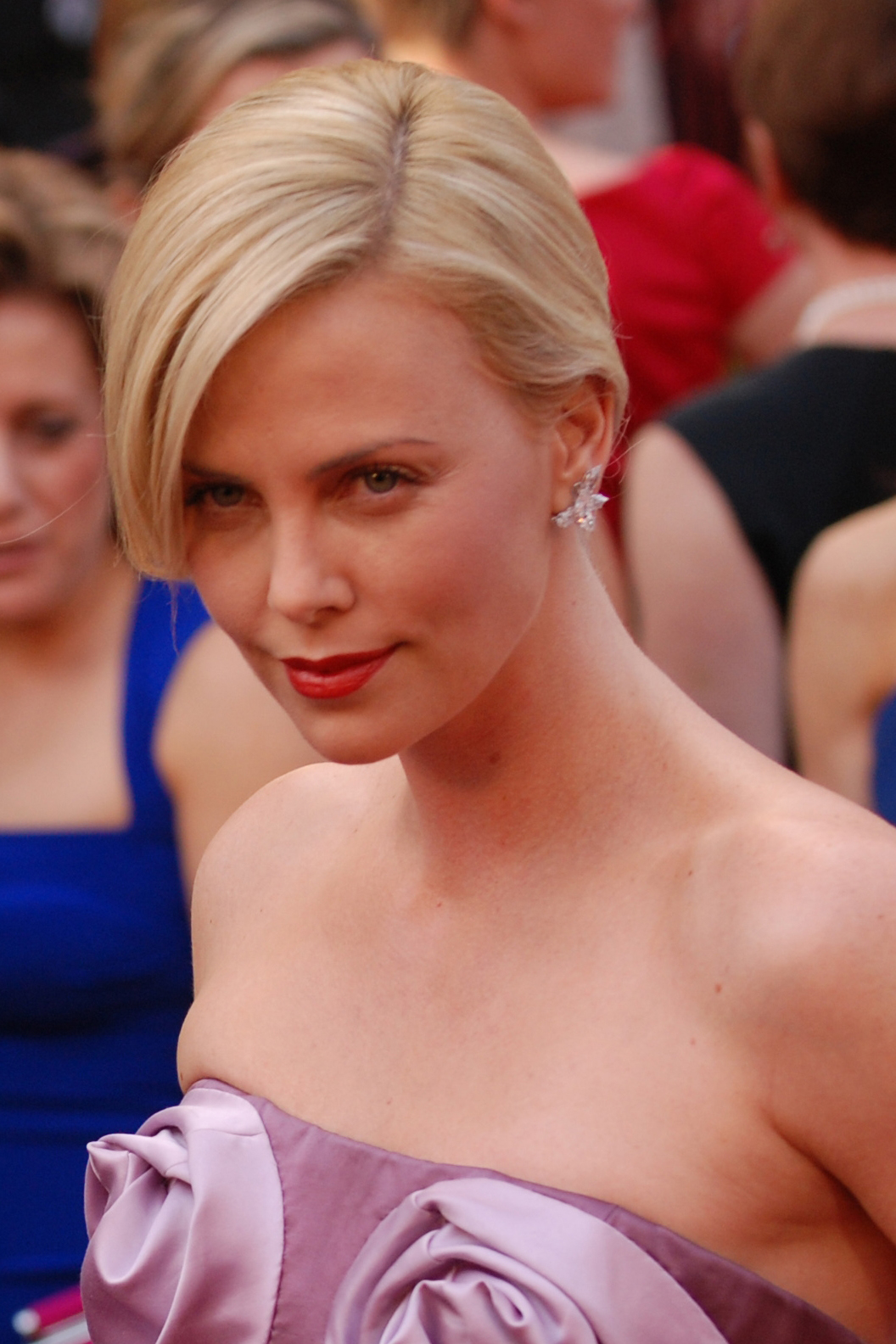
Charlize Theron, Best Actress in a Motion Picture – Drama winner

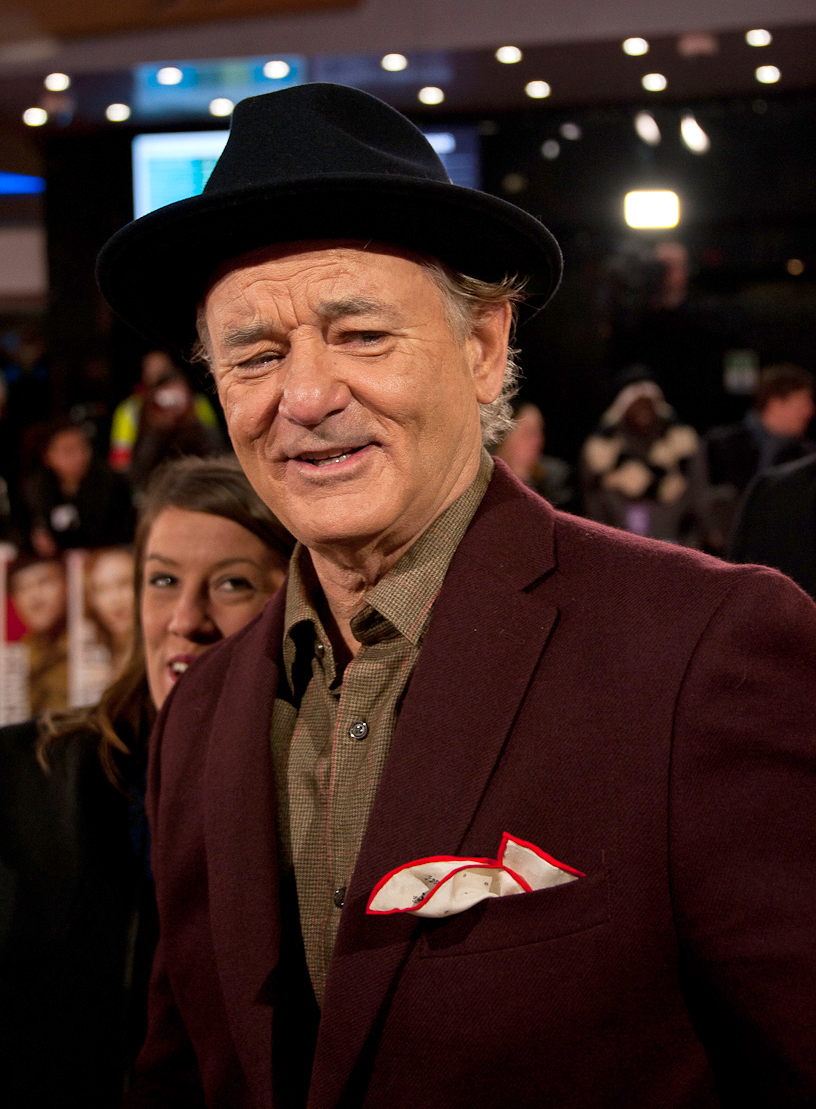
Bill Murray, Best Actor in a Motion Picture – Musical or Comedy winner

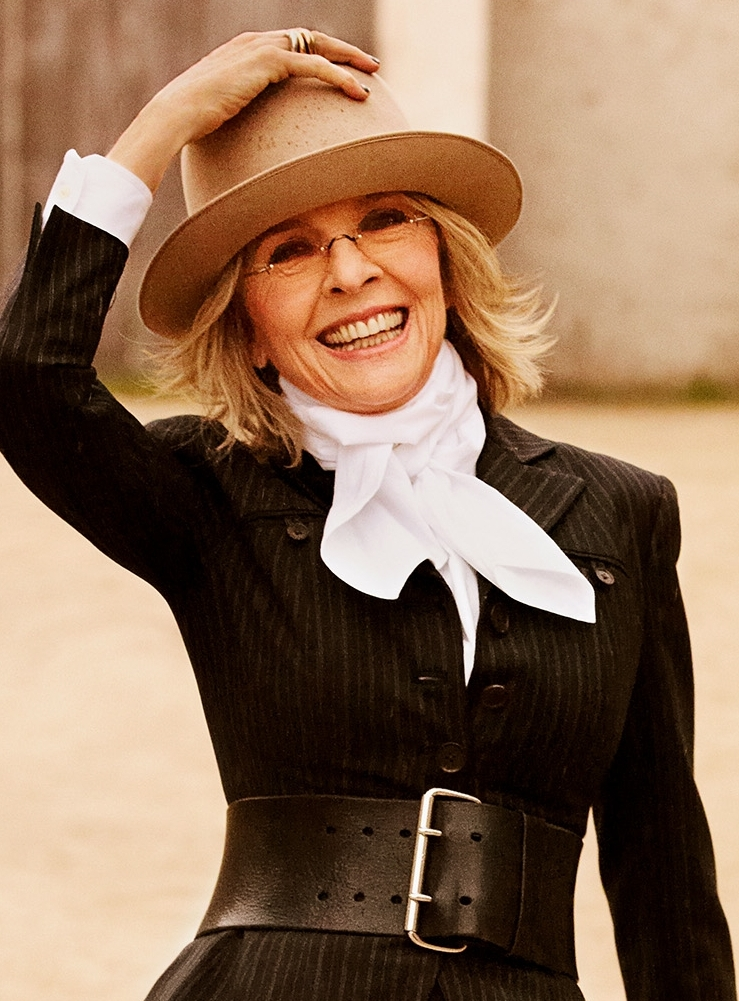
Diane Keaton, Best Actress in a Motion Picture – Musical or Comedy winner

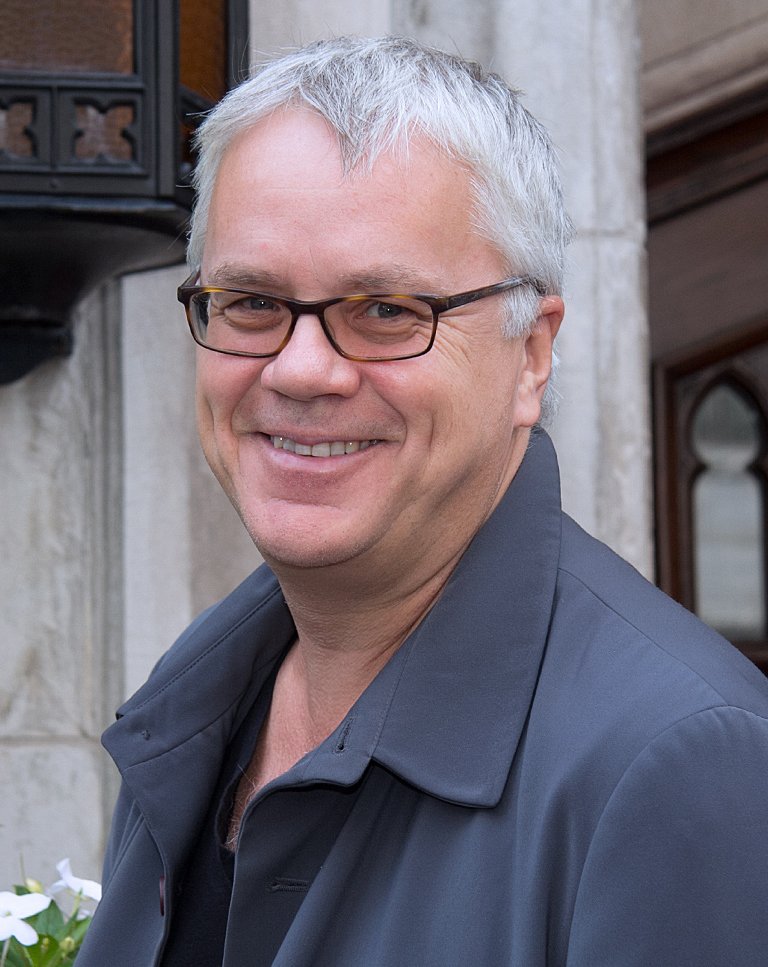
Tim Robbins, Best Supporting Actor winner

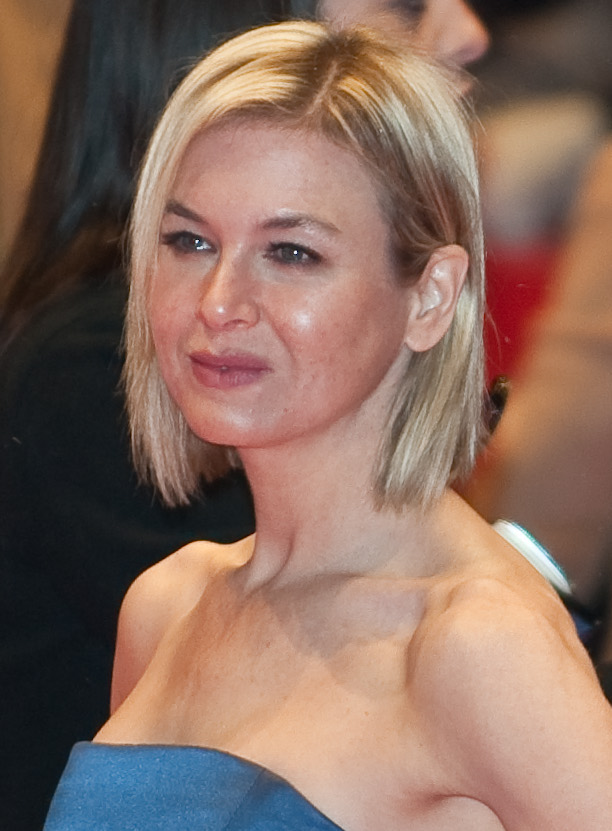
Renée Zellweger, Best Supporting Actress winner

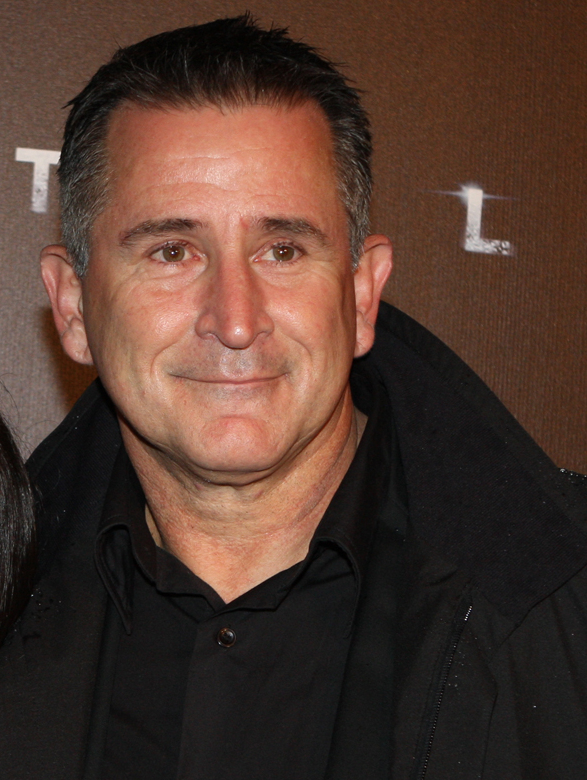
Anthony LaPaglia, Best Actor in a Television Series – Drama winner

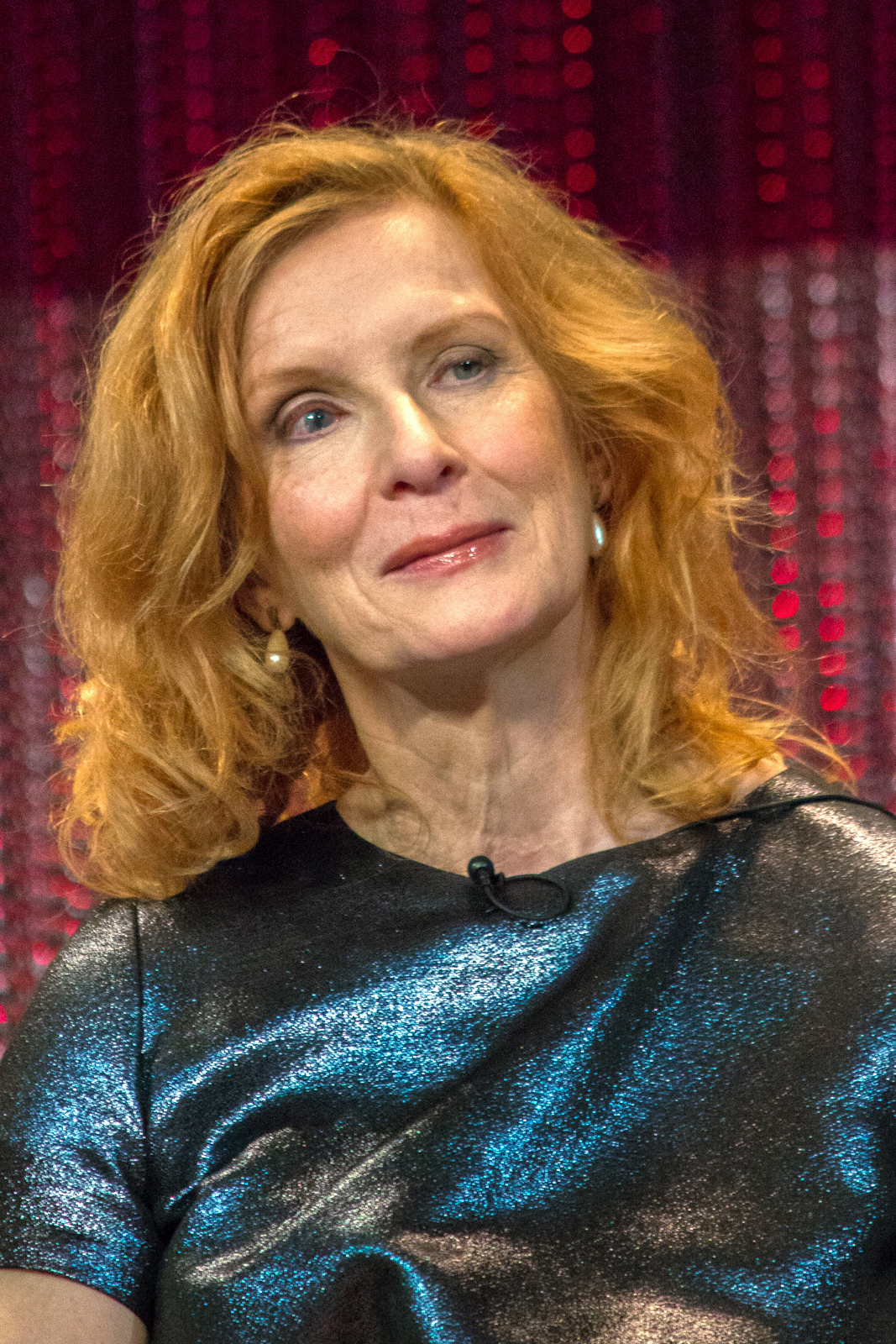
Frances Conroy, Best Actress in a Television Series – Drama winner

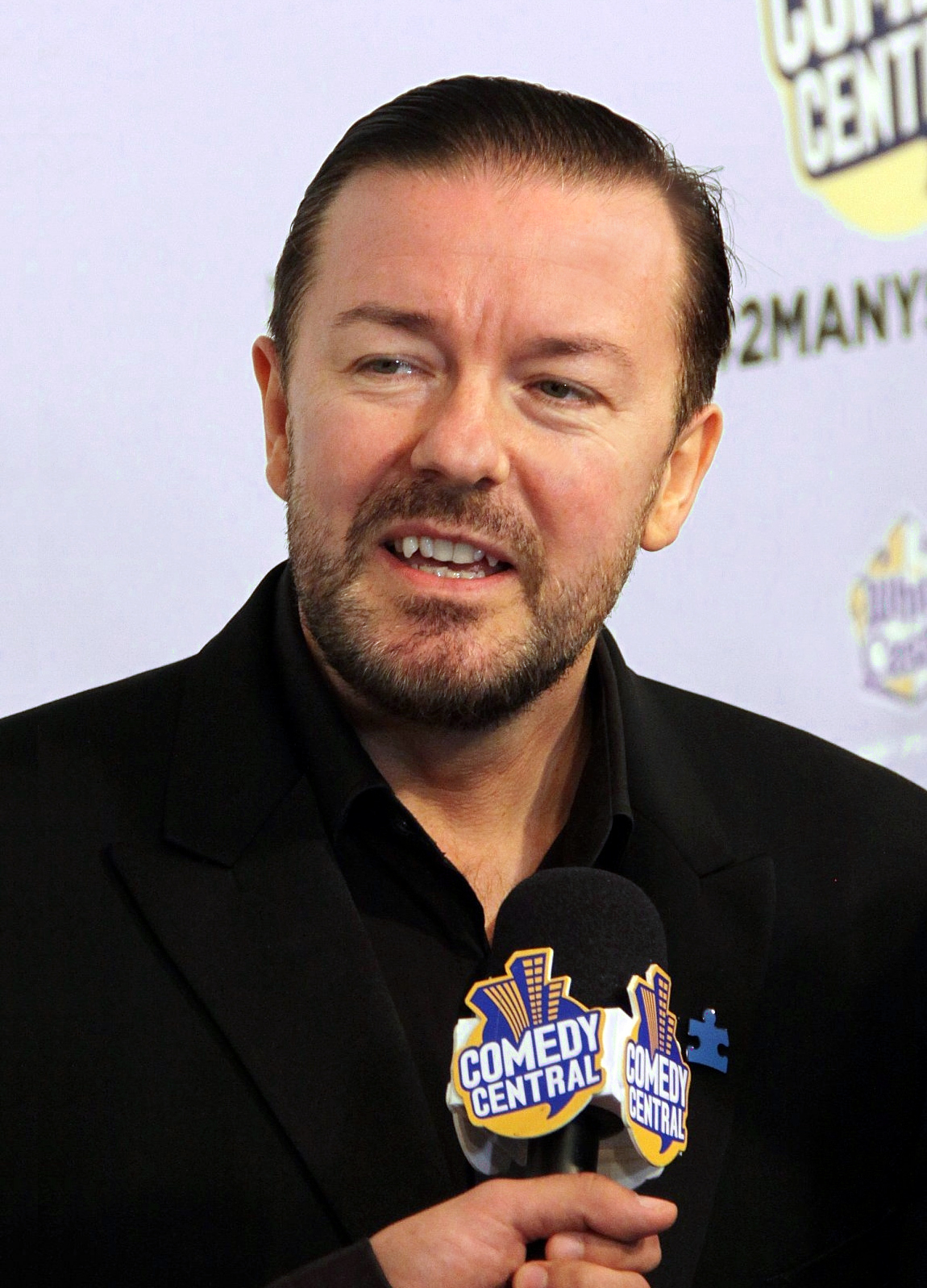
Ricky Gervais, Best Actor in a Television Series – Musical or Comedy winner

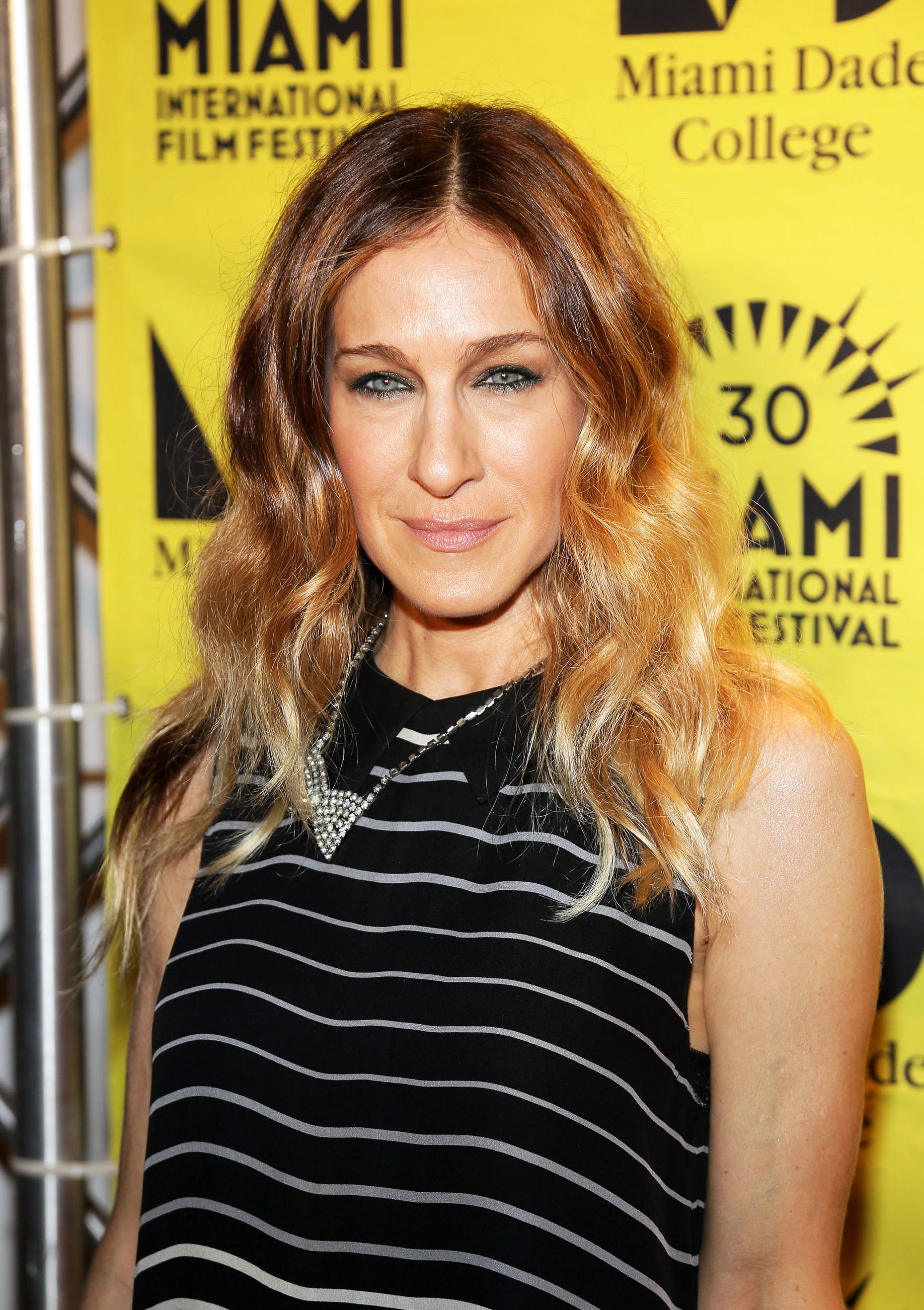
Sarah Jessica Parker, Best Actress in a Television Series – Musical or Comedy winner

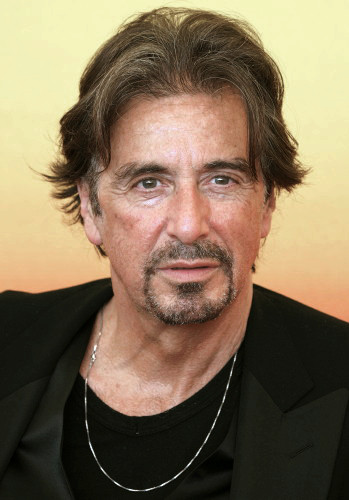
Al Pacino, Best Actor in a Miniseries or Television Film winner

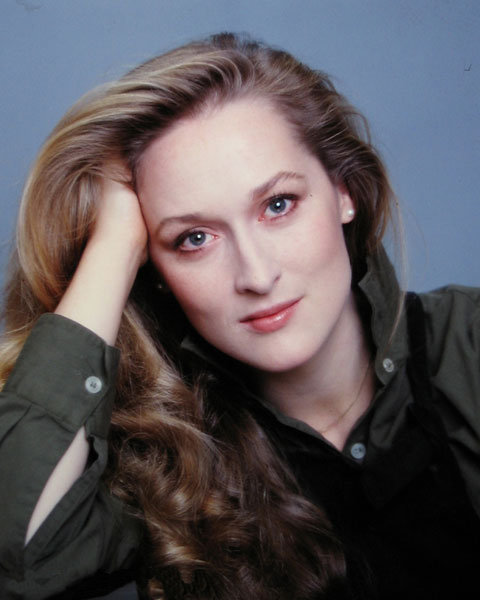
Meryl Streep, Best Actress in a Miniseries or Television Film winner

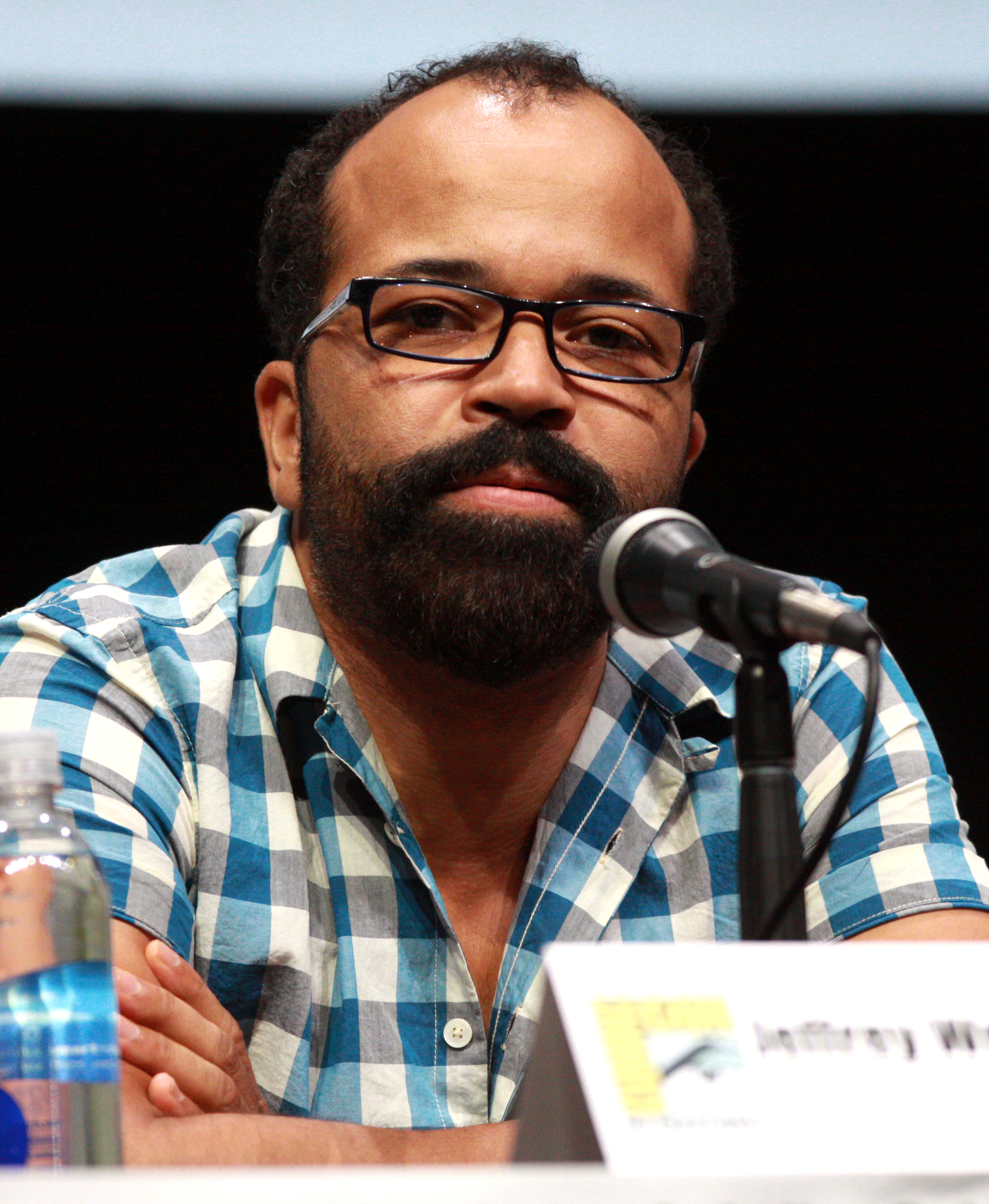
Jeffrey Wright, Best Supporting Actor in a Series, Miniseries, or Television Film winner

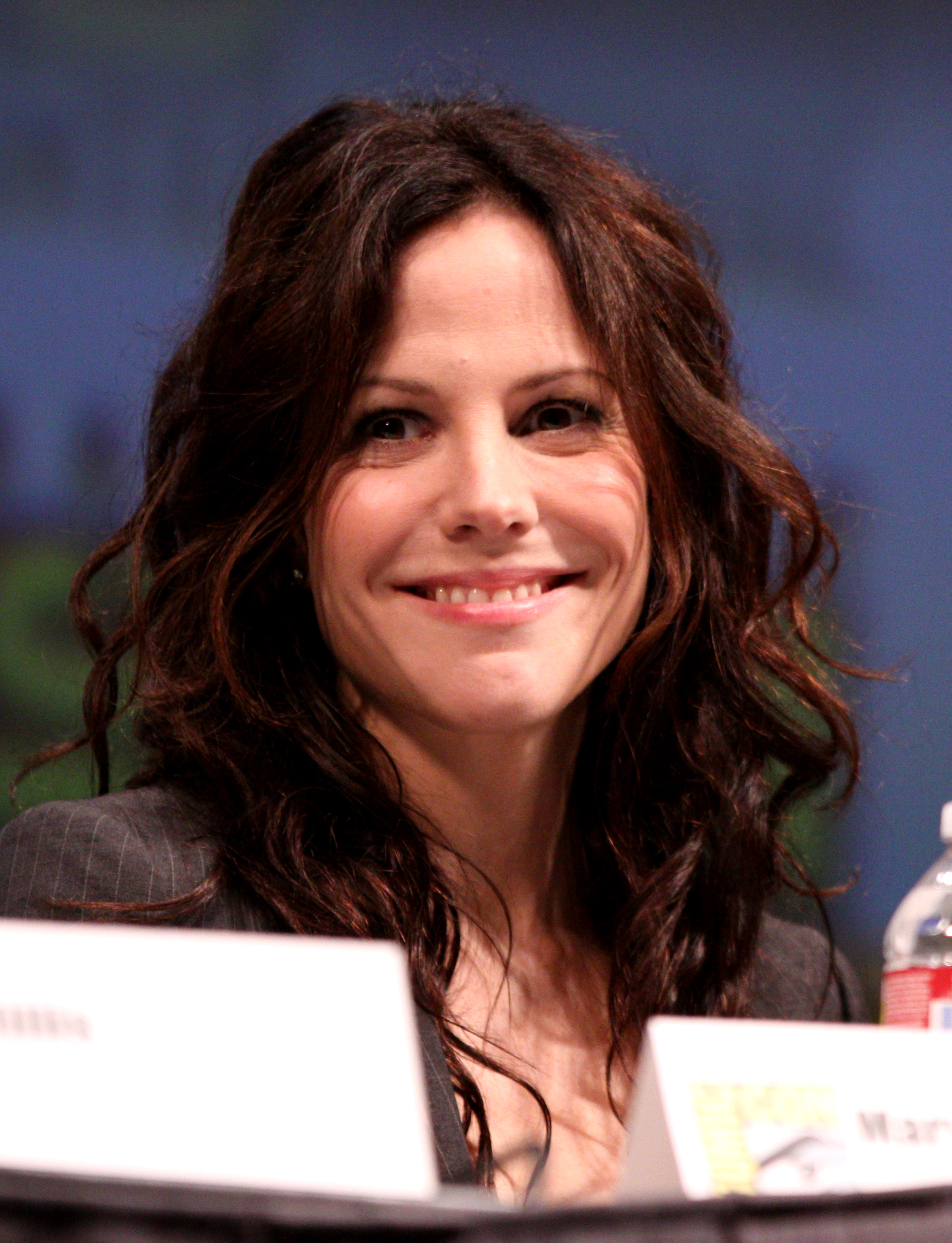
Mary-Louise Parker, Best Supporting Actress in a Series, Miniseries, or Television Film winner

These are the nominees for the 61st Golden Globe Awards. Winners are listed at the top of each list.

=== Film ===
Best Motion Picture
Drama	Musical or Comedy
The Lord of the Rings: The Return of the King; Cold Mountain; Master and Commander: The Far Side of the World; Mystic River; Seabiscuit	Lost in Translation; Bend It Like Beckham; Big Fish; Finding Nemo; Love Actually
Best Performance in a Motion Picture – Drama
Actor	Actress
Sean Penn – Mystic River as Jimmy Markum; Russell Crowe – Master and Commander: The Far Side of the World as Capt. Jack Aubrey; Tom Cruise – The Last Samurai as Capt. Nathan Algren; Ben Kingsley – House of Sand and Fog as Col. Massoud Amir Behrani; Jude Law – Cold Mountain as W. P. Inman	Charlize Theron – Monster as Aileen Wuornos; Cate Blanchett – Veronica Guerin as Veronica Guerin; Scarlett Johansson – Girl with a Pearl Earring as Griet; Nicole Kidman – Cold Mountain as Ada Monroe; Uma Thurman – Kill Bill: Volume 1 as The Bride; Evan Rachel Wood – Thirteen as Tracy Freeland
Best Performance in a Motion Picture – Musical or Comedy
Actor	Actress
Bill Murray – Lost in Translation as Bob Harris; Jack Black – School of Rock as Dewey Finn; Johnny Depp – Pirates of the Caribbean: The Curse of the Black Pearl as Captain Jack Sparrow; Jack Nicholson – Something's Gotta Give as Harry Sanborn; Billy Bob Thornton – Bad Santa as Willie T. Stokes	Diane Keaton – Something's Gotta Give as Erica Barry; Jamie Lee Curtis – Freaky Friday as Tess Coleman/Anna Coleman; Scarlett Johansson – Lost in Translation as Charlotte; Diane Lane – Under the Tuscan Sun as Frances Mayes; Helen Mirren – Calendar Girls as Chris Harper
Best Supporting Performance in a Motion Picture – Drama, Musical or Comedy
Supporting Actor	Supporting Actress
Tim Robbins – Mystic River as Dave Boyle; Alec Baldwin – The Cooler as Sheldon "Shelly" Kaplow; Albert Finney – Big Fish as the old Edward Bloom; William H. Macy – Seabiscuit as Tick Tock McGlaughlin; Peter Sarsgaard – Shattered Glass as Charles Lane; Ken Watanabe – The Last Samurai as Lord Moritsugu Katsumoto	Renée Zellweger – Cold Mountain as Ruby Thewes; Maria Bello – The Cooler as Natalie Belisario; Patricia Clarkson – Pieces of April as Joy Burns; Hope Davis – American Splendor as Joyce Brabner; Holly Hunter – Thirteen as Melanie Freeland
Best Director	Best Screenplay
Peter Jackson – The Lord of the Rings: The Return of the King; Sofia Coppola – Lost in Translation; Clint Eastwood – Mystic River; Anthony Minghella – Cold Mountain; Peter Weir – Master and Commander: The Far Side of the World	Sofia Coppola – Lost in Translation; Richard Curtis – Love Actually; Brian Helgeland – Mystic River; Anthony Minghella – Cold Mountain; Jim Sheridan, Kirsten Sheridan and Naomi Sheridan – In America
Best Original Score	Best Original Song
Howard Shore – The Lord of the Rings: The Return of the King; Alexandre Desplat – Girl with a Pearl Earring; Danny Elfman – Big Fish; Gabriel Yared – Cold Mountain; Hans Zimmer – The Last Samurai	"Into the West" (Annie Lennox, Fran Walsh and Howard Shore) – The Lord of the Rings: The Return of the King; "The Heart of Every Girl" (Elton John and Bernie Taupin) – Mona Lisa Smile; "Man of the Hour" (Eddie Vedder) – Big Fish; "Time Enough For Tears" (Bono, Gavin Friday and Maurice Seezer) – In America; "You Will Be My Ain True Love" (Sting) – Cold Mountain
Best Foreign Language Film	
Osama (Afghanistan); The Barbarian Invasions (Canada); Good Bye, Lenin! (Germany); Monsieur Ibrahim (France); The Return (Russia)	

The following films received multiple nominations:

Nominations	Title
8	Cold Mountain
5	Lost in Translation
5	Mystic River
4	Big Fish
4	The Lord of the Rings: The Return of the King
3	The Last Samurai
3	Master and Commander: The Far Side of the World
2	The Cooler
2	Girl with a Pearl Earring
2	In America
2	Love Actually
2	Something's Gotta Give
2	Thirteen
2	Seabiscuit

The following films received multiple wins:

Wins	Title
4	The Lord of the Rings: The Return of the King
3	Lost in Translation
2	Mystic River

=== Television ===
Best Television Series
Drama	Musical or Comedy
24 (Fox); CSI: Crime Scene Investigation (CBS); Nip/Tuck (FX); Six Feet Under (HBO); The West Wing (NBC)	The Office (BBC America); Arrested Development (Fox); Monk (USA Network); Sex and the City (HBO); Will & Grace (NBC)
Best Performance in a Television Series – Drama
Actor	Actress
Anthony LaPaglia – Without a Trace (CBS) as Jack Malone; Michael Chiklis – The Shield (FX) as Det. Vic Mackey; William Petersen – CSI: Crime Scene Investigation (CBS) as Gil Grissom; Martin Sheen – The West Wing (NBC) as Josiah Bartlet; Kiefer Sutherland – 24 (Fox) as Jack Bauer	Frances Conroy – Six Feet Under (HBO) as Ruth Fisher; Jennifer Garner – Alias (ABC) as Sydney Bristow; Allison Janney – The West Wing (NBC) as C. J. Cregg; Joely Richardson – Nip/Tuck (FX) as Julia McNamara; Amber Tamblyn – Joan of Arcadia (CBS) as Joan Girardi
Best Performance in a Television Series – Musical or Comedy
Actor	Actress
Ricky Gervais – The Office (BBC America) as David Brent; Matt LeBlanc – Friends (NBC) as Joey Tribbiani; Bernie Mac – The Bernie Mac Show (Fox) as Bernie McCullough; Eric McCormack – Will & Grace (NBC) as Will Truman; Tony Shalhoub – Monk (USA Network) as Adrian Monk	Sarah Jessica Parker – Sex and the City (HBO) as Carrie Bradshaw; Bonnie Hunt – Life with Bonnie (ABC) as Bonnie Malloy; Reba McEntire – Reba (The WB) as Reba Nell Hart; Debra Messing – Will & Grace (NBC) as Grace Adler; Alicia Silverstone – Miss Match (NBC) as Kate Fox
Best Performance in a Miniseries or Television Film
Actor	Actress
Al Pacino – Angels in America (HBO) as Roy Cohn; Antonio Banderas – And Starring Pancho Villa as Himself (HBO) as Pancho Villa; James Brolin – The Reagans (Showtime) as Ronald Reagan; Troy Garity – Soldier's Girl (Showtime) as Barry Winchell; Tom Wilkinson – Normal (HBO) as Ruth Applewood	Meryl Streep – Angels in America (HBO) as Hannah Pitt; Judy Davis – The Reagans (Showtime) as Nancy Reagan; Jessica Lange – Normal (HBO) as Irma Applewood; Helen Mirren – The Roman Spring of Mrs. Stone (Showtime) as Karen Stone; Maggie Smith – My House in Umbria (HBO) as Emily Delahunty
Best Supporting Performance in a Series, Miniseries or Television Film
Supporting Actor	Supporting Actress
Jeffrey Wright – Angels in America (HBO) as Norman "Belize" Ariaga; Sean Hayes – Will & Grace (NBC) as Jack McFarland; Lee Pace – Soldier's Girl (Showtime) as Calpernia Addams; Ben Shenkman – Angels in America (HBO) as Louis Ironson; Patrick Wilson – Angels in America (HBO) as Joe Pitt	Mary-Louise Parker – Angels in America (HBO) as Harper Pitt; Kim Cattrall – Sex and the City (HBO) as Samantha Jones; Kristin Davis – Sex and the City (HBO) as Charlotte York Goldenblatt; Megan Mullally – Will & Grace (NBC) as Karen Walker; Cynthia Nixon – Sex and the City (HBO) as Miranda Hobbes
Miniseries or Television Film
Angels in America (HBO); My House in Umbria (HBO); Normal (HBO); Soldier's Girl (Showtime); The Roman Spring of Mrs. Stone (Showtime)

The following programs received multiple nominations:

Nominations	Title
7	Angels in America
5	Sex and the City
5	Will & Grace
3	Monk
3	Normal
3	Soldier's Girl
3	The West Wing
2	24
2	CSI: Crime Scene Investigation
2	My House in Umbria
2	Nip/Tuck
2	The Reagans
2	The Roman Spring of Mrs. Stone
2	Six Feet Under
2	The Office

The following programs received multiple wins:

Wins	Title
5	Angels in America
2	The Office

== Ceremony ==
=== Presenters ===
- Jennifer Aniston
- Antonio Banderas
- Tyra Banks
- Jim Belushi
- Cate Blanchett
- Jeff Bridges
- Pierce Brosnan
- Ellen Burstyn
- Nicolas Cage
- Jim Carrey
- Kim Cattrall
- Chris Cooper
- Ice Cube
- Kristin Davis
- Ellen DeGeneres
- Danny DeVito
- Leonardo DiCaprio
- Sarah Ferguson
- Richard Gere
- Melanie Griffith
- Marg Helgenberger
- Dustin Hoffman
- Nicole Kidman
- Justin Kirk
- Ashton Kutcher
- Matt LeBlanc
- Jennifer Lopez
- Eva Mendes
- Brittany Murphy
- Jack Nicholson
- Cynthia Nixon
- Sarah Jessica Parker
- Queen Latifah
- Keanu Reeves
- Christina Ricci
- Mark Ruffalo
- Susan Sarandon
- Gwen Stefani
- Sharon Stone
- Meryl Streep
- Uma Thurman
- Robin Williams
- Elijah Wood
- Renee Zellweger

=== Cecil B. DeMille Award ===
Michael Douglas

=== Miss Golden Globe ===
Lily Costner (daughter of Kevin Costner & Cindy Costner)

== Awards breakdown ==
The following networks received multiple nominations:

Nominations	Network
18	HBO
12	NBC
7	Showtime
4	Fox
3	CBS
3	FX
3	USA
2	ABC

The following networks received multiple wins:

Wins	Network
5	HBO
2	NBC

== See also ==
- 76th Academy Awards
- 24th Golden Raspberry Awards
- 10th Screen Actors Guild Awards
- 55th Primetime Emmy Awards
- 56th Primetime Emmy Awards
- 57th British Academy Film Awards
- 58th Tony Awards
- 2003 in film
- 2003 in American television
