= Diane Keaton =

American actress (1946–2025)

- Keaton in 2007
- Born: Diane Hall; January 5, 1946; Los Angeles, California, U.S.
- Died: October 11, 2025 (aged 79); Santa Monica, California, U.S.
- Education: Santa Ana College; Orange Coast College; Neighborhood Playhouse
- Occupation: Actress
- Years active: 1968–2024
- Children: 2
- Awards: Full list

Diane Keaton (née Hall; January 5, 1946 – October 11, 2025) was an American actress. Her career spanned more than five decades, during which she rose to prominence in the New Hollywood movement. She collaborated frequently with Woody Allen, appearing in eight of his films. Keaton's accolades include an Academy Award, a BAFTA Award, and two Golden Globe Awards, along with nominations for two Emmy Awards and a Tony Award. She was honored with the Film at Lincoln Center Gala Tribute in 2007 and the AFI Life Achievement Award in 2017.

Keaton's career began on stage, acting in the ensemble of the original Broadway production of the musical Hair (1968) and the romantic interest in Woody Allen's comic play, Play It Again, Sam (1969), the latter of which earned her a nomination for a Tony Award for Best Featured Actress in a Play. She made her screen debut with a small role in Lovers and Other Strangers (1970) before rising to prominence with her first major film role as Kay Adams in Francis Ford Coppola's The Godfather (1972), a role she reprised in the sequels Part II (1974) and Part III (1990). She frequently collaborated with Allen establishing herself as a comic actress acting in the film adaptation of Play It Again, Sam (1972) followed by Sleeper (1973), Love and Death (1975), and Annie Hall (1977). The latter won her the Academy Award for Best Actress.

Keaton was also Oscar-nominated for her roles as activist Louise Bryant in the historical epic Reds (1981), a leukemia patient in the family drama Marvin's Room (1996), and a dramatist in the romantic comedy Something's Gotta Give (2003). She was known for her roles in dramatic films such as Looking for Mr. Goodbar (1977), Interiors (1978), Shoot the Moon (1982), and Crimes of the Heart (1986), as well as comedic roles in Manhattan (1979), Baby Boom (1987), Father of the Bride (1991), its 1995 sequel, Manhattan Murder Mystery (1993), The First Wives Club (1996), The Family Stone (2005), Finding Dory (2016), Book Club (2018), and its 2023 sequel. As a filmmaker, she directed three films and a documentary, Heaven (1987).

On television, she portrayed Amelia Earhart in the TNT film Amelia Earhart: The Final Flight (1994), which earned her nominations for the Primetime Emmy Award, Golden Globe Award, and Screen Actors Guild Award, and later a nun in the HBO limited series The Young Pope (2016). Keaton was also known for her distinct style and was often labeled a fashion icon and wrote four books, including her memoir Then Again (2011).

== Early life ==
Diane Hall was born on January 5, 1946, in Los Angeles to Dorothy Deanne (née Keaton; 1921–2008) and John Newton Ignatius "Jack" Hall (1922–1990), She was the eldest of their four children. Dorothy was a homemaker and amateur photographer; Jack was a real estate broker and civil engineer. Through his matriline, Jack was half-Irish. Keaton was raised a Free Methodist by her mother. Her mother won the "Mrs. Los Angeles" pageant for homemakers; Keaton said that the theatricality of the event inspired her first impulse to become an actress and ultimately her desire to work on stage. She also credited Katharine Hepburn, whom she admired for playing strong and independent women, as one of her inspirations.

Keaton was a 1963 graduate of Santa Ana High School in Santa Ana, California. During her time there, she participated in singing and acting clubs at school, and starred as Blanche DuBois in a school production of A Streetcar Named Desire. After graduation, she attended Santa Ana College and later Orange Coast College as an acting student, but dropped out after a year to pursue an entertainment career in Manhattan. After joining the Actors' Equity Association, she changed her surname to Keaton, which was her mother's maiden name, as there was already an actress registered under the name of Diane Hall. For a brief time she also moonlighted at nightclubs with a singing act. She revisited her nightclub act in Annie Hall (1977), And So It Goes (2014), and a cameo in Radio Days (1987).

Keaton began studying acting at the Neighborhood Playhouse in Midtown Manhattan, New York. She initially studied acting under the Meisner technique, an ensemble acting technique first evolved in the 1930s by Sanford Meisner, a New York stage actor, acting coach and director who had been a member of The Group Theater (1931–1940). She said that her acting technique was "only as good as the person you're acting with... As opposed to going it on my own and forging my path to create a wonderful performance without the help of anyone. I always need the help of everyone!" According to fellow actor Jack Nicholson, "She approaches a script sort of like a play in that she has the entire script memorized before you start doing the movie, which I don't know any other actors doing that."

== Career ==
=== 1968–1979: The Godfather films and stardom with Annie Hall ===
In 1968, Keaton became an understudy for the part of Sheila in the original Broadway production of Hair. She gained some notoriety for her refusal to disrobe at the end of Act I when the cast performs nude, even though nudity in the production was optional for actors (those who performed nude received a $50 bonus). After acting in Hair for nine months, she auditioned for a part in Woody Allen's production of Play It Again, Sam. After nearly being passed over for being too tall (at 5 ft 8 in (173 cm) she was 2 inches (5 cm) taller than Allen) she won the part. She went on to receive a Tony Award nomination for Best Featured Actress in a Play for her performance.

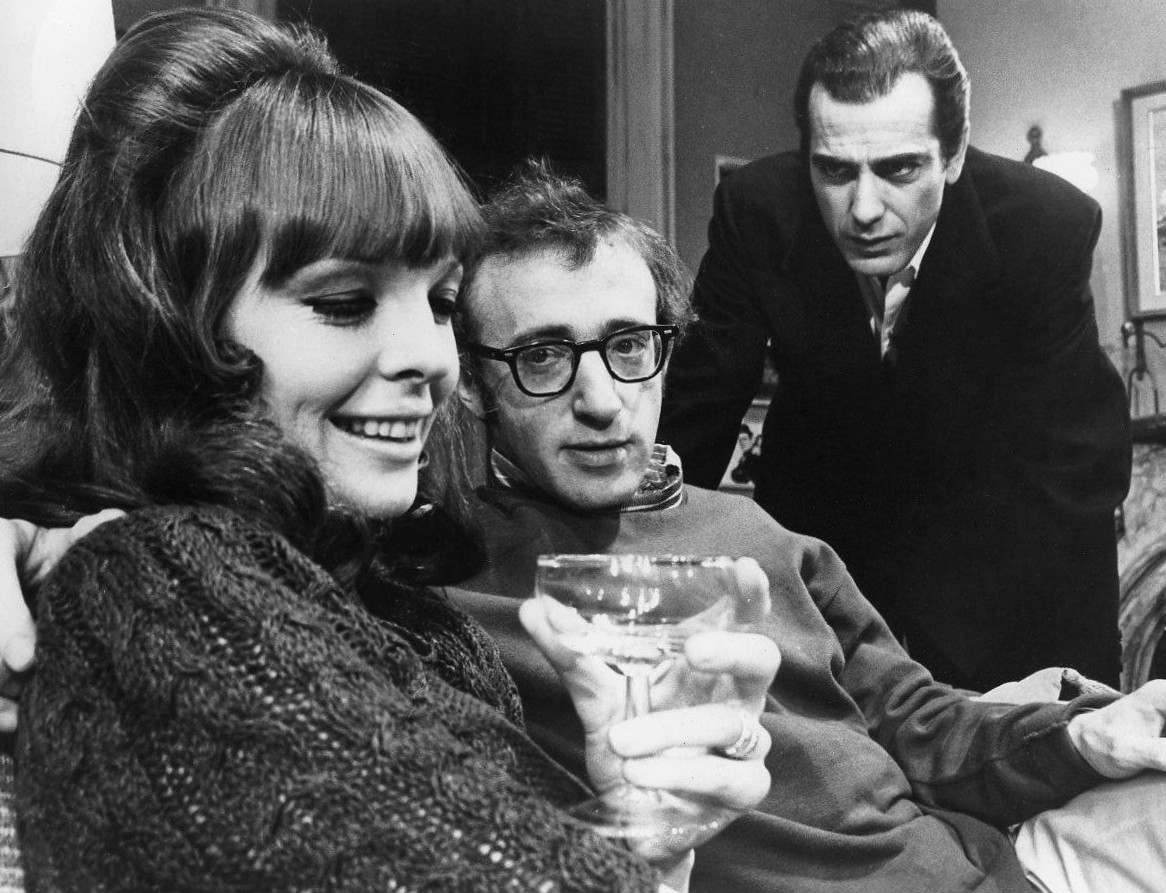
Keaton with Woody Allen and Jerry Lacy in the play Play It Again, Sam

In 1970, Keaton appeared in a deodorant commercial for Hour After Hour. That same year, she made her film debut in Lovers and Other Strangers. She followed with guest roles on the television series Love, American Style; Night Gallery; and Mannix.

Keaton's breakthrough role came two years later when she was cast as Kay Adams, the girlfriend and eventual wife of Michael Corleone (played by Al Pacino) in Francis Ford Coppola's 1972 film The Godfather. Coppola noted that he first noticed Keaton in Lovers and Other Strangers, and cast her because of her reputation for eccentricity that he wanted her to bring to the role (Keaton claimed that at the time she was commonly referred to as "the kooky actress" of the film industry). Her performance in the film was loosely based on her real-life experience of making the film, both of which she described as being "the woman in a world of men." The Godfather was an unparalleled critical and financial success, becoming the highest-grossing film of the year and winning the 1972 Academy Award for Best Picture. She reprised her role as Kay Adams in The Godfather Part II (1974). She was initially reluctant, saying, "At first, I was skeptical about playing Kay again in the Godfather sequel. But when I read the script, the character seemed much more substantial than in the first film." In Part II, her character changed dramatically, becoming more embittered about her husband's criminal empire. Even though Keaton received widespread exposure from the films, some critics felt that her character's importance was minimal. Time wrote that she was "invisible in The Godfather and pallid in The Godfather Part II, but according to Empire magazine, Keaton "proves the quiet lynchpin which is no mean feat in [the] necessarily male dominated films."

Keaton's other notable films of the 1970s included many collaborations with Woody Allen. She played many eccentric characters in several of his comic and dramatic films, including Sleeper; Love and Death; Interiors; Manhattan; Manhattan Murder Mystery and the film version of Play It Again, Sam, directed by Herbert Ross. Allen credited Keaton as his muse during his early film career. In 1976, Keaton starred Off-Broadway in the world premier of the Israel Horovitz play Primary English Class at Circle in the Square Theatre. The New York Times review noted, "Keaton gives a delightful portrait of a woman sinking slowly out of control."

In 1977, Keaton won the Academy Award for Best Actress for Allen's romantic comedy-drama Annie Hall, one of her most famous roles. Annie Hall, written by Allen and Marshall Brickman and directed by Allen, was believed by many to be an autobiographical exploration of his relationship with Keaton. Allen based the character of Annie Hall loosely on Keaton ("Annie" was a nickname of hers, and "Hall" was her original surname). Many of Keaton's mannerisms and self-deprecating sense of humor were added into the role by Allen. (Director Nancy Meyers has claimed: "Diane's the most self-deprecating person alive.") Keaton also said that Allen wrote the character as an "idealized version" of herself. The two starred as a frequently on-again, off-again couple living in New York City. Her acting was later summed up by CNN as "awkward, self-deprecating, speaking in endearing little whirlwinds of semi-logic", and by Allen as a "nervous breakdown in slow motion." Annie Hall emerged as a major critical and commercial success and won the Academy Award for Best Picture. Of Keaton's performance, feminist film critic Molly Haskell wrote, "Keaton took me by surprise in Annie Hall. Here she blossomed into something more than just another kooky dame—she put the finishing touches on a type, the anti-goddess, the golden shiksa from the provinces who looks cool and together, who looks as if she must have a date on Saturday night, but has only to open her mouth or gulp or dart spastically sideways to reveal herself as the insecure bungler she is, as complete a social disaster in her own way as Allen's horny West Side intellectual is in his." In 2006, Premiere magazine ranked Keaton in Annie Hall 60th on its list of the "100 Greatest Performances of All Time", and noted:

It's hard to play ditzy... The genius of Annie is that despite her loopy backhand, awful driving, and nervous tics, she's also a complicated, intelligent woman. Keaton brilliantly displays this dichotomy of her character, especially when she yammers away on a first date with Alvy (Woody Allen), while the subtitle reads, 'He probably thinks I'm a yoyo.' Yo-yo? Hardly.

Keaton's eccentric wardrobe in Annie Hall, which consisted mainly of vintage men's clothing, including neckties, vests, baggy pants, and fedora hats, made her an unlikely fashion icon of the late 1970s. A small amount of the clothing seen in the film came from Keaton herself, who was already known for her tomboyish clothing style years before Annie Hall, and Ruth Morley designed the film's costumes. Soon after the film's release, men's clothing and pantsuits became popular attire for women. She was known to favor men's vintage clothing, and usually appeared in public wearing gloves and conservative attire. (A 2005 profile in the San Francisco Chronicle described her as "easy to find. Look for the only woman in sight dressed in a turtleneck. On a 90-degree afternoon in Pasadena.")

Her photo by Douglas Kirkland appeared on the cover of the September 26, 1977, issue of Time magazine, with the story dubbing her "the funniest woman now working in films." Later that year she departed from her usual lighthearted comic roles when she won the highly coveted lead role in the drama Looking for Mr. Goodbar, based on the novel by Judith Rossner. In the film, written and directed by Richard Brooks, she played a Catholic schoolteacher for deaf children who lives a double life, spending nights frequenting singles bars and engaging in promiscuous sex. Keaton became interested in the role after seeing it as a "psychological case history." The same issue of Time commended her role choice and criticized the restricted roles available for female actors in American films:

A male actor can fly a plane, fight a war, shoot a badman, pull off a sting, impersonate a big cheese in business or politics. Men are presumed to be interesting. A female can play a wife, play a whore, get pregnant, lose her baby, and, um, let's see ... Women are presumed to be dull. ... Now a determined trend spotter can point to a handful of new films whose makers think that women can bear the dramatic weight of a production alone, or virtually so. Then there is Diane Keaton in Looking for Mr. Goodbar. As Theresa Dunn, Keaton dominates this raunchy, risky, violent dramatization of Judith Rossner's 1975 novel about a schoolteacher who cruises singles bars.

In addition to acting, Keaton said she "had a lifelong ambition to be a singer." She had a brief, unrealized career as a recording artist in the 1970s. Her first record was an original cast recording of Hair, in 1971. In 1977 she began recording tracks for a solo album, but the finished record never materialized.

Keaton met with more success in the medium of still photography. Like her character in Annie Hall, Keaton had long relished photography as a favorite hobby, an interest she picked up as a teenager from her mother. While traveling in the late 1970s, she began exploring her avocation more seriously. "Rolling Stone had asked me to take photographs for them, and I thought, 'Wait a minute, what I'm really interested in is these lobbies, and these strange ballrooms in these old hotels.' So I began shooting them", she recalled in 2003. "These places were deserted, and I could just sneak in anytime and nobody cared. It was so easy and I could do it myself. It was an adventure for me." Reservations, her collection of photos of hotel interiors, was published in book form in 1980.

=== 1980–1989: Established actress and continued acclaim ===
With Manhattan (1979), Keaton and Allen ended their long working relationship; it was their last major collaboration until 1993. Then, in 1978, she became romantically involved with Warren Beatty and he cast her opposite him in the epic historical drama Reds. In the film, she played Louise Bryant, a journalist and feminist, who flees her husband to work with radical journalist John Reed (Beatty) and later enters Russia to find him as he chronicles the Russian Civil War. Beatty began developing Reds in the 1960s, with historical research and interviews underway by the early 1970s. After years of development, filming began in 1979.

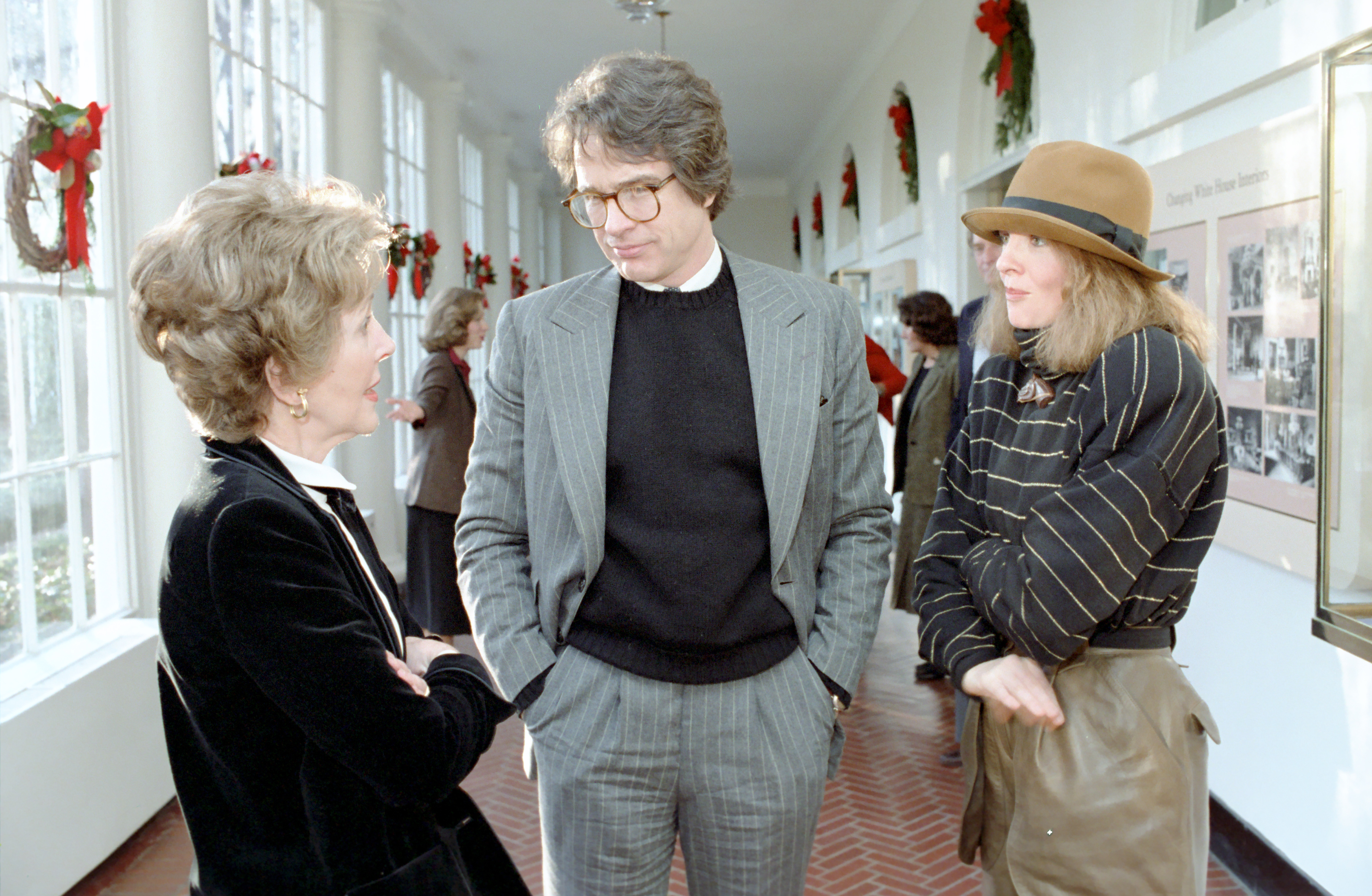
Keaton (right) at the White House with First Lady Nancy Reagan and Warren Beatty (December 1981)

In a 2006 Vanity Fair article, Keaton talked about her role saying that she was "the everyman of that piece, as someone who wanted to be extraordinary but was probably more ordinary... I knew what it felt like to be extremely insecure." Assistant director Simon Relph later said that Louise Bryant was one of Keaton's most difficult roles, and that "[she] almost got broken." Reds opened to widespread critical acclaim, and Keaton's performance was highly praised in particular. The New York Times wrote that Keaton was "nothing less than splendid as Louise Bryant–beautiful, selfish, funny and driven. It's the best work she has done to date." Roger Ebert called Keaton "a particular surprise. I had somehow gotten into the habit of expecting her to be a touchy New Yorker, sweet, scared, and intellectual. Here, she is just what she needs to be: plucky, healthy, exasperated, loyal, and funny." Keaton received her second Academy Award for Best Actress nomination for her performance.

In 1982, Keaton starred in the domestic drama Shoot the Moon opposite Albert Finney. The film is about George (Finney) and Faith Dunlap (Keaton), whose deteriorating marriage, separation, and love affairs devastate their four children. Shoot the Moon received mostly positive reviews from critics and Keaton's performance was again praised. In The New Yorker, Pauline Kael wrote the film was "perhaps the most revealing American movie of the era", and that Keaton "may be a star without vanity: she's so completely challenged by the role of Faith that all she cares about is getting the character right. Very few young American movie actresses have the strength and the instinct for the toughest dramatic roles—intelligent, sophisticated heroines. Jane Fonda did, around the time that she appeared in Klute and They Shoot Horses, Don't They?, but that was more than ten years ago. There hasn't been anybody else until now. Diane Keaton acts on a different plane from that of her previous film roles; she brings the character a full measure of dread and awareness and does it in a special, intuitive way that's right for screen acting." David Denby of New York magazine called Keaton "perfectly relaxed and self-assured", adding, "Keaton has always found it easy enough to bring out the anger that lies beneath the soft hesitancy of her surface manner, but she's never dug down and found this much pain before. Keaton's performance garnered her a second Golden Globe nomination in a row for Best Actress in a Motion Picture – Drama, following Reds.

1984 brought The Little Drummer Girl, Keaton's first excursion into the thriller and action genre. The Little Drummer Girl was both a financial and critical failure, with critics claiming that Keaton was miscast for the genre, such as one review from The New Republic claiming that "the title role, the pivotal role, is played by Diane Keaton, and around her the picture collapses in tatters. She is so feeble, so inappropriate." But the same year, she received positive reviews for her performance in Mrs. Soffel, a film based on the true story of a repressed prison warden's wife who falls in love with a convicted murderer and arranges for his escape. Two years later, she starred with Jessica Lange and Sissy Spacek in Crimes of the Heart, adapted from Beth Henley's Pulitzer Prize–winning play into a moderately successful screen comedy. Keaton's performance was well received by critics, and Rita Kempley of The Washington Post wrote, "As the frumpy Lenny, Keaton eases smoothly from New York neurotic to southern eccentric, a reluctant wallflower stymied by, of all things, her shriveled ovary."

In 1987, Keaton starred in Baby Boom, her first of four collaborations with writer-producer Nancy Meyers. She played a Manhattan career woman who is suddenly forced to care for a toddler. A modest box-office success, Keaton's performance was singled out by Kael, who described it as "a glorious comedy performance that rides over many of the inanities in this picture. Keaton is smashing: the Tiger Lady's having all this drive is played for farce and Keaton keeps you alert to every shade of pride and panic the character feels. She's an ultra-feminine executive, a wide-eyed charmer, with a breathless ditziness that may remind you of Jean Arthur in The More The Merrier." That same year, Keaton made a cameo in Allen's film Radio Days as a nightclub singer. 1988's The Good Mother was a financial disappointment (according to Keaton, the film was "a Big Failure. Like, BIG failure"), and some critics panned her performance; according to The Washington Post, "her acting degenerates into hype—as if she's trying to sell an idea she can't fully believe in."

In 1987, Keaton directed and edited her first feature film, Heaven, a documentary about the possibility of an afterlife. It met with mixed critical reaction, with The New York Times likening it to "a conceit imposed on its subjects." Over the next four years, Keaton directed music videos for artists such as Belinda Carlisle, including the video for Carlisle's chart-topping hit "Heaven Is a Place on Earth", two television films starring Patricia Arquette, and episodes of the series China Beach and Twin Peaks.

=== 1990–1999: Mature roles and reunion with Woody Allen ===
By the 1990s, Keaton had established herself as one of the most popular and versatile actresses in Hollywood. She shifted to more mature roles, frequently playing matriarchs of middle-class families. Of her role choices and avoidance of becoming typecast, she said: "Most often a particular role does you some good and Bang! You have loads of offers, all of them for similar roles ... I have tried to break away from the usual roles and have tried my hand at several things."

Keaton began the decade with The Lemon Sisters, a poorly-received comedy-drama that she starred in and produced, which was shelved for a year after its completion. In 1991 she starred with Steve Martin in the family comedy Father of the Bride. She was almost not cast in the film, as The Good Mother's commercial failure had strained her relationship with Walt Disney Pictures, the studio of both films. Father of the Bride was Keaton's first major hit after four years of commercial disappointments. She reprised her role four years later in the sequel, as a woman who becomes pregnant in middle age at the same time as her daughter. A San Francisco Examiner review of the film was one of many in which Keaton was once again compared to Katharine Hepburn: "No longer relying on that stuttering uncertainty that seeped into all her characterizations of the 1970s, she has somehow become Katharine Hepburn with a deep maternal instinct, that is, she is a fine and intelligent actress who doesn't need to be tough and edgy in order to prove her feminism."

Keaton reprised her role of Kay Adams in 1990's The Godfather Part III, set 20 years after the end of The Godfather, Part II. In 1993, Keaton starred in the black comedy mystery Manhattan Murder Mystery, her first major film role in an Allen film since 1979. Her part was originally intended for Mia Farrow, but Farrow was dropped from the project after breaking up with Allen. Todd McCarthy of Variety commended her performance, writing that she "nicely handles her sometimes buffoonish central comedic role". David Ansen of Newsweek wrote, "On screen, Keaton and Allen have always been made for each other: they still strike wonderfully ditsy sparks". For her performance, Keaton was nominated for the Golden Globe Award for Best Actress – Motion Picture Comedy or Musical.

In 1995, Keaton directed Unstrung Heroes, her first theatrically released narrative film. The film, adapted from Franz Lidz's memoir, starred Nathan Watt as a boy in the 1960s whose mother (Andie MacDowell) is diagnosed with cancer. As her sickness advances and his inventor father (John Turturro) grows increasingly distant, the boy is sent to live with his two eccentric uncles (Maury Chaykin and Michael Richards). Keaton switched the story's setting from the New York of Lidz's book to the Southern California of her own childhood, and the four mad uncles were reduced to a whimsical odd couple. In an essay for The New York Times, Lidz said that the cinematic Selma had died not of cancer, but of "Old Movie Disease". "Someday somebody may find a cure for cancer, but the terminal sappiness of cancer movies is probably beyond remedy." Unstrung Heroes played in a relatively limited release and made little impression at the box office, but the film and its direction were generally well-received critically.

Keaton's most successful film of the decade was the 1996 comedy The First Wives Club. She starred with Goldie Hawn and Bette Midler as a trio of "first wives": middle-aged women who had been divorced by their husbands in favor of younger women. Keaton claimed that making the film "saved [her] life." The film was a major success, grossing US$105 million at the North American box office, and it developed a cult following among middle-aged women. Its reviews were generally positive for Keaton and her co-stars, and the San Francisco Chronicle called her "probably [one of] the best comic film actresses alive." In 1997 Keaton, Hawn, and Midler received the Women in Film Crystal Award, which honors "outstanding women who, through their endurance and the excellence of their work, have helped to expand the role of women within the entertainment industry."

Also in 1996, Keaton starred as Bessie, a woman with leukemia, in Marvin's Room, an adaptation of the play by Scott McPherson. Meryl Streep played her estranged sister, Lee, and had also initially been considered for the role of Bessie. The film also starred Leonardo DiCaprio as Lee's rebellious son. Roger Ebert wrote, "Streep and Keaton, in their different styles, find ways to make Lee and Bessie into much more than the expression of their problems." Keaton earned a third Academy Award nomination for the film, which was critically acclaimed. She said the role's biggest challenge was understanding the mentality of a person with a terminal illness. Keaton next starred in The Only Thrill (1997) opposite her Baby Boom co-star Sam Shephard, and had a supporting role in The Other Sister (1999). In 1999, she narrated the one-hour public radio documentary "If I Get Out Alive", the first to focus on the conditions and brutality young people face in the adult correctional system. The program, produced by Lichtenstein Creative Media, aired on public radio stations across the country and was honored with a First Place National Headliner Award and a Casey Medal for Meritorious Journalism.

=== 2000–2009: Comedy films and resurgence ===
Keaton's first film of 2000 was Hanging Up, with Meg Ryan and Lisa Kudrow. She directed the film, despite claiming in a 1996 interview that she would never direct herself in a film, saying "as a director, you automatically have different goals. I can't think about directing when I'm acting." A drama about three sisters coping with the senility and eventual death of their elderly father (Walter Matthau), Hanging Up rated poorly with critics and grossed a modest $36 million at the North American box office.

In 2001, Keaton co-starred with Beatty in Town & Country, a critical and financial fiasco. Budgeted at an estimated $90 million, the film opened to little notice and grossed only $7 million in its North American theatrical run. Peter Travers of Rolling Stone wrote that Town & Country was "less deserving of a review than it is an obituary....The corpse took with it the reputations of its starry cast, including Beatty and Keaton." In 2001 and 2002, Keaton starred in four low-budget television films. She played a fanatical nun in the religious drama Sister Mary Explains It All, an impoverished mother in the drama On Thin Ice, and a bookkeeper in the mob comedy Plan B. In Crossed Over, she played Beverly Lowry, a woman who forms an unusual friendship with the only woman executed while on death row in Texas, Karla Faye Tucker.

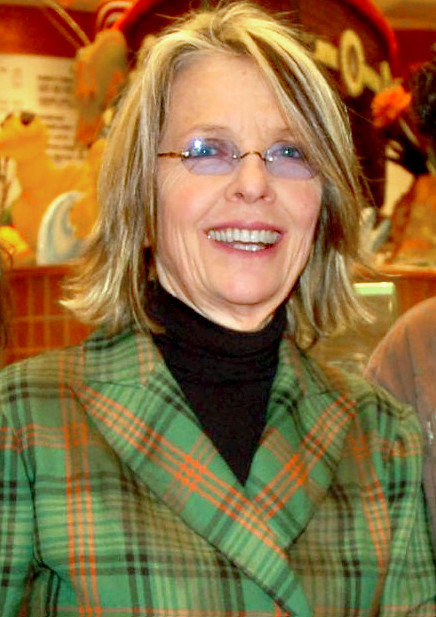
Keaton in 2007

Keaton's first major hit since 1996 came with the 2003 romantic comedy Something's Gotta Give, directed by Nancy Meyers and co-starring Jack Nicholson. According to Meyers, studios initially passed on the project, with the director recalling that "no one wanted to see people of a certain age be sexy." Keaton told Ladies' Home Journal, "Let's face it, people my age and Jack's age are much deeper, much more soulful, because they've seen a lot of life. They have a great deal of passion and hope—why shouldn't they fall in love? Why shouldn't movies show that?" Keaton played a middle-aged playwright who falls in love with her daughter's much older boyfriend. The film was a major success at the box office, grossing $125 million in North America. Roger Ebert wrote, "Keaton and Nicholson bring so much experience, knowledge and humor to their characters that the film works in ways the screenplay might not have even hoped for." Keaton received her fourth Academy Award nomination for her performance.

Keaton's only film between 2004 and 2006 was the comedy The Family Stone (2005), starring an ensemble cast. In the film, scripted and directed by Thomas Bezucha, Keaton played a breast cancer survivor and matriarch of a big New England family that reunites at the parents' home for its annual Christmas holidays. The film released to moderate critical and commercial success, and earned $92.2 million worldwide. Keaton received her second Satellite Award nomination for her performance, of which Peter Travers of Rolling Stone wrote, "Keaton, a sorceress at blending humor and heartbreak, honors the film with a grace that makes it stick in the memory."

In 2007, Keaton starred in both Because I Said So and Mama's Boy. In the romantic comedy Because I Said So, directed by Michael Lehmann, Keaton played a long-divorced mother of three daughters, determined to pair off her only single daughter, Milly (Mandy Moore). Also starring Stephen Collins and Gabriel Macht, the project opened to overwhelmingly negative reviews, with Wesley Morris of The Boston Globe calling it "a sloppily made bowl of reheated chick-flick cliches", and was ranked among the worst-reviewed films of the year. The following year Keaton received her first and only Golden Raspberry Award nomination to date for the film. In Mama's Boy, director Tim Hamilton's feature film debut, Keaton starred as the mother of a self-absorbed 29-year-old (Jon Heder) whose world turns upside down when she starts dating and considers kicking him out of the house. Distributed for a limited release to certain parts of the United States only, the independent comedy garnered largely negative reviews.

In 2008, Keaton starred alongside Dax Shepard and Liv Tyler in Vince Di Meglio's dramedy Smother, playing the overbearing mother of an unemployed therapist, who decides to move in with him and his girlfriend after breaking up with her husband (Ken Howard). As with Mama's Boy, the film received a limited release only, resulting in a gross of $1.8 million worldwide. Critical reaction to the film was generally unfavorable. Also in 2008, Keaton appeared alongside Katie Holmes and Queen Latifah in the crime-comedy film Mad Money, directed by Callie Khouri. Based on the British television drama Hot Money (2001), the film revolves around three female employees of the Federal Reserve who scheme to steal money that is about to be destroyed.

=== 2010–2016: Continued comedic roles and voice work ===
In 2010, Keaton starred alongside Rachel McAdams and Harrison Ford in Roger Michell's comedy Morning Glory, playing the veteran TV host of a fictional morning talk show that desperately needs to boost its lagging ratings. Portraying a narcissistic character who will do anything to please the audience, Keaton described her role as "the kind of woman you love to hate." Inspired by Neil Simon's 1972 Broadway play The Sunshine Boys, the film was a moderate success at the box office, taking a worldwide total of almost $59 million. Keaton was generally praised for her performance, with James Berardinelli of ReelViews writing, "Keaton is so good at her part that one can see her sliding effortlessly into an anchor's chair on a real morning show."

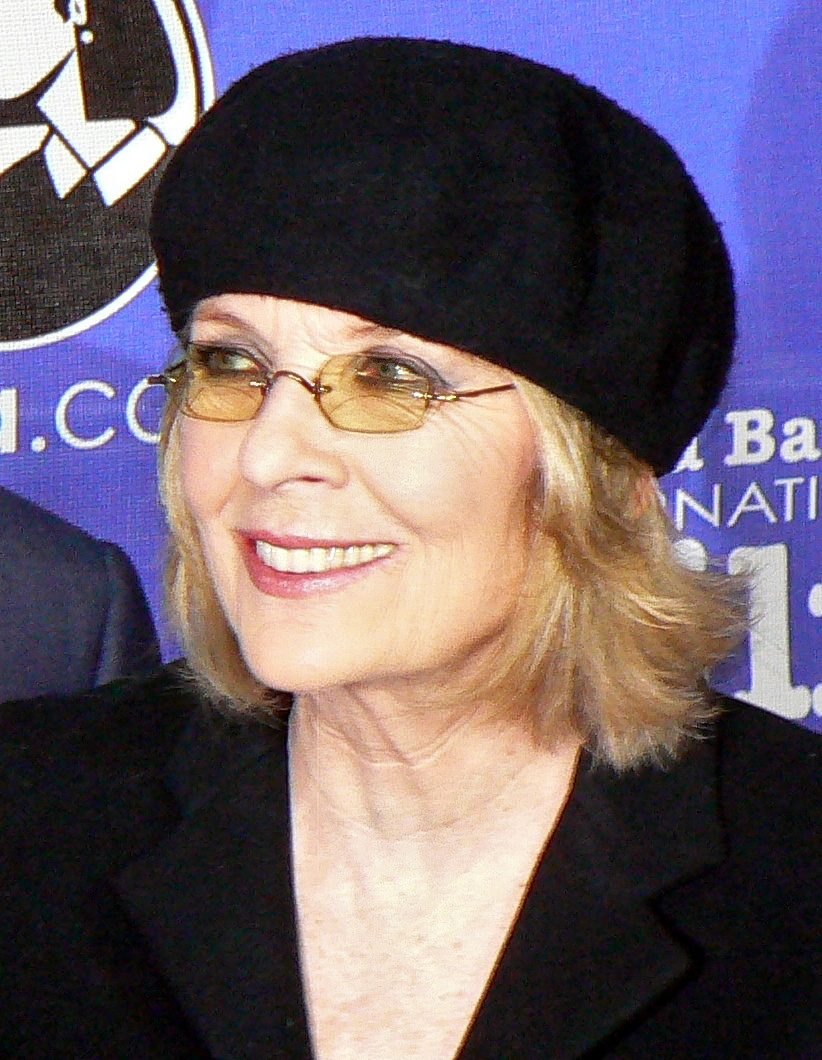
Keaton at the 2012 Santa Barbara International Film Festival in Santa Barbara, California

In fall 2010, Keaton joined the production of the comedy-drama Darling Companion by Lawrence Kasdan, which was released in 2012. Co-starring Kevin Kline and Dianne Wiest and set in Telluride, Colorado, the film follows a woman, played by Keaton, whose husband loses her much-beloved dog at a wedding held at their vacation home in the Rocky Mountains, resulting in a search party to find the pet. Kasdan's first film in nine years, the film bombed at the U.S. box office, where it scored about $790,000 throughout its entire theatrical run. Critics dismissed the film as "an overwritten, underplotted vanity project" but applauded Keaton's performance. Ty Burr of The Boston Globe wrote that the film "would be instantly forgettable if not for Keaton, who imbues [her role] with a sorrow, warmth, wisdom, and rage that feel earned [...] Her performance here is an extension of worn, resilient grace."

Also in 2011, Keaton began production on Justin Zackham's 2013 ensemble family comedy The Big Wedding, a remake of the 2006 French film Mon frère se marie in which she, along with Robert De Niro, played a long-divorced couple who, for the sake of their adopted son's wedding and his very religious biological mother, pretend they are still married. The film received largely negative reviews. In 2014, Keaton starred in And So It Goes and 5 Flights Up. In Rob Reiner's romantic dramedy And So It Goes, Keaton portrayed a widowed lounge singer who finds autumnal love with a bad boy (Michael Douglas). The film received largely negative reviews. One critic wrote that "And So It Goes aims for comedy, but with two talented actors stuck in a half-hearted effort from a once-mighty filmmaker, it ends in unintentional tragedy." Keaton co-starred with Morgan Freeman in Richard Loncraine's comedy-drama 5 Flights Up, based on Jill Ciment's novel Heroic Measures. They play a long-married couple who have an eventful weekend after they are forced to contemplate selling their beloved Brooklyn apartment. Shot in New York, the film premiered, under its former name Ruth & Alex, at the 2014 Toronto International Film Festival. The same year Keaton became the first woman to receive the Golden Lion Award at the Zurich Film Festival.

Keaton's only film of 2015 was Love the Coopers, an ensemble comedy about a troubled family getting together for Christmas, for which she reunited with Because I Said So writer Jessie Nelson. Also starring John Goodman, Ed Helms, and Marisa Tomei, Keaton was attached for several years before the film went into production. Her casting was instrumental in financing and recruiting most of the other actors, which led her to an executive producer credit in the film. Love the Coopers received largely negative reviews from critics, who called it a "bittersweet blend of holiday cheer", and became a moderate commercial success at a worldwide total of $41.1 million against a budget of $17 million. Also in 2015 Netflix announced the comedy Divanation, for which Keaton was expected to reunite with her First Wives Club co-stars Midler and Hawn to portray a former singing group, but the project failed to materialize.

Keaton voiced amnesiac fish Dory's mother in Disney and Pixar's Finding Dory (2016), the sequel to the 2003 Pixar animated film Finding Nemo. The film was a critical and commercial success, grossing over $1 billion worldwide, the second Pixar film to cross this mark after Toy Story 3 (2010). It also set numerous records, including the biggest animated opening of all time in North America, emerging as the biggest animated film of all time in the United States. Keaton's other project of 2016 was the HBO eight-part series The Young Pope, in which she played a nun who raised the newly elected Pope (Jude Law) and helped him reach the papacy. The miniseries received two nominations for the 69th Primetime Creative Arts Emmy Awards, becoming the first Italian TV series to be nominated for Primetime Emmy Awards.

=== 2017–2024: Later film roles, fashion ventures, and music debut ===
In 2017, Keaton appeared opposite Brendan Gleeson in the British dramedy film Hampstead. Based on the life of Harry Hallowes, it depicts an American widow (Keaton) who helps a local man defending his ramshackle hut and the life he has been leading on Hampstead Heath for 17 years. The specialty release had a mixed reception from critics, who were unimpressed by the film's "deeply mediocre story", but became a minor commercial success. Keaton's only project of 2018 was Book Club, in which she, Jane Fonda, Candice Bergen, and Mary Steenburgen play four friends who read Fifty Shades of Grey as part of their monthly book club and subsequently begin to change how they view their personal relationships. The romantic comedy received mixed reviews from critics, who felt that Book Club only "intermittently rises to the level of its impressive veteran cast," but with a worldwide gross of over $100 million, became Keaton's biggest commercial success in a non-voice role since 2003's Something's Gotta Give.

In 2019, Keaton starred in the comedy Poms as a woman dying of cancer who starts a cheerleading squad with other female residents of a retirement home. The film was a box office disappointment and was negatively received by critics. In 2020, Keaton reprised the role of Nina Banks in Nancy Meyers' short film Father of the Bride Part 3(ish), a legacy-sequel which takes place chronologically after the events of Father of the Bride Part II (1995). A screenlife story, it was distributed by Netflix, through the streaming company's YouTube and Facebook channels. Keaton's other project that year was Dennis Dugan's romantic comedy Love, Weddings & Other Disasters, in which she played a blind woman who unexpectedly falls for a stuffy mayor. Also starring Jeremy Irons, Maggie Grace, and Andrew Bachelor, it was a critical and commercial failure.

In 2022's Mack & Rita, Keaton played the older version of a 30-year-old woman (Elizabeth Lail) who transforms into her 70-year-old self. The film was released to negative reviews from critics and earned Keaton her second Golden Raspberry Award nomination in the Worst Actress category. Also in 2022, she released the photography‑book Saved and collaborated on a textile collection with high‑end textiles brand S. Harris on a collection of over 50 fabrics, called Elements by Diane Keaton. In 2023, Keaton starred opposite Richard Gere, Susan Sarandon, and William H. Macy in Michael Jacobs's directorial debut Maybe I Do. A romantic comedy about a couple whose plans for marriage are upended when they discover their parents are entangled in affairs with one another, it was released to moderate reviews form critics, who called the film a "subpar rom-com." Also in 2023, Keaton reteamed with Fonda, Bergen, and Steenburgen on the sequel film Book Club: The Next Chapter, which follows the quartet reuniting for a trip to Italy. Released to similar critical reception, the film performed below expectations, grossing only a third of its predecessor.

In 2024, she co-starred with Patricia Hodge and Lulu in the British body-change comedy film Arthur's Whisky about three friends that drink a secret elixir that reverses aging. The project earned positive reviews from critics, who noted that the cast felt "random" but had "pleasant chemistry." Also in the same year, Keaton wrote and published a fashion book titled Fashion First, reflecting on her style and career. She collaborated with home décor brand Hudson Grace on a major home‑decor collection, releasing over 100 pieces in August. Keaton's final appearance was in the 2024 comedy film Summer Camp about three lifelong friends who reunite at a summer‑camp reunion. Written and directed by Castille Landon and co-starring Kathy Bates and Alfre Woodard, the film received largely negative reviews from critics. In November 2024, Keaton released her first-ever solo single, the Christmas song "First Christmas", written by Carole Bayer Sager and Jonas Myrin, through Duva Music.

== Acting style and legacy ==
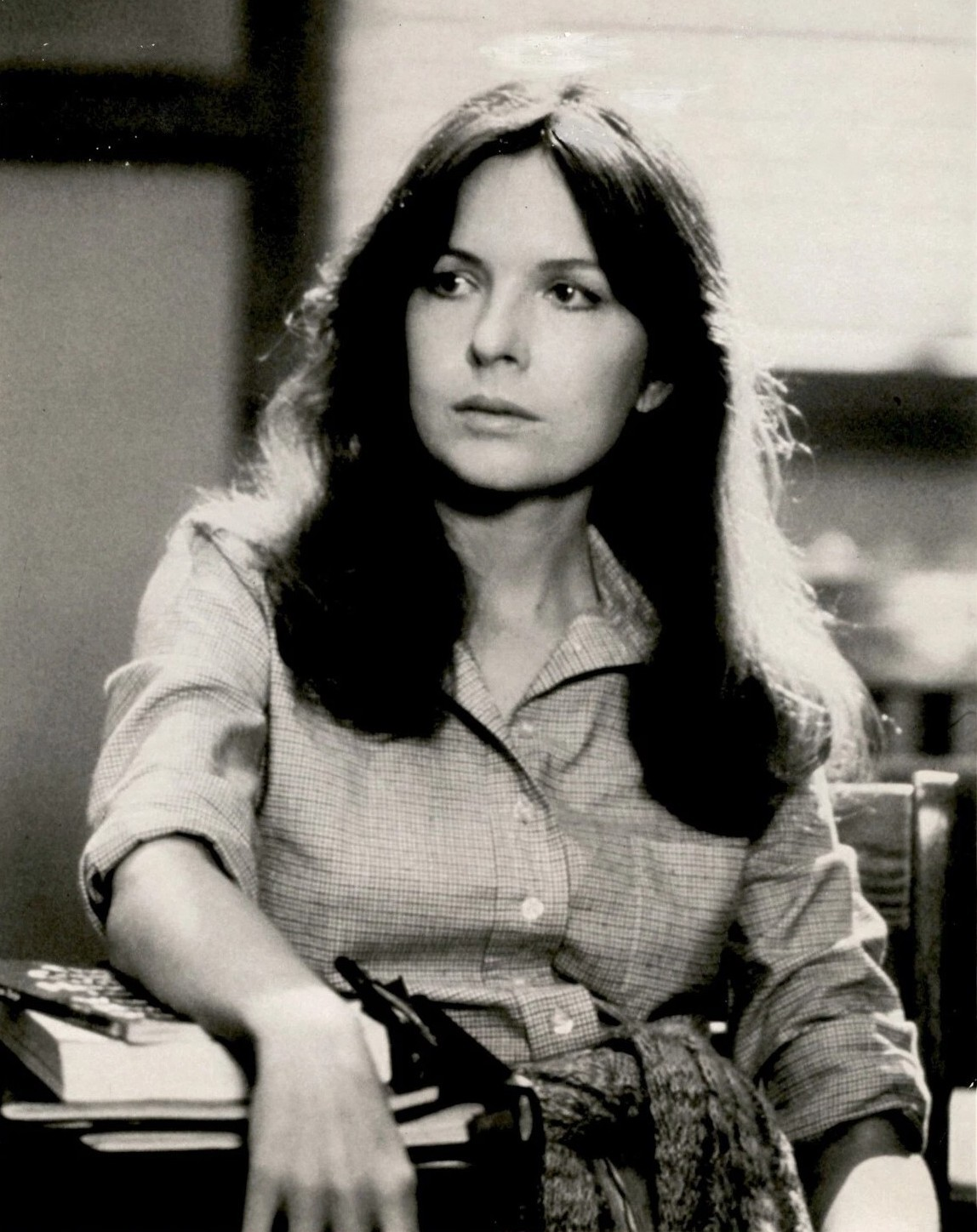
Keaton in 1977

Keaton has been said to be "one of the great American actresses from the heyday of the 1970s", a style icon and a "treasure" with a personal and professional style that is "difficult to explicate and impossible to duplicate." Many critics have pointed to her versatility in starring in both light comedies and acclaimed dramas. The New York Times described Keaton as "remarkably skilled" at portraying Woody Allen's "darling flustered muse" in his comedies, as well as "shy, self-conscious women overcome by the power of their own awakened eroticism" in dramatic films like Looking for Mr. Goodbar, Reds, Shoot the Moon and Mrs. Soffel. It also noted Keaton's ability to consistently reinvent and challenge herself on screen, having transitioned from "Allen's ditzy foil" to a "gifted and erotically nuanced character actress" and later "an appealing maternal figure ... a woman's woman with a sexy edge."

Literary critic Daphne Merkin argued that Keaton remained more popular with audiences than her contemporaries because of her "friendly accessibility" and "charmingly self-effacing" persona, calling Keaton's most "steadfastly glamorous" asset her "megawatt personality, bursting out of her like an uncontrollable force of nature, a geyser of quirkily entertaining traits that fall on the air and lend everything around her a momentary sparkle." In New York magazine, Peter Rainer wrote, "In her Annie Hall days, [Keaton] was famed for her thrown-together fashion sense, and her approach to acting is, in the best way, thrown-together, too. Audiences love her because they identify with the women she plays, who are never all of a piece. Nobody can be grave and goofy all at once like Diane Keaton. In these fractious times, it's the perfect combo for a modern heroine." Famously self-deprecating, Keaton was noted for her "wry sense of humor" and "eccentric gender-bending style".

Analyzing her on-screen persona, Deborah C. Mitchell wrote that Keaton often played "a complex, modern American woman, a paradox of self-doubt and assurance", which became her trademark. Mitchell suggests that Keaton made Annie Hall a "critical juncture for women in American culture. In this ism-infected age, Keaton became not just a star but an icon. Annie Hall, and with her Diane Keaton, presented all of the uncertainty and ambivalence of the new breed of women." Likewise, Bruce Weber felt Keaton's eccentricity — "an amalgam of caginess and insecurity" and a "note of comic desperation... her round-cheeked Annie Hall dewiness"—was her gift as a screen comedian. Keaton's Annie Hall is often cited among the greatest Oscar-winning performances in history: Entertainment Weekly ranked it 7th on its "25 greatest Best Actress Winners" list, praising her "loopy mannerisms, jazz-club serenades, and endlessly imitated fashion sense." After seeing her performance in Looking for Mr. Goodbar, Andrew Sarris remarked, "Keaton is clearly the most dynamic woman star in pictures. And any actress who can bring wit and humor to sex in an American movie has to be blessed with the most winning magic."

When asked what made Keaton funny, Allen said: "My opinion is that with the exception of Judy Holliday, she's the finest screen comedienne we've ever seen. It's in her intonation; you can't quantify it easily. When Groucho Marx or W. C. Fields or Holliday would say something, it's in the ring of their voices, and she has that. It's never line comedy with her. It's all character comedy." Charles Shyer, who directed her in Baby Boom, said Keaton was "in the mold of the iconic comedic actresses Carole Lombard, Irene Dunne and Rosalind Russell." In 2017, Keaton was chosen by the board of directors of the American Film Institute to receive the AFI Life Achievement Award, which Woody Allen presented to her.

== Personal life ==
=== Relationships and family ===
Keaton was romantically involved with several high-profile entertainment-industry personalities, starting with Woody Allen when she played a role in the 1969 Broadway production of Play It Again, Sam, which he had written. Their relationship turned romantic following a dinner after a late-night rehearsal. Her sense of humor particularly attracted him. They briefly lived together during the production, but by the time the film came out, in 1972, their living arrangement had become more informal. They worked together on eight films between 1971 and 1993, and Keaton said that Allen remained one of her closest friends. In 2017, Keaton stated that she visited Allen and his wife whenever she was in New York and said of Allen: "He is so hilarious and I just adored him, I really did."

Keaton was also in a relationship with her Godfather trilogy co-star Al Pacino. Their on-again, off-again relationship ended after the filming of The Godfather Part III. In 2017, Keaton said: "I was mad for him. Charming, hilarious, a nonstop talker. There was an aspect of him that was like a lost orphan, like this kind of crazy idiot savant. And oh, gorgeous!" Following her death in 2025, Pacino said: "Diane was my partner, my friend, someone who brought me happiness and on more than one occasion influenced the direction of my life. Though over thirty years has passed since we were together, the memories remain vivid, and with her passing, they have returned with a force that is both painful and moving... I will always remember her. She could fly—and in my heart, she always will."

Keaton was already dating Warren Beatty in 1979 when they co-starred in the film Reds (1981). Keaton said of him: "He is just a brilliant character. So complex and charming." Beatty was a regular subject of tabloid and other media coverage, and Keaton became included, much to her bewilderment. In 1985, Vanity Fair called her "the most reclusive star since Garbo". This relationship ended shortly after Reds wrapped. Troubles with the production are thought to have strained the relationship, including numerous financial and scheduling problems. Keaton remained friends with Beatty.

In her fifties, she adopted two children—a daughter in 1996 and a son in 2001. Later, she said, "Motherhood has completely changed me. It's just about like the most completely humbling experience that I've ever had."

Keaton never married, and referenced her mother's experiences as a wife as one of the key factors in that decision. In 2021, Keaton said that she felt her mother "chose family over her dreams. ... I think that she is the reason why I didn’t get married. I didn’t want to give up my independence."

=== Religious beliefs ===
Keaton said she produced her 1987 documentary Heaven because "I was always pretty religious as a kid... I was primarily interested in religion because I wanted to go to heaven." As she grew older, Keaton became agnostic.

=== Other activities ===
Keaton was a vegetarian from around 1995 on. She continued to pursue photography. In 1987, she told Vanity Fair, "I have amassed a huge library of images—kissing scenes from movies, pictures I like. Visual things are really key for me." She published several collections of her photographs and served as an editor of collections of vintage photography. Works she edited include a book of photographs by paparazzo Ron Galella, an anthology of reproductions of clown paintings, and a collection of photos of California's Spanish-Colonial-style houses.

Keaton served as a producer on films and television series. She produced the Fox series Pasadena, which was canceled after airing only four episodes in 2001 but completed its run on cable in 2005. In 2003, she produced the Gus Van Sant drama Elephant, about a school shooting. Of why she produced the film, she said, "It really makes me think about my responsibilities as an adult to try and understand what's going on with young people." From 2005, Keaton was a contributing blogger at The Huffington Post. From 2006, she was the face of L'Oréal. In 2007, she received the Film Society of Lincoln Center's Gala Tribute. She opposed plastic surgery. She told More magazine in 2004, "I'm stuck in this idea that I need to be authentic ... My face needs to look the way I feel."

Keaton was active in campaigns with the Los Angeles Conservancy to save and restore historic buildings, particularly in the Los Angeles area. Among the buildings she was active in restoring is the Ennis House in the Hollywood Hills, designed by Frank Lloyd Wright. Keaton was also active in the failed campaign to save the Ambassador Hotel in Los Angeles (a hotel featured in Reservations), where Robert F. Kennedy was assassinated. She was an enthusiast of Spanish Colonial Revival architecture. Keaton was a real estate developer. She resold several mansions in Southern California after renovating and redesigning them. One of her clients was Madonna, who purchased a $6.5 million Beverly Hills mansion from Keaton in 2003.

Keaton wrote her first memoir, Then Again, for Random House in November 2011. Much of it relied on her mother's private journals, which included the line "Diane...is a mystery... At times, she's so basic, at others so wise, it frightens me." In 2012, Keaton's audiobook recording of Joan Didion's Slouching Towards Bethlehem was released on Audible.com. Her performance was nominated for a 2013 Audie Award in the Short Stories/Collections category.

== Death and tributes ==
Keaton's health had declined significantly in the months leading up to her death, though she remained private about her condition. She died at Saint John's Health Center in Santa Monica, California, on October 11, 2025, at the age of 79 after a period of failing health. She was cremated a few days later. No autopsy was performed, but her death certificate listed bacterial pneumonia as the cause of death, with no other significant conditions noted as contributing factors. She had the condition in the days prior to being taken to the hospital on the morning of October 11.

Friend and frequent collaborator filmmaker Woody Allen wrote a remembrance of Keaton in The Free Press describing her as "unlike anyone the planet has experienced or is likely to ever see again". Director Nancy Meyers wrote that "we have lost a giant. A brilliant actress who time and again laid herself bare to tell our stories". Numerous other figures from the film and entertainment industry, some of whom were former co-stars or collaborators, paid tribute to Keaton, including Francis Ford Coppola, Viola Davis, Robert De Niro, Leonardo DiCaprio, Jane Fonda, Sarah Paulson, Goldie Hawn, Kate Hudson, Steve Martin, Bette Midler, Mandy Moore, Al Pacino, Sarah Jessica Parker, Natalie Portman, Keanu Reeves, Rachel McAdams, and Reese Witherspoon.

== Acting and directing credits ==
=== Film ===
Year	Title	Role	Notes	Ref
1970	Lovers and Other Strangers	Joan Vecchio	Film debut	
1971	Men of Crisis: The Harvey Wallinger Story	Renata Wallinger	Mockumentary short film	
1972	The Godfather	Kay Adams Corleone		
1972	Play It Again, Sam	Linda Christie		
1973	Sleeper	Luna Schlosser		
1974	The Godfather Part II	Kay Adams Corleone		
1975	Love and Death	Sonja		
1976	I Will, I Will... for Now	Katie Bingham		
1976	Harry and Walter Go to New York	Lissa Chestnut		
1977	Annie Hall	Annie Hall		
1977	Looking for Mr. Goodbar	Theresa Dunn		
1978	Interiors	Renata		
1979	Manhattan	Mary Wilkie		
1981	The Wizard of Malta	Narrator	Short film	
1981	Reds	Louise Bryant		
1982	What Does Dorrie Want?	—N/a	Short film; director only	
1982	Shoot the Moon	Faith Dunlap		
1984	The Little Drummer Girl	Charlie		
1984	Mrs. Soffel	Kate Soffel		
1986	Crimes of the Heart	Lenny Magrath		
1987	Radio Days	New Years Singer	Cameo	
1987	Baby Boom	J.C. Wiatt		
1987	Heaven	Interviewer	Documentary; also director and writer	
1988	The Good Mother	Anna Dunlap		
1990	The Lemon Sisters	Eloise Hamer	Also co-producer	
1990	The Godfather Part III	Kay Adams		
1991	Father of the Bride	Nina Banks		
1993	Manhattan Murder Mystery	Carol Lipton		
1993	Look Who's Talking Now!	Daphne	Voice	
1995	Unstrung Heroes	—N/a	Director only	
1995	Father of the Bride Part II	Nina Banks		
1996	The First Wives Club	Annie Paradis		
1996	Marvin's Room	Bessie Wakefield		
1997	The Only Thrill	Carol Fitzsimmons		
1999	The Other Sister	Elizabeth Tate		
2000	Hanging Up	Georgia Mozell	Also director	
2001	Town & Country	Ellie Stoddard		
2002	Plan B	Fran Varecchio		
2003	Elephant	—N/a	Executive producer only	
2003	Something's Gotta Give	Erica Barry		
2005	Terminal Impact	Narrator		
2005	Ellie Parker	—N/a	Special Thanks only	
2005	The Family Stone	Sybil Stone		
2007	Because I Said So	Daphne Wilder		
2007	Mama's Boy	Jan Mannus		
2008	Mad Money	Bridget Cardigan		
2008	Smother	Marilyn Cooper		
2010	Morning Glory	Colleen Peck		
2012	Darling Companion	Beth Winter		
2013	The Big Wedding	Ellie Griffin		
2014	And So it Goes	Leah		
2014	5 Flights Up	Ruth Carver		
2015	Love the Coopers	Charlotte Cooper		
2016	Finding Dory	Jenny	Voice	
2017	Hampstead	Emily Walters		
2018	Book Club	Diane		
2019	Poms	Martha		
2020	Father of the Bride, Part 3(ish)	Nina Banks	YouTube and Facebook short film	
2020	Love, Weddings & Other Disasters	Sara		
2022	Mack & Rita	Rita		
2023	Maybe I Do	Grace		
2023	Book Club: The Next Chapter	Diane		
2024	Arthur's Whisky	Linda		
2024	Summer Camp	Nora		

=== Television ===
Year	Title	Role	Notes	Ref
1970	Love, American Style	Louise	Segment: "Love and Pen Pals"	
1970	Night Gallery	Nurse Frances Nevins	Segment: "Room with a View"	
1971	The F.B.I.	Diane Britt	Episode: "Death Watch"	
1971	Mannix	Cindy Conrad	Episode: "The Color of Murder"	
1977	The Godfather Saga	Kay Adams Corleone	4 episodes	
1991	Wildflower	—N/a	Television film; director only	
1991	Twin Peaks	—N/a	Director only; Episode: "Slaves and Masters"	
1992	Running Mates	Aggie Snow	Television film	
1994	Amelia Earhart: The Final Flight	Amelia Earhart	Television film	
1997	Northern Lights	Roberta Blumstein	Television film	
2001	Sister Mary Explains It All	Sister Mary Ignatius	Television film	
2002	Crossed Over	Beverly Lowry	Television film	
2003	On Thin Ice	Patsy McCartle	Television film	
2006	Surrender, Dorothy	Natalie Swerdlow	Television film	
2011	Tilda	Tilda Watski	Pilot, not aired	
2016	The Young Pope	Sister Mary Ignatius	10 episodes	
2017	AFI Life Achievement Award: A Tribute to Diane Keaton	Herself	Television Special	
2019–2022	Green Eggs and Ham	Michellee Weebie-Am-I	Voice; 20 episodes	

=== Theater ===
Year	Title	Role	Venue	Ref
1968	Hair	Various / Performer	Biltmore Theatre, Broadway	
1969	Play It Again, Sam	Linda Christie	Broadhurst Theatre, Broadway	
1976	Primary English Class	Debbie Wastba	Circle in the Square Theatre, Off-Broadway	

=== Music videos ===
Year	Title	Role	Artist	Ref
1987	"Heaven Is a Place on Earth"	Director	Belinda Carlisle	
1988	"I Get Weak"	Director	Belinda Carlisle	
1989	"Think Too Hard"	Director	Syd Straw	
2021	"Ghost"	Bieber's grandmother	Justin Bieber	

== Awards and honors ==
Keaton received various awards including an Academy Award, and a Golden Globe Award for her performance in Woody Allen's Annie Hall (1977). She received three more Academy Award nominations, for Reds (1981), Marvin's Room (1996), and Something's Gotta Give (2003). Keaton received a Primetime Emmy Award nomination for Amelia Earhart: The Final Flight (1994) and a Daytime Emmy Award nomination for CBS Schoolbreak Special in 1990. Keaton received 9 Golden Globe Award nominations, winning for Annie Hall (1977) and Something's Gotta Give (2003). She was nominated for four Screen Actors Guild Awards for her work in film and television.

Over the years Keaton received various honors for her work as an actress and fashion icon. In 1991, she received the Hasty Pudding Woman of the Year award from Harvard's Hasty Pudding Theatricals, which is given to performers who give a lasting and impressive contribution to the world of entertainment. In 1995, she was honored by the New York Women in Film & Television association along with Angela Bassett, Cokie Roberts, Gena Rowlands and Thelma Schoonmaker. In 1996, she won the Golden Apple Award as the Female Star of the Year, sharing it with her First Wives Club co-stars Goldie Hawn and Bette Midler. She also received the 1997 Crystal Award at the Women in Film Crystal + Lucy Awards in 1997, and the Elle Women in Hollywood Awards the Icon Award in 1998 along with Sigourney Weaver, Lucy Fisher and Gillian Armstrong.

Keaton won the 2004 AFI Star Award during the US Comedy Arts Festival. In 2005, she received a Lifetime Achievement award from the Hollywood Film Awards. Keaton was honored with the Film Society of Lincoln Center Gala Tribute in 2007. In 2014, she received the Golden Icon Award at the Zurich Film Festival. In 2017, Keaton was honored by the American Film Institute and was given a Lifetime Achievement Award, which was presented to her by her close friend and frequent collaborator Woody Allen. Steve Martin, Martin Short, Meryl Streep, Reese Witherspoon, Emma Stone, Rachel McAdams, Morgan Freeman, Al Pacino, and other paid tribute to her. In 2018, she received a Special David at the David di Donatello Awards.

== Books written ==
As writer

- Then Again, New York: Random House, 2011, ISBN 9781400068784
- Let's Just Say It Wasn't Pretty, New York: Random House, 2014, ISBN 9780812994261
- The House That Pinterest Built, New York: Rizzoli, 2017
- Brother & Sister, New York: Random House, 2020 ISBN 9780451494504
- SAVED: My Picture World, New York: Rizzoli, 2022, ISBN 9780847871285
- Fashion First, with Ralph Lauren, Rizzoli 2024 ISBN 9780847827817

As editor

- Still Life (with Marvin Heiferman), New York: Callaway, 1983, ISBN 0935112162
- Mr. Salesman, Santa Fe: Twin Palms Publishers, 1993, ISBN 0944092268
- Local News (with Marvin Heiferman), New York: D.A.P./Distributed Art Publishers, Inc., 1999, ISBN 1891024132
- Clown Paintings, New York: powerHouse Books, 2002, ISBN 1576871487
- California Romantica, New York: Rizzoli, 2007, ISBN 0847829758
- House, New York: Rizzoli, 2012, ISBN 9780847835638

== See also ==
- List of American film actresses
- List of actors with Academy Award nominations
- List of actors with more than one Academy Award nomination in the acting categories
- List of Golden Globe winners
