= Something's Gotta Give (film) =

2003 film by Nancy Meyers

- Theatrical release poster
- Directed by: Nancy Meyers
- Written by: Nancy Meyers
- Produced by: Nancy Meyers; Bruce A. Block
- Starring: Jack Nicholson; Diane Keaton; Keanu Reeves; Frances McDormand; Amanda Peet; Jon Favreau
- Cinematography: Michael Ballhaus
- Edited by: Joe Hutshing
- Music by: Hans Zimmer
- Production companies: Columbia Pictures; Warner Bros. Pictures; Waverly Films
- Distributed by: Sony Pictures Releasing (United States and Canada); Warner Bros. Pictures (International)
- Release date: December 12, 2003 (United States)
- Running time: 128 minutes
- Country: United States
- Language: English
- Budget: $80 million
- Box office: $266.7 million

Something's Gotta Give is a 2003 American romantic comedy drama film written, produced, and directed by Nancy Meyers. It stars Jack Nicholson and Diane Keaton as professionals who find love for each other in later life, despite being complete opposites. Keanu Reeves and Amanda Peet co-star, with Frances McDormand and Jon Favreau playing key supporting roles.

Something's Gotta Give was released on December 12, 2003, by Sony Pictures Releasing in the United States and Canada and by Warner Bros. Pictures in international markets. The film received positive reviews from critics, with praise directed towards Keaton and Nicholson's performances. The film emerged as a major commercial success at the box-office, grossing $266 million worldwide against a production budget of $80 million.

For her performance, Keaton received nominations for the Academy Award for Best Actress, the Critics' Choice Movie Award for Best Actress and the Screen Actors Guild Award for Outstanding Performance by a Female Actor in a Leading Role. At the 61st Golden Globe Awards, Keaton won Best Actress in a Motion Picture – Musical or Comedy, while Nicholson received a nomination for Best Actor in a Motion Picture – Musical or Comedy.

== Plot ==
Harry Sanborn is a wealthy New York City record company owner who only dates women under 30, including his latest girlfriend, Marin Klein. The two drive to her mother's Hamptons beach house, expecting to be alone. However, Marin's mother, playwright Erica Barry, and aunt Zoe arrive unexpectedly.

After an awkward dinner, the night turns disastrous when—during foreplay with Marin—Harry has a heart attack and is rushed to a hospital. The attending doctor, Julian Mercer, tells Harry to stay nearby for a few days, so he reluctantly stays with Erica. Complicating matters, Julian is a fan of Erica's work and clearly attracted to her.

Erica and Harry's personalities clash and create awkward living arrangements at first, but they soon find charming qualities in each other and begin to form a connection. Harry's relationship with Marin and Erica's budding relationship with Julian become obstacles to their growing attraction.

Marin tells her mother she will break up with Harry, but he ends things first. Harry and Erica spend more time together and eventually fall into an affair. Julian tells him he has improved enough to return to the city. Harry and Erica share an awkward goodbye, as despite their strong feelings, he is clearly hesitant to enter into a relationship.

Marin receives news that her father and Erica's ex-husband, Dave Klein, is getting remarried to a doctor only two years older than her. Though Erica is unaffected by the news, Marin is devastated so pressures her mother into accompanying her to a dinner.

At dinner, Erica sees Harry at another table with a much younger woman. An argument follows and Erica confesses that she is in love with him. When he does not seem to reciprocate, she ends things between them and leaves. Harry has what he believes is another heart attack, but in the emergency room he is told it was a panic attack.

Devastated, Erica returns home where she cries almost nonstop for several weeks. She pours her heartbreak into a new play about a woman who falls in love with her daughter's boyfriend, giving it the title "A Woman to Love," a phrase Harry had used to describe her. He hears about the play and rushes to the theater where it is being rehearsed.

Despite her denials, it is obvious that Erica has used the most personal details of their affair in the play. When Harry tells her he still cares about her, she rebuffs him. After learning his character dies in the play, he suffers another fake heart attack. At the hospital, he is told he needs to de-stress, so he relocates temporarily to the Bahamas.

Six months later, Erica's play is a huge success. Harry pays Marin a visit to apologize for any past disrespect, and discovers she is happily married and pregnant. Marin tells him Erica is in Paris celebrating her birthday. Harry flies there and surprises her at her favorite restaurant, where he tells her he has been reaching out to all the young women he had affairs with in an attempt to atone for his heartless behavior. Julian, whom Erica is now dating, appears.

Harry, Erica and Julian have dinner together, and part amicably outside the restaurant. While Harry gazes in heartache over the river Seine, Erica arrives. She tells him Julian realized she still loves Harry and has decided to step aside so they could be together. Harry tells Erica that at age 63, he is in love for the first time in his life, and they embrace.

A year later at a restaurant, the now-married Erica and Harry are out with Marin, her husband Danny and their new baby daughter, celebrating life as a loving family.

== Cast ==
- Jack Nicholson as Harry Sanborn, 63, a self-satisfied playboy and socialite who owns ten companies, including a magazine and the second-largest hip hop label in the world. He only dates women under 30.
- Diane Keaton as Erica Barry, 56, a successful, divorced Broadway playwright who lives part of the time in an upscale Hamptons beach house. Having survived her divorce without huge bitterness, she lives a quiet life of professional fulfillment and romantic disappointment.
- Keanu Reeves as Julian Mercer, Harry's 36-year-old doctor. He is also a huge fan of Erica's, with whom he develops a relationship.
- Amanda Peet as Marin Klein, Erica's daughter, a 29-year-old auctioneer working for Christie's.
- Frances McDormand as Zoe, Erica's sister. She is a professor of lesbian feminist women's studies at Columbia University.
- Jon Favreau as Leo, Harry's personal assistant.
- Paul Michael Glaser as Dave Klein, Marin's father and Erica's ex-husband. He directs Erica's plays.
- Rachel Ticotin as Dr. Martinez, the ER doctor.
- KaDee Strickland as Kristen, Dave's fiancée. She is an ENT doctor and is two years older than Marin.
- Peter Spears as Danny Benjamin, Marin's husband (shown near the end of the film).

== Soundtrack ==
Something's Gotta Give: Music from the Motion Picture

Soundtrack album by Various Artists
- Released: February 23, 2004
- Length: 42:36
- Labels: Columbia; Sony Music Soundtrax

The soundtrack was released on February 23, 2004, by Columbia Records. As of 2004, the soundtrack has sold 172,000 copies in the United States.

=== Track listing ===
1. "La Vie en Rose" – Louis Armstrong
2. "I've Got a Crush on You" – Steve Tyrell
3. "I Only Have Eyes for You" – The Flamingos
4. "Let's Get It On" - Marvin Gaye
5. "So Nice (Summer Samba)" – Astrud Gilberto
6. "Remember Me" – Heitor Pereira
7. "Samba de mon cœur qui bat" – Coralie Clément
8. "Que reste-t-il de nos amours" – Charles Trenet
9. "Assedic" – Les Escrocs
10. "Je Cherche un Homme" – Eartha Kitt
11. "C'est si bon" – Eartha Kitt
12. "Brazil" – Django Reinhardt
13. "Sweet Lorraine" – Stephane Grappelli, Ilsa Eckinger, Ike Isaacs and Diz Disley
14. "Love Makes the World Go 'Round" – Deon Jackson
15. "La Vie en Rose" – Jack Nicholson
16. "Sunday Morning" - Maroon 5
17. "Learn How To Fall" – Paul Simon

The film was originally scored by Alan Silvestri and orchestrated by Tony Blondal; however, creative differences led to Silvestri being replaced at the last minute by members of Remote Control Productions. As Silvestri's music was already recorded, some of it remains in the film.

== Reception ==
=== Critical response ===
On review aggregator website Rotten Tomatoes, Something's Gotta Give holds an approval rating of 72% based on 172 reviews, with an average rating of 6.60/10. The site's critics consensus reads: "Though it occasionally stumbles into sitcom territory, Something's Gotta Give is mostly a smart, funny romantic comedy, with sharp performances from Jack Nicholson, Diane Keaton and Keanu Reeves." On Metacritic the film has a weighted average score of 66 out of 100, based on 40 critics, indicating "generally favorable reviews". Audiences surveyed by CinemaScore gave the film a grade "A−" on scale of A to F.

Mick LaSalle, writing for the San Francisco Chronicle, felt the performances of the film's stars, Diane Keaton and Jack Nicholson, were among their best, and that Nicholson's acting, as his role covered a wider range of emotions, was the more complex. The reviewer praised the film for being a romantic comedy for adults:

The adult romance is a dying genre in our era, but movies as wise and fun as Something's Gotta Give have always been rare. It's a comedy with hilarious moments, and yet with an essential seriousness at its core: Two people in the autumn of life find love.

Roger Ebert describes the film's dialogue as "smart". Although noting that Keanu Reeves's role "seems like nothing more than a walking plot complication", he praises the performances of Keaton and Nicholson: "A movie like this depends crucially on its stars. To complain that Nicholson is playing "himself" – or that Keaton is also playing a character very much like her public persona – is missing the point. Part of the appeal depends on the movie's teasing confusion of reality and fiction."

== Accolades ==
Awards
Award	Category	Recipients	Result
Academy Awards	Best Actress	Diane Keaton	Nominated
Art Directors Guild Awards	Excellence in Production Design: Feature Film – Contemporary Film	Jon Hutman (production designer), John Warnke (art director), Steven Graham (art director), Ashley Burnham (assistant art director), Hinju Kim (assistant art director)	Nominated
Artios Awards	Best Casting for Feature Film, Comedy	Jane Jenkins, Janet Hirshenson	Nominated
Critics' Choice Movie Awards	Best Actress	Diane Keaton	Nominated
Golden Globe Awards	Best Actor in a Motion Picture – Musical or Comedy	Jack Nicholson	Nominated
Golden Globe Awards	Best Actress in a Motion Picture – Musical or Comedy	Diane Keaton	Won
Golden Reel Awards	Best Sound Editing in a Feature: Music, Feature Film	Andrew Silver (music editor/scoring editor), Kenneth Karman (music editor), Lee Scott (music editor)	Nominated
National Board of Review of Motion Pictures Awards	Best Actress	Diane Keaton	Won
Phoenix Film Critics Society Awards	Best Actress	Diane Keaton	Nominated
Satellite Awards	Best Actress – Motion Picture	Diane Keaton	Won
Screen Actors Guild Awards	Outstanding Performance by a Female Actor in a Leading Role	Diane Keaton	Nominated
Washington D.C. Area Film Critics Association Awards	Best Actress	Diane Keaton	Nominated

The film is recognized by American Film Institute in these lists:

- 2008: AFI's 10 Top 10:
  - Nominated – Romantic Comedy Film

== Home media ==
Something's Gotta Give was released on VHS on June 8, 2004, DVD on March 30, 2004, by Columbia TriStar Home Entertainment and Warner Home Video, and Blu-ray by Sony Pictures on April 26, 2026.
