= Amelia Earhart: The Final Flight =

1994 American biographical film

- Print advertisement
- Genre: Biography
- Based on: Amelia Earhart: A Biography by Doris L. Rich
- Written by: Anna Sandor
- Directed by: Yves Simoneau
- Starring: Diane Keaton; Rutger Hauer; Bruce Dern
- Music by: George S. Clinton
- Country of origin: United States
- Original language: English

Production
- Executive producer: Randy Robinson
- Producer: Cary Brokaw
- Cinematography: Lauro Escorel
- Editor: Michael D. Ornstein
- Running time: 95 minutes
- Production companies: Avenue Pictures Productions; Turner Pictures

Original release
- Network: TNT
- Release: June 12, 1994

Amelia Earhart: The Final Flight (also known as Amelia Earhart) is a 1994 American biographical television film directed by Yves Simoneau, written by Anna Sandor, and starring Diane Keaton, Rutger Hauer and Bruce Dern. The film is based on the 1987 book Amelia Earhart: A Biography by Doris L. Rich, and depicts events in the life of Amelia Earhart, focusing on her final flight and disappearance in 1937, with her exploits in aviation and her marriage to publisher George P. Putnam being revealed in flashbacks. It aired on TNT on June 12, 1994.

== Plot ==
In 1928, Amelia Earhart gains fame by undertaking a transatlantic flight, albeit as a passenger. Her marriage to media tycoon George Palmer Putnam and a series of record-breaking flights propel her to international fame as a long-distance flyer. With help from a close friend and adviser, Paul Mantz, Earhart and her navigator, the hard-drinking Fred Noonan, undertake her longest flight ever: a round-the-world attempt in 1937. The airplane disappears, and a massive search effort is unsuccessful, but solidifies Earhart as an aviation icon.

== Cast ==
- Diane Keaton as Amelia Earhart
- Rutger Hauer as Fred Noonan
- Bruce Dern as George Putnam
- Paul Guilfoyle as Paul Mantz
- David Carpenter as Harry Manning
- Denis Arndt as Joseph Laughlin
- Diana Bellamy as Mrs. Atkinson
- Heather Lauren Olson as Teenage Girl fan
- Don Bloomfield as Sid Smith
- Nancy Lenehan as Radio Show Hostess
- Newell Alexander as Radio Show Sound Effects operator
- Simon Templeman as Harry Balfour
- Warren Munson as President Elliot
- Marilyn Rockafellow as Mrs. Elliot
- Hansford Rowe as Purdue male guest
- Edith Fields as Purdue female guest 1

== Production ==
Principal photography began on October 18, 1993, with studio work as well as location shooting in both California and Quebec. Although a Beech D18 was used, it was an adequate substitute for Earhart's famed Lockheed Model 10 Electra used in the circumnavigational flight of the globe in 1937. Well-known race pilot Steve Hinton, president of the Planes of Fame Air Museum and owner of Fighter Rebuilders, flew for the film. The cockpit section of the Beech aircraft used (actually the US Navy variant, an SNB-5) is now on display at Lyon Air Museum in Orange County, California, as part of a hands-on education area.

== Reception ==
Interest in the story of Amelia Earhart, especially with the release of Amelia in 2009, led film reviewers to recall the earlier Earhart portrayals. Rosalind Russell had played "an Earhart-esque flier in 1943's Flight for Freedom" and Susan Clark starred in the 1976 film, Amelia Earhart.

Following closely the contemporary Earhart biographies that had appeared, Amelia Earhart: The Final Flight dramatized Earhart's final flight to the extent that more myth than fact comes through. Reviews of the performances in Amelia Earhart: The Final Flight were mixed, with some observers noting that the depictions were not true to the character of the historical figures that were portrayed.

Keaton's understated portrayal of Earhart resulted in nominations for a 1995 Golden Globe and a 1995 Emmy for Lead Actress in a Miniseries or Special, as well as a 1995 Screen Actors Guild Award nomination. Editor Michael D. Ornstein won the 1995 CableACE Award for Editing while the production also garnered nominations for an American Society of Cinematographers, (ASC) Award for Outstanding Achievement in Cinematography in Movies of the Week/Pilots and an Emmy nomination for Single Camera Editing in a Miniseries/Special for 1995.
