= Internal affairs =

Internal affairs may refer to:

== Government and law ==
- The domestic policy of a sovereign state
- Ministry of home affairs, a common type of government department
  - Department of Internal Affairs, New Zealand
  - Directorate for Internal Affairs (Jewish Autonomous Oblast), Russia
- Internal affairs (law enforcement), a division of a law enforcement agency which investigates cases of police misconduct
- Internal affairs doctrine, a choice of law rule in corporations law

== Arts and entertainment ==
=== Film ===
- Internal Affairs (film), a 1990 American crime thriller
- Internal Affairs, a 1988 television film starring Richard Crenna

=== Literature ===
- Internal Affair, a 2003 novel by Marie Ferrarella
- Internal Affairs, a 2009 novel by Jessica Andersen

=== Television ===
- "An Internal Affairs Affair", The Oldest Rookie episode 10 (1987)
- "Internal Affair", Forensic Files season 11, episode 17 (2006)
- "Internal Affair", Viper season 3, episode 21 (1998)
- "Internal Affairs", Aaahh!!! Real Monsters season 2, episode 2b (1997)
- "Internal Affairs", Black Tie Nights season 1, episode 12 (2004)
- "Internal Affairs", Cagney & Lacey season 2, episode 6 (1982)
- "Internal Affairs", Chicago Hope season 1, episode 19 (1995)
- "Internal Affairs", Criminal Minds season 11, episode 9 (2015)
- "Internal Affairs", CSI: Miami season 5, episode 12 (2007)
- "Internal Affairs (DR-20)", Dragnet (1967) season 3, episode 12 (1968)
- "Internal Affairs – Parolee", Dragnet (1967) season 4, episode 10 (1969)
- "Internal Affairs", Family Guy season 10, episode 23 (2012)
- "Internal Affairs", High Hopes series 6, episode 5 (2008)
- "Internal Affairs", Law & Order: Special Victims Unit season 15, episode 4 (2013)
- "Internal Affairs", Major Crimes season 3, episode 17 (2015)
- "Internal Affairs", NCIS season 5, episode 14 (2008)
- "Internal Affairs", New York Undercover season 2, episode 12 (1995)
- "Internal Affairs", On the Case with Paula Zahn season 3, episode 7 (2010)
- "Internal Affairs", Prodigal Son season 1, episode 12 (2020)
- "Internal Affairs", Sidekick season 1, episode 13a (2010)
- "Internal Affairs", Silk Stalkings season 1, episode 28 (1992)
- "Internal Affairs", Spenser: For Hire season 1, episode 12 (1985)
- "Internal Affairs", Spin City season 3, episode 16 (1999)
- "Internal Affairs", Strike Force episode 10 (1982)
- "Internal Affairs", T.U.F.F. Puppy season 1, episode 6b (2010)
- "Intern-al Affairs", Herman's Head season 2, episode 4 (1992)

=== Music ===
- Internal Affairs (Pharoahe Monch album), 1999
- Internal Affairs (The Night Flight Orchestra album), 2012

== See also ==
- Home Affairs (disambiguation)
- IA (disambiguation)
- Internal (disambiguation)
- Affair (disambiguation)
- Aapas Ki Baat (disambiguation) (transl. internal affairs in Hindi-Urdu)
- National Academy of Internal Affairs, Ukraine
