= Book Club: The Next Chapter =

2023 film by Bill Holderman and Erin Simms

- Theatrical release poster
- Directed by: Bill Holderman
- Written by: Bill Holderman; Erin Simms
- Based on: Characters by Bill Holderman; Erin Simms
- Produced by: Bill Holderman; Erin Simms
- Starring: Diane Keaton; Jane Fonda; Candice Bergen; Mary Steenburgen; Craig T. Nelson; Giancarlo Giannini; Andy García; Don Johnson
- Cinematography: Andrew Dunn
- Edited by: Doc Crotzer
- Music by: Tom Howe
- Production companies: Makeready; Fifth Season; Apartment Story
- Distributed by: Focus Features (United States); Universal Pictures (International)
- Release date: May 12, 2023
- Running time: 108 minutes
- Country: United States
- Language: English
- Budget: $20 million
- Box office: $29.1 million

Book Club: The Next Chapter is a 2023 American romantic comedy film written and directed by Bill Holderman. It serves as a sequel to Book Club (2018). The film stars Diane Keaton, Jane Fonda, Candice Bergen, Mary Steenburgen, Craig T. Nelson, Giancarlo Giannini, Andy García, and Don Johnson.

Book Club: The Next Chapter was released in the United States on May 12, 2023, by Focus Features. The film received mixed reviews from critics and has grossed $29 million worldwide.

== Plot ==
The four friends in the book club meet in person after COVID-19 forced them to switch their monthly meetings to Zoom calls. During that time, Sharon retires as a judge, Carol's husband Bruce suffers a heart attack, and Carol has to close her Italian restaurant.

Vivian, who has been confined with Arthur, reveals their engagement once the confinement is over and the club can meet again in person. Carol reminds them of a trip to Italy they did not go on years previously, so now that the travel ban is lifted, she proposes that they take a bachelorette trip to Italy culminating in the final destination in Tuscany. At first the three friends resist, but Arthur encourages Vivian to go, Sharon's cat dies, and Mitchell encourages Diane to go.

The four thoroughly enjoy their stay in Rome, sightseeing, man watching, being admired by the locals and shopping for Vivian's wedding gown. A street artist assures them a trip to Venice is a must for tourists, so they take a train. At the station, they hand over their luggage to the “porters” at the station, not realizing they are thieves.

Diane loses the urn containing her deceased husband Harry's ashes, which she has illegally brought into the country, hidden in her suitcase. Sharon calls the police chief who attends them lazy for his treatment of the theft. Carol points out that their experience is like what happened to a character in Paolo Coelho's The Alchemist, so they should treat it as part of their adventure too.

Vivian's hotel connections get them nice accommodations in Venice. In a bar, Sharon meets Ousmane, a retired philosophy professor who invites the foursome to dinner. The venue turns out to be famed Chef Gianni's cooking school, and he and Carol are blown away by the surprise of seeing each other again.

After an evening of eating, drinking and dancing, Sharon and Ousmane leave together and Carol visits Gianni's kitchen. There is a spark between Carol and Gianni, which they channel into kneading dough. Sharon and Ousmane have a passionate encounter on his boat, then are found by the same police chief she called lazy.

The foursome rent a car to drive to Tuscany, as Diane especially fears thieves on the train. On the road, Carol panics as Gianni has shared photos of their cooking session online, labeling them in his broken English. Realizing Bruce will see them as they will also go to her iPad, she frantically calls him. Her friends, giving her tough love, point out she is stifling both of them and not enjoying life.

They have a flat tire on the secondary road without a spare, forcing them to hitchhike. Diane reveals that they need to be in Tuscany in the morning as Arthur is surprising Vivian with an intimate destination wedding there. When a hunky policeman happens by, Vivian thinks he is a male stripper so tries to pull off his clothes. That lands them in the local jail. There, both Vivian and Diane get tough love and honest feedback, before Sharon goads the same prickly police chief as before into getting them to Vivian's wedding via helicopter. As Diane's urn was recovered, he lets her scatter her husband's ashes en route.

Arthur and Mitchell (his best man, and Diane's boyfriend) are waiting, and Carol is surprised by Bruce's appearance. Judge Sharon officiates the wedding. Vivian hedges about going through with the wedding, so Arthur pledges his love and asks her to not marry him. When Mitchell asks Diane to marry him, she accepts so Sharon marries them on the spot.

The four friends realize their current book, The Alchemist by Paolo Coelho, predicted their lives more than they expected it to.

== Cast ==
- Diane Keaton as Diane
- Jane Fonda as Vivian
- Candice Bergen as Sharon
- Mary Steenburgen as Carol
- Craig T. Nelson as Bruce
- Don Johnson as Arthur
- Andy García as Mitchell
- Giancarlo Giannini as the Police Chief
- Vincent Riotta as Chef Gianni
- Hugh Quarshie as Ousmane

== Production ==
In May 2022, Variety announced that a sequel to Book Club titled Book Club 2: The Next Chapter had begun production, with Keaton, Fonda, Bergen, Steenburgen, Garcia, Johnson, and Nelson reprising their roles from the first film. Production occurred over the course of two months in Italy, including 10 days in Venice.

After Paramount Pictures, the distributor of the original film, expressed disinterest in releasing the sequel, Fifth Season instead sold worldwide rights to Focus Features in a negative pickup deal worth over $20 million.

== Release ==
Book Club: The Next Chapter was released in theatres on May 12, 2023, by Focus Features. It was available for streaming exclusively on the streaming service Peacock on June 30, 2023.

== Reception ==
=== Box office ===
Book Club: The Next Chapter grossed $17.6 million in domestic box office, and $11.5 million internationally, for a worldwide total of $29.1 million in its theatrical performance.

In the United States and Canada, Book Club: The Next Chapter was released alongside Hypnotic, and was projected to gross $7–10 million from 3,507 theaters in its opening weekend. It made $2.1 million on its first day, including $550,000 from Thursday night previews. It went on to debut to $6.4 million, finishing third behind holdovers Guardians of the Galaxy Vol. 3 and The Super Mario Bros. Movie. The below-expectations opening was blamed in part on a lack of demand for a sequel to the first film, as well as older females (which made up 48% of the audience) being hesitant to return to theaters since the COVID-19 pandemic. The film made $3 million in its second weekend, finishing in fourth.

=== Critical response ===
On the review aggregator website Rotten Tomatoes, 47% of 115 critics' reviews are positive, with an average rating of 5.1/10. The website's consensus reads: "Book Club: The Next Chapter's leading quartet remains eminently watchable, but they're underserved by its corny jokes and somewhat patronizing tone." Metacritic, which uses a weighted average, assigned the film a score of 46 out of 100, based on 28 critics, indicating "mixed or average" reviews. Audiences polled by CinemaScore gave the film an average grade of "B" on an A+ to F scale (down from the first film's “A-“), while those polled by PostTrak gave it an 81% positive score, with 55% saying they would definitely recommend it.
