= Andrew Dunn (cinematographer) =

British cinematographer

- Born: Andrew William Dunn; London, England
- Occupation: Cinematographer
- Years active: 1978-present
- Organization: British Society of Cinematographers
- Spouse: Emma Dunn (m. 1996)
- Children: 2

Andrew William Dunn BSC is a British cinematographer.

== Early life and career ==
Dunn was born in London, England.

He grew up around cinema, as his father worked for MGM Studios.

Dunn started making films in his early teens, and then joined the BBC whilst studying film at the University of Westminster (formerly London Polytechnic).

== Filmography ==
=== Film ===
Year	Title	Director
1989	Strapless	David Hare
1989	Chattahoochee	Mick Jackson
1991	L.A. Story	Mick Jackson
1992	Blame It on the Bellboy	Mark Herman
1992	The Bodyguard	Mick Jackson
1993	The Hawk	David Hayman
1994	Clean Slate	Mick Jackson
1994	A Simple Twist of Fate	Gillies MacKinnon
1994	The Madness of King George	Nicholas Hytner
1995	The Grotesque	John-Paul Davidson
1996	The Crucible	Nicholas Hytner
1997	Addicted to Love	Griffin Dunne
1998	Hush	Jonathan Darby
1998	Ever After	Andy Tennant
1998	Practical Magic	Griffin Dunne
2000	Ordinary Decent Criminal	Thaddeus O'Sullivan
2000	Liam	Stephen Frears
2001	Monkeybone	Henry Selick
2001	Gosford Park	Robert Altman
2002	The Count of Monte Cristo	Kevin Reynolds
2002	Sweet Home Alabama	Andy Tennant
2003	What a Girl Wants	Dennie Gordon
2003	The Company	Robert Altman
2004	Stage Beauty	Richard Eyre
2004	Piccadilly Jim	John McKay
2005	Hitch	Andy Tennant
2005	Mrs Henderson Presents	Stephen Frears
2006	The History Boys	Nicholas Hytner
2006	Miss Potter	Chris Noonan
2007	Hot Rod	Akiva Schaffer
2008	Good	Vicente Amorim
2009	Precious	Lee Daniels
2010	Extraordinary Measures	Tom Vaughan
2010	Life as We Know It	Greg Berlanti
2011	Crazy, Stupid, Love	Glenn Ficarra; John Requa
2012	The Perks of Being a Wallflower	Stephen Chbosky
2013	Summer in February	Christopher Menaul
2013	The Butler	Lee Daniels
2013	Hello Carter	Anthony Wilcox
2014	Endless Love	Shana Feste
2014	Effie Gray	Richard Laxton
2015	Man Up	Ben Palmer
2015	The Lady in the Van	Nicholas Hytner
2015	Ithaca	Meg Ryan
2016	Bridget Jones's Baby	Sharon Maguire
2016	Keeping Up with the Joneses	Greg Mottola
2017	The Children Act	Richard Eyre
2018	Book Club	Bill Holderman
2020	The Secret: Dare to Dream	Andy Tennant
2021	Flora & Ulysses	Lena Khan
2021	The United States vs. Billie Holiday	Lee Daniels
2022	Downton Abbey: A New Era	Simon Curtis
2023	Love Again	James C. Strouse
2023	Book Club: The Next Chapter	Bill Holderman
2024	Killer Heat	Philippe Lacôte
2027	The Housekeeper	Richard Eyre

Documentary film

Year	Title	Director
2022	Ghislaine Maxwell: Filthy Rich	Maiken Baird; Lisa Bryant

=== Television ===
TV movies

Year	Title	Director	Notes
1981	Andrina	Bill Forsyth	
1984	Threads	Mick Jackson	With Paul Morris
1987	Two of Us	Roger Tonge	
1988	Tumbledown	Richard Eyre	
1988	Across the Lake	Tony Maylam	
1994	And Then There Was One	David Jones	
1994	Is There Life Out There?	David Jones	
1997	Food for Ravens	Trevor Griffiths	
2017	My Country	Rufus Norris	

TV series

Year	Title	Director	Notes
1984	A Winter Harvest	Colin Godman	3 episodes
1987–1995	Screen Two		5 episodes
1988	Scene	Roger Tonge	Segment "Two of Us"
1993	Great Performances	Richard Eyre	Episode "Suddenly, Last Summer"
2015	Empire	Lee Daniels	Episode "Pilot"
2017–2019	The Zoo		22 episodes

Miniseries

Year	Title	Director	Notes
1985	Edge of Darkness	Martin Campbell	
1986	The Monocled Mutineer	Jim O'Brien	With Robert Southam and Jeremy Humphries
1987	My Family and Other Animals	Peter Barber-Fleming	
1989	Blackeyes	Dennis Potter	

=== Music video ===
Year	Title	Artist	Director
1992	"I Will Always Love You"	Whitney Houston	Nick Brandt
1993	"I Have Nothing"	Whitney Houston	S.A. Baron
1993	"Run to You"	Whitney Houston	Mitchell Sinoway
1994	"Queen of the Night"	Whitney Houston	Mick Jackson

== Awards and nominations ==
Year	Award	Category	Title	Result
1984	BAFTA Awards	Best Film Cameraman	Threads	Won
1985	BAFTA Awards	Best Film Cameraman	Edge of Darkness	Won
1986	BAFTA Awards	Best Film Cameraman	The Monocled Mutineer	Nominated
1988	BAFTA Awards	Best Film Cameraman	Tumbledown	Won
1994	BAFTA Awards	Best Cinematography	The Madness of King George	Won
1994	British Society of Cinematographers	Best Cinematography	The Madness of King George	Won
2001	British Society of Cinematographers	Best Cinematography	Gosford Park	Nominated
2005	British Society of Cinematographers	Best Cinematography	Mrs Henderson Presents	Nominated
1994	Evening Standard British Film Awards	Best Technical/Artistic Achievement	The Madness of King George	Won
