= Home Affairs (disambiguation) =

Home Affairs or Ministry of home affairs refers to an interior ministry in a government.

Home Affairs may also refer to:

- Home Affairs (TV series), South African television drama series from 2005
- Home Affairs (horse), Australian thoroughbred racehorse

== See also ==
- Ministry of Home Affairs (disambiguation)
- Internal affairs (disambiguation)
- Affair (disambiguation)
- Home (disambiguation)
