= IA =

IA, Ia, or ia may refer to:

== Arts and entertainment ==
- Ia, an 1892 novelette by Arthur Quiller-Couch
- "Iä", a fictional word in the works of H. P. Lovecraft
- International Alliance of Theatrical Stage Employees (IATSE), which also goes by IA
- International Artists, a record label

== Businesses and organizations ==
- Indian Airlines, defunct airline, 1953-2011
- Indiana Academy, high school in Cicero, Indiana
- International Academy, high school in Bloomfield Hills, Michigan
- Internet Archive, online digital library and host organization of the Wayback Machine
- Iraqi Airways, known by the IATA airline designator IA
- Impact assessment of public policy
- Insurance Authority, a statutory body in Hong Kong
- Aircraft model prefix of Fabrica Argentina de Aviones, e.g. FMA IA 62

== Government, law, and military ==
- Indian Army
- Indonesian Army
- Individual augmentee, U.S. military person temporarily assigned to a unit
- Indecent assault, sexual criminal offense

== Language ==
- Ia (cuneiform), a sign in cuneiform writing
- Inter alia (i.a.), Latin meaning "among other things"
- Interlingua (ISO 639-1 code: ia)
- Romanization of Cyrillic Я letter
- Inshallah (iA), used by English-speaking Muslims.

== People ==
- Saint Ia of Cornwall
- Mattias Eklundh, Swedish guitarist

== Places ==
- Iowa (IA), U.S. state, postal abbreviation
- Indiana (Ia), U.S. state, older traditional abbreviation
- Ia or Oia, Greece, on Santorini
- Iá River, a river in Brazil

== Science and technology ==
=== Archaeology ===
- Institute of Archaeology, Chinese Academy of Social Sciences (IA)
- IA, The Journal of the Society for Industrial Archeology
- Internet Archaeology, an electronic journal
- Industrial archaeology
- Iron Age, an archaeological period

=== Biology and medicine ===
- IA (chemotherapy), with Idarubicin and cytarabine
- Ia (genus), of vespertilionid bats
- Phase Ia of a clinical trial
- Immunoassay, biochemical test to measure concentrations through antibody or antigen

=== Computing and electronics ===
- IA (software), a vocaloid (singing synthesizer)
- IA-32, Intel Architecture, 32-bit
- IA-64, Intel Architecture, 64-bit
- Implicit authentication, by a smart device
- Human intelligence amplification through technology
- Intelligent agent, in artificial intelligence
- Artificial intelligence, abbreviated IA in several other languages
- Information architecture, the structural design of shared information
- Information assurance, dealing with trust aspects of information

=== Other uses in science and technology ===
- Group IA (or Ia), an obsolete designation for the group 1 elements
- Type Ia supernova, a subtype of Type I supernova
- Interactions of actors theory, by Gordon Pask

== Other uses ==
- Internal affairs (disambiguation)
- Intermediate in Arts, an academic degree
- Internal audit of an organization's operations
- International affairs, alternative term for International relations, the study of politics, economics and law on a global level
- Íþróttabandalag Akraness or ÍA, an Icelandic football team
- Mazda2, a 2002–present Japanese subcompact car, sold in North America as the Scion iA and Toyota Yaris iA

== See also ==
- 1A (disambiguation)
- AI (disambiguation)
