= 1A =

1A or 1-A may refer to:

== Arts and entertainment ==
- 1A (comics), a comic book robot
- 1A (radio program), an American radio program

== Politics ==
- First Amendment (disambiguation), the first amendment of various legislation

== Science and technology ==
- Group 1A, an obsolete designation for the group 1 elements
- AMY1A, a human gene
- Alpha-1A adrenergic receptor, a human gene
- Interferon beta-1a, a drug
- Meltwater pulse 1A, a period of rapid post-glacial sea level rise, 13,500–14,700 years ago
- Melatonin receptor 1A, a human gene
- Metallothionein 1A, a human gene
- MH-1A, a nuclear power reactor and the first floating nuclear power station
- Vasopressin receptor 1A, a major receptor type for vasopressin

== Sports ==
- Croatian 1A Volleyball League
- 1. A SKL, the 2002–2006 name of Premier A Slovenian Basketball League

== Transportation, military and space ==
- Adcox 1-A, an American 1929 biplane
- Astra 1A, a 1988 satellite
- Class 1-A, an American military service classification
- Little Joe 1A, a 1959 unmanned NASA launch
- Mercury-Redstone 1A, a 1969 NASA mission
- Packard 1A-1500, a 1929 piston aircraft engine
- Shin Meiwa US-1A, a Japanese anti-submarine warfare aircraft
- Sisu 1A, an American 1950s sailplane
- Türksat 1A, a Turkish satellite
- List of highways numbered 1A

== See also ==
- A1 (disambiguation)
- IA (disambiguation)
