= External =

External may refer to:

- Externality, in economics, the cost or benefit that affects a party who did not choose to incur that cost or benefit
- Externals, a fictional group of X-Men antagonists

== See also ==
- Internal (disambiguation)
