= Dragnet (1967 TV series) season 1 =

Dragnet
- Season 1
- No. of episodes: 17

Release
- Original network: NBC
- Original release: January 12 – May 11, 1967

Season chronology
- Next → Season 2

This is a list of episodes from the first season of the 1967 Dragnet series. The season was directed by Jack Webb.

== Broadcast history ==
The season originally aired Thursday at 9:30-10:00 pm (EST).

== DVD release ==
The DVD was released by Universal Studios Home Entertainment.

== Episodes ==
No. overall	No. in season	Title	Written by	Original release date
1	1	"The LSD Story"	Jack Webb (Credited as John Randolph)	January 12, 1967
Sergeant Joe Friday and his partner Bill Gannon investigate a freaked-out young LSD user, but find themselves unable to do anything to help as, at the time, LSD was not a controlled substance. In 1997, TV Guide ranked this episode #85 on its list of the 100 Greatest Episodes.
2	2	"The Big Explosion"	Robert C. Dennis	January 19, 1967
Two men rob a construction site of multiple cases of extremely powerful dynamite. When Friday and Gannon track down the primary thief, a fervent neo-Nazi, they find he has planted a bomb somewhere in Los Angeles. A prolonged interrogation goes nowhere until Friday is able to use his incessant demand for the current time against him, allowing the LAPD to locate the bomb inside an integrated school and defuse it. Future Adam-12 star Kent McCord appears as a patrolman.
3	3	"The Kidnapping"	Preston Wood	January 26, 1967
Friday and Gannon must help cosmetics employee Janet Ohrmand (Peggy Webber) rescue her boss, who has been taken hostage and held for $75,000 ransom.
4	4	"The Interrogation"	Preston Wood	February 9, 1967
A new officer (Kent McCord) has been arrested for robbing a liquor store while on an undercover assignment. During interrogation, the officer reveals that his girlfriend does not want him to be a police officer, which embitters him as the interrogation proceeds. In the end, the officer is cleared after a nearly-identical suspect confesses to the crime.
5	5	"The Masked Bandits"	David H. Vowell	February 16, 1967
Four bandits wearing red masks commit a series of robberies. Friday and Gannon uncover the gang after they learn one of them is a teenager married to an older woman.
6	6	"The Bank Examiner Swindle"	William O'Halloran	February 23, 1967
Friday and Gannon must stop two con men posing as bank examiners who are scamming the elderly out of their life savings. Harriet MacGibbon and Burt Mustin guest star as bunco con victims.
7	7	"The Hammer"	Henry Irving	March 2, 1967
An elderly apartment manager is found dead in his room, beaten to death with a hammer. A report of a stolen car belonging to another tenant helps Friday and Gannon track the killer to Cottonwood, Arizona, where the suspect is being held for separate crimes.
8	8	"The Candy Store Robberies"	Robert C. Dennis	March 9, 1967
Friday and Gannon try to figure out the pattern to a series of armed robberies at a specific chain of candy stores. Things take a turn when the suspect suddenly changes their pattern. The solution comes when they discover that there are two suspects.
9	9	"The Fur Job"	David H. Vowell	March 16, 1967
Friday and Gannon investigate the theft of expensive fur coats from a high-end clothing store. When they deduce that the thieves are familiar with fur quality, Gannon goes undercover as a buyer to catch the thieves as they attempt to sell their stolen wares.
10	10	"The Jade Story"	William O'Halloran	March 23, 1967
Over $200,000 worth of imperial jade is reported stolen from the Bel-Air estate of a wealthy woman, but the investigation uncovers discrepancies. After consulting a jade dealer and the woman's insurance company's investigator, Friday and Gannon believe a swindle is being made, even when it is found that a man did break into the estate.
11	11	"The Shooting"	David H. Vowell	March 30, 1967
A police officer (Don Marshall) is shot during a traffic stop on a pair of paroled convicts parked in a stolen car near a liquor store; the officer recovers, but has no memory of the shooting. The investigation slows until an informant's tip brings Friday and Gannon to a flophouse, but even after arresting two men the officer cannot remember them — a fact Friday can use against the suspects.
12	12	"The Hit and Run Driver"	David H. Vowell	April 6, 1967
Friday and Gannon investigate a hit-and-run that kills an elderly couple. Though the case is publicized, several leads go nowhere. When Friday and Gannon finally catch the suspect, a smug businessman with little respect for the victims and his wife, they are dismayed by his lenient sentence. Ultimately, he loses his legs in another fatal at-fault accident.
13	13	"The Bookie"	Preston Wood	April 13, 1967
Friday goes undercover with the Department's chaplain in order to break up an illegal gambling ring.
14	14	"The Subscription Racket"	Henry Irving	April 20, 1967
After an appearance on a local television talk show, Friday learns about a scam artist with a novel twist: the scammer uses an authentic Congressional Medal of Honor to solicit magazine subscriptions. Friday and Gannon root out the con artist when a check paid by one of the victims is altered and the scammer's ex-employer agrees to locate him.
15	15	"The Gun"	Henry Irving	April 27, 1967
A Japanese widow is senselessly murdered, leaving her small daughter an orphan. The murder affects even Friday, who has a hard time controlling his emotions while seeking her killer. The investigation stagnates until the detectives follow a tip provided earlier for a completely different crime in the same neighborhood, and the other victim identifies the suspect.
16	16	"The Big Kids"	David H. Vowell	May 4, 1967
Friday and Gannon investigate a gang of juvenile thieves who have been stealing petty items in order to gain membership into an exclusive club.
17	17	"The Bullet"	John Robinson	May 11, 1967
A man is found shot to death in a locked room. The case is initially ruled a suicide until the medical examiner reports that he was shot twice and that a different caliber handgun was used. Though the detectives initially suspect his wife killed him, the real suspect, the wife's elderly mother, reveals herself.
