= Michelle Sweeney =

Canadian actress and soul singer

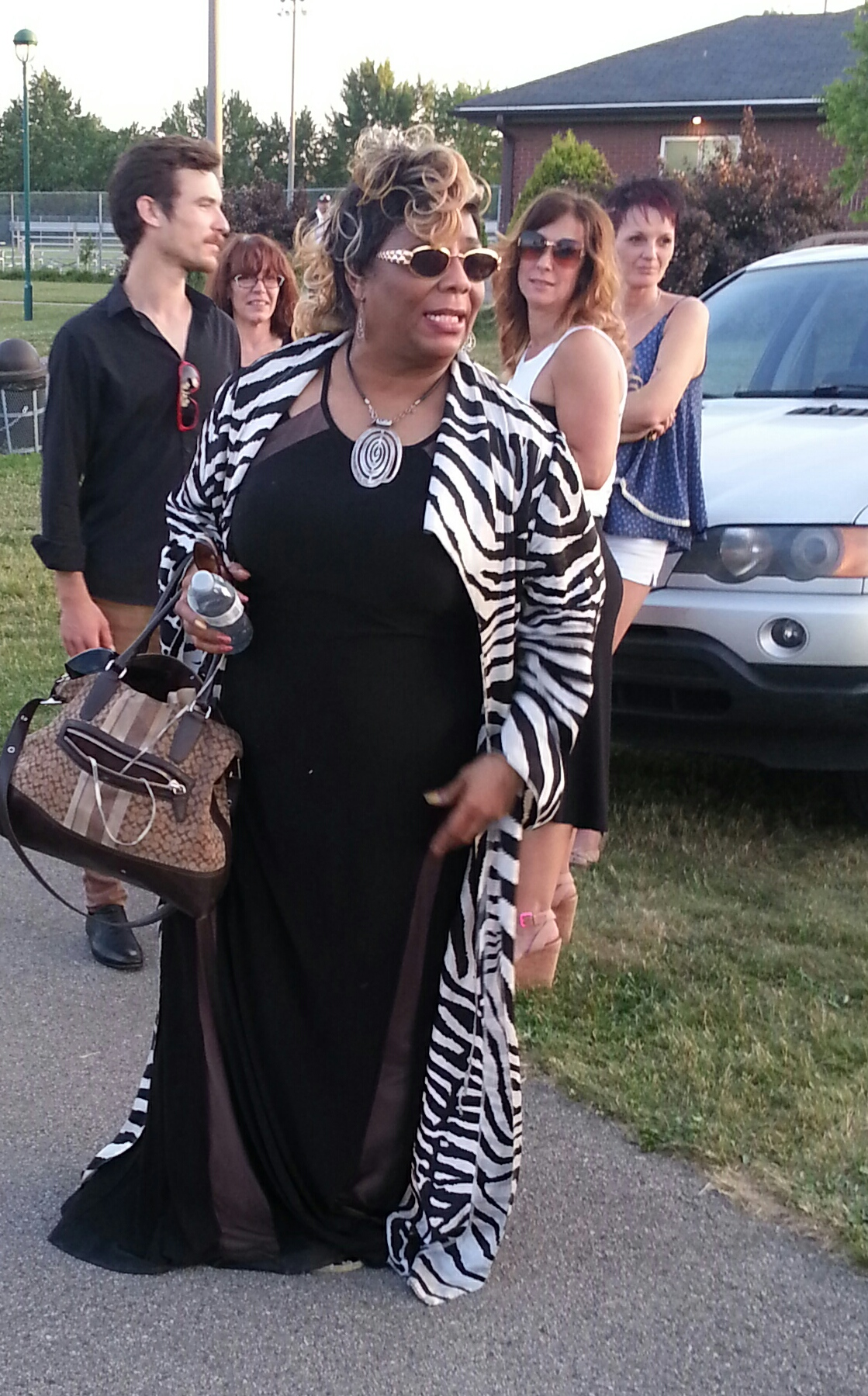

Background information
- Born: Cleveland, Ohio, United States
- Genres: Soul, jazz, blues, gospel
- Occupation: Singer

Michelle Sweeney is an American-Canadian actress and soul singer. Originally from Cleveland, Ohio, she moved to Montreal, Quebec in the 1980s to perform with the Montreal Jubilation Gospel Choir, and has remained based in Montreal since.

In addition to performing jazz, soul and blues music, she appeared alongside Ranee Lee and Anthony Sherwood in a 1986 production of Ain't Misbehavin'. She formed her own group, Michelle Sweeney's Good News Singers, in 1987, and released her first recorded single, "Our Love", that year. In 1988, she appeared on Quebec television alongside Céline Dion and Johanne Blouin, performing a medley of "Aquarius/Let the Sunshine In" from the musical Hair with "Quand on arrive en ville" from the musical Starmania, which saw Sweeney widely labelled as the star performer of the show.

In 1989 she starred in a production of the jazz revue Eubie!, and the following year she appeared as a tour guide in the docufiction film The Company of Strangers. She has also had selected other film and television roles throughout her career, most notably in a regular role as school principal Mrs. Morton in the Canadian teen comedy series Student Bodies from 1997 to 2000.

In 1998 she appeared in a production of the HIV/AIDS-themed musical Elegies for Angels, Punks and Raging Queens.

In 2000, Sweeney won the Martin Luther King Jr. Achievement Award for her career achievements.

In 2020 Sweeney premiered her own original one-woman show Her Songs, My Story, in which she blends performances of the music of Aretha Franklin with personal reminiscences of her own life, including the revelation that she suffered for many years as a victim of domestic abuse in her prior marriage.
