= Dragnet (1967 TV series) season 2 =

Dragnet
- Season 2
- No. of episodes: 28

Release
- Original network: NBC
- Original release: September 14, 1967 – March 28, 1968

Season chronology
- ← Previous; Season 1 Next → Season 3

This is a list of episodes from the second season of the 1967 Dragnet series. The season was directed by Jack Webb.

== Broadcast history ==
The season originally aired Thursdays at 9:30-10:00 pm (EST).

== Home media ==
The DVD was released by Shout! Factory.

== Episodes ==
No. overall	No. in season	Title	Written by	Original release date
18	1	"The Grenade"	Robert C. Dennis	September 14, 1967
An emotionally unstable teenager throws acid on the back of another student (Jan-Michael Vincent). When a follow-up investigation reveals he possesses a live hand grenade that is suspiciously no longer in his room, the LAPD races to locate him before he can harm another person.
19	2	"The Shooting Board"	David H. Vowell	September 21, 1967
After a regular day shift, Friday visits a laundrette while off-duty to buy cigarettes, when he discovers a burglar stealing money from the business. When the burglar shoots at Friday, he fires back; the burglar is struck but escapes with his girlfriend and is later found dead. The shooting is routinely investigated by the Scientific Investigation Division (SID), but Friday finds his career in jeopardy when the investigators cannot find proof that the man shot at him, let alone that he had a weapon. As the shooting board discusses their final verdict, proof is finally found when investigators take a closer look at a small mark in the laundrette. This episode was later remade on Quincy, M.E. as "A Dead Man's Truth".
20	3	"The Badge Racket"	Robert C. Dennis	September 28, 1967
Three con artists (Harry Lauter, Stacy Harris, Indus Arthur) have been swindling businessmen from out of town by posing as a prostitute and two vice detectives, tricking victims into paying the woman's "bail". Friday and Gannon go undercover in a hotel, with Gannon pretending to be a manufacturer from Lincoln, Nebraska.
21	4	"The Bank Jobs"	Robert C. Dennis	October 5, 1967
Friday and Gannon investigate a bank robbery committed by a man and a woman. Tracking their car down to a woman who matches a suspect's exact description, initially lies to them, and is already on probation, the detectives are certain they have a suspect, until more reports come in of other women being forced to rob a bank in the same way. Though the first woman is cleared of wrongdoing, the suspect's spree continues unabated until one victim fights back. Future Adam-12 star Kent McCord appears as an unnamed "officer".
22	5	"The Big Neighbor"	Robert C. Dennis	October 12, 1967
In a sitcom-esque change of formula, Gannon invites Joe to dinner and a televised football game at his home in Eagle Rock, California, but their afternoon is interrupted by neighbors asking Gannon for help with miscellany on the basis that he is a police officer. The mood shifts when a neighbor calls to report an actual emergency.
23	6	"The Big Frustration"	Sidney Morse	October 19, 1967
Sergeant Carl Maxwell, a fellow detective, goes AWOL after a case he worked on is dismissed; Friday and Gannon are given three days to track him down before Maxwell is terminated from the LAPD. When they find him drinking in a resort, he rants about the stresses of policing and claims he is a minority for being a cop, but a speech from Friday persuades him to go back. Bill Williams as Sgt. Bill Riddle, John Lupton as Sgt. Carl Maxwell
24	7	"The Senior Citizen"	Henry Irving	October 26, 1967
A series of daring daylight house burglaries take place, seemingly planned from wedding, funeral, and event notices in local newspapers. Friday and Gannon's investigation leads to an octogenarian (Burt Mustin) who, while very eccentric, is not clearly the suspect. A deeper investigation into his background reveals he is actually a repeat cat burglar.
25	8	"The Big High"	David H. Vowell	November 2, 1967
An elderly businessman, concerned about the welfare of his grandchild, informs Friday and Gannon that his daughter and son-in-law are using marijuana regularly. The young couple make no apologies for their lifestyle, but their constant drug use, paired with their poor parenting, leads to a horrible tragedy.
26	9	"The Big Ad"	Charles A. McDaniel	November 9, 1967
An ex-con named Steve Deal (Don Dubbins) contacts the LAPD when a classified ad that he placed, offering to do "anything" for money, results in a cryptic offer to commit murder. Friday and Gannon investigate, and Friday goes undercover as Deal to meet the suspect, a wealthy man who makes him go through a series of dead-end drives to prove his bonafides, then sets up the murder—the target is his wife. When Friday "kills" her, the suspect arrives to shoot the "intruder", but other officers arrive just before he can pull the trigger.
27	10	"The Missing Realtor"	Robert C. Dennis	November 16, 1967
A female real estate agent goes missing and turns up dead in a vacant house. The only suspect, the woman's ex-boyfriend, is cleared. Suddenly, the victim's credit card starts getting billed for purchases she could not have made. When more reports of credit card thefts from realtors come in, Friday and Gannon identify and catch the suspect right before he can strike again.
28	11	"The Big Dog"	Henry Irving	November 23, 1967
Friday and Gannon are assigned to an unusual case: reports of a dog stealing purses and running off with them. The investigation becomes even stranger when the victims give different descriptions of the dog. Officer Dorothy Miller and other female officers go undercover to catch the dog in the act; when a theft occurs right in front of Miller, Friday and Gannon pursue and corner the suspect, and find more than one dog with him—all stolen.
29	12	"The Pyramid Swindle"	Norman Lessing	November 30, 1967
A female con-artist (Virginia Gregg) uses an evangelistic approach to lure buyers into her pyramid scheme. The Fraud Division is unable to charge her with false advertising, so they prosecute her for operating a lottery. When the case goes to trial, the con-artist appears to have an air-tight defense until the prosecuting attorney (Bert Fields) finds a fatal gap in the con's logic.
30	13	"The Phony Police Racket"	Henry Irving	December 7, 1967
When the LAPD receives an angry complaint against a (nonexistent) "Captain Paul G. Fremont", Friday and Gannon investigate a scam involving the Los Angeles branch of the "National Association for Law Enforcement", a phony police organization and magazine, which comes with a courtesy card for subscribers supposedly entitling the bearer to preferential treatment from the police. Friday and Gannon go undercover with a construction worker scheduled to meet with "Sergeant Densmore", who brings them to NALE's headquarters, allowing them to shut down the operation for good. Officer Jim Reed from Adam-12 cameos.
31	14	"The Trial Board"	Sidney Morse	December 14, 1967
A police officer is accused of taking a bribe from a professional bookie. The officer has picked Friday to represent him at his trial board hearing. In spite of witness claims, the officer insists he refused the bookie's offer. It takes a close examination of the bookie's checkbook for Friday and the board to learn what really happened: the bookie was simply repaying the officer a loan from their military service days, and he committed perjury after the officer refused to get Vice Division to turn a blind eye to him in return.
32	15	"The Christmas Story"	Richard L. Breen	December 21, 1967
A figure of baby Jesus is stolen from a church's nativity scene set. Friday and Gannon are tasked with finding it before Christmas—which is in less than 48 hours. After checking people of interest but gaining no progress, the detectives are dismayed to learn it is almost Christmas, but when they return to the church to update the priest on the case, a small boy arrives to return the figure, explaining that he simply wanted to give it a ride in his new red wagon. This episode is a remake of the 1953 Dragnet episode "The Big Little Jesus".
33	16	"The Big Shipment"	David H. Vowell	December 28, 1967
A light plane crashes in the San Fernando Valley, carrying several pounds of drugs and a note in the cockpit requesting a drop five hours from then. By the time the pilot, who fled the scene, is found, there is only an hour left; the pilot reluctantly gives up the drop location, and the Narcotics Division ambushes the collection team. The two suspects attempt to trick the detectives by pretending one is blind and dumb, but Friday sees through their act and gets them to identify their boss.
34	17	"The Big Search"	Preston Wood and Robert Soderberg	January 4, 1968
Two small girls, ages three and five, go missing. Their mother is certain that her ex-husband, an alcoholic, has kidnapped them. However, he has since cleaned up his act and has no knowledge of the girls' whereabouts. The search seems hopeless until Friday and Gannon, acting on information about a former neighbor and her dog, go to her apartment and find the girls safe with the dog. They deduce that the dog had returned to its old neighborhood, and the girls played with the dog and followed it back.
35	18	"The Big Prophet"	David H. Vowell	January 11, 1968
Friday and Gannon are convinced that "Brother" William Bentley, a man convicted of defrauding elderly ladies of their pension checks, is operating the Temple of the Expanded Mind as a front for him to sell LSD to the students of a nearby elementary school. Though they are unable to arrest Bentley, Friday and Gannon debate him on drug policy before they leave. Later, Bentley is arrested for attempting to sell narcotics to a minor.
36	19	"The Big Amateur"	Henry Irving	January 25, 1968
Angelenos are full of praise for Officer Gideon C. Dengle; they want to bestow him with awards, honors and treats. But the LAPD encounters a problem with Officer Dengle: he isn't actually a police officer. Witness questioning only leads to praise from various citizens who genuinely believe Dengle is a real LAPD officer. None of his behavior is malicious, to the point that even the tickets he issues direct payment to the LAPD, not himself. Eventually, the detectives are informed Dengle has "retired" from the LAPD, only for reports to come in of Dengle directing traffic at a residential fire, now "working" for the LAFD. Friday and Gannon arrive at the scene, where they meet Dengle himself; as they take him into custody, he reads his own rights and explains his knowledge of procedure: he was once a real police officer himself.
37	20	"The Big Starlet"	Robert C. Dennis	February 1, 1968
A woman reports her teenage niece has run away, intent on becoming a film star in Hollywood. Friday and Gannon investigate and learn she has wound up in pornographic films. Working with Vice Division, the detectives question a former porn star and interrogate a porn film producer, eventually locating her rooming house. However, they find that she has killed herself by overdosing on barbiturates.
38	21	"The Big Clan"	Michael Donovan	February 8, 1968
While investigating a fortune telling scam, Friday is offered a bribe to assist a Romani family trying to gain control of the Romani community in Los Angeles. Going along with their operation, Friday is ordered to protect the family's businesses and harass other Romani businesses until all Romani businesses in the city are theirs. Working a sting operating with Miller, the family is brought in.
39	22	"The Little Victim"	Robert Soderberg	February 15, 1968
While doing a speech on child abuse, Friday and Gannon are called to investigate the beating of a nine-month-old boy. The detectives investigate the parents, Walter (Kiel Martin) and Louise Marshall (Brooke Bundy), who are more concerned about their failing relationship than their child. When they interview the parents, they learn Walter is abusive and Louise is unusually clingy to her husband. Walter is promptly arrested and imprisoned for a year, while Louise is placed on probation. However, after Walter is released from prison, the detectives respond to Louise's apartment again, where they find Walter has killed the baby.
40	23	"The Big Squeeze"	Jerry D. Lewis	February 22, 1968
Friday and Gannon interrogate an ex-con accused of extortion. He calmly and smugly insists that he is innocent, but Friday and Gannon have a surprise for him: taped conversations and a voice analysis device. In the end, he also admits to murder.
41	24	"The Suicide Attempt"	Robert C. Dennis	February 29, 1968
Friday and Gannon learn that a man has called his mother from Hollywood "to say goodbye". After interviewing his dismissive wife, the detectives speak to his sister and attempt to trace his location when he calls her; though he hangs up before he can say where he is, they learn he is attempting to overdose on barbiturates. The phone company manages to trace him to the Hollywood Elsinore hotel, but the detectives cannot find his room. They identify a go-go dancer he conversed with and, using the description of the view from his window he mentioned to her, they finally locate his room. The man is hospitalized, institutionalized by the request of his sister, and eventually released.
42	25	"The Big Departure"	Preston Wood	March 7, 1968
Friday and Gannon investigate a series of thefts and burglaries from various stores across the city. They note the thefts appear to be basic necessities, such as food, tools, camping gear, and medicine. The investigation leads to a group of rebellious juveniles who are determined to start their own utopian society on a remote island off the coast of California. Friday and Gannon interrogate the group and deconstruct the unrealistic idea of their utopia before taking them in.
43	26	"The Investigation"	Robert C. Dennis	March 14, 1968
Friday is screening applicants for the Los Angeles Police Academy with a civilian review panel. Friday and Gannon review several applicants and check their background information. One particular applicant, Harry Lanham, seems to qualify, but a deeper search reveals concerning behavior. Though the detectives get most of his story, they find six months are missing from his application. Taking a lengthy detour to investigate further, they learn he worked for a small town police department for those six months and was fired for excessive force. Satisfied with their investigation, the detectives finish their background check trip, and Lanham's application is declined.
44	27	"The Big Gambler"	Robert Soderberg	March 21, 1968
Over $100,000 has been embezzled from an industrial company. An investigation of the employees leads Friday and Gannon to a habitual gambler. They follow him to a legal casino outside Los Angeles, and arrest him for embezzlement. While being interrogated, the man admits to embezzlement and his gambling problem, and the detectives advise him to seek therapy. Comedian Buddy Lester plays a bartender.
45	28	"The Big Problem"	Michael Donovan	March 28, 1968
Friday and Gannon are tasked with handling community relations between the LAPD and the citizenry. An African-American couple file a complaint against a pair of officers who treated them like criminals during a traffic stop; Friday and Gannon explain that their vehicle simply matched a wanted vehicle connected to burglaries in their area, and Friday later chastises the officers for their antagonizing behavior on patrol. Later, a young African-American man who stormed out of an earlier citizen's group meeting barricades himself in his apartment rather than submit to a traffic warrant; Friday reassures him that, contrary to his beliefs, the police are not trying to harm him, and the man submits and is simply fined in court for the traffic offense. At the end of the episode, real-life LAPD Chief Thomas Reddin makes a plea for a mutual understanding between the community, the viewer, and the police.
