= The Affair =

The Affair may refer to:

- Affair, a sexual relationship or a romantic friendship or passionate attachment between two people
- The Dreyfus affair, a political scandal that divided France from its inception in 1894 until its resolution in 1906
- The Affair (band), a pop music group formed in 1966

== Books ==
- The Affair (Snow novel), a 1960 novel by C. P. Snow in the Strangers and Brothers series
  - The Affair (play) by a 1962 Broadway play by Ronald Millar based on Snow's novel
  - The Affair (Wednesday Theatre), a 1965 Australian TV film
- The Affair (Child novel), a 2011 novel by Lee Child
- The Affair, a 1958 novel by Hans Koning
- The Affair, a novel by Santa Montefiore

== Film and TV ==
- There's Always Vanilla or The Affair, a 1971 film directed by George A. Romero
- The Affair, a British television film starring Felix Aylmer
- The Affair (1967 film), a 1967 film directed by Yoshishige Yoshida
- The Affair (1973 film), a 1973 television film starring Natalie Wood and Robert Wagner
- The Affair (1995 film), a television war film starring Courtney B. Vance, Kerry Fox and Ned Beatty
- The Affair (2004 film), a 2004 motion picture directed by Carl Colpaert
- The Affair (2019 film), a 2019 Czech motion picture directed by Julius Ševčík
- The Affair (TV series), an American television series, 2014–2019
- "The Affair" (Ally McBeal), a 1997 episode
- "The Affair" (Peep Show), a 2009 episode
- "The Affair", a 2005 episode of Drake & Josh

== See also ==
- Affair (disambiguation)
