= Book Club (film) =

2018 film by Bill Holderman and Erin Simms

- Theatrical release poster
- Directed by: Bill Holderman
- Written by: Bill Holderman; Erin Simms
- Produced by: Andrew Duncan; Erin Simms; Bill Holderman; Alex Saks
- Starring: Diane Keaton; Jane Fonda; Candice Bergen; Mary Steenburgen; Craig T. Nelson; Andy García; Don Johnson
- Cinematography: Andrew Dunn
- Edited by: Priscilla Nedd-Friendly
- Music by: Peter Nashel
- Production companies: June Pictures; Endeavor Content
- Distributed by: Paramount Pictures
- Release date: May 18, 2018 (United States)
- Running time: 104 minutes
- Country: United States
- Language: English
- Budget: $10 million
- Box office: $106 million

Book Club is a 2018 American romantic comedy film directed by Bill Holderman (in his directorial debut), who co-wrote the screenplay with Erin Simms. The film stars Diane Keaton, Jane Fonda, Candice Bergen, and Mary Steenburgen as four friends who read Fifty Shades of Grey as part of their monthly book club, and subsequently begin to change how they view their personal relationships.

The film was released on May 18, 2018, by Paramount Pictures. It received mixed reviews from critics and was a box office success, grossing over $106 million worldwide against its $14 million budget. A sequel, Book Club: The Next Chapter, was released in May 2023.

== Plot ==
Four women who have participated in their monthly book club for 40 years read Fifty Shades of Grey and become intrigued by its content. They decide to expand their lives and pursue pleasures that have previously eluded them.

While flying to visit her daughters in Arizona, Diane meets Mitchell and they strike up a relationship – although she is hesitant because her husband died only a year ago and she has not dated in decades. Vivian spends more time with Arthur, but her fear of commitment makes her keep him at a distance. Carol is frustrated with her husband's refusal to have sex with her, and reading the book makes her realize they are missing something. Sharon starts an online dating account to start dating again.

The group goes on to read Fifty Shades Darker and Fifty Shades Freed at the book club, while trying to figure out how to solve their problems. Diane's daughters see her as needing them to look after her, continually pressuring her to move to Arizona although she does not want to leave her friends.

Diane sneaks away to see Mitchell, and when her daughters cannot reach her, they send the police out to find her. On discovering her at Mitchell's, they insist she move into the basement of one of their homes, essentially ending her relationship with him. Eventually, Diane tells her daughters that though she is older, she does not need to be under surveillance. She packs up her belongings and leaves for Mitchell's, where they resume their relationship.

Arthur asks Vivian to commit to being in a relationship and she declines, despite his assurances that he wants her to continue being independent. Soon after he leaves for the airport, Vivian realizes she has made a mistake and goes after him. She misses his airplane, but on returning to her hotel she finds Arthur waiting for her and they rekindle their relationship.

Carol, frustrated that Bruce is refusing to have sex with her, tries various ways to entice him, to which he is oblivious. She eventually spikes his beer with viagra, which angers him as that is not what is causing the problem, and they continue to not have sex. Bruce admits that he has been stressed because he retired, and does not know what to do with himself. They eventually reconcile after dancing together in a fund-raising talent show.

After a few dates with men she meets online, Sharon decides that the scene is not for her. She then gives a speech at her son's joint engagement party with her ex-husband, where she realizes that everyone deserves to be in love and happy. She opens her online dating account again, in the hopes of finding someone.

== Cast ==
- Diane Keaton as Diane
- Jane Fonda as Vivian
- Candice Bergen as Sharon
- Mary Steenburgen as Carol
- Andy García as Mitchell
- Don Johnson as Arthur
- Craig T. Nelson as Bruce
- Richard Dreyfuss as George
- Alicia Silverstone as Jill
- Katie Aselton as Adrianne
- Ed Begley Jr. as Tom
- Wallace Shawn as Derek
- Lili Bordán as Irene
- Tommy Dewey as Chris
- Mircea Monroe as Cheryl

E. L. James (author of the entire Fifty Shades book series) and her husband Niall Leonard make a cameo appearance as Carol and Bruce's neighbors.

== Production ==
In May 2017, it was announced Diane Keaton, Jane Fonda and Candice Bergen had joined the cast of the film, with Bill Holderman directing, from a screenplay by himself and Erin Simms. Holderman and Simms also produced the film, along with Andrew Duncan and Alex Saks, the latter two under their June Pictures banner. In July 2017, Mary Steenburgen joined the cast, and in August 2017, Andy García, Don Johnson, Craig T. Nelson, Richard Dreyfuss, Ed Begley Jr., Wallace Shawn, Alicia Silverstone, Tommy Dewey and Katie Aselton joined as well.

Principal photography began in August 2017 around Santa Clarita, California.

== Release ==
In November 2017, Paramount Pictures acquired U.S., UK and France distribution rights to the film. It was released on May 18, 2018. Book Club was released on Digital HD, Blu-ray and DVD in August 2018.

== Reception ==
=== Box office ===
Book Club grossed $68.6 million in the United States and Canada, and $37.4 million in other territories, for a worldwide total of $106 million.

In the United States and Canada, the film was released alongside Deadpool 2 and Show Dogs, and was projected to gross around $10 million from 2,781 theaters in its opening weekend. It made $4.7 million on its first day, including $625,000 from Thursday night previews. It went on to debut to $13.6 million, finishing third, behind Deadpool 2 and Avengers: Infinity War; 80% of its audience was female while 88% was over the age of 35. It dropped just 25% in its second weekend to $10.1 million, finishing fourth, and continued to hold well in its third weekend, grossing $6.8 million and finishing fifth.

=== Critical response ===
On review aggregation website Rotten Tomatoes, the film has an approval rating of 54% based on 186 reviews, and an average rating of 5.4/10. The website's critical consensus reads, "Book Club only intermittently rises to the level of its impressive veteran cast; fortunately, they're more than enough to bring pedestrian material entertainingly to life." On Metacritic, the film has a weighted average score of 53 out of 100, based on 37 critics, indicating "mixed or average" reviews. Audiences polled by CinemaScore gave the film an average grade of "A−" on an A+ to F scale, while PostTrak reported filmgoers gave it 4 out of 5 stars.

== Sequel ==
In June 2019, Mary Steenburgen confirmed news of a sequel. In September 2019, producer and co-writer of the film, Erin Simms, offered further confirmation. The script was written, but due to the COVID-19 pandemic filming was put back to mid 2021 and the film was expected to be released in 2022. It was expected that the characters Diane, Vivian, Sharon, Carol, Mitchell, Arthur, Bruce, Jill and Adrianne would all reappear. In May 2022, Variety announced that the sequel, titled Book Club: The Next Chapter, had begun production with Keaton, Fonda, Bergen, Steenburgen, Garcia, Johnson, and Nelson reprising their roles from the first film. Focus Features will replace Paramount as domestic distributor, with Universal Pictures distributing internationally. In July 2022, Deadline confirmed that the sequel's release date is set for May 12, 2023.
