= Internals =

Internals usually refers to the internal parts of a machine, organism or other entity; or to the inner workings of a process.

More specifically, internals may refer to:

- the internal organs
- the gastrointestinal tract

== See also ==
- Internal (disambiguation)
