= List of Sidekick episodes =

This is a list of episodes from the YTV animated comedy Sidekick.

== Series overview ==
Season	Episodes	Originally released	
Season	Episodes	First released	Last released
Funpak	5	2005	
1	26	September 3, 2010	February 19, 2011
2	14	October 8, 2011	April 14, 2012
3	12	June 1, 2013	September 14, 2013

== Episodes ==
=== Funpak shorts (2005) ===
The five Funpak shorts were released in 2005 before the idea of turning the shorts into a TV series.

No.	Title	Original release date	Prod. code
1	"Alien Transformation"	2005	S01
It is revealed that Pamplemoose used to be Trevor's dad's old friend from college before Trevor's dad turned Pamplemoose from a human to who he is now.
2	"Tic-Tac-Toc"	2005	S02
Eric and Trevor play Tic-Tac-Toe with Maxum Brain.
3	"The Maxipad"	2005	S03
Eric and Trevor root around Maximan's secret lair, the Maxipad.
4	"The Evil Trevor"	2005	S04
Master XOX's evil hot dog is eaten by Trevor, who now has the evil that XOX always wanted.
5	"The Slumber Party"	2005	S05
Eric and Trevor try to crash a slumber party hosted by Vana and Kitty, but fail.

=== Season 1 (2010–11) ===
This season contains 26 episodes.

No.	Title	Directed by	Written by	Storyboard by	Original air date	Prod. code
1	"Maxum Man Mark Two"	Joey So	Simon Racioppa & Richard Elliott	Paul Watling	September 3, 2010	101
1	"To Party Perchance to Party"	Joey So	Simon Racioppa & Richard Elliott	Joey So	September 3, 2010	101
Maxum Man Mark Two: While trying to clone Maxum Man, Eric and Trevor end up with a half-human, half-hamster monster; they must try and hide him before villain Man Maid arrives. To Party Perchance To Party: Eric and Trevor try to crash Vana's party while also dealing with supervillain Drilliam Shakespeare.
2	"Gone Gaga"	Joey So	Doug Hadders & Adam Rotstein	Greg Collinson	September 4, 2010	102
2	"Like Supervillain, Like Son"	Joey So	Doug Hadders & Adam Rotstein	Sahle Robinson	September 4, 2010	102
Gone Gaga: Eric tries new supergoggles to make Vana fall for him, only for it to make everyone love him after a malfunction. Like Supervillain Like Son: Community Service Day goes horribly wrong when Eric and Trevor are forced to work for the villains, where Master XOX tries to turn Trevor evil.
3	"A Monster Headache"	Joey So	Doug Hadders & Adam Rotstein	Paul Watling	September 11, 2010	103
3	"Days of Golly"	Joey So	Doug Hadders & Adam Rotstein	Ted Collyer	September 11, 2010	103
A Monster Headache: Trevor's project turns Professor Pampelmoose into a plant-like monster. Days of Golly: Golly Gee Kid, Maxum Man's former sidekick and janitor of the school, wants to relive his sidekick days.
4	"Ain't No Party Like a Maxum Brain Party	Joey So	Shawn Kalb	Sahle Robinson	September 18, 2010	104
4	"Hello Dolly"	Joey So	Ben Joseph	Greg Collinson	September 18, 2010	104
Ain't No Party Like a Maxum Brain Party: Trevor gives Maxum Brain a virus that turns him into a wild party animal. Hello Dolly: Eric finds out he is the most famous sidekick in the world, and quickly lets that fame go to his head; meanwhile, a villain called The Entrepreneurinator takes advantage of the situation.
5	"The Amazing Super Chores"	Joey So	Grant Sauve	Paul Watling	September 25, 2010	105
5	"Maxum Mom"	Joey So	Grant Sauve	Ted Collyer	September 25, 2010	105
The Amazing Super Chores: Eric tries not to fail at his super-chores, and in the process creates a giant ribbon monster. Maxum Mom: Maxum Man's mom comes for a visit, and Eric poses as him to ensure to her he's still around.
6	"Moustachesquatch"	Joey So	Dan Williams & Lienne Sawatsky	Greg Collinson	October 2, 2010	106
6	"The Endless Summer"	Joey So	Scott Albert	Sahle Robinson	October 2, 2010	106
Moustachesquatch: A curse turns Eric into a moustache-like monster. The Endless Summer: Eric, Trevor and his dad hit the road for a summer vacation, and things quickly go away.
7	"Identity Crisis"	Joey So	Ken Cuperus	Paul Watling	October 9, 2010	107
7	"Fart of Darkness"	Joey So	Mike Kiss	Ted Collyer	October 9, 2010	107
Identity Crisis: Eric comes up with a new, cooler persona, only to discover that he mistakenly copied the bully Kid Ruthless. Fart of Darkness: Eric and Trevor are sent back to super-preschool and have to deal with the super babies.
8	"The Bogey Man"	Joey So	Sean Jara	Greg Collinson	October 16, 2010	108
8	"Crudburger"	Joey So	Ben Joseph	Sahle Robinson	October 16, 2010	108
The Bogey Man: The kids cooperate to defeat an evil golfer called The Bogey Man. Crudburger: Eric and Trevor go to the evil side of town to obtain a forbidden hamburger.
9	"The Henchman Challenge"	Joey So	Scott Albert	Paul Watling	October 23, 2010	109
9	"Family Fun Day"	Joey So	Dan Williams & Lienne Sawatsky	Ted Collyer	October 23, 2010	109
The Henchman Challenge: The gang competes against XOX's evil henchmen in an Olympics-type event where cheating is a necessity to proceed. Family Fun Day: Eric and Maxum Brain are forced to compete at the Family Fun Day event, where sidekicks and their families battle each other.
10	"Slime Spree"	Joey So	Shawn Kalb	Sahle Robinson	October 30, 2010	110
10	'The Short List"	Joey So	Mike Kiss	Greg Collinson & Paul Watling	October 30, 2010	110
Slime Spree: Eric cares for an alien spore and becomes so attached to it, he hides it so it won't go home, until its angry mother heads straight for Earth. The Short List: It is revealed Vana was originally chosen to be Maxum Man's sidekick, causing Eric to quit when she proves to do things much better than he does.
11	"This Hour Has 22 Million Minutes"	Joey So	Ken Cuperus	Ted Collyer	November 6, 2010	111
11	"Halloweenie"	Joey So	Doug Hadders & Adam Rotstein	Greg Collinso	November 6, 2010	111
This Hour Has 22 Million Minutes: A time loop created by the villain The Clock Puncher forces Eric to live the same day over and over again. Halloweenie: An evil wizard with a grudge against Maxum Man casts a spell that gives everyone who is dressed as Maxum Man for Halloween his powers, and it causes total chaos.
12	"Eric Squared"	Joey So	Doug Hadders & Adam Rotstein	Sahle Robinson	November 13, 2010	112
12	"Squawk"	Joey So	Richard Clark	Paul Watling	November 13, 2010	112
Eric Squared: Eric and Trevor travel in an alternate dimension and meet evil versions of themselves, who travel to the present and kidnap Vana and Kitty. Squawk: Eric pretends to be Maxum Man on social media.
13	"Internal Affairs"	Joey So	Shawn Kalb	Ted Collyer	November 20, 2010	113
13	"Virtual Mayhem"	Joey So	Alex Nussbaum	Craig Valde	November 20, 2010	113
Internal Affairs: Vana, Kitty and Trevor try to stop Master XOX from going inside of Eric. Virtual Mayhem: Master XOX uses a video game to steal stuff.
14	"The Maxum Switcheroo"	Joey So	Aaron Barnett	Sahle Robinson	November 27, 2010	114
14	"Sleepless in Splittsboro"	Joey So	Dan Williams & Lienne Sawatsky	Paul Watling	November 27, 2010	114
The Maxum Switch-eroo: Someone poses as Maxum Man. Sleepless in Splittsboro: A ghostly villain named Nocturna invades the gang's dreams.
15	"Everybody is Side-Fu Fighting"	Joey So	Dan Williams & Lienne Sawatsky	Joey So & Kerry Sargent	December 4, 2010	115
15	"Comic Book Zombies"	Joey So	Shawn Kalb	Craig Valde	December 4, 2010	115
Everybody is Side-Fu Fighting: Eric, Kitty, Vana and Trevor learn side-fu from Sensei Jimmy, Maxum Man's old teacher. Comic Book Zombies: A villain named Mint Condition wants to add Eric and Trevor to his collection.
16	"Beneath the Missile-Toe"	Joey So	Doug Hadders & Adam Rotstein	Paul Watling	December 11, 2010	116
16	"Ice to Know You"	Joey So	Shawn Kalb	Sahle Robinson & Paul Watling	December 11, 2010	116
Beneath the Missile-Toe: Eric ruins Christmas when he accidentally blows up Mega Santa. Ice to Know You: Eric uses a machine to make it cold on a heatwave, but it backfires.
17	"Ye Olde Sidekick Village"	Joey So	Dan Williams & Lienne Sawatsky	Craig Valde	December 18, 2010	117
17	"News at 11AM"	Joey So	Doug Hadders & Adam Rotstein	Sahle Robinson	December 18, 2010	117
Ye Olde Sidekick Village: The gang goes on a field trip to an old western ghost town where a technology-hating villain, Sheriff Marshall, holds them prisoner. News at 11AM: The gang joins the news club, and Eric becomes jealous of the new reporter, Allan Amazing.
18	"Suit of Harms"	Joey So	Richard Clark	Paul Watling	December 25, 2010	118
18	"Escape from Razzuma-traz"	Joey So	Aaron Barnett	Sahle Robinson	December 25, 2010	118
Suit of Harms: The gang are given new safety suits and become immobilized by them. Escape from Razzuma-traz: The gang must pass a dangerous test after a villainous teacher, Ms. Razzuma, threatens to blast them into space.
19	"Gloves on the Run"	Joey So	Dan Williams & Lienne Sawatsky	Paul Watling & Nick Cross	January 1, 2011	119
19	"Drop the Needles"	Joey So	Andrew Harrison	Craig Valde	January 1, 2011	119
Gloves on the Run: Eric gets new super gloves and gets popular with them, unaware that they're XOX's. Drop the Needles: Eric challenges Kid Ruthless to a "DJ battle".
20	"Match Dot Com"	Joey So	Andrew Harrison	Paul Watling	January 8, 2011	120
20	"Stupor-ize Me"	Joey So	Richard Clark	Sahle Robinson	January 8, 2011	120
Match Dot Com: Eric takes a girl to the school dance, unaware that she is Mandy Struction, a henchgirl from the evil side of town. Stupor-ize Me: Eric and Trevor get jobs at Swell Burger, until they find that their manager is acting suspiciously.
21	"Teenage Mummies in Love"	Joey So	Shawn Kalb	Craig Valde	January 15, 2011	121
21	"Henchman for a Day"	Joey So	Richard Clark	Nick Cross	January 15, 2011	121
Teenage Mummies in Love: Teen heartthrob Joshua Sideburns is shooting a movie in Splitsboro, and he makes Eric and Trevor his bodyguards. Henchman for a Day: Eric goes to the bad side of town for the student exchange program and ends up enjoying it a lot more than his normal life, mainly because Mandy, who has grown a bit of affection for Eric since their last encounter in "Match Dot Com", is there too.
22	"The Show Must Go On"	Joey So	Doug Hadders & Adam Rotstein	Sahle Robinson	January 22, 2011	122
22	"Pamplemoose and Son"	Joey So	Ken Cuperus	Kerry Sargent	January 22, 2011	122
The Show Must Go On: Eric is determined to stay alive in a school play directed by Drilliam Shakespeare so that he can kiss Vana. Pamplemoose and Son: Eric discovers that he may be Pamplemoose's long lost son.
23	"Little Orphan Eric"	Joey So	Andrew Harrison	Craig Valde	January 29, 2011	123
23	"Lights, Camera, Sidekick Action"	Joey So	Dan Wiliams & Lienne Sawatsky	Nick Cross	January 29, 2011	123
Little Orphan Eric: Eric returns to the orphanage and reunites with an old friend. Lights, Camera, Sidekick Action: Eric competes with Allan Amazing to star in a movie.
24	"Shopping Spree"	Joey So	Doug Hadders & Adam Rotstein	Peter Roe	February 5, 2011	124
24	"The Spark is Gone"	Joey So	Doug Hadders & Adam Rotstein	Sahle Robinson	February 5, 2011	124
Shopping Spree: Eric and Maxum Mom go shopping at Supers R' Us. The Spark is Gone: Eric and Trevor get stuck with Static Clint on Shadow a Super Day.
25	"Four's a Crowd"	Joey So	Shawn Kalb	Nick Cross	February 12, 2011	125
25	"Super Frenemies"	Joey So	Doug Hadders & Adam Rotstein	Craig Valde	February 12, 2011	125
Four's a Crowd: Splitsboro is destroyed and only the four main sidekicks remain. Super Frenemies: Eric dumps Trevor as his best friend because he keeps getting Eric in trouble.
26	"Maxum Brain, Interrupted"	Joey So	Shawn Kalb	David Baggley & Joey So	February 19, 2011	126
26	"Wrinkle Resistant"	Joey So	Dan Williams & Lienne Sawatsky	Sahle Robinson	February 19, 2011	126
Maxum Brain, Interrupted: Maxum Brain quits the mansion and quickly regrets his decision. Wrinkle Resistant: Trevor's grandfather tries to turn him evil.

=== Season 2 (2011–12) ===
This season contains 14 episodes.

No. overall	No. in season	Title	Directed by	Written by	Storyboard by	Original air date	Prod. code
27	1	"My Brother, My Pimple"	Joey So	Craig Martin	Paul Watling	October 8, 2011	201
27	1	"The Superest Day of the Year"	Joey So	Richard Clark	Kerry Sargent	October 8, 2011	201
My Brother, My Pimple: Eric gets a pimple which grows into a Siamese twin-type clone attached to his face. The Superest Day of the Year: Eric experiences his first parade on Hurray for Splittsboro Day, which makes Eric realize that the celebration is dangerous!
28	2	"Love Fights"	Joey So	Heather Jackson	Sebastian Duclos	October 15, 2011	202
28	2	"A Sidecar Named Desire"	Joey So	Mark Steinberg	David Baggley	October 15, 2011	202
Love Fights: Eric fights through other suitors to give Vana his Valentine's Day card. A Sidecar Named Desire: The boys modify the sidecar.
29	3	"Circus Jerkus"	Joey So	Andrew Harrison	Paul Watling	October 22, 2011	203
29	3	"Anty Maim"	Joey So	Andrew Harrison	Kerry Sargent & Kyu-bum Lee	October 22, 2011	203
Circus Jerkus: Kidnapped superheroes are made to perform at the circus. Anty Maim: Giant ants rule the world.
30	4	"The Heartbreak Golly Gee Kid"	Joey So	Richard Clark	Blair Kitchen	November 5, 2011	204
30	4	"App-y Days"	Joey So	David Dias	Joey So, Kerry Sargent & Paul Watling	November 5, 2011	204
The Heartbreak Golly Gee Kid: The new mysterious lunch lady has a crush on the Golly Gee Kid. App-y Days: Maxum Brain makes a smartphone app.
31	5	"Exchange Student From the Black Lagoon"	Joey So	Shawn Kalb	Paul Watling	November 26, 2011	205
31	5	"Fortress of Maxumtude"	Joey So	David Dias	David Baggley	November 26, 2011	205
Exchange Student From the Black Lagoon: Eric accidentally eats a member of his new friend Finn's family. Fortress of Maxumtude: Eric discovers that Maxum Man has a secret fortress and searches all over for it.
32	6	"Insane in the Cranial"	Joey So	Shawn Kalb	Blair Kitchen	December 3, 2011	206
32	6	"What's He Hiding?"	Joey So	Craig Martin	Jeff Bittle	December 3, 2011	206
Insane in the Cranial: The sidekicks vie for a spot at the Cranials, hosted by Allan Amazing. What's He Hiding?: Vana thinks Eric is hiding something in the mansion.
33	7	"House of Helmut"	Joey So	Craig Martin	Paul Watling	January 14, 2012	207
33	7	"Supermodels"	Joey So	Andrew Harrison	David Baggley	January 14, 2012	207
House of Helmut: Pamplemoose has a date and needs a house sitter, so the gang volunteer, and get haunted by the ghost of his father. Supermodels: Eric is determined to have a good school picture taken.
34	8	"Eric Amazing"	Joey So	Richard Clark	Blair Kitchen	January 21, 2012	208
34	8	"Trevor the Hero"	Joey So	Mark Steinberg	Kyu-bum Lee	January 21, 2012	208
Eric Amazing: Eric switches bodies with Allan Amazing so he can be amazing. Trevor the Hero: Trevor accidentally saves Pamplemoose's life and is hailed a hero, to his and Eric's dismay.
35	9	"Eric and Trevor's Mediocre Adventure"	Joey So	Craig Martin	David Baggley	February 4, 2012	209
35	9	"The Grim Gerbil"	Joey So	David Dias	Jeff Bittle & Paul Watling	February 4, 2012	209
Eric and Trevor's Mediocre Adventure: Eric and Trevor go back in time to retake a test. The Grim Gerbil: Trevor gains the ability to talk to other animals after eating radioactive dog food.
36	10	"Gimme a Sign"	Joey So	David Dias	Blair Kitchen	February 25, 2012	210
36	10	"Sidekicks Rule!"	Joey So & Kerry Sargent	Heather Jackson	Kyu-bum Lee, Dean Outschoorn & Joey So	February 25, 2012	210
Gimme a Sign: Eric needs a signature to go on the best field trip ever. Sidekicks Rule!: The sidekicks celebrate "Sidekick Day" where they get to treat the supers like servants.
37	11	"The Land Before Grunk"	Joey So & Kerry Sargent	Mark Steinberg	David Baggley	March 3, 2012	211
37	11	"I, Sidebot"	Joey So & Kerry Sargent	Dan Williams & Lienne Sawatsky	Paul Watling	March 3, 2012	211
The Land Before Grunk: Eric accidentally unfreezes a prehistoric super villain during an archaeological field trip, who then falls in love with Kitty. I, Sidebot: Technology renders the sidekicks obsolete.
38	12	"Adventures in Supersitting"	Joey So & Kerry Sargent	Heather Jackson	Eugene McDermott	March 24, 2012	212
38	12	"Mandy-o and Eric-et"	Joey So & Kerry Sargent	Richard Clark	Blair Kitchen	March 24, 2012	212
Adventures in Supersitting: Eric and Trevor are babysitting. Mandy-o and Eric-et: No one wants Eric and Mandy hanging out together.
39	13	"Sidekick Sideshow"	Joey So	Shawn Kalb	Paul Watling	March 31, 2012	213
39	13	"The Maxum Method"	Joey So	Shawn Kalb	David Baggley	March 31, 2012	213
Sidekick Sideshow: The gang become contestants on a popular game show. The Maxum Method: Joshua Sideburns is back and he is filming a Maxum Man movie.
40	14	"Of Mouse and Mel"	Joey So	Andrew Harrison	Blair Kitchen	April 14, 2012	214
40	14	"Iron Sidechef"	Joey So	Dan Williams & Lienne Sawatsky	Jeff Bittle	April 14, 2012	214
Of Mouse and Mel: Maxum Man's brother comes for a visit. Iron Sidechef: Eric discovers he has a talent for cooking.

=== Season 3 (2013) ===
This season contains 12 episodes. This is also the final season of the series.

No. overall	No. in season	Title	Directed by	Written by	Storyboard by	Original air date	Prod. code
41	1	"Teacher's Pet"	Kerry Sargent	Sean Jara	Kerry Sargent	June 1, 2013	301
41	1	"Opossum Man!"	Kerry Sargent	Shawn Kalb	Joey So	June 1, 2013	301
Teacher's Pet: Eric has to dodge Pamplemoose if he wants to join the gang at their new school. Opossum Man!: Eric's old pal returns as a rodent.
42	2	"Black Top, Dark Matter"	Kerry Sargent	Dan Williams & Lienne Sawatsky	Don Kim, Mark Stanleigh, Ruth Ramirez & Kyu-bum Lee	June 8, 2013	302
42	2	"Master XOX Ray Vision"	Kerry Sargent	Andrew Harrison	Dave Baggley	June 8, 2013	302
Black Top, Dark Matter: Eric goes on a dangerous mission. Master XOX Ray Vision: Eric tries contact lenses.
43	3	"Oh Trevor, Where Art Thou?"	Kerry Sargent	Dan Williams & Lienne Sawatsky	Andrew Tan	June 15, 2013	303
43	3	"XOX to Be You"	Kerry Sargent	Andrew Harrison	Andrew Murray	June 15, 2013	303
Oh Trevor, Where Art Thou?: Mandy and Eric go on a camping trip, but Vana, Kitty and Trevor tag along, before they all fall into a volcano and Trevor gets lost. XOX to Be You: A day in the life of Master XOX is shown.
44	4	"Eric and the Maxum Brain Factory"	Kerry Sargent	Shawn Kalb	Dave Baggley	June 22, 2013	304
44	4	"Trip Van Twinkle Toes"	Kerry Sargent	Emer Connon	Joey So, Kerry Sargent, Kirk Jorgensen & Jeff Bittle	June 22, 2013	304
Eric and the Maxum Brain Factory: Maxum Brain returns to meet his maker. Trip Van Twinkle Toes: A dancing supervillain enslaves the town and it's up to Kitty to save them all. Note: This episode is dedicated to Robert Henry, who served as the picture editor of the series.
45	5	"Pains, Sprains and Maxum Mobiles"	Kerry Sargent	Miklos Perlus	Halya Mychaskiw & Andrew Tan	June 29, 2013	305
45	5	"Maxum Men"	Kerry Sargent	Miklos Perlus	Andrew Murray	June 29, 2013	305
Pains, Sprains and Maxum Mobiles: Eric and Trevor go for a ride in the new Maxum Mobile. Maxum Men: Maxum Brain tells the story of his secret past.
46	6	"Hullaballoo"	Kerry Sargent	Laurie Elliott	Dave Baggley	July 6, 2013	306
46	6	"For Real Estate"	Kerry Sargent	Emer Connon	Robert Walton	July 6, 2013	306
Hullaballoo: Vana challenges her older sister. For Real Estate: Eric accidentally sells the mansion to villains.
47	7	"Multikickery"	Kerry Sargent	Dan Williams & Lienne Sawatsky	Andrew Tan	July 13, 2013	307
47	7	"A XOX for Good"	Kerry Sargent	Miklos Perlus	Andrew Murray	July 13, 2013	307
Multikickery: Eric clones himself. A XOX for Good: XOX reveals a universe with good villains and bad heroes.
48	8	"The Dingalingish Patient"	Kerry Sargent	Andrew Harrison	Robert Walton	July 20, 2013	308
48	8	"Parent Teacher Night of Doom"	Kerry Sargent	Sean Jara	Dave Baggley	July 20, 2013	308
The Dingalingish Patient: A villain takes advantage of Eric's guilt. Parent Teacher Night of Doom: A sidekick's nightmare becomes true.
49	9	"Eric of the Board"	Kerry Sargent	Shawn Kalb	Andrew Tan	July 27, 2013	309
49	9	"Pamp My Ride"	Kerry Sargent	Andrew Harrison	Andrew Murray	July 27, 2013	309
Eric of the Board: Eric becomes chairman of the mansion. Pamp My Ride: Eric and Trevor customize Pamplemoose's ride.
50	10	"Oppoxox"	Kerry Sargent	Shawn Kalb	Dave Baggley	August 24, 2013	310
50	10	"Walter Ego Presents: Vapo House"	Kerry Sargent	Dan Williams & Lienne Sawatsky	Rob Walton	August 24, 2013	310
Oppoxox: Master XOX wants to be a good guy. Vapo House: The gang star on a reality show.
51	11	"The Running of the Trolls"	Kerry Sargent	Sean Jara	Andrew Murray	September 7, 2013	311
51	11	"Superbest in Show"	Kerry Sargent	David Dias	Kyle Marshall & Halya Mychaskiw	September 7, 2013	311
The Running of the Trolls: The town battles trolls. Superbest in Show: Eric and Maxum Mutt compete in a pet show.
52	12	"Those Who Can't Teach"	Kerry Sargent	David Dias	Rob Walton	September 14, 2013	312
52	12	"Graduation Daze"	Kerry Sargent	Miklos Perlus	Dave Baggley	September 14, 2013	312
Those Who Can't Teach: Professor Pamplemoose gets fired. Graduation Daze: In the series finale, it's graduation day at the Academy.
