= Aapas Ki Baat =

Aapas Ki Baat (lit. 'internal discussion', transl. internal affairs – transl. just between us) may refer to:

- Aapas Ki Baat (film), a 1981 Indian Hindi-language romantic action film by Harmesh Malhotra, starring Raj Babbar and Poonam Dhillon
- Aapas ki Baat (talk show), a Pakistani current affairs talk show hosted by Najam Sethi on Geo News

== See also ==
- Internal affairs (disambiguation)
- Just Between Us (disambiguation)
