= Sidekick (TV series) =

Canadian animated television series

- The show's title card, and featuring the characters left to right clockwise: Vana, Trevor, Eric and Kitty, with Maxum Brain in the background.
- Genre: Comedy; Action comedy; Slapstick
- Created by: Todd Kauffman; Joey So
- Directed by: Joey So (seasons 1–2); Kerry Sargent (season 3) (Note: Sargent had already directed five Season 2 episodes in a row, starting with "Sidekicks Rule!" up until "Mandy-o and Eric-et".)
- Voices of: Miklos Perlus; Christian Potenza; Denise Oliver; Stephanie Anne Mills; Ron Pardo; Tony Daniels; Patrick McKenna; Ron Rubin; Scott McCord
- Theme music composer: William Kevin Anderson
- Composers: Don Breithaupt; Anthony Vanderburgh
- Country of origin: Canada
- No. of seasons: 3
- No. of episodes: 52 (104 segments) (+5 shorts) (list of episodes)

Production
- Executive producers: Joey So; Todd Kauffman; Doug Murphy (seasons 1–2); Colin Bohm (season 3); Irene Weibel (season 3)
- Producer: Michael Décsi
- Running time: 22 minutes (2 11–minute segments)
- Production company: Nelvana

Original release
- Network: YTV
- Release: September 3, 2010 – September 14, 2013

Sidekick is a Canadian animated television series created by Todd Kauffman and Joey So for YTV, and produced by Nelvana. The series ran from September 3, 2010, to September 14, 2013, with 52 episodes produced. The series is based on the original shorts originally titled The Not-So-Superheroic Adventures of Sidekick aired as part of the 2005 TV series, Funpak.

== Premise ==
The first episode of Sidekick, comprising two stories: "Maxum Man Mark Two" and "To Party, Perchance to Party".

The series is about an orphan boy named Eric Needles, with his best friend Trevor and his two other friends, Vana and Kitty, who are training to become superhero sidekicks at the Academy for Aspiring Sidekicks (though in "Graduation Daze", supervillains can send their henchmen to the academy) in the Canadian city of Splittsboro (based on Scarborough, Toronto). While dealing with intense sidekick training, Eric must also contend with his strict guardian Maxum Brain, his grumpy teacher Professor Pamplemoose, the evil Master XOX and keeping secret of the disappearance of his superhero mentor Maxum Man from the city.

== Episodes ==
Season	Episodes	Originally released	
Season	Episodes	First released	Last released
Funpak	5	2005	
1	26	September 3, 2010	February 19, 2011
2	14	October 8, 2011	April 14, 2012
3	12	June 1, 2013	September 14, 2013

== Characters ==
=== Main ===
- Eric Needles (voiced by Miklos Perlus; Peter Oldring in the Funpak shorts) is a boy who was adopted as the sidekick to Maxum Man, the greatest superhero of all time (before he disappeared). He also has a huge crush on Vana, but he later seems to be more infatuated with Mandy Struction. He grew up in an orphanage because he has no known parents, although in the Funpak short: The Evil Trevor, Eric says that he once had a dad who spit on his face all the time until he died. He was adopted by Maxum Brain. Eric always wears a T-shirt with a skull on it (hinting at what Todd Kauffman would make after Sidekick ended production). He and Trevor always get into trouble and don't have common sense. He and his friends are often forced to clean up the messes they caused. With Maxum Man missing, Eric must do all his heroic duties to ensure the public is safe and make them think he is still on the job but unfortunately, he has no powers nor hero experience to fight the villainous threats Maxum Man faces. Luckily, he has friends to help him out and give him good and solid advice on how to handle these kinds of situations.
- Trevor Troublemeyer (voiced by Christian Potenza) is Eric's dim-witted best friend. Trevor always ropes Eric into all sorts of hijinks. His father is Master XOX but he and the others are all completely unaware of this. Like Eric, he knows that Maxum Man is missing and helps him keep it secret from the public or risk mass panic if they ever find out. He went to Sidekick Academy to become a henchman of his father.
- Kitty Ko (voiced by Denise Oliver) is a girl who, despite being a bit strange, gives the rest of the group advice, and is somewhat a good hacker and fixer. She has a huge crush on Eric and has a bit of a stalker-like obsession with him. She had a condition on two left feet as revealed in "Trip Van Twinkle Toes" and like Eric, she is an orphan as revealed in "Parent Teacher Night of Doom". In the Funpak shorts, she was voiced by Stephanie Beard. Unlike Eric and Trevor, she is unaware that Maxum Man is missing and is shocked and terrified at the thought of it. During production, Kitty was originally going to be the show's main protagonist.
- Vana Glama (voiced by Stephanie Anne Mills) is a hyper-ambitious prima donna who is not easily impressed and is extremely shallow. She often tortures Eric and hates him for no apparent reason. Despite this, Eric has a huge crush on her, often oblivious to her selfish, snobby, and more-often-than-not sour-hearted character. In the Funpak shorts, she was also voiced by Stephanie Beard. Like Kitty, she is also unaware Maxum Man is missing and shocked and terrified at the thought of it.

=== Supporting ===
- Maxum Brain (voiced by Tony Daniels) is Eric's guardian since Maxum Man is missing. He is a computer with many gadgets and acted as Maxum Man's assistant before his disappearance. He is strict about following rules, keeping the mansion clean and speaks with an East Indian accent.
- Maxum Man (voiced by Ron Pardo) is Eric's favourite superhero, before Eric became his current sidekick. After he went missing, Eric and Maxum Brain do everything for him to make it seem like he never left. It seems that Maxum Man always makes his enemies purely by accident.
- Mr. Martin Troublemeyer/Master XOX (voiced by Scott McCord/Ron Rubin) is Trevor's father. All he wants is what is best for Trevor and for him to be a good boy, which is why Trevor can't stand him. He tries to stay calm because of his short temper. The only time Trevor likes him is when he gets angry. However, when Trevor is not looking, his dad becomes the creepy, deformed supervillain known as Master XOX, the main antagonist of the series.
- Professor Pamplemoose (voiced by Patrick McKenna) is the cruel Headmaster at the Sidekick Academy and Eric's grumpy teacher, Pamplemoose is a strict disciplinarian who runs the school like it was a prison camp. He has devoted his life to turning worthless students into worthless Sidekicks. He often punishes Eric for obvious reasons, resulting in him getting sent to detention.

=== Recurring ===
- Golly Gee Kid (voiced by Ron Pederson) was Maxum Man's sidekick in the old days, often seen in Maxum Man's Sidekick Academy training films. While a sidekick, it seemed his primary job was performing chores around the mansion. He is now the school's janitor.
- Mandy Struction (voiced by Stacey DePass) is a teenage student at the henchman school (though she would later become an anti-hero in later episodes) and Eric's new crush. She has seismic boots that can cause tremors in the floor whenever she stomps down. She is much taller than the other kids, suggesting she might be older than them. She also has a crush on Eric, so Kitty (used to) hate her.
- Allan Amazing (voiced by Scott McCord) is a handsome student of Hispanic origin who is popular with female students. Although he acts nice and sensible, he is a narcissist who will do anything to beat anyone, especially Eric, who he has an immense hatred for. He is interested in Vana as well.
- Kid Ruthless (voiced by Carter Hayden) is a big tough student who seems to be a bully, as he tortures Eric for stealing his Sidekick Identity Name. He was popular with the students for his music. He was nice to Eric after the latter defeated him in a DJ battle.
- Mayor Swifty (voiced by John Stocker) is the senior mayor of Splittsboro. All he wants to do is to see Maxum Man, which happened once in "Ain't No Party Like a Maxum Brain Party". He also initially has a hatred for a temporarily fired superhero, Static Clint, as shown in "The Spark is Gone", though it seems to have disappeared after this episode.
- Maxum Mom (voiced by Ellen-Ray Hennessy) is Maxum Man's mother, who has an intense dislike for Master XOX. She is tough like her son and has visited and cared for Eric a couple of times in the Maxum Mansion. She appears in episodes like "Maxum Mom", "Shopping Spree", and "Family Fun Day". Eric posed as her in the episode "The Maxum Switcheroo" to expose the fake Maxum Man.
- Maxum Mel (voiced by Ron Pardo) is Maxum Man's older brother. He is tough like his brother and visited the Maxum Mansion one time. He has a sidekick named Mouse Boy.
- Joshua Sideburns (voiced by Fab Filippo) is a movie star with whom Kitty is obsessed. He visits Splittsboro to act in upcoming movies.
- Opossum Man (voiced by Tony Daniels) is another superhero in Splittsboro who is a parody of Batman and always wants to make crime and criminals play dead as real opossums do. He also has a sidekick named Boy Vermin.
- Glenn/Boy Vermin (voiced by Deven Mack) is Eric's old friend from the orphanage and Opossum Man's sidekick dressed as a rodent who is a parody of Robin and always assists Opossum Man.

== Broadcast ==
In the United States, the series premiered on Cartoon Network alongside Almost Naked Animals on June 13, 2011, until October 15, 2012. The series also aired on Qubo from March 27, 2017, until August 24, 2019. However, it returned on April 4, 2020, but left the schedule once again on July 25, 2020.

In Australia and New Zealand, the series premiered on ABC3 (now ABC Entertains). It later aired on Network Ten on November 23, 2011 and on Disney XD on April 9, 2015. It also aired on Cartoon Network.

In the UK, the series premiered on CBBC on September 1, 2014.

The series is streaming on Amazon Prime Video, Pluto TV, and Tubi.
