= Student Bodies (TV series) =

- Created by: Michael Klinghoffer & Judy Spencer and Alan Silberberg
- Starring: Jamie Elman; Miklos Perlus; Nicole Lyn; Ross Hull; Katie Emme McIninch; Jessica Goldapple; Mark Taylor
- Countries of origin: Canada; United States
- No. of seasons: 3
- No. of episodes: 65

Production
- Camera setup: Single-camera
- Running time: 26 minutes
- Production companies: Telescene; 20th Television; Sunbow Entertainment

Original release
- Network: YTV (First-run syndication); Global; Showcase
- Release: January 10, 1997 – November 16, 1999

Student Bodies is a teen sitcom that was produced in Montreal from 1997 to 1999. While a live-action series, animations are used throughout as thoughts and imaginations. The segments are comical, bizarre and sometimes dark.

Though the show enjoyed much bigger success in Canada, the show was originally made for the American market under the distribution of 20th Television and aired on many Fox affiliated stations during the 1997-1998 and 1998–1999 seasons, as well as a brief return during the winter of 2000. The show aired in Canada on Global and YTV. It has been called "an imitation of Saved by the Bell" by critics, and featured an ensemble cast of high school students at Thomas A. Edison High School. As of 2018, the show aired in reruns on ABC Spark.

== Characters ==
Cody Anthony Miller (Jamie Elman), the protagonist of the show, was the cartoonist for the high school newspaper publication of the same name as the show, which rivaled the official school paper led by Victor Kane (Miklos Perlus). In the first season, Cody had an ongoing rivalry with Victor, the weaselly editor of the Student Voice, but they became friends after the staff of the "Student Voice" joined "Student Bodies".

The audience regularly saw his thoughts on the show's current situation in the form of his cartoons, a technique that has been used on other shows such as Lizzie McGuire. His cartoons were also often used as scene and location transitions, as a continuation of the current live scene, and in the opening and closing sequences. Another main source of Cody's cartoon drawings were his relationships with his girlfriends throughout the series, who included "Student Bodies" editor Emily Roberts (Nicole Lyn) and fellow member Grace Vasquez (Victoria Sanchez), and other characters including "transition" girlfriend Holly Benson (Katheryn Winnick) and Kim McCloud (Jennifer Finnigan), who became a main character in the third season.

Others in the cast included Erin Simms, who played Morgan McKnight in the first season and was the object of Chris Sheppard's (Ross Hull) infatuation, before he and Margaret "Mags" Abernathy (Katie Emme McIninch) became a couple on the show. Jessica Goldapple played Francesca "Flash" Albright, the photographer loyal to Victor Kane (Miklos Perlus) and Mark Taylor played Romeo Carter, who became Emily's boyfriend after Cody and Emily broke up. Romeo and Emily break up near the end of the show's final season. Staff at Edison High included vice-principal Mrs. Morton, played by Michelle Sweeney.

== Trivia ==
- The show was produced in Montreal despite being initially recorded and broadcast in English, was French dubbed entirely in France and broadcast, re-titled Vice-Versa, on Canal Famille (now Vrak) in Quebec.
- The show's opening theme song (as well as the opening credits sequence) changed after the first seasons, to a pop rock-style theme song. This new theme song remained until the end of the series.
- The show was shot at the site of a then moved primary school (formerly of École Saint-Gabriel-Lalemant) at Rue Louis-Hémon/Rue des Écores in Rosemont–La Petite-Patrie in Montreal, which is now an adult education centre (Centre Marie-Médiatrice).
- Co-creator Alan Silberberg designed the animated segments.

== Cast ==
- Jamie Elman as Cody Anthony Miller
- Miklos Perlus as Victor Kane
- Nicole Lyn as Emily Roberts
- Ross Hull as Chris Sheppard
- Katie Emme McIninch as Margaret 'Mags' Abernathy
- Jessica Goldapple as Francesca 'Flash' Albright
- Mark Taylor as Romeo Carter
- Erin Simms as Morgan McKnight (Season 1)
- Victoria Sanchez as Grace Vasquez (Season 1–2)
- Jennifer Finnigan as Kim McCloud (Season 3)
- Michelle Sweeney as Mrs. Morton (Recurring)

== Episodes ==
=== Season 1 (1997–1998) ===
1. Disco Cody
2. Monsieur Cody
3. The Bully
4. Date With Morgan
5. All Hallow's Eve
6. Scheming Victor
7. Mags' Dark Side
8. Cody For President
9. Tutor's Pet
10. The Holiday Show
11. Time Capsule
12. Mags' Birthday
13. Cyrano De Edison
14. Goop
15. Victor In Love
16. Valentine's Day
17. Date-A-Rama
18. Secret Admirer
19. Mags' Rags
20. Career Day
21. Secret Weapon
22. Flash
23. Cody Presley
24. Bad Girl Emily
25. Grounded For Life
26. Tanya

=== Season 2 (1998–1999) ===
1. The Trial
2. A New Beginning
3. The Waitress
4. The Road Trip
5. Cody Moves In
6. Dating Game
7. A Perfect Mags
8. The Boys of Edison
9. Permission
10. Boss Cody
11. New Year's Eve
12. The Holdup
13. The Game Show
14. The Teacher
15. Snowed In
16. Babe Magnet
17. Victor Moves In
18. Double Date
19. Goodbye Grace
20. The Test
21. Detention
22. Cheer Up, Cody
23. The T-shirt
24. Gay Friend
25. New Friends (aka New Guys)
26. Stand-Up Chris

=== Season 3 (1999–2000) ===
(An * indicates the episode did not air in the US.)

1. The Junior Prom*
2. The Blow-Up
3. Dead Men Don't Go To Edison*
4. Kiss and Tell*
5. After High School
6. Romeo Hurts His Knee (aka Romeo's Wounded Knee)*
7. Time to Try
8. Victor Gets Drunk
9. Chris' Death*
10. Romeo's Old Friend*
11. The Break-Up
12. The Reunion
13. The Triangle

== International broadcast ==
In Israel, the show was broadcast on Arutz HaYeladim.

In the Dominican Republic, it was broadcast on Telesistema 11, as part of their Saturday morning block.

In South Africa, it was shown on SABC in the afternoon viewing schedule.
