= Erin Simms =

Canadian actress, screenwriter and producer

Erin Simms (born December 18, 1976) is a Canadian actress, screenwriter, and producer known for her role in Student Bodies. Since retiring from acting in 2013, Simms has written and produced such films as A Walk in the Woods, Our Souls at Night, and Book Club.

== Early life ==
Simms was born in Montreal and attended St. George's School of Montreal.

== Career ==
Simms' first acting roles were in the 1995 television film Zoya and in an episode of Are You Afraid of the Dark?. Simms starred in the late-1990s sitcom Student Bodies before leaving the show to become the Yellow Galaxy Power Ranger in Power Rangers Lost Galaxy. After beginning production, Simms was replaced by Cerina Vincent. Simms appeared in several films and television series before 2013. Since then, she has worked as a producer and screenwriter.

== Filmography ==
=== Film ===
Year	Title	Role	Notes
1996	Silent Trigger	Refugee	
1997	Snowboard Academy	Katy	
1999	Ladies Room	Hair Spray Girl	
2011	The Howling: Reborn	Woman Driver	Uncredited
2012	The Possession	Possessed Italian Girl	
2012	The Company You Keep	New York Hotel Clerk	
2013	Long Gone Day	Chloe	

=== Television ===
Year	Title	Role	Notes
1995	Zoya	Bunny	Television film
1996	Are You Afraid of the Dark?	Sue	Episode: "The Tale of the Vacant Lot"
1997–1999	Student Bodies	Morgan McKnight	28 episodes
1998	Soldier of Fortune, Inc.	Woman Customer	Episode: "Hide and Seek"
2000	One World	Maggie	Episode: "Dad Strikes Out"
2000	Foreign Objects	Nikki	Episode: "Celebrity"
2002	Odyssey 5	Stacia	Episode: "Pilot"
2005	Crimes of Passion	Kathy	Television film
2007	A Life Interrupted	Woman at grocery store	Television film
2009	Degrassi: The Next Generation	Stacie	2 episodes
2011	Wandering Eye	Hostess	Television film
2011	Fringe	Kim Kimball	Episode: "6B"
2011	The Pastor's Wife	Woman Reporter	Television film
2012	Eureka	Young Scientist	Episode: "Smarter Carter"
