= Bill Holderman =

American filmmaker

Bill Holderman is an American film director, screenwriter and film producer. He made his feature directorial debut with Book Club (2018).

Holderman was born in Chicago, graduated from Lyons Township High School and attended Northwestern University. As of May 2023, Holderman resides in Boulder, Colorado.

== Filmography ==
Year	Title	Director	Writer	Producer
2007	Lions for Lambs	No	No	Yes
2010	The Conspirator	No	No	Yes
2012	The Company You Keep	No	No	Yes
2015	A Walk in the Woods	No	Yes	Yes
2018	What They Had	No	No	Yes
2018	The Old Man & the Gun	No	No	Yes
2018	Book Club	Yes	Yes	Yes
2023	Book Club: The Next Chapter	Yes	Yes	Yes
