= Dragnet (1967 TV series) season 3 =

Dragnet
- Season 3
- No. of episodes: 27

Release
- Original network: NBC
- Original release: September 19, 1968 – April 17, 1969

Season chronology
- ← Previous; Season 2 Next → Season 4

This is a list of episodes from the third season of the 1967 Dragnet series. The season was directed by Jack Webb.

== Broadcast history ==
The season originally aired Thursday at 9:30-10:00 pm (EST).

== DVD release ==
The DVD was released by Shout! Factory.

== Episodes ==
No. overall	No. in season	Title	Written by	Original release date
46	1	"Public Affairs (DR-07)"	Burt Prelutsky	September 19, 1968
Friday and Gannon are invited to appear on a television show to debate police issues with a social professor and a hippie activist. Howard Hesseman guest stars as the hippie activist (credited as "Don Sturdy", which he used as his on-air name when employed as a radio DJ).
47	2	"Juvenile (DR-05)"	Robert C. Dennis	September 26, 1968
Friday and Gannon act as the night watch commanders for the juvenile division. They encounter several unusual incidents, including a runaway from New York City, an abandoned baby in Dorothy Miller's care and a high Buddhist.
48	3	"Community Relations (DR-10)"	Alf Harris	October 3, 1968
Friday and Gannon attempt to recruit minority candidates from a community-centered sponsored job development group. They seek African-American Officer Dave Evans to help them, as many of the group members know and respect him. But when Evans' house is attacked for his job and race, he considers retirement, citing a lack of respect from anyone, and the community group loses interest. Evans eventually changes his mind when he defuses a potentially inflammatory incident between a black man and a white man without assistance or having to arrest anyone, and is thanked by bystanders; the community group regains interest, and 90% of the applicants are hired by the LAPD. O. J. Simpson appears (uncredited) as one of the job developer group.
49	4	"Management Services (DR-11)"	James Doherty	October 10, 1968
In the aftermath of the assassination of Dr. Martin Luther King Jr., Friday and Gannon are assigned to the department's Emergency Control Center, as the LAPD attempts to calm the public.
50	5	"Police Commission (DR-13)"	Robert I. Holt	October 17, 1968
Friday and Gannon crack down on "wildcatters", freelance tow truck drivers who victimize motorists.
51	6	"Homicide (DR-06)"	Robert C. Dennis	October 24, 1968
Friday hosts a dinner party at his apartment, providing insight into the nature of a bachelor officer's private life.
52	7	"Robbery (DR-15)"	James Doherty	November 7, 1968
Friday and Gannon are on day watch, robbery division desk duty. As in other desk duty episodes, we see a variety of the activities which the division undertakes during a typical shift. This time they show us a worrisome stakeout replete with radio breakdowns, tailing suspects, a truck hijacking, various people with mental issues, a career criminal who wears an Army jacket and causes Friday to lose his cool, a bank robbery netting $50,000 and a charge of felony murder, and a teenage hero who jogs, among other events. William Boyett, "Sgt. MacDonald" from Adam-12, guest-stars as "Sgt. Bill Pailing".
53	8	"Public Affairs (DR-12)"	Jerry Cohen and James Doherty	November 14, 1968
Friday and Gannon assist the Secret Service with preparations for a visit to Los Angeles by the President of the United States.
54	9	"Training (DR-18)"	Robert C. Dennis	November 21, 1968
A female magazine writer is doing a story about female cadets at the police academy. Her chosen subject for the story is a fledgling policewoman, whom Friday helps deal with her unsupportive boyfriend.
55	10	"Public Affairs (DR-14)"	Alf Harris	November 28, 1968
Friday and Gannon work with store owners to prevent crime in the area, despite the obstinacy of some of them.
56	11	"Narcotics (DR-16)"	Burt Prelutsky	December 5, 1968
After a teenage boy has a bad LSD trip, a local businessman presents a novel new idea to the LAPD: assist teenagers in selling the other side of the drug trade, not using. NOTE: This is a dramatized telling of the creation of the SmartTeens program.
57	12	"Internal Affairs (DR-20)"	James Doherty	December 12, 1968
Friday and Gannon investigate an officer accused of police brutality after a drunk driving arrest. Officers Pete Malloy (Martin Milner) and Jim Reed (Kent McCord), the main characters of Adam-12, appear as witnesses regarding the incident. Note: This episode was filmed on the Adam-12 stationhouse set.
58	13	"Community Relations (DR-17)"	Alf Harris	January 2, 1969
Friday and Gannon attend an LAPD retreat on improving community relationships at a Lake Arrowhead conference center owned by the University of California. Participants end up coming up with ideas and learning about themselves.
59	14	"Homicide (DR-22)"	James Doherty	January 9, 1969
Friday and Gannon investigate the murder of a woman in her own apartment. The apartment manager, Calvin Lampe (Burt Mustin) seems to know facts about the case before either Friday or Gannon. His palm print is on a recently painted wall close to the murder and he seems to have an answer for every question proposed by Friday or Gannon. They take him downtown to take his statement, ask him additional questions, and end up breaking the case when their superior recognizes Lampe as a retired distinguished Chicago PD detective.
60	15	"B.O.D. (DR-27)"	James Doherty	January 23, 1969
Friday and Gannon work in the Los Angeles Business Office covering various situations. Like "Juvenile (DR-05)", the detectives handle multiple unusual incidents, though generally more serious, such as reports of an incoming tidal wave from Japan due to hit in eight hours, a diabetic needing medical treatment, peaceful protesters who disrupt the BOD, a person who threatens to commit suicide because he believes extraterrestrials are after him, a lost boy, and an officer getting shot on duty. Grant Williams as Father Barnes
61	16	"Narcotics (DR-21)"	Burt Prelutsky	January 30, 1969
Friday, Gannon, and Captain Al Trembly create a new idea to find marijuana at the Los Angeles International Airport: Ginger, the first marijuana-sniffing dog.
62	17	"Administrative Vice (DR-29)"	James Doherty	February 6, 1969
While Gannon is out sick (because Harry Morgan was sick in real life), Friday gets a temporary partner. His new partner (Anthony Eisley) is a police lieutenant from Century City Administrative Vice who sets Friday up and offers him a bribe. Harry Morgan appears only briefly at the end of this episode.
63	18	"The Joy Riders"	Preston Wood	February 13, 1969
17-year-old Hal Rustin (Michael Burns) is a car thief whose mother Eunice Rustin (Peggy Webber) is helpless to stop him. He is given a tour of the jail in an attempt to impress him of the consequences for choosing crime. But it doesn't work, and he later kills someone with a shotgun. Note: Harry Morgan had a bloody nose the night before filming. This episode was originally scheduled to be the final episode of the second season, to be aired on April 4, 1968. However, NBC coverage of the assassination of Martin Luther King Jr. preempted the program.
64	19	"Frauds (DR-28)"	Burt Prelutsky	February 20, 1969
A computer puts Sgt. Friday and Officer Gannon on the trail of an embezzlement ring that involves "master of disguise" Paul Nichols (John Gilgreen) and his girlfriend Peggy Sue Thompson. Landlady Elvira Norton (Florence Lake) helps capture the culprits.
65	20	"Juvenile (DR-19)"	Robert C. Dennis and James Doherty	February 27, 1969
Friday and Gannon investigate the disappearance of a nine-year-old boy from school. They discover the boy hiding from people, and after taking him to the hospital, find that he has been viciously flogged.
66	21	"Burglary (DR-31)"	Burt Prelutsky	March 6, 1969
A costumed thief calling himself "The Crimson Crusader" has been stealing comic books, movie posters and publicity photos of various superheroes.
67	22	"Vice (DR-30)"	James Doherty	March 13, 1969
Friday and Gannon go undercover at a hotel to find the location of an illegal gambling operation. Soon after spreading the word they're looking for some action, they're driven to a late-night game in the Hollywood Hills. After the game the detectives give the location of the residence to their boss, and a raid is set for the following night. At the end Friday explains to a surprised female accomplice how her boss had been cheating with a deck of marked cards.
68	23	"Forgery (DR-33)"	Burt Prelutsky	March 20, 1969
Friday and Gannon investigate the theft of payroll checks, as well as the driver's license and credit cards of an employee, from Monument Studios. The detectives are led to the various homes of hippies, and are helped by a hippie (Gary Crosby) who may have ulterior motives.
69	24	"Juvenile (DR-32)"	Jack E. Barrett and James Doherty	March 27, 1969
Friday and Gannon get help from the California Highway Patrol in searching for two dogs which have bitten a child. The child is allergic to the anti-rabies serum and is scheduled to get a shot that may kill her unless proof is found that the dogs are not rabid.
70	25	"Juvenile (DR-35)"	Burt Prelutsky	April 3, 1969
When a four-day-old baby is found barely alive in an apartment trash receptacle, Friday and Gannon search for the person who abandoned the newborn. Their investigation turns up information from a young man who knew a buddy now in the Army who'd boasted he'd impregnated his girlfriend before being shipped overseas.
71	26	"Frauds (DR-36)"	James Doherty	April 10, 1969
During a routine audit, a local department store discovers the loss of at least $100,000 (about $876,000 in 2025 dollars). Friday and Gannon begin by understanding how the department store handles its credit card department. A pair of supervisors in the credit department may be involved, but both of them have suddenly disappeared after being initially questioned.
72	27	"Intelligence (DR-34)"	James Doherty	April 17, 1969
An old night-school friend with political aspirations invites Friday to an alumni meeting at his home. Friday discovers he is being considered for membership in a militia; Friday declines, but the friend seeks Friday's help in acquiring a Federal Weapons License. Friday uses the job to locate the militia's stash of stolen government weapons and explosives.
