= Dragnet (1967 TV series) season 4 =

Dragnet
- Season 4
- No. of episodes: 26

Release
- Original network: NBC
- Original release: September 18, 1969 – April 16, 1970

Season chronology
- ← Previous; Season 3

This is a list of episodes from the fourth and final season of the 1967 Dragnet series. The season was directed by Jack Webb.

== Broadcast history ==
The season originally aired Thursday at 9:30–10:00 p.m. (EST).

== DVD release ==
The DVD was released by Shout! Factory.

== Episodes ==
No. overall	No. in season	Title	Written by	Original release date
73	1	"Personnel – The Shooting"	Michael Donovan	September 18, 1969
Friday and Gannon investigate the robbery of a liquor store that resulted in two officers shot. Friday and Gannon stay with the families, making their time easier, and deal with the outcome once the waiting is over.
74	2	"Homicide – The Student"	Jack Smith	September 25, 1969
Friday and Gannon go after a college student for a double homicide committed with a rifle.
75	3	"S.I.U. – The Ring"	Robert C. Dennis	October 2, 1969
Friday and Gannon, using an informant's "friendly tip," recruit a policewoman to nab a burglar and uncover $25,000 in stolen jewelry from a protected location. S.I.U. is Special Investigation Unit.
76	4	"D.H.Q. – Medical"	Robert C. Dennis	October 9, 1969
Friday and Gannon investigate cases in a hospital emergency ward, including an unbalanced man threatening to shoot a radio talk show host. Cyril Delevanti appears as perennial nuisance Basil Jennings. D.H.Q. is Detective Headquarters.
77	5	"Burglary – Mister"	Burt Prelutsky	October 16, 1969
Friday and Gannon investigate a home burglary where everything is missing, even a blind woman's cane. The case leads them to a plethora of thefts and other crimes committed by an insufferable man who insists he be called "Mister" by anyone associated with him.
78	6	"Juvenile – The Little Pusher"	James Doherty	October 23, 1969
Friday and Gannon investigate the drug overdose of a 12-year-old seventh-grader. The trail leads to a history class, a hippie's boarding house, and death.
79	7	"Homicide – Cigarette Butt"	Alf Harris	October 30, 1969
Self-defense or murder one? The title object plays a key part in determining which occurred when a man shot his girlfriend's lover during an argument.
80	8	"D.H.Q. – Missing Person"	Alf Harris	November 13, 1969
A local high school student goes missing after being called to the vice principal's office to receive an honor. The student had not missed any days of school or been late, which worries the vice principal; she calls the police, who in turn have Friday and Gannon visit her. The case takes Friday and Gannon to a fashion salon, an apartment complex, a friend's home, an optometrist's office, a restaurant, a psychiatrist's office, and finally to the home of the missing person's mother.
81	9	"Burglary Auto – Courtroom"	Jack Barrett	November 20, 1969
Friday and Gannon testify in court against three burglary suspects, but their case is in jeopardy over technicalities, a slick-talking lawyer, and the temporary delay of the state's key witness in appearance.
82	10	"Internal Affairs – Parolee"	Michael Donovan	November 27, 1969
Friday and Gannon retrace a 14-year-old investigation to determine whether charges can be brought against a man up for parole, an investigation that takes a decisive turn when a businessman who had employed the suspect makes a startling admission about the original crime.
83	11	"Burglary Auto – Juvenile Genius"	Michael Donovan	December 4, 1969
Friday and Gannon track down thieves responsible for a series of Los Angeles robberies, all involving a red cloth with an "X" marked on it. Their investigation leads them to unusual burglars and the most unlikely of criminal masterminds.
84	12	"Bunco – $9,000"	Don Kilburn	December 11, 1969
The search is on for a swindler who conned an old vaudevillian out of $9,000 he found on a sidewalk.
85	13	"Narco – Missing Hype"	Michael Donovan	January 8, 1970
This episode focuses on drugs, paying particular attention to addiction symptoms. Friday and Gannon take a special interest in a young addict whom Friday saved from an OD when the addict was 16 years old. The young man has been out of rehab for six months and looks to be using again. Friday wants to get to him before it gets worse or he turns up dead.
86	14	"Burglary – Helpful Woman"	Michael Donovan	January 22, 1970
Friday and Gannon track down a female thief who specializes in elderly people.
87	15	"Homicide – Who Killed Who?"	Michael Donovan	January 29, 1970
Friday and Gannon investigate a multiple homicide shooting that left four people dead.
88	16	"Burglary – The Son"	Robert C. Dennis	February 5, 1970
Friday and Gannon track goods stolen from an upper middle class home through several sources to find the burglar.
89	17	"A.I.D. – The Weekend"	Richard Morgan	February 12, 1970
Friday and Gannon spend the weekend together at Bill's home in Eagle Rock. A magazine saleswoman stops by, as suggested by one of Bill's neighbors. At the end of the episode, the "magazine saleswoman" is arrested for fraud. A.I.D. is Accident Investigation Division.
90	18	"Narco – Pill Maker"	Alf Harris	February 19, 1970
Friday and Gannon, attempting to stop the supply of amphetamine sulfate pills into the area, discover that a factory to make the pills has been set up in a leased residence. They arrest the hired help but still face a race against time to connect the head of the operation to the crime before the hired help pleads guilty.
91	19	"Burglary – The Dognappers"	Michael Donovan	February 26, 1970
Brought to their attention by a member of the Department of Animal Regulation, and with an okay from the Captain, Friday and Gannon investigate a rash of reports of lost dogs from a shopping center. Since only one lost dog had been previously reported from the same area, Friday and Gannon suspect criminal activity.
92	20	"Missing Persons – The Body"	Robert C. Dennis	March 5, 1970
Friday and Gannon spend this episode trying to track down the identity of Jane Doe #37. A ring is about all they have to go on. Anthony Eisley and Luana Patten guest star.
93	21	"Forgery – The Ranger"	Don Kilburn	March 12, 1970
A forest ranger is brought in when checks and credit cards bearing other names than his own are found in his possession after he is stopped for a traffic violation. Even though he seems to be knowledgeable on the subject of forestry, his answers about the cards and checks lead Friday and Gannon to suspect he is a thief just posing as a ranger.
94	22	"D.H.Q. – Night School"	Dick Morgan	March 19, 1970
Friday arrests a fellow student for possession of marijuana after their night school class; this incurs the wrath of Professor Grant, who expels Friday after a vote among the other students at their next meeting. Friday demands a chance to plead his case to the students before a second vote is taken; Grant says he must garner 2/3 of the votes to be reinstated, until one of the other students objects to Grant's tactics.
95	23	"I.A.D. – The Receipt"	Michael Donovan	March 26, 1970
Friday and Gannon investigate two homicide detectives whom a caretaker is accusing of stealing $800 from a dead man's funeral money, leaving only $200 to bury him. I.A.D. is Internal Affairs Division.
96	24	"Robbery – The Harassing Wife"	Alf Harris	April 2, 1970
As Friday and Gannon investigate a series of robberies, a vindictive woman, Jean Sawyer (Peggy Webber), makes a pest of herself by calling headquarters repeatedly to accuse her husband John (Herb Ellis) of the thefts. The detectives investigate John Sawyer and find no evidence against him, but the man responsible for three of the robberies is found and arrested. When a fourth robbery occurs, Mrs. Sawyer again accuses her husband. Is she "crying wolf" again?
97	25	"Burglary – Baseball"	Robert C. Dennis	April 9, 1970
Friday and Gannon investigate a safecracking job worth $1,900 and discover an interesting springtime motive.
98	26	"D.H.Q. – The Victims"	Michael Donovan	April 16, 1970
Friday and Gannon are working the night watch out of the Detective Headquarters, Field Investigative Section. They show a new cop the importance of field officers and the pain of the victims and their friends. The plot lines include two robbery/murders, a purse snatching, and the robbery of a man who lost all his money.
