= Metallothionein 1A =

Protein found in humans

MT1A
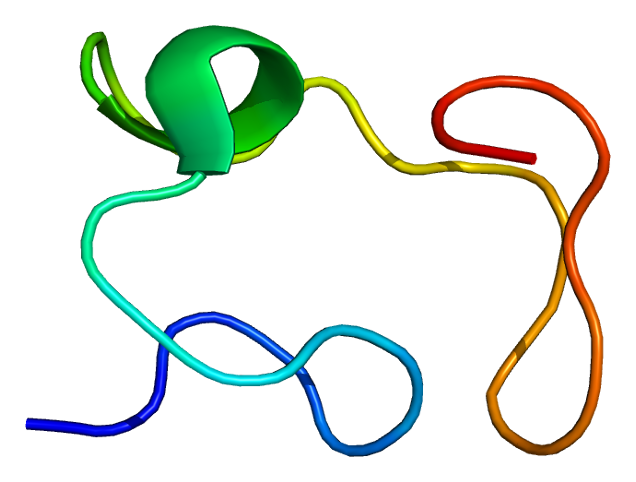

Identifiers
- Aliases: MT1A, MT1, MT1S, MTC, Metallothionein 1A, MT-1A, MT-IA
- External IDs: OMIM: 156350; GeneCards: MT1A; OMA:MT1A - orthologs

Gene location (Human)
Chr.	Chromosome 16 (human)
Band	16q13	Start	56,638,666 bp
Band	16q13	End	56,640,087 bp
RNA expression pattern
Bgee	Human / Mouse (ortholog); Top expressed in: synovial membrane; middle frontal gyrus; epithelium of bronchus; metanephric glomerulus; spinal ganglia; thalamus; trachea; paraflocculus of cerebellum; frontal pole; vastus lateralis muscle / n/a; More reference expression data
BioGPS	n/a
Gene ontology
Molecular function	zinc ion binding; protein binding; metal ion binding
Cellular component	cytoplasm; perinuclear region of cytoplasm; cytosol; nucleus
Biological process	response to metal ion; negative regulation of growth; cellular response to cadmium ion; cellular response to zinc ion; cellular zinc ion homeostasis; detoxification of copper ion; cellular response to copper ion
Sources:Amigo / QuickGO
Orthologs
Species	Human	Mouse
Entrez	4489	n/a
Ensembl	ENSG00000205362	n/a
UniProt	P04731	n/a
RefSeq (mRNA)	NM_005946	n/a
RefSeq (protein)	NP_005937	n/a
Location (UCSC)	Chr 16: 56.64 – 56.64 Mb	n/a
PubMed search		n/a
- Wikidata
View/Edit Human

Metallothionein-1A is a protein that in humans is encoded by the MT1A gene.
