= Miklos Perlus =

Canadian actor (born 1977)

- Born: March 23, 1977 (age 49); Toronto, Ontario, Canada
- Other name: Mik Perlus
- Occupations: Actor; writer; story editor
- Years active: 1988–present

Miklos Perlus (born March 23, 1977) is a Canadian actor, writer, and story editor. Perlus has appeared on Canadian series Student Bodies, Road to Avonlea and Sidekick. He has written for Degrassi: The Next Generation and other series. He has also worked in television program development for several organizations.

== Biography ==
Perlus was born in Toronto, Ontario, Canada. He attended McGill University, where he studied Cultural Studies.

Perlus played Victor Kane on Student Bodies, and Peter Craig on Road to Avonlea. Perlus' experience has included a variety of roles in media as a writer, a story editor and he has developed several television productions. He also wrote and co-developed CTV's Instant Star, and served as a writer and story editor for Degrassi: The Next Generation. He was the co-winner of a Writers Guild of Canada award (shared with James Hurst) for an episode of Degrassi.

In 2008, Perlus became Marblemedia's Director of Content Development, where he was responsible for creating, sourcing and developing innovative multi-platform content and bringing them to fruition for television and digital media. In 2010, he became the voice of Eric for the YTV animated series, Sidekick. From 2014 to 2016, he served as Vice President, Kids and Family at Marblemedia. In 2016, Perlus created and executive produced a live-action family comedy for preschoolers called Opie's Home. In 2017, he joined the animated series Nina's World (PBS Kids Sprout) as supervising producer, after which he joined Pipeline Studios to write and produce Doggy World for Disney Channel Latin America and to write for Elinor Wonders Why and Alma's Way for PBS, the latter of which earned him an Emmy nomination for best writing. In 2021, Perlus joined Moonbug Entertainment as creative producer on the preschool series Cocomelon for Netflix. He also joined WildBrain as creative producer on the reboot of Caillou, producing five CG animated specials and 52 episodes of the series for Peacock.

In 2022, Perlus released an EP of original music called "Ragged Islands" as well as a single called "Joanna”, about his wife.

== Filmography ==
=== Film ===
Year	Title	Role	Notes
1995	Iron Eagle on the Attack	New Kid	
2000	Lion of Oz	Sunbeam (voice)	
2001	Nowhere in Sight	Sean Finley	
2002	Expecting	Movie star	

=== Television ===
Year	Title	Role	Notes
1988	Katts and Dog		Episode: "Hear No Evil, Speak No Evil"
1990–92	Road to Avonlea	Peter Craig	Recurring role
1991	E.N.G.	Jimmy	Episode: "Ways and Means"
1994	Tales from the Cryptkeeper	Vince (voice)	Episode: "Game Over"
1994–96	Highlander: The Animated Series	Quentin MacLeod (voice)	Main role
1995	Ready or Not	Jamie	Episode: "Just Friends"
1997–00	Student Bodies	Victor Kane	Main role
1998–99	Jim Button	Jim Button (voice)	Main role
2001	Inside the Osmonds	Jay Osmond	TV film
2001	Vampire High	Derek	Episode: "The Summoning"
2003	Air Master	(voice, English version)	TV series
2006	Instant Star	Brad	Episode: "No Sleep 'Til Brooklyn: Part 1"
2010	Cyberchase	Jules (voice)	Episode: "The Hacker's Challenge"
2010–13	Sidekick	Eric Needles (voice)	Main role, also wrote a few episodes

== Other work ==
Year	Title	Notes
2002	The Legend of Razorback	Second assistant director
2004–05	Degrassi: The Next Generation	Junior story editor (17 episodes), writer (5 episodes)
2005–08	Instant Star	Developer (7 episodes)
2011–12	Splatalot!	Developer (26 episodes)
2014	Hi Opie!	Developer (39 episodes), writer (9 episodes), associate producer
2015	Open Heart	Developer (12 episodes)
2017	Opie's Home	Writer (6 episodes)
