= Internal =

Internal may refer to:

- Internality as a concept in behavioural economics
- Neijia, internal styles of Chinese martial arts
- Neigong or "internal skills", a type of exercise in meditation associated with Daoism
- Internal (album) by Safia, 2016

== See also ==
- Internals (disambiguation)
- External (disambiguation)
