= Directorate for Internal Affairs (Jewish Autonomous Oblast) =

Управление Министерство внутренних дел по Еврейской автономной области Interior Directorate of the Jewish Autonomous Oblast
- Abbreviation: УМВД России по ЕАО
- Motto: служа закону, Служим народу by serving the law, we serve the people

Jurisdictional structure
- Operations jurisdiction: RUS
- Governing body: MVD
- General nature: Local civilian police

Operational structure
- Headquarters: Birobidzhan
- Elected officer responsible: Vasiliy Oleynick, Head of police in Jewish Autonomous Oblast
- Parent agency: MVD
- Child agency: Politsiya

Website
- Official Site

Directorate for Internal Affairs of Jewish Autonomous Oblast (Управление Министерство внутренних дел по Еврейской автономной области) is the official name of the Jewish Autonomous Oblast's Police. Established shortly after the formation of Jewish Autonomous Oblast in 1930. The headquarters is located in Birobidzhan.

Subordinated directly to the Russian Interior Ministry and the Governor of Jewish Autonomous Oblast. Current chief of police is Vasiliy Oleynick (Since June 2005).

== History ==
The Police of The Birobidzhan National Region (Управление милиции Биробиджанского национального района) was located in the beginning in Partizan (today Lenin) Street.

On May 7, 1931 the region was renamed to Jewish Autonomous Oblast and in the same year the police was called the Oblast Militsiya. The militsiya included the Birobidzhan City Police Department (Биробиджанское городское отделение) and other regional police as Birsk Police (today Obluchen police), Blyukher (today Leninsk) Police, Stalin (today October) region police and Nekrasov (today Smidov) police.

In 1991 the police in Jewish autonomous oblast (УМВД России по Еврейской автономной области) became as territorial police, according to the Declaration of Sovereignty by Superior Council of the Russian SFSR on the judicial status of the oblast under the Khabarovsk Krai.

== Chief of Police ==
=== Oblast Militsiya ===
- A. Kuznetsov (1930-1932)
- A. Khilkevich (1932-1934)
- A. Potsenko (1934-1935)
- A. Sherstnev (1935-1937)
- S. Rokhlin (1937-1938)
- I. Serdyuk (1939-1940)
- A. Ivanov (1940-1943)
- A. Chernov (1944-1945)
- M. Yushkin (1945-1950)
- I. Pinchuk (1950-1963)
- N. Korobenkov (1964-1968)
- V. Khirov (1968-1976)
- P. Shishkin (1976-1979)
- G. Chijick (1979-1987)
- A. Vasiliyev (1987-1995)
- A. Tsviliy (1995-2005)

=== Oblast Police ===
- Vasiliy Oleynick (Since October 2005)

== See also ==
- Birobidzhan
