= Affair (disambiguation) =

An affair is a sexual relationship, romantic friendship, or passionate attachment between two people without the attached person's significant other knowing.

Affair may also refer to:

- Foreign affairs,
  - as in Foreign policy
  - or Foreign Affairs (publication)
- Internal affairs, as in law enforcement
- Minor military engagement
- Political affairs, see political scandal
- Affair (album), a 1988 album by Cherrelle
- Affairs (album), a 1980 album by Elliott Murphy
- Affair (film), a 2010 Indonesian film
- "Affair" (Big Love), a 2006 television episode
- "Affairs" (Shameless), a 2004 television episode

== See also ==
- The Affair (disambiguation)
