= Buga Wood Pavilion =

BUGA Wood Pavilion
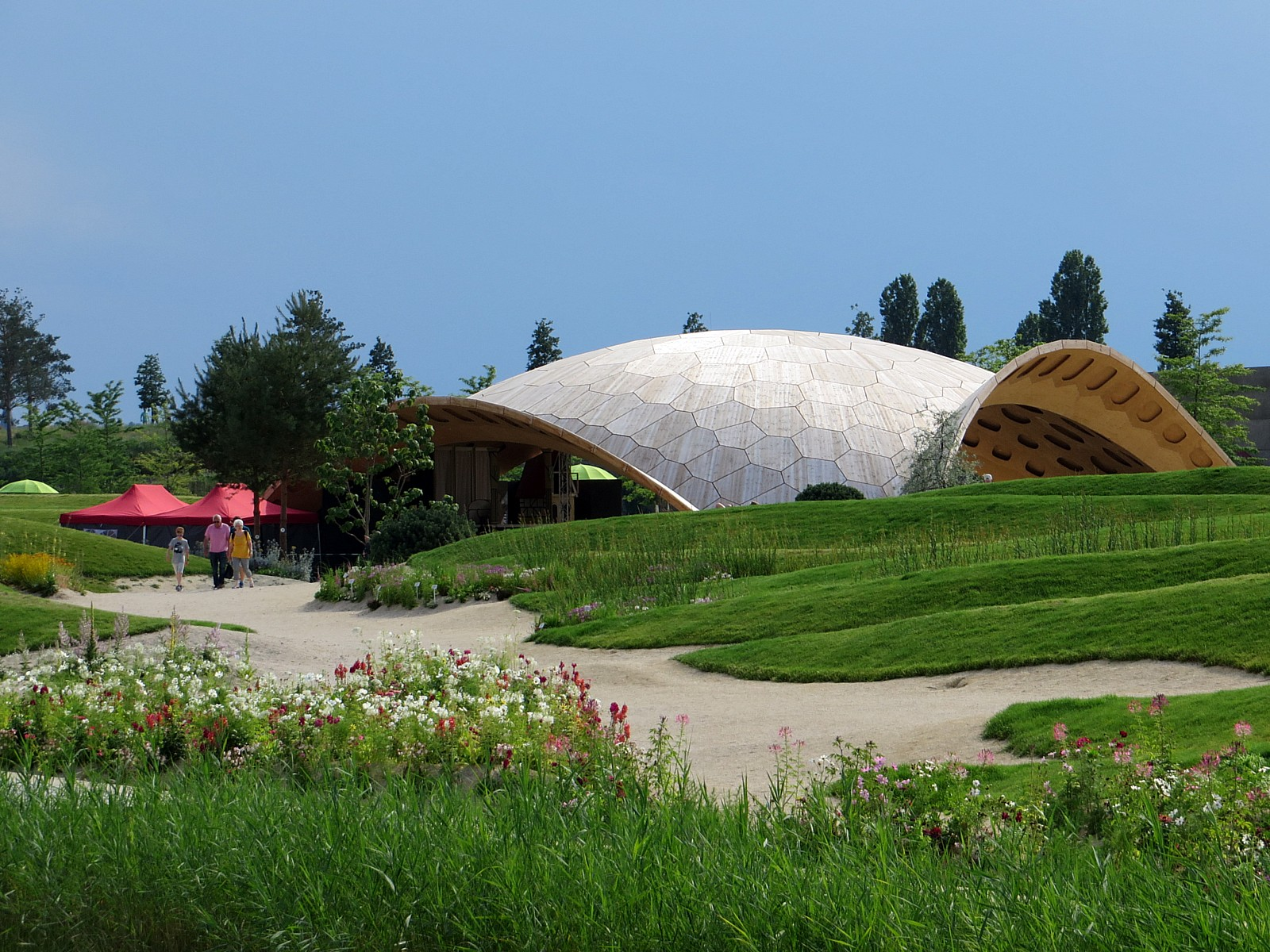
- BUGA Wood Pavilion at the Bundesgartenschau 2019

- Location within Germany
- Alternative names: BUGA Holzpavillon

General information
- Type: Experimental structure
- Location: Heilbronn, Germany
- Coordinates: 49°08′53.2″N 9°12′25.3″E
- Inaugurated: 17 April 2019
- Client: Land Baden Württemberg, Stadt Heilbronn, Bundesgartenschau Heilbronn 2019

Height
- Height: 7.0 m (23.0 ft)

Dimensions
- Diameter: 32.4 m (106 ft)
- Other dimensions: 30 m (98 ft) Span, 600 m^{2} (6,500 sq ft) Shell Area

Technical details
- Structural system: Hollow-Cassette Segmented Timber Shell Structure
- Floor area: 500 m^{2} (5,400 sq ft)

Design and construction
- Architect: ICD - University of Stuttgart
- Structural engineer: ITKE - University of Stuttgart
- Other designers: BUGA GmbH, BEC GmbH
- Main contractor: Müller Blaustein Holzbauwerke GmbH
- Awards and prizes: The National German Sustainability Award (Digitalization - Architecture) German Design Awards (Winner - Excellent Architecture) Iconic Awards (Best of Best - Innovative Material)

Website
- https://icd.uni-stuttgart.de/?p=22287

The BUGA Wood Pavilion (also known as BUGA Holzpavillion) is a 500 m^{2} (5,400 sq ft) experimental shell structure that served as an open event space with a multi-purpose stage at the Bundesgartenschau 2019 in Heilbronn.

== Description ==
The Buga Wood Pavilion is one of two research demonstrator buildings that were constructed on the summer island at the National Horticultural Show 2019 in Heilbronn. The segmented hollow cassette structure is inspired by the skeleton of the sanddollar and was entirely digitally designed. The pavilion was robotically prefabricated with a distributed robotics platform at a local carpentry and assembled on site within 10 days.
