= 1981 National Society of Film Critics Awards =

Annual US film award ceremony

16th NSFC Awards

January 5, 1982

Best Film:
Atlantic City

The 16th National Society of Film Critics Awards, given on 5 January 1982, honored the best filmmaking of 1981.

== Winners ==
=== Best Picture ===
1. Atlantic City
2. Reds
3. Prince of the City
4. Pixote (Pixote: a Lei do Mais Fraco)
5. Pennies from Heaven

=== Best Director ===
1. Louis Malle – Atlantic City
2. Sidney Lumet – Prince of the City
3. Héctor Babenco – Pixote (Pixote: a Lei do Mais Fraco)

=== Best Actor ===
1. Burt Lancaster – Atlantic City
2. Gene Hackman – All Night Long
3. Henry Fonda – On Golden Pond

=== Best Actress ===
1. Marília Pêra – Pixote (Pixote: a Lei do Mais Fraco)
2. Faye Dunaway – Mommie Dearest
3. Diane Keaton – Reds

=== Best Supporting Actor ===
1. Robert Preston – S.O.B.
2. Jerry Orbach – Prince of the City
3. Jack Nicholson – Reds

=== Best Supporting Actress ===
1. Maureen Stapleton – Reds
2. Mona Washbourne – Stevie
3. Lisa Eichhorn – Cutter's Way

=== Best Screenplay ===
1. John Guare – Atlantic City
2. Warren Beatty and Trevor Griffiths – Reds
3. Dennis Potter – Pennies from Heaven
3. Jay Presson Allen and Sidney Lumet – Prince of the City

=== Best Cinematography ===
1. Gordon Willis – Pennies from Heaven
2. Vilmos Zsigmond – Blow Out
3. Vittorio Storaro – Reds
