= Reds (film) =

1981 historical drama film epic by Warren Beatty

- Theatrical release poster
- Directed by: Warren Beatty
- Screenplay by: Warren Beatty; Trevor Griffiths
- Produced by: Warren Beatty
- Starring: Warren Beatty; Diane Keaton; Edward Herrmann; Jerzy Kosiński; Jack Nicholson; Paul Sorvino; Maureen Stapleton
- Cinematography: Vittorio Storaro
- Edited by: Dede Allen; Craig McKay
- Music by: Stephen Sondheim; Dave Grusin
- Production companies: Barclays Mercantile Industrial Finance; JRS Productions
- Distributed by: Paramount Pictures
- Release date: December 4, 1981
- Running time: 195 minutes
- Country: United States
- Languages: English; Russian; German
- Budget: $32 million
- Box office: $40.4 million

Reds is a 1981 American epic historical drama film co-written, produced, and directed by Warren Beatty, about the life and career of John Reed, the journalist and writer who chronicled the October Revolution in Russia in his 1919 book Ten Days That Shook the World. Beatty stars in the lead role alongside Diane Keaton as activist Louise Bryant and Jack Nicholson as playwright Eugene O'Neill.

The supporting cast includes Edward Herrmann, Jerzy Kosiński, Paul Sorvino, Maureen Stapleton, Gene Hackman, Ramon Bieri, Nicolas Coster and M. Emmet Walsh. The film also features, as "witnesses", interviews with the 98-year-old radical educator and peace activist Scott Nearing, author Dorothy Frooks, reporter and author George Seldes, civil liberties advocate Roger Baldwin and writer Henry Miller, among others. George Jessel, who died shortly before the film was released, appears as one of the contemporaries of Reed and Bryant who were interviewed.

Reds was released on December 4, 1981, to widespread critical acclaim. Beatty was awarded the Academy Award for Best Director and the film was nominated for Best Picture, but lost to Chariots of Fire. Beatty, Keaton, Nicholson, and Stapleton were nominated for Best Actor, Best Actress, Best Supporting Actor, and Best Supporting Actress, respectively, with Stapleton winning her category. (Note: Beatty and Keaton lost to Henry Fonda and Katharine Hepburn for On Golden Pond and Nicholson lost to John Gielgud for Arthur.) Beatty became the third person to be nominated for Academy Awards in the categories Best Director, Actor, and, with co-writer Trevor Griffiths, Original Screenplay—losing again to Chariots of Fire—for a film nominated for Best Picture. (Note: This was done previously by Orson Welles for Citizen Kane and Woody Allen for Annie Hall.)

In June 2008, the American Film Institute revealed AFI's 10 Top 10—the best ten films in ten "classic" American film genres—after polling over 1,500 people from the film community. Reds came in ninth in the epic genre.

== Plot ==
In 1915, married journalist and suffragist Louise Bryant encounters the radical journalist John Reed for the first time at a lecture in Portland, Oregon, and is intrigued with his idealism. After meeting him for an interview on international politics that lasts an entire night, she realizes that writing has been her only escape from her frustrated existence. Inspired to leave her husband, Bryant joins Reed in Greenwich Village, New York City, and becomes acquainted with the local community of activists and artists, including anarchist and author Emma Goldman and playwright Eugene O'Neill.

Later, they move to Provincetown, Massachusetts, to concentrate on their writing, becoming involved in the local theater scene. Through her writing, Bryant becomes known as a feminist and radical in her own right. Reed becomes involved in labor strikes with the "Reds" of the Industrial Workers of the World. Obsessed with changing the world, he grows restless and heads for St. Louis to cover the 1916 Democratic National Convention.

During Reed's absence, Bryant falls into a complicated affair with O'Neill. Upon his return, Reed discovers the affair and realizes he still loves Bryant. The two marry secretly and make a home together in Croton-on-Hudson, New York, but still have conflicting desires. When Reed admits his own infidelities, Bryant takes a ship to Europe to work as a war correspondent.

After a flareup of a kidney disorder results in his having one removed, Reed is warned to avoid excessive travel or stress, but decides to take the same path as Louise and goes to Europe. Reunited as professionals, the two find their passion rekindled as they travel to Russia and are swept up in the fall of the czarist regime and the events of the 1917 Revolution.

After returning to the United States, Reed writes Ten Days That Shook the World, while Louise is called to testify in front of the Overman Committee. In order to implement the communist ideals he saw in Russia, Reed becomes active in the Socialist Party of America's new Left Wing Section. The Socialist Party soon undergoes a major political shift, with Reed and the Left Wing elected to 12 of its National Executive Committee's 15 seats, but the sitting members of the Committee prevent a takeover of the party by invalidating the election and expelling the entire Left Wing. Differing ideology among the expelled members causes them to splinter into two rival organizations, with Reed forming the Communist Labor Party of America. Anxious to establish his group as the United States' true Communist Party, Reed plans to return to Russia to secure official recognition from the Soviet Comintern. Having grown tired of the political infighting, Bryant threatens to end their relationship if he goes, but he does so anyway, promising to be home by Christmas.

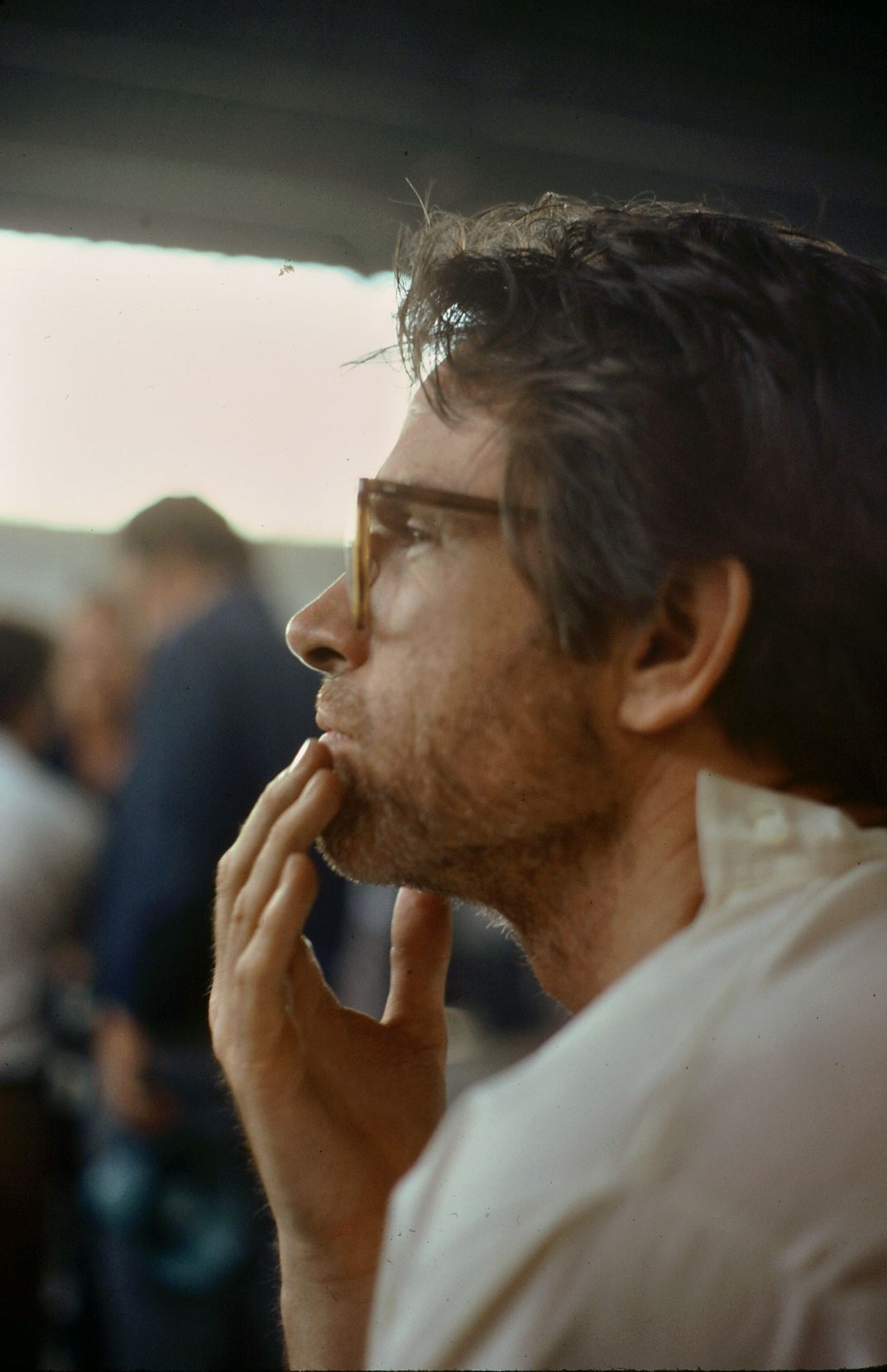
Warren Beatty as John Reed on the set of the film Reds (1981).

As it was now illegal to travel to Russia, Reed enters the country by traveling to Finland and sneaking across the border. His endorsement is rejected by the Comintern while Zinoviev tries to keep him in Russia. Reed tries to leave on his own and return to Bryant, but is imprisoned in Finland after being caught at the border. After learning of his arrest, Louise seeks the U.S. government's help in securing his release, but it refuses, as in his absence, he has been indicted on charges of seditious conspiracy.

With no other recourse, Louise illegally travels to Finland herself, but by the time she arrives, Reed has been returned to Russia as part of a prisoner exchange between the two countries.

Now living in Petrograd, Reed is employed as a propagandist with the Comintern, and shares an apartment with Emma Goldman, who had been deported from the U.S. Unaware that Louise has traveled to Finland, he repeatedly tries to make contact with her by sending telegrams to New York and becomes increasingly frustrated by the lack of response. Louise makes her way to Petrograd, where she is found by Emma, who tells her Reed was sent to deliver a speech in Baku.

During his return to Petrograd, the czarist White Army attacks Reed's train. Reed survives the attack and is reunited with Louise at the train station. Soon thereafter, he is admitted to the hospital with typhus, and Louise cares for him. On his last day, they have loving words for each other. Louise goes down the hall to get him water and returns to find him dead. She enters his room, takes his hand, and sits by his bed.

== Cast ==
- Warren Beatty as John Silas "Jack" Reed
- Diane Keaton as Louise Bryant
- Edward Herrmann as Max Eastman
- Jerzy Kosiński as Grigory Zinoviev
- Jack Nicholson as Eugene O'Neill
- Paul Sorvino as Louis C. Fraina
- Maureen Stapleton as Emma Goldman
- Oleg Kerensky Jr as Alexander Kerensky
- Nicolas Coster as Paul Trullinger
- M. Emmet Walsh as Liberal Club Speaker
- Ian Wolfe as Mr. Partlow
- Bessie Love as Mrs. Partlow
- Max Wright as Floyd Dell
- George Plimpton as Horace Whigham
- Harry Ditson as Maurice Becker
- Leigh Curran as Ida Rauh
- Kathryn Grody as Crystal Eastman
- Nancy Duiguid as Jane Heap
- Dolph Sweet as Big Bill Haywood
- Gene Hackman as Pete Van Wherry
- Gerald Hiken as Dr. Lorber
- William Daniels as Julius Gerber
- Dave King as Allan L. Benson
- Denis Pekarev as Interpreter
- Roger Sloman as Vladimir Lenin
- Stuart Richman as Leon Trotsky
- John J. Hooker as Senator Overman
- Jerry Hardin as Harry
- R. G. Armstrong as Agent
- Jack Kehoe as Eddie
- Jan Tříska as Karl Radek

== Production ==
=== Development ===
Warren Beatty came across the story of John Reed in the mid-1960s. Executive producer and film editor Dede Allen remembers Beatty's mentioning making a film about Reed's life as early as 1966. Originally titled Comrades, the first script was written by Beatty in 1969, (Note: Attorney Ed Rubin, spokesman for Beatty, briefly outlined the origins of Reds in a UPI story about a lawsuit brought against Beatty and Paramount by William Greene and Helen Smith, authors of a study of Louise Bryant. Greene contended the film was based upon their work and they did not receive proper compensation. Rubin said Greene had initiated contact with Beatty in 1973, asking the actor to read his manuscript. Advised not to read it without making payment, Beatty paid Greene $250 in a written agreement. Beatty reportedly found the material without substantial value, and he vigorously denied the allegations made in the suit.) but the process stalled. In 1973, Beatty was offered the role of Reed in Sergei Bondarchuk's Soviet film production Red Bells, but declined, and felt further driven to make his own biopic about Reed to compete with the Soviet version.

In 1976, Beatty found a suitable collaborator in Trevor Griffiths, who began work but was delayed by his wife Janice Stansfield's death in a plane crash. The preliminary draft of the script was finished in 1978. Beatty still had problems with it and he and Griffiths spent four and a half months fixing it. Beatty also collaborated with his friends Robert Towne, Peter Feibleman, and Elaine May to continue polishing the script after shooting had begun.

=== Financing ===
Beatty achieved tremendous success with 1978's Heaven Can Wait, which he produced, starred in, co-wrote and co-directed for Paramount Pictures. The success gave Beatty the clout to seek funding for his long nurtured Reds project, which was difficult to secure because of the controversial communist subject matter and high price tag. Beatty succeeded in interesting both Warner Bros. and Paramount, before the head of Gulf & Western (Paramount's parent company), Charles Bluhdorn, agreed to finance the project. Bluhdorn soon had second thoughts, and attempted to dissuade Beatty with the promise of underwriting a $25 million alternative to Reds of Beatty's choice, but Beatty remained committed.

=== Casting ===
Beatty originally had no intention of acting in the film or even directing it because he had learned on projects such as Bonnie and Clyde (1967) and Heaven Can Wait (1978) that producing a film alone is a difficult task. He briefly considered John Lithgow for the part of John Reed because the two were similar in appearance, but eventually Beatty decided to act in the film and direct it himself. Jack Nicholson was cast as Eugene O'Neill over James Taylor and Sam Shepard. Nicholson was older than the young O'Neill he was playing, and having just completed work on Kubrick's The Shining (1980), was in a "most shambolic" and "grotesque" physical state, according to producer Simon Relph. But Nicholson was committed to the role and appeared at the start of filming four months later having lost the weight he had gained and looking much younger.

Beatty also chose to cast non-actors in supporting roles, including George Plimpton, the editor of The Paris Review, who played the character of Horace Whigham. Jerzy Kosiński, a Polish American novelist, was asked to play the role of Grigory Zinoviev, but he initially refused because he was a fierce anti-communist and feared that he might be abducted by the KGB if he went to Finland to film.

==== The Witnesses ====
To gain perspective on the lives of Reed and Louise Bryant, Beatty filmed interviews with a group of men and women, referred to only as "The Witnesses", as early as 1971. American Film identified the witnesses in its March 1982 issue.

In a capsule review for The New York Times, film critic Vincent Canby refers to them as "more than two dozen very, very old people, billed only as The Witnesses, whom Mr. Beatty interviewed about the Reeds and their long-gone times." He went on to say, "More than anything else in Reds, these interviews give the film its poignant point of view and separate it from all other romantic adventure films ever made." "The most evocative aspect of the presentation is a documentary enhancement – interviews with a number of venerable 'witnesses,' whose recollections of the period help to set the scene, bridge transitions and preserve a touching human perspective", wrote Gary Arnold of The Washington Post.

- Jacob Bailin, labor organizer
- Roger Nash Baldwin, founder, American Civil Liberties Union
- John Ballato, early socialist
- Harry Carlisle, writer, teacher
- Kenneth Chamberlain, political cartoonist for The Masses
- Andrew Dasburg, painter
- Tess Davis, cousin of Louise Bryant's first husband
- Will Durant, historian
- Blanche Hays Fagen, member of the Provincetown Players
- Hamilton Fish, congressman, Harvard classmate of John Reed
- Dorothy Frooks, recruiting girl, World War I
- Hugo Gellert, artist for The Masses
- Emmanuel Herbert, student in Petrograd, 1917–1918
- George Jessel, entertainer
- Oleg Kerensky, son of Alexander Kerensky
- Isaac Don Levine, journalist, translator for Reed
- Arthur Mayer, film historian, Harvard classmate of Reed, also film distributor
- Henry Miller, novelist
- Adele Nathan, member of the Provincetown Players
- Scott Nearing, sociologist, pacifist
- Dora Russell, delegate to Comintern
- George Seldes, U.S. journalist in Moscow
- Art Shields, political activist
- Jessica Smith, political activist
- Lucita Squier, screenwriter and widow of Albert Rhys Williams, who was an American participant in the Russian Revolution, pro-Soviet author, friend and biographer of Lenin
- Adela Rogers St. Johns, journalist
- Arne Swabeck, member, Communist Labor Party
- Bernadine Szold-Fritz, journalist
- Galina von Meck, witness to Russian Revolution
- Heaton Vorse, son of Provincetown Playhouse founder Mary Heaton Vorse
- Will Weinstone, organizer, U.S. Communist Party
- Rebecca West, writer, novelist

=== Filming ===
When principal photography began in August 1979 the original intention was for a 15- to 16-week shoot, but it ultimately took one year. Filming took place in five countries and at various points the crew had to wait for snow to fall in Helsinki (and other parts of Finland), which stood in for the Soviet Union, and for rain to stop in Spain. Beatty asked the Soviet government for a permit to film in Moscow but was denied. A cottage in Kent was used to depict exteriors of the Reeds' home in Croton-on-Hudson, which in reality was a small early American saltbox house. The interior sets built at Twickenham Studios and EMI-Elstree Studios were also enlarged to evoke the "flavor" of the real home without reproducing it exactly.

Other English locations included Frensham Ponds in Surrey, which stood in for Provincetown, the Smeaton Room of the Institution of Civil Engineers at One Great George Street for the Liberal Club meeting room in Portland, and the interior of Lancaster House for that of the Winter Palace in Saint Petersburg. Another round of filming began in 1980 in New York City, Washington, D.C., and Los Angeles, including Paramount Studios.

The Italian cinematographer Vittorio Storaro was banned from shooting the scenes shot in the U.S. after he was unable to gain an H-1B visa and because local trade unions blocked him from doing work on the film. The film encountered similar problems with trade unions in the United Kingdom, and had to hire a separate British crew and pay British actors enrolled in Equity at Screen Actors Guild-rate salaries in order to allow American actors to film scenes in the U.K. These trade disputes caused the film to run heavily over budget, but the studio ultimately recouped its costs after financing the film with a low-interest loan from Barclays as part of a tax-shelter plan. Later saying the film "broke even, plus change", Paramount head Barry Diller added, "I'm proud we made Reds. I'm also proud we protected ourselves in every way known to man".

Actress Maureen Stapleton was due to begin shooting her scenes in London in November 1979, but she refused to take a plane because of a fear of flying. Because it was the wrong season for ocean liner travel, the production had to arrange for Stapleton to travel on a tramp steamer, which broke down in the North Atlantic and had to be towed to Amsterdam. This caused another unwelcome delay. Beatty would also not stop the camera between takes, letting it roll continuously, and insisted on a large number of takes. Paul Sorvino said he did as many as 70 takes for one scene; Stapleton had to do 80 takes of one scene, which caused her to say to Beatty, "Are you out of your fucking mind?"

Beatty and Diane Keaton's romantic relationship also began to deteriorate during filming. Peter Biskind wrote about the making of Reds, "Beatty's relationship with Keaton barely survived the shoot. It is always a dicey proposition when an actress works with a star or director—both, in this case—with whom she has an offscreen relationship. Keaton appeared in more scenes than any other actor save Beatty, and many of them were difficult ones, where she had to assay a wide range of feelings, from romantic passion to anger, and deliver several lengthy, complex, emotional speeches." George Plimpton once observed, "Diane almost got broken. I thought [Beatty] was trying to break her into what Louise Bryant had been like with John Reed." Executive producer Simon Relph adds, "It must have been a strain on their relationship because he was completely obsessive, relentless."

=== Post-production ===
The editing process began in early 1980, with as many as 65 people working on editing down and going over approximately 2.5 million feet of film. Post-production ended in November 1981, more than two years after the start of filming. Paramount stated that the final cost of the film was $32 million, the rough equivalent of $80 million in 2007 and $122 million in 2024.

=== Music ===
The film introduced the song "Goodbye for Now", written by Stephen Sondheim, recorded by Jean-Pierre Rampal and Claude Bolling. The song was later recorded by Barbra Streisand for The Movie Album (2003).

== Reception ==
Released on December 4, 1981, Reds opened to widespread critical acclaim. Despite its political subject matter and limited promotion by Beatty, the film became the 13th-highest-grossing picture of 1981, grossing $40 million in U.S. box office revenues, a figure that does not include the film's foreign box office revenues or its substantial subsequent earnings in home video, worldwide broadcast and cable television, and subscription television and streaming services. Beatty later remarked that the film "made a little money" in box office returns. During the film's second and third weekends, there were concerns that it would become a massive flop like Heaven's Gate, but it performed more strongly over the next month. The film was screened at the White House for President Ronald Reagan.

Reds holds a 90% "Fresh" rating on the review aggregate website Rotten Tomatoes based on 49 reviews, with an average rating of 7.90/10. The site's consensus reads, "Brawny in both intellect and scope, Reds is an intimate epic that captures the tumult of revolutionary change and the passion of those navigating through it." On Metacritic, the film has a score of 76 out of 100 based on 15 reviews, indicating "generally favorable reviews".

John Simon of the National Review wrote, "Never exactly boring, sometimes entertaining, Reds is frequently irritating and finally disappointing". Commentary published a largely negative review by Richard Grenier, who, among other things, saw the film as deliberately obscuring the protagonists' communist politics and as exaggerating Bryant's talent and accomplishments. Conversely, in a retrospective article for Jacobin, Jim Poe called Reds "one of the greatest and most faithful depictions of revolutionary politics", praising its "light touch and brisk storytelling" for an epic, as well as its cinematography, shifts in mood and performances, in particular those of Keaton and Beatty.

The February 2020 issue of New York Magazine lists Reds as among "The Best Movies That Lost Best Picture at the Oscars."

== Awards and nominations ==
Award	Category	Nominee(s)	Result
Academy Awards	Best Picture	Warren Beatty	Nominated
Academy Awards	Best Director	Warren Beatty	Won
Academy Awards	Best Actor	Warren Beatty	Nominated
Academy Awards	Best Actress	Diane Keaton	Nominated
Academy Awards	Best Supporting Actor	Jack Nicholson	Nominated
Academy Awards	Best Supporting Actress	Maureen Stapleton	Won
Academy Awards	Best Screenplay – Written Directly for the Screen	Warren Beatty and Trevor Griffiths	Nominated
Academy Awards	Best Art Direction	Richard Sylbert and Michael Seirton	Nominated
Academy Awards	Best Cinematography	Vittorio Storaro	Won
Academy Awards	Best Costume Design	Shirley Ann Russell	Nominated
Academy Awards	Best Film Editing	Dede Allen and Craig McKay	Nominated
Academy Awards	Best Sound	Dick Vorisek, Tom Fleischman and Simon Kaye	Nominated
American Cinema Editors Awards	Best Edited Feature Film	Dede Allen and Craig McKay	Nominated
Boston Society of Film Critics Awards	Best Supporting Actor	Jack Nicholson	Won
British Academy Film Awards	Best Actor in a Leading Role	Warren Beatty	Nominated
British Academy Film Awards	Best Actress in a Leading Role	Diane Keaton	Nominated
British Academy Film Awards	Best Actor in a Supporting Role	Jack Nicholson	Won
British Academy Film Awards	Best Actress in a Supporting Role	Maureen Stapleton	Won
British Academy Film Awards	Best Cinematography	Vittorio Storaro	Nominated
British Academy Film Awards	Best Costume Design	Shirley Ann Russell	Nominated
David di Donatello Awards	Best Foreign Producer	Warren Beatty	Won
David di Donatello Awards	Best Foreign Actress	Diane Keaton	Won
Directors Guild of America Awards	Outstanding Directorial Achievement in Motion Pictures	Warren Beatty	Won
Golden Globe Awards	Best Motion Picture – Drama		Nominated
Golden Globe Awards	Best Director – Motion Picture	Warren Beatty	Won
Golden Globe Awards	Best Actor in a Motion Picture – Drama	Warren Beatty	Nominated
Golden Globe Awards	Best Actress in a Motion Picture – Drama	Diane Keaton	Nominated
Golden Globe Awards	Best Supporting Actor – Motion Picture	Jack Nicholson	Nominated
Golden Globe Awards	Best Supporting Actress – Motion Picture	Maureen Stapleton	Nominated
Golden Globe Awards	Best Screenplay – Motion Picture	Warren Beatty and Trevor Griffiths	Nominated
Los Angeles Film Critics Association Awards	Best Film		Runner-up
Los Angeles Film Critics Association Awards	Best Director	Warren Beatty	Won
Los Angeles Film Critics Association Awards	Best Actress	Diane Keaton	Runner-up
Los Angeles Film Critics Association Awards	Best Supporting Actor	Jack Nicholson	Runner-up
Los Angeles Film Critics Association Awards	Best Supporting Actress	Maureen Stapleton	Won
Los Angeles Film Critics Association Awards	Best Screenplay	Warren Beatty and Trevor Griffiths	Runner-up
Los Angeles Film Critics Association Awards	Best Cinematography	Vittorio Storaro	Won
National Board of Review Awards	Best Film		Won (Note: Tied with Chariots of Fire.)
National Board of Review Awards	Top Ten Films		Won
National Board of Review Awards	Best Director	Warren Beatty	Won
National Board of Review Awards	Best Supporting Actor	Jack Nicholson	Won
National Society of Film Critics Awards	Best Film		2nd Place
National Society of Film Critics Awards	Best Actress	Diane Keaton	3rd Place
National Society of Film Critics Awards	Best Supporting Actor	Jack Nicholson	3rd Place
National Society of Film Critics Awards	Best Supporting Actress	Maureen Stapleton	Won
National Society of Film Critics Awards	Best Screenplay	Warren Beatty and Trevor Griffiths	3rd Place
National Society of Film Critics Awards	Best Cinematography	Vittorio Storaro	Nominated
New York Film Critics Circle Awards	Best Film		Won
New York Film Critics Circle Awards	Best Director	Warren Beatty	Won
New York Film Critics Circle Awards	Best Actress	Diane Keaton	Runner-up
New York Film Critics Circle Awards	Best Supporting Actor	Jack Nicholson	Runner-up
New York Film Critics Circle Awards	Best Supporting Actress	Maureen Stapleton	Runner-up
New York Film Critics Circle Awards	Best Cinematography	Vittorio Storaro	Nominated
Writers Guild of America Awards	Best Drama Written Directly for the Screen	Warren Beatty and Trevor Griffiths	Won

The film is recognized by the American Film Institute in these lists:

- AFI's 100 Years...100 Passions – #55
- AFI's 10 Top 10 – #9 Epic Film
