= 1981 New York Film Critics Circle Awards =

47th New York Film Critics Circle Awards

47th New York Film Critics Circle Awards

January 31, 1982

Best Picture:
Reds

The 47th New York Film Critics Circle Awards honored the best filmmaking of 1981. The winners were announced on 21 December 1981 and the awards were given on 31 January 1982.

== Winners ==
- Best Actor:
  - Burt Lancaster - Atlantic City
  - Runners-up: Henry Fonda - On Golden Pond and Robert Duvall - True Confessions
- Best Actress:
  - Glenda Jackson - Stevie
  - Runners-up: Faye Dunaway - Mommie Dearest and Diane Keaton - Reds
- Best Cinematography:
  - David Watkin - Chariots of Fire
- Best Director:
  - Sidney Lumet - Prince of the City
  - Runners-up: Louis Malle - Atlantic City, Hugh Hudson - Chariots of Fire and Warren Beatty - Reds
- Best Film:
  - Reds
  - Runners-up: Prince of the City, Atlantic City and Chariots of Fire
- Best Foreign Language Film:
  - Pixote (Pixote: a Lei do Mais Fraco) • Brazil
  - Runners-up: Man of Iron (Człowiek z żelaza) • Poland, Man of Marble (Człowiek z marmuru) • Poland and The Last Metro (Le dernier métro) • France
- Best Screenplay:
  - John Guare - Atlantic City
  - Runners-up: Sidney Lumet and Jay Presson Allen - Prince of the City, Dennis Potter - Pennies from Heaven and Steve Gordon - Arthur
- Best Supporting Actor:
  - John Gielgud - Arthur
  - Runners-up: Jack Nicholson - Reds, Jerry Orbach - Prince of the City and Howard E. Rollins Jr. - Ragtime
- Best Supporting Actress:
  - Mona Washbourne - Stevie
  - Runners-up: Marília Pêra - Pixote (Pixote: a Lei do Mais Fraco) and Maureen Stapleton - Reds
- Special Awards:
  - Andrzej Wajda
  - Krzysztof Zanussi
  - Abel Gance's Napoléon
