= Boston Society of Film Critics Awards 1981 =

Annual US film awards ceremony

2nd Boston Society of Film Critics Awards

January 29, 1982

Best Film:
Pixote

The 2nd Boston Society of Film Critics Awards honored the best filmmaking of 1981. The awards were given on 29 January 1982.

== Winners ==
- Best Film:
  - Pixote (Pixote: a Lei do Mais Fraco)
- Best Actor:
  - Burt Lancaster – Atlantic City
- Best Actress:
  - Marília Pêra – Pixote (Pixote: a Lei do Mais Fraco)
- Best Supporting Actor:
  - Jack Nicholson – Reds
- Best Supporting Actress:
  - Mona Washbourne – Stevie
- Best Director:
  - Steven Spielberg – Raiders of the Lost Ark
- Best Screenplay:
  - Andre Gregory and Wallace Shawn – My Dinner with Andre
- Best Cinematography:
  - Gordon Willis – Pennies from Heaven
- Best Documentary:
  - Diaries
- Best Foreign-Language Film (tie):
  - Beau Pere (Beau-père) • France
  - Taxi zum Klo • West Germany
- Best Independent Film:
  - Gal Young 'Un
- Best American Film:
  - My Dinner with Andre
