= 34th Writers Guild of America Awards =

34th WGA Awards
- Date: 1982
- Organized by: Writers Guild of America, East and the Writers Guild of America, West

The 34th Writers Guild of America Awards honored the best television, and film writers of 1981. Winners were announced in 1982.

== Winners and nominees ==
=== Film ===
Winners are listed first highlighted in boldface.

**Best Drama Written Directly for the Screen**: **Reds, Written by Warren Beatty and Trevor Griffiths**; Absence of Malice, Written by Kurt Luedtke; Atlantic City, Written by John Guare; Body Heat, Written by Lawrence Kasdan	**Best Comedy Written Directly for the Screen**: **Arthur, Written by Steve Gordon**; The Four Seasons; Written by Alan Alda; Raiders of the Lost Ark, Written by Lawrence Kasdan, George Lucas and Philip Kaufman; S.O.B., Written by Blake Edwards
**Best Drama Adapted from Another Medium**: **On Golden Pond, Screenplay by Ernest Thompson and Donald E. Stewart; Based on his play**; Cutter's Way, Screenplay by Jeffrey Alan Fiskin; Based on the novel by Newton Thornburg; Prince of the City, Screenplay by Jay Presson Allen and Sidney Lumet; Based on the book by Robert Daley; Ragtime, Screenplay by Michael Weller; Based on the novel by E.L. Doctorow	**Best Comedy Adapted from Another Medium**: **Rich and Famous, Screenplay by Gerald Ayres; Based on the play by John Van Druten**; First Monday in October, Screenplay by Jerome Lawrence and Robert E. Lee; Based on their play; For Your Eyes Only, Screenplay by Richard Maibaum, and Michael G. Wilson; Based on the stories by Ian Fleming

=== Television ===
**Episodic Comedy**: **"Stormy Weather" – Barney Miller (CBS) – Nat Mauldin**; "Field Associate" – Barney Miller (CBS) – Jordan Moffet; "A War for All Seasons" – M*A*S*H (CBS) – Dan Wilcox and Thad Mumford; "No Sweat" – M*A*S*H (CBS) – John Rappaport; "Crazy Judge" – Park Place (CBS) – Reinhold Weege; "Tony's Sister and Jim" – Taxi (ABC) – Michael Leeson; "Thy Boss' Wife" – Taxi (ABC) – Ken Estin; "The Greatest American Hero" – The Greatest American Hero (ABC) – Stephen J. Cannell	**Episodic Drama**: **"Hill Street Station" – Hill Street Blues (NBC) – Michael Kozoll and Steven Bochco**; "Film at Eleven" – Hill Street Blues (NBC) – Anthony Yerkovich; "Strike" – Lou Grant (CBS) – April Smith; "Campesinos" – Lou Grant (CBS) – Michael Vittes; "Bless You Hawkeye" – M*A*S*H (CBS) – Dan Wilcox and Thad Mumford; "Future City" – Palmerstown, U.S.A. (CBS) – Ronald Rubin
**Daytime Serials**: **Ryan's Hope (ABC) – Paul Avila Mayer, Claire Labine, Mary Munisteri and Jeffrey Lane**; The Doctors (NBC) – Dennis de Brito and Elizabeth Levin; Texas (NBC) – John Williams Corrington, Joyce Hooper Corrington, Ralph Adamo, Harry Boehm, Elizabeth Boehm, Carole Berlin and Patrick Mulcahey	**Children's Show**: **"Sunshine's On the Way" – NBC Special Treat (NBC) – W.W. Lewis**; "Family of Strangers" – ABC Afterschool Special (ABC) – Jeffrey Kindley and Len Jenkin; "The Treasure of Alpheus Winterborn" – CBS Children's Mystery Theatre (CBS) – Kimmer Ringwald
**Anthology Drama Adapted**: **Bitter Harvest (NBC) – Richard Friedenberg**; Life on the Mississippi (PBS) – Philip H. Reisman Jr.; The Acorn People (NBC) – Joan Tewkesbury

=== Special awards ===
Laurel Award for Screenwriting Achievement
**Paul Osborn**
Laurel Award for TV Writing Achievement
**John McGreevey**
Valentine Davies Award
**Mort R. Lewis**
Morgan Cox Award
**Brad Radnitz**
