= 1981 Los Angeles Film Critics Association Awards =

Annual US film awards ceremony

7th LAFCA Awards
- Date: December 14, 1981

Highlights
- Best Picture: Atlantic City

The 7th Los Angeles Film Critics Association Awards, honoring the best filmmaking of 1980, were announced on 14 December 1981 and given on 13 January 1982.

== Winners ==
- Best Picture:
  - Atlantic City
  - Runner-up: Reds
- Best Director:
  - Warren Beatty - Reds
  - Runner-up: Lawrence Kasdan – Body Heat
- Best Actor:
  - Burt Lancaster – Atlantic City
  - Runner-up: Henry Fonda – On Golden Pond
- Best Actress:
  - Meryl Streep – The French Lieutenant's Woman
  - Runner-up: Diane Keaton – Reds
- Best Supporting Actor:
  - John Gielgud – Arthur
  - Runner-up: Jack Nicholson – Reds
- Best Supporting Actress:
  - Maureen Stapleton – Reds
  - Runner-up: Melinda Dillon – Absence of Malice
- Best Screenplay:
  - John Guare – Atlantic City
  - Runner-up: Warren Beatty and Trevor Griffiths – Reds
- Best Cinematography:
  - Vittorio Storaro – Reds
  - Runner-up: Freddie Francis – The French Lieutenant's Woman
- Best Music Score:
  - Randy Newman – Ragtime
  - Runner-up: Vangelis – Chariots of Fire
- Best Foreign Film:
  - Pixote (Pixote: A Lei do Mais Fraco) • Brazil
  - Runner-up: Chariots of Fire • UK
- Experimental/Independent Film/Video Award:
  - R. Bruce Elder – The Art of Worldly Wisdom
- New Generation Award:
  - John Guare
- Career Achievement Award:
  - Barbara Stanwyck
- Special Citation:
  - Kevin Brownlow – Napoléon
