= Daniel Robert =

Daniel Robert may refer to:

- Daniel Robert (baseball) (born 1994), American baseball player
- Daniel Robert (set decorator), American set decorator
