= National Board of Review Awards 1981 =

Annual US film awards ceremony

53rd National Board of Review Awards

December 15, 1981

The 53rd National Board of Review Awards were announced on December 15, 1981.

== Top Ten Films ==
1. Chariots of Fire, Reds
2. Atlantic City
3. Stevie
4. Gallipoli
5. On Golden Pond
6. Prince of the City
7. Raiders of the Lost Ark
8. Heartland
9. Ticket to Heaven
10. Breaker Morant

== Top Foreign Films ==
1. A Few Days from the Life of I. I. Oblomov
2. The Boat Is Full
3. The Last Metro
4. Kontrakt
5. Pixote

== Winners ==
- Best Film: Chariots of Fire, Reds
- Best Foreign Film: A Few Days from the Life of I. I. Oblomov
- Best Actor: Henry Fonda (On Golden Pond)
- Best Actress: Glenda Jackson (Stevie)
- Best Supporting Actor: Jack Nicholson (Reds)
- Best Supporting Actress: Mona Washbourne (Stevie)
- Best Director: Warren Beatty (Reds)
- Career Achievement Award: James Cagney
- Special Award: Blanche Sweet for her leadership of the National Board of Review; Kevin Brownlow, for the restoration of Napoléon
