= Atlantic City (1980 film) =

1980 romantic crime film directed by Louis Malle

- Theatrical release poster
- Directed by: Louis Malle
- Written by: John Guare
- Produced by: Denis Héroux; John Kemeny
- Starring: Burt Lancaster; Susan Sarandon; Kate Reid; Robert Joy; Hollis McLaren; Michel Piccoli; Al Waxman
- Cinematography: Richard Ciupka
- Edited by: Suzanne Baron
- Music by: Michel Legrand
- Production companies: Selta Films; ICC; Cine-Neighbor; Famous Players Ltd. Canadian Film Development Corporation
- Distributed by: Paramount Pictures (North America); NPF Planfilm (France)
- Release dates: September 3, 1980 (France); December 19, 1980 (Canada)
- Running time: 105 minutes
- Countries: France; Canada; United States
- Language: English
- Budget: $7.2 million
- Box office: $12.7 million

Atlantic City (French: Atlantic City, USA) is a 1980 romantic crime film directed by Louis Malle from a screenplay by John Guare. It stars Burt Lancaster and Susan Sarandon in the leading roles, with a supporting cast featuring Kate Reid, Michel Piccoli, Robert Joy, Hollis McLaren, and Al Waxman. An international co-production led between France and Canada, it was released in 1980 and in the United States later that year by Paramount Pictures.

The film opened to critical acclaim and was nominated for the Big Five Academy Awards: Best Picture, Best Director, Best Actor (for Lancaster), Best Actress (for Sarandon), and Best Original Screenplay, but did not win in any category. In Canada, it won Genie Awards for Best Performance by a Foreign Actress (for Sarandon), Best Supporting Actress (for Reid), and Best Art Direction, with three additional nominations. In France, it was nominated for the César Awards for Best Screenplay, Dialogue or Adaptation and Best Music. The film won the Golden Lion at the 37th Venice International Film Festival in a tie with Gloria by John Cassavetes.

In 2003, Atlantic City was selected for preservation in the United States National Film Registry at the Library of Congress, being deemed "culturally, historically, or aesthetically significant", being one of the Registry's few additions to be primarily produced through other countries, but was eligible due to the involvement from Paramount Pictures who were directly involved in financing the production and helped make the film in the United States through their division Famous Players Ltd..

== Plot ==
Sally Matthews is a young waitress from Saskatchewan, Canada, working at an oyster bar in an Atlantic City casino. She has dreams of becoming a blackjack dealer, going through dealer training under the tutelage of Joseph. Joseph, from France, encourages her to learn French and become a dealer in Monte Carlo.

Sally's estranged husband Dave and her pregnant sister Chrissie show up one day with the intention of selling a $10,000 (equivalent to $39,000 in 2025) bag of cocaine he had stolen from a mob dead drop in Philadelphia. Sally is outraged to see him, as he had impregnated Chrissie and run off with her. Dave meets Lou, an aging former gangster who lives in Sally's apartment building and runs a small time numbers game in poor areas of the city; Lou also acts as a caretaker for Grace, a seemingly bedridden, aging beauty queen whose gangster husband he used to work under, and who constantly berates and demeans him. Dave convinces Lou to sell the cocaine for him, but as Lou sells the first batch to Alfie, who runs an illegal poker game in a hotel room, Dave is attacked and killed by the mobsters from whom he had stolen the drugs.

Lou is left with the remaining cocaine and continues to sell it to impress Sally, whom he has long pined for, with money. Sally and Lou make love one day, but she returns to her apartment to find it trashed; she has been tracked down by Dave's killers, who beat her to find out if she has the drugs. They leave, but Lou laments not being able to protect her. Grace also reveals that Lou was a small-time crook and nowhere near as competent as he pretends.

Sally is fired from the casino when her late husband's criminal record is discovered. Lou sells most of the remainder of the cocaine, while both Sally and the mobsters discover Lou's affiliation with Dave. The mobsters corner them one night, but are killed when Lou produces a gun and shoots them. He and Sally then steal their car and leave Atlantic City. That night, from a motel, they watch the TV news reporting on the killing. A police sketch of the suspect is shown. It looks nothing like Lou. Lou is overjoyed with relief and pride. He confesses to Sally that this was the first time he has ever killed anyone.

At the motel the next morning, Lou takes the phone to the bathroom to call Grace and brag about the killings. Sally wakes and takes half of the money with the intention of sneaking off; Lou witnesses this, allowing her to leave and giving her the car keys so she can escape to France, rather than go to Miami with him. Lou returns to Atlantic City to be with Grace. Working together, they sell the remaining portion of the cocaine and walk off arm in arm with renewed respect for each other.

== Cast ==
- Burt Lancaster as Lou
- Susan Sarandon as Sally
- Kate Reid as Grace
- Michel Piccoli as Joseph
- Hollis McLaren as Chrissie
- Robert Joy as Dave
- Al Waxman as Alfie
- Robert Goulet as himself

Other cast members in the film include Moses Znaimer (Felix), Angus MacInnes (Vinnie) and Sean Sullivan (Buddy) as a trio of mob thugs, Louis Del Grande as casino manager Mr. Shapiro, Norma Dell'Agnese as Jeanne, John McCurry as Fred, Cec Linder as the hospital president, Sean McCann as a police detective, and Harvey Atkin as a bus driver.

Wallace Shawn, one of the subjects of Malle's film My Dinner with Andre, makes a cameo appearance as a waiter.

== Production ==
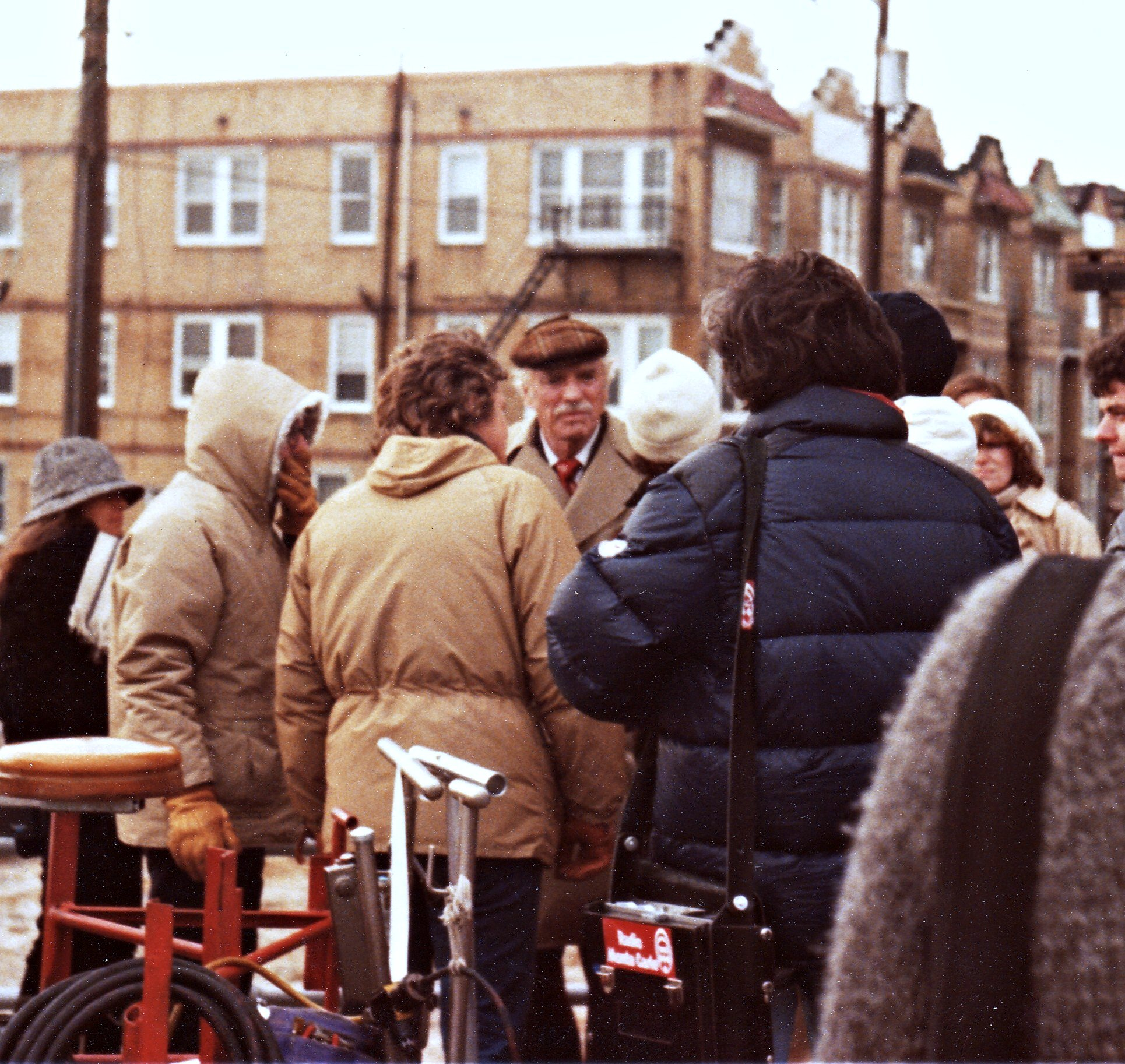
Burt Lancaster on the set of Atlantic City. Director Louis Malle on the left.

Atlantic City was filmed on location in and around Atlantic City and South Jersey, Philadelphia, and New York City. Although filmed in the United States, the film was primarily a co-production between France and Canada. The film's production was initiated by International Cinema Corporation (I.C.C) and lead between Selta Films and Cine-Neighbor. The film's production had significant financial backing and involvement from Paramount Pictures through their Canadian based division Famous Players Ltd alongside the Canadian Film Development Corporation who also provided tax-shelter backing.

=== Development and writing ===
The production companies allotted Louis Malle the money to make a film with the stipulation that it be made before the year 1979 ended. Malle had a difficult time finding the right script to direct and with time running out his then girlfriend Susan Sarandon suggested using a story written by her friend John Guare, a playwright most notable for his plays House of Blue Leaves and Marco Polo Sings a Solo. Guare suggested that the story take place in Atlantic City, which was still for the most part suffering from the urban deterioration that prompted the legalization of gambling as a solution to save the city. The three met over dinner in early 1979 to work out quirks in the script and began shooting within a few months.

=== Casting ===
Aside from Burt Lancaster, Susan Sarandon, and local extras, most of the cast originated from Canada or France. The film allowed Canadian actors such as Al Waxman to successfully transition into American film and television roles.

=== Filming ===
Principal photography commenced on October 31, 1979, and was largely finished by December 30 (although a few exterior and location shots were filmed until January 5, 1980). Malle filmed at an opportune time in that he was able to capture old Atlantic City: gambling was still in its early stages there, with only two casino hotels open (Resorts and Caesars; Bally's Park Place opened on December 30 toward the end of the principal photography). Most of the city's old resorts and entertainment piers were still standing, albeit in a severe state of disrepair. Within a couple of years of the filming, most of these old hotels would fall victim to the wrecking ball as they were replaced with new casinos. To frame the picture, Malle foreshadows the great transition of the famous resort town in the opening credits by featuring footage of the implosion of the once-grand and historic Traymore Hotel on the Atlantic City Boardwalk.

The opening shot of the old Traymore Hotel being demolished is shown to convey the notion that the city's old hotels were being demolished to make way for the new casinos. However, the Traymore was in fact demolished in 1972, years before the gambling referendum passed in New Jersey. The referendum passed in 1976 and the first hotel to open up was Resorts, formerly the Chalfonte-Haddon Hall, in 1978.

When Dave and Chrissie are seen hitchhiking into Atlantic City from Philadelphia, they pass a large model elephant on their way into town. The elephant, named Lucy, was a tourist attraction built in 1881 to lure potential land buyers to South Atlantic City (now called Margate), a small town south of Atlantic City. The model elephant had been left to deteriorate over the years; on the brink of its demolition in 1971, the residents of Margate had raised the money to have it restored. Today, Lucy still stands in Margate and is on the National Register of Historic Places.

The club where Dave and Lou meet was Club Harlem, which opened in 1935 on Kentucky Avenue, and became the premier nightclub for black tourists visiting Atlantic City. The club opened and closed frequently from 1968 on and eventually closed forever at the end of the eighties. It was torn down in 1992.

Scenes also were shot in the Knife and Fork Inn and White House Sub Shop, both landmarks in Atlantic City.

=== Music ===
Louis Malle hired composer Michel Legrand to write a score for the film, which he did. In the end, however, Malle decided against using a score, and opted for all the music in the film to be diegetic: the only music used is that which exists in the world of the characters (i.e. radios, musical instruments, etc.). The music that Susan Sarandon's character plays from her tape player is the aria "Casta Diva" from Vincenzo Bellini's opera Norma. Featured in the beginning of the film, when Dave and Chrissie enter Resorts, and during the credits is the song On the Boardwalk (In Atlantic City).

== Reception ==
Writing for The New Yorker, Pauline Kael described the film as "a prankish wish-fullfillment fantasy about prosperity: what it does to cities, what it can do for people." She goes on to say "that sometimes the most pleasurable movies seem very slight, because they don't wham you on the noggin."

Atlantic City opened to widespread critical acclaim. On Rotten Tomatoes, the film holds a 100% "Fresh" rating out of 35 critics' reviews. The critics consensus reads "Bittersweet and reflective, Atlantic City is a modest romance given raw power by Burt Lancaster and Susan Sarandon's heartfelt performances along with director Louis Malle's eccentric eye for detail." Metacritic, which uses a weighted average, assigned the film a score of 85 out of 100, based on 15 critics, indicating "universal acclaim".

== Versions ==
There are actually two slightly different versions of the film, one released in America and the other in France. The French version has a few extra short scenes, mostly at the beginning, and somewhat different editing, most notably in the section showing the drug drop off in Philadelphia and Dave and Chrissie making their way to Atlantic City on the road. The edits are minor and mostly affect comic timing, not plot.

=== Awards and nominations ===
Award	Category	Recipient	Result
Academy Awards	Best Picture	Denis Héroux and John Kemeny	Nominated
Academy Awards	Best Director	Louis Malle	Nominated
Academy Awards	Best Actor	Burt Lancaster	Nominated
Academy Awards	Best Actress	Susan Sarandon	Nominated
Academy Awards	Best Screenplay – Written Directly for the Screen	John Guare	Nominated
Boston Society of Film Critics Awards	Best Actor	Burt Lancaster	Won
British Academy Film Awards	Best Film	Denis Héroux	Nominated
British Academy Film Awards	Best Direction	Louis Malle	Won
British Academy Film Awards	Best Actor in a Leading Role	Burt Lancaster	Won
British Academy Film Awards	Best Screenplay	John Guare	Nominated
British Society of Cinematographers Awards	Best Cinematography in a Theatrical Feature Film	Richard Ciupka	Nominated
César Awards	Best Screenplay, Dialogue or Adaptation	John Guare	Nominated
César Awards	Best Music	Michel Legrand	Nominated
David di Donatello Awards	Best Foreign Actor	Burt Lancaster	Won
David di Donatello Awards	Best Foreign Actress	Susan Sarandon	Nominated
Directors Guild of America Awards	Outstanding Directorial Achievement in Motion Pictures	Louis Malle	Nominated
Fotogramas de Plata	Best Foreign Film	Louis Malle	Won (Note: Tied with Fedora.)
Fotogramas de Plata	Best Foreign Movie Performer	Burt Lancaster	Won
Genie Awards	Best Actor in a Supporting Role	Robert Joy	Nominated
Genie Awards	Best Actress in a Supporting Role	Kate Reid	Won
Genie Awards	Best Foreign Actor	Burt Lancaster	Nominated
Genie Awards	Best Foreign Actress	Susan Sarandon	Won
Genie Awards	Best Art Direction	Anne Pritchard	Won
Genie Awards	Bes Cinematography	Richard Ciupka	Nominated
Genie Awards	Best Costume Design	François Barbeau	Nominated
Golden Globe Awards	Best Foreign Film		Nominated
Golden Globe Awards	Best Actor in a Motion Picture – Drama	Burt Lancaster	Nominated
Golden Globe Awards	Best Director – Motion Picture	Louis Malle	Nominated
Kansas City Film Critics Circle Awards	Best Actor	Burt Lancaster	Won
Kansas City Film Critics Circle Awards	Best Actress	Susan Sarandon	Won
Los Angeles Film Critics Association Awards	Best Film		Won
Los Angeles Film Critics Association Awards	Best Actor	Burt Lancaster	Won
Los Angeles Film Critics Association Awards	Best Screenplay	John Guare	Won
Los Angeles Film Critics Association Awards	New Generation Award	John Guare	Won
National Board of Review Awards	Top Ten Films		2nd Place
National Film Preservation Board	National Film Registry		Inducted
National Society of Film Critics Awards	Best Film		Won
National Society of Film Critics Awards	Best Director	Louis Malle	Won
National Society of Film Critics Awards	Best Actor	Burt Lancaster	Won
National Society of Film Critics Awards	Best Screenplay	John Guare	Won
New York Film Critics Circle Awards	Best Film		Runner-up
New York Film Critics Circle Awards	Best Director	Louis Malle	Runner-up
New York Film Critics Circle Awards	Best Actor	Burt Lancaster	Won
New York Film Critics Circle Awards	Best Screenplay	John Guare	Won
Sant Jordi Awards	Best Foreign Film	Louis Malle	Won
Venice International Film Festival	Golden Lion	Louis Malle	Won (Note: Tied with Gloria.)
Writers Guild of America Awards	Best Drama – Written Directly for the Screen	John Guare	Nominated
