= Absence of Malice =

1981 film by Sydney Pollack

- Promotional poster
- Directed by: Sydney Pollack
- Written by: Kurt Luedtke; David Rayfiel (uncredited)
- Produced by: Sydney Pollack; Ronald L. Schwary
- Starring: Paul Newman; Sally Field
- Cinematography: Owen Roizman
- Edited by: Sheldon Kahn
- Music by: Dave Grusin
- Color process: Color by DeLuxe
- Production company: Mirage Enterprises
- Distributed by: Columbia Pictures
- Release date: December 18, 1981
- Running time: 116 minutes
- Country: United States
- Language: English
- Box office: $40.7 million

Absence of Malice is a 1981 American neo noir thriller film directed by Sydney Pollack and starring Paul Newman, Sally Field, Wilford Brimley, Melinda Dillon and Bob Balaban.

The title refers to one of the defenses against libel defamation. It is used in journalism classes to illustrate the conflict between disclosing damaging personal information and the public's right to know.

== Plot ==
Miami liquor wholesaler Michael Gallagher, the son of a deceased criminal, finds himself a front-page story in the local newspaper which reports he's being investigated in the disappearance of longshoremans' union official Joey Diaz. Reporter Megan Carter was tipped to the story by a file left intentionally on the desktop of federal prosecutor Elliot Rosen, who leaked the bogus investigation in order to pressure Gallagher for information.

Gallagher confronts Carter, who refuses to reveal her source. Gallagher's business is shut down by union officials, who believe the phony story of his involvement in Diaz's disappearance. Gallagher's uncle, local crime boss Malderone, has him followed in case he talks to the government.

Teresa Perrone, a friend of Gallagher's, tells Carter he couldn't have murdered Diaz because he took her out of town to get an abortion that weekend. The devoutly Catholic Perrone asks Carter not to reveal the abortion, but Carter includes it in a published report. When Carter learns from her editor that Perrone committed suicide, she attempts to apologize in person to Gallagher and is physically assaulted. She attempts to atone by revealing Rosen's role in the investigation.

Gallagher arranges a secret meeting with District Attorney Quinn, and agrees to use his organized-crime contacts to obtain information on Diaz's disappearance for Quinn in exchange for exoneration. He makes anonymous contributions to one of Quinn's political action committee backers and begins a love affair with Carter.

Rosen is mystified by Quinn's exoneration of Gallagher and taps both their phones and surveils their movements. He and federal agent Bob Waddell obtain evidence of Gallagher's donations to Quinn's political committee and discover Gallagher and Carter's romantic relationship. Waddell warns Carter about the investigation, but she breaks the story that the federal strike force is investigating Gallagher's attempt to bribe the D.A. The story becomes front page news again. Assistant US Attorney General Wells calls the principals together and offers them a choice between going before a grand jury or informally making their case to him. Rosen questions Gallagher but it becomes apparent that he has no case, and Carter reveals Rosen left Gallagher's file open on his desk for her to read.

Wells suggests Quinn resign over Gallagher's legal donations to the political committee and the perception it resulted in Gallagher's exoneration. Wells, unable to prove Gallagher set everything up, drops his investigation and fires Rosen for malfeasance. The newspaper prints a story setting the record straight.

Carter and Gallagher have a cordial conversation on the wharf before Gallagher sails away from the city.

== Cast ==
- Paul Newman as Michael Gallagher
- Sally Field as Megan Carter
- Bob Balaban as Elliot Rosen
- Melinda Dillon as Teresa Perrone
- Luther Adler as Malderone
- Barry Primus as Waddell
- Josef Sommer as McAdam
- John Harkins as Davidek
- Don Hood as Quinn
- Wilford Brimley as Wells

== Production ==
The movie was written by Kurt Luedtke, a former newspaper editor, and David Rayfiel (uncredited). Newman said that the film was a "direct attack on the New York Post," which had earlier published a caption for a photo of Newman that he said was inaccurate. Because of the dispute, the Post banned Newman from its pages, even removing his name from movies in the TV listings.

Filming took place on location around South Florida in the cities of Coral Gables and Miami, and in the Biscayne Bay.

== Reception ==
=== Critical response ===
Absence of Malice received mostly positive reviews. Newman and Dillon's performances were praised, as was Brimley's cameo. Many reviewers compared the film to the 1976 Oscar-winner All the President's Men. In his review, Time magazine's Richard Schickel wrote "Absence of Malice does not invalidate All the President's Men. But with entertainment values – and a moral sense – every bit as high as that film's, it observes that there is an underside to journalistic gallantry." Similarly, Variety called it "a splendidly disturbing look at the power of sloppy reporting to inflict harm on the innocent."

The Chicago Sun-Times' Roger Ebert wrote that some may take the approach "that no respectable journalist would ever do the things that Sally Field does about, to, and with Paul Newman in this movie. She is a disgrace to her profession." Instead he preferred a "romantic" approach, writing that he "liked this movie despite its factual and ethical problems" and was not "even so sure they matter so much to most viewers". Janet Maslin of The New York Times found the movie "lacking in momentum", but praised its "quiet gravity". Although Pauline Kael described the film as only "moderately entertaining", she offered higher praise for Newman's "sly, compact performance" and particularly for "the marvelously inventive acting of Melinda Dillon".

Rotten Tomatoes gives the film a score of 82% based on reviews from 28 critics, with an average score of 6.8/10.

=== Academic use ===
Absence of Malice has been used in journalism and public administration courses to illustrate professional errors such as writing a story without seeking confirmation and having a romantic relationship with a source.

=== Box office ===
The film was a box office success. Film Comment said "It was the first picture in ages that had Newman playing opposite a strong female co-star in a romantic vein and Columbia astutely capitalized on public desire to see Newman in such a role again."

=== Accolades ===
Award	Category	Nominee(s)	Result	Ref.
Academy Awards	Best Actor	Paul Newman	Nominated	
Academy Awards	Best Supporting Actress	Melinda Dillon	Nominated	
Academy Awards	Best Screenplay – Written Directly for the Screen	Kurt Luedtke	Nominated	
Berlin International Film Festival	Golden Bear	Sydney Pollack	Nominated	
Berlin International Film Festival	Honourable Mention	Sydney Pollack	Won	
Berlin International Film Festival	Reader Jury of the "Berliner Morgenpost"	Sydney Pollack	Won	
Golden Globe Awards	Best Actress in a Motion Picture – Drama	Sally Field	Nominated	
Golden Globe Awards	Best Screenplay – Motion Picture	Kurt Luedtke	Nominated	
Kansas City Film Critics Circle Awards	Best Supporting Actress	Melinda Dillon	Won	
Los Angeles Film Critics Association Awards	Best Supporting Actress	Melinda Dillon	Runner-up	
Writers Guild of America Awards	Best Drama – Written Directly for the Screen	Kurt Luedtke	Nominated	
