= Interiors =

1978 film by Woody Allen

- Theatrical release poster
- Directed by: Woody Allen
- Written by: Woody Allen
- Produced by: Charles H. Joffe
- Starring: Kristin Griffith; Mary Beth Hurt; Richard Jordan; Diane Keaton; E. G. Marshall; Geraldine Page; Maureen Stapleton; Sam Waterston
- Cinematography: Gordon Willis
- Edited by: Ralph Rosenblum
- Production company: Jack Rollins–Charles H. Joffe Productions
- Distributed by: United Artists
- Release date: August 2, 1978
- Running time: 92 minutes
- Country: United States
- Language: English
- Budget: $3.1 million
- Box office: $10.4 million

Interiors is a 1978 American drama film written and directed by Woody Allen. It stars Kristin Griffith, Mary Beth Hurt, Richard Jordan, Diane Keaton, E. G. Marshall, Geraldine Page, Maureen Stapleton, and Sam Waterston.

The film was released in the United States on August 2, 1978, by United Artists. Allen's first full-fledged film in the drama genre, it was met with acclaim from critics. It received five Academy Award nominations, including Best Director, Best Original Screenplay (both for Allen), Best Actress (Page), and Best Supporting Actress (Stapleton). Page also won the BAFTA Film Award for Best Supporting Actress.

== Plot ==
Arthur, a corporate attorney, and Eve, an interior decorator, are the parents of three adult daughters. Renata, the eldest daughter, is a poet whose husband Frederick, a struggling writer, feels eclipsed by her success. Flyn, the youngest daughter, is an actress who is away most of the time filming; the low quality of her films is an object of ridicule behind her back. The middle daughter, Joey, who is in a relationship with Mike, cannot settle on a career, and resents her mother for favoring Renata, while Renata resents their father's concern over Joey's lack of direction.

One morning, Arthur unexpectedly announces that he wants a separation from his wife and would like to live alone. Eve, who is clinically depressed, attempts suicide in her new Manhattan apartment. The shock of these two events causes a rift among the sisters. Arthur returns from a trip to Greece with Pearl, a high-spirited and more "normal" woman, whom he intends to marry. His daughters are disturbed that Arthur would disregard Eve's suicide attempt and find another woman, to whom Joey refers as a "vulgarian".

Arthur and Pearl marry at the family's Long Island beach house, with Renata, Joey, and Flyn in attendance. Later in the evening, Joey lashes out at Pearl when Pearl accidentally breaks one of Eve's vases. In the middle of the night, Flyn inhales cocaine in the garage and Frederick drunkenly attempts to rape her, but she manages to escape. Meanwhile, Joey finds Eve in the house, and sadly explains how much she has given up for her mother, and how disdainfully she is treated. Eve walks out onto the beach and into the surf. Joey unsuccessfully attempts to save Eve, but nearly drowns in the process. Mike rescues Joey, pulling her to shore, and Pearl resuscitates her via mouth-to-mouth.

The family attends Eve's funeral, each placing a single white rose—Eve's favorite flower and a symbol of hope to her—on Eve's wooden coffin, after which the three sisters look out at the sea from their former family beach house and comment on the peacefulness of the sea.

== Cast ==
- Kristin Griffith as Flyn
- Mary Beth Hurt as Joey
- Richard Jordan as Frederick
- Diane Keaton as Renata
- E. G. Marshall as Arthur
- Geraldine Page as Eve
- Maureen Stapleton as Pearl
- Sam Waterston as Mike

== Reception ==
=== Box office ===
Interiors grossed $10.4 million in the United States and Canada.

=== Critical response ===
On the review aggregator website Rotten Tomatoes, the film holds an approval rating of 78% based 18 reviews, with an average rating of 6.9/10. On Metacritic, which assigns a weighted average score out of 100 to reviews from mainstream critics, the film received an average score of 67 out of 100, based on 9 critics, indicating "generally favorable" reviews.

Vincent Canby of The New York Times called the film "beautiful" and complimented Gordon Willis on his "use of cool colors that suggest civilization's precarious control of natural forces", but noted:

My problem with Interiors is that although I admire the performances and isolated moments ... I haven't any real idea what the film is up to. It's almost as if Mr. Allen had set out to make someone else's movie, say a film in the manner of Mr. Bergman, without having any grasp of the material, or first-hand, gut feelings about the characters. They seem like other people's characters, known only through other people's art.

Richard Schickel of Time wrote that the film's "desperate sobriety ... robs it of energy and passion"; Allen's "style is Bergmanesque, but his material is Mankiewiczian, and the discontinuity is fatal. Doubtless this was a necessary movie for Allen, but it is both unnecessary and a minor embarrassment for his well-wishers."

Roger Ebert gave the film four stars and praised it highly, writing, "Here we have a Woody Allen film, and we're talking about O'Neill and Bergman and traditions and influences? Yes, and correctly. Allen, whose comedies have been among the cheerful tonics of recent years, is astonishingly assured in his first drama."

Gene Siskel awarded three stars out of four and wrote:

I thought the unremitting pain of the first half of the film was almost laughable, as if Allen had made a bad Bergman film. I thoroughly enjoyed the second half, in which the film's only bright, lively character (Maureen Stapleton as the father's new, romantic interest) makes her entrance. At the end, I left the theater thinking that the picture was painful and didn't have much applicability to my life, but that I would always remember its characters more for the superb acting than for Allen's script.

Charles Champlin called the film "somber, intense and stunning", concluding, "Like Cries and Whispers, Allen's Interiors is, for all the somberness of the material, in the end an affirmation of life and a transcendent piece of art. The film lovers will love it if joke-seekers do not.

Penelope Gilliatt of The New Yorker wrote: "This droll piece of work is [Allen's] most majestic so far. The theme its characters express is very Chekhovian. It is pinned to the idea that the hardest, and most admirable thing to do is to act properly through a whole life."

James Monaco, in his 1979 book American Film Now, described Interiors as "the most pretentious film by a major American filmmaker in the last thirty years" alongside Mickey One (1965).

In 2016, Interiors was listed as Allen's 11th best film in an article by The Daily Telegraph critics Robbie Collin and Tim Robey, who wrote that "the emotional effort being expended is cumulatively hard to shrug off" and praised Stapleton's performance.

=== Woody Allen's response ===
Allen's own fears about the film's reception are recounted in a 1991 biography of Allen by Eric Lax, where he quotes Ralph Rosenblum, the film's editor:

He [Allen] managed to rescue Interiors, much to his credit. He was against the wall. I think he was afraid. He was testy, he was slightly short-tempered. He was fearful. He thought he had a real bomb. But he managed to pull it out with his own work. The day the reviews came out, he said to me, 'Well, we pulled this one out by the short hairs, didn't we?'

Later, while watching the film with an acquaintance, Allen reportedly said, "It's always been my fear. I think I'm writing Long Day's Journey into Night and it turns into Edge of Night."

Looking back on the film in 1982, Allen said:

I should have brought Pearl, Maureen Stapleton's character, in earlier. I thought the audience would be entertained before the nub of conflict emerged. I thought that it was entertaining enough before Pearl entered, but it wasn't. It should have been. I should have started it with Pearl coming in right away and the whole thing would have flowered right from the start.

=== Accolades ===
Award	Category	Recipient(s)	Result
Academy Awards	Best Director	Woody Allen	Nominated
Academy Awards	Best Actress	Geraldine Page	Nominated
Academy Awards	Best Supporting Actress	Maureen Stapleton	Nominated
Academy Awards	Best Screenplay – Written Directly for the Screen	Woody Allen	Nominated
Academy Awards	Best Art Direction	Mel Bourne and Daniel Robert	Nominated
British Academy Film Awards	Best Actress in a Supporting Role	Geraldine Page	Won
British Academy Film Awards	Most Promising Newcomer to Leading Film Roles	Mary Beth Hurt	Nominated
Fotogramas de Plata	Best Foreign Movie Performer	Diane Keaton (also for Looking for Mr. Goodbar)	Won
Golden Globe Awards	Best Actress in a Motion Picture – Drama	Geraldine Page	Nominated
Golden Globe Awards	Best Supporting Actress – Motion Picture	Maureen Stapleton	Nominated
Golden Globe Awards	Best Director – Motion Picture	Woody Allen	Nominated
Golden Globe Awards	Best Screenplay – Motion Picture	Woody Allen	Nominated
Jupiter Awards	Best International Actress	Diane Keaton	Nominated
Kansas City Film Critics Circle Awards	Best Film		Won
Kansas City Film Critics Circle Awards	Best Director	Woody Allen	Won
Kansas City Film Critics Circle Awards	Best Actress	Geraldine Page	Won
Los Angeles Film Critics Association Awards	Best Director	Woody Allen	Runner-up
Los Angeles Film Critics Association Awards	Best Supporting Actress	Geraldine Page	Nominated
Los Angeles Film Critics Association Awards	Best Supporting Actress	Maureen Stapleton	Won (Note: Tied with Mona Washbourne for Stevie)
Los Angeles Film Critics Association Awards	Best Screenplay	Woody Allen	Runner-up
National Board of Review Awards	Top Ten Films		3rd Place
National Society of Film Critics Awards	Best Supporting Actress	Maureen Stapleton	Runner-up
National Society of Film Critics Awards	Best Screenplay	Woody Allen	5th Place
New York Film Critics Circle Awards	Best Supporting Actress	Maureen Stapleton	Won
Sant Jordi Awards	Best Foreign Film	Woody Allen	Won
Writers Guild of America Awards	Best Drama Written Directly for the Screen	Woody Allen	Nominated

== Soundtrack ==
- "Keepin' Out of Mischief Now" (1932) – Written by Fats Waller & Andy Razaf – Performed by Tommy Dorsey & His Orchestra
- "Wolverine Blues" (1923) – Written by Ferdinand Morton – Performed by The World's Greatest Jazz Band

== Popular culture ==
The plot and characters of Interiors are alluded to in the Death Cab for Cutie song "Death of an Interior Decorator", taken from the 2003 album Transatlanticism.
