= Dorothy Frooks =

American journalist

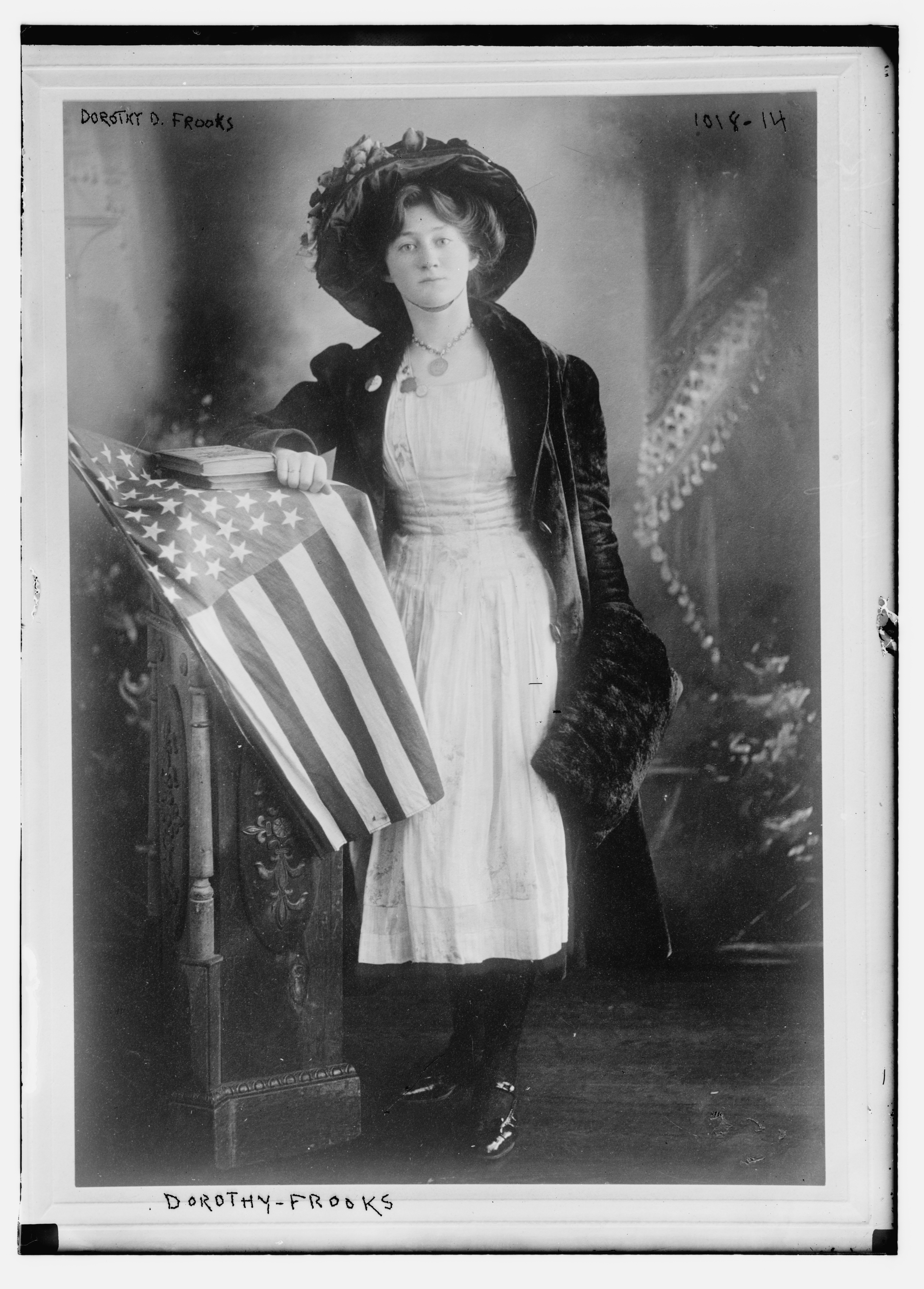
- Born: February 12, 1896; Saugerties, New York, U.S.
- Died: April 13, 1997 (aged 101); New York City, U.S.
- Occupations: Author, publisher, lawyer
- Known for: Political and social activism
- Spouse: Jay P. Vanderbilt (m. 1986)

Dorothy Frooks (February 12, 1896 – April 13, 1997) was an American writer, publisher, military officer, lawyer, and suffragist. She also ran for Congress twice, in 1920 as a member of the Prohibition Party and in 1934 on the Law Preservation ticket for New York's At-large congressional district.

She worked as a writer for the New York Evening World and published the Murray Hill News in 1952. She also wrote Labor Courts Outlaw Strikes, a pamphlet calling for the establishment of a labor court.

A lawyer in Peekskill, New York, she wrote numerous fiction and nonfiction books, including The Olympic Torch, The American Heart, and an autobiography, Lady Lawyer.

== Life and law career ==
Dorothy Frooks was born on February 12, 1896, on a farm near Saugerties, New York. She was one of ten children of Reginald Frooks, a successful businessman, and Rosita Siberz, an international socialite. She and her siblings were raised on a 400-acre (160 ha) farm in the Hudson Valley, and spent their winters in the Waldorf Hotel.

She was recruited by her mother's London society friends to give street-corner speeches at the age of 11.

In 1919, Frooks graduated from the Hamilton College of Law in Chicago and then went on to receive her master's degree from New York University. By the early 1920s, she was the first full-time lawyer for the Salvation Army.

== Military career ==
Frooks served as chief yeoman in the United States Navy during World War I and as a judge advocate in the United States Army during World War II.

She served as the National Commander of the Women World War Veterans and worked with the Veterans of World War I and the Retreads, an organization for veterans who served in both world wars.

== Reds ==
Frooks appeared as one of the "Witnesses" in Warren Beatty's 1981 film Reds, along with fellow centenarian radicals Scott Nearing and George Seldes. Frooks, Nearing and Seldes were all firsthand witnesses of the red-baiting, McCarthyism, and Cold War hysteria of the 1950s.

== Death ==
Frooks died in 1997, at the age of 101, and was interred in Calverton National Cemetery.
