= 1978 Los Angeles Film Critics Association Awards =

Annual US film awards ceremony

4th LAFCA Awards
- Date: December 16, 1978

Highlights
- Best Picture: Coming Home

The 4th Los Angeles Film Critics Association Awards, honoring the best in film for 1978, were announced on 16 December 1978.

== Winners ==
- Best Picture:
  - Coming Home
- Best Director:
  - Michael Cimino – The Deer Hunter
  - Runners-up: Woody Allen – Interiors and Alan Parker – Midnight Express
- Best Actor:
  - Jon Voight – Coming Home
  - Runner-up: Gary Busey – The Buddy Holly Story
- Best Actress:
  - Jane Fonda – Coming Home, Comes a Horseman and California Suite
  - Runner-up: Ingrid Bergman – Autumn Sonata (Höstsonaten)
- Best Supporting Actor:
  - Robert Morley – Who Is Killing the Great Chefs of Europe?
- Best Supporting Actress (tie):
  - Maureen Stapleton – Interiors
  - Mona Washbourne – Stevie
- Best Screenplay:
  - Paul Mazursky – An Unmarried Woman
  - Runners-up: Woody Allen – Interiors and Larry Gelbart and Sheldon Keller – Movie Movie
- Best Cinematography:
  - Néstor Almendros – Days of Heaven
  - Runners-up: Sven Nykvist – Pretty Baby
- Best Music Score:
  - Giorgio Moroder – Midnight Express
- Best Foreign Film:
  - Madame Rosa (La vie devant soi) • France
- New Generation Award:
  - Gary Busey
- Career Achievement Award:
  - Orson Welles
