= Stevie (1978 film) =

Film by Robert Enders

- Theatrical release poster
- Directed by: Robert Enders
- Screenplay by: Hugh Whitemore
- Based on: Stevie by Hugh Whitemore; The works of Stevie Smith
- Produced by: Robert Enders
- Starring: Glenda Jackson; Mona Washbourne; Alec McCowen; Trevor Howard
- Cinematography: Freddie Young
- Edited by: Peter Tanner
- Music by: Patrick Gowers
- Production companies: First Artists; Bowden Productions Limited
- Distributed by: Enterprise Pictures Limited (United Kingdom); First Artists (United States)
- Release dates: 30 August 1978 (MWFF); 13 September 1978 (Los Angeles)
- Running time: 102 minutes
- Countries: United Kingdom; United States
- Language: English

Stevie is a 1978 biographical drama film produced and directed by Robert Enders from a screenplay by Hugh Whitemore, based on Whitemore's 1977 play of the same name. The film stars Glenda Jackson, Trevor Howard, Mona Washbourne and Alec McCowen.

== Synopsis ==
The film is about the life of British poet Stevie Smith and centres on Smith's relationship with her aunt, with whom she lived for many years in a house in Palmers Green, London.

== Cast ==
- Glenda Jackson as Stevie Smith
- Trevor Howard as The Man
- Mona Washbourne as Aunt
- Alec McCowen as Freddy
- Emma Louise Fox as Stevie as child

== Release ==
Stevie had its world premiere at the Montreal World Film Festival on 30 August 1978. The film was released in Los Angeles on 13 September 1978 by First Artists. After The Samuel Goldwyn Company acquired the distribution rights from First Artists, the film was released in New York City on 19 June 1981. It was distributed by Hoyts in Australia and by Universal Pictures internationally.

== Reception ==
=== Critical response ===
On the review aggregator website Rotten Tomatoes, the film holds an approval rating of 60% based on 10 reviews. Chicago Sun-Times film critic Roger Ebert rated the film four out of four stars and wrote that "it contains one of Glenda Jackson's greatest performances. She knows this character well. [...] She does what great actors can do: She takes a character who might seem uninteresting, and makes us care deeply about the uneventful days of her life." Linda Deutsch, writing for the Associated Press, stated: "Stevie is a rare, exquisite little movie which grows in stature as it lingers in memory", and continued, "Glenda Jackson, in another of those amazing portrayals which make her an actress beyond compare, turns Stevie's rather humdrum existence into a dazzling study of love, anguish and small savored moments of joy."

=== Accolades ===
Award	Category	Nominee(s)	Result	Ref.
Boston Society of Film Critics Awards	Best Supporting Actress	Mona Washbourne	Won	
British Academy Film Awards	Best Supporting Actress	Mona Washbourne	Nominated	
Golden Globe Awards	Best Actress in a Motion Picture – Drama	Glenda Jackson	Nominated	
Golden Globe Awards	Best Supporting Actress	Mona Washbourne	Nominated	
Los Angeles Film Critics Association Awards	Best Supporting Actress	Mona Washbourne	Won (Note: Tied with Maureen Stapleton for Interiors)	
National Board of Review Awards	Top Ten Films		Won	
National Board of Review Awards	Best Actress	Glenda Jackson	Won	
National Board of Review Awards	Best Supporting Actress	Mona Washbourne	Won	
National Society of Film Critics Awards	Best Supporting Actress	Mona Washbourne	Nominated	
New York Film Critics Circle Awards	Best Actress	Glenda Jackson	Won	
New York Film Critics Circle Awards	Best Supporting Actress	Mona Washbourne	Won	
