= Mona Washbourne =

English actress (1903–1988)

- Born: Mona Lee Washbourne; 27 November 1903; Solihull, Warwickshire, England
- Died: 15 November 1988 (aged 84); London, England
- Occupation: Actress
- Years active: 1924–1984
- Spouse: Basil Dignam (m. 1940; died 1979)

Mona Lee Washbourne (27 November 1903 – 15 November 1988) was an English actress of stage, film, and television. Her most critically acclaimed role was in the film Stevie (1978), late in her career, for which she was nominated for a Golden Globe Award and a BAFTA Award. She had, in 1977, won the Laurence Olivier Award for Best Actress in a Supporting Role for her performance in the play it was based on.

== Early life ==
Mona Washbourne was born in Sparkhill, Birmingham, and began her entertaining career training as a concert pianist. Her sister Kathleen Washbourne was a violinist with the BBC Symphony Orchestra under Sir Adrian Boult.

== Career ==
Washbourne was performing professionally from the early 1920s. She married the actor Basil Dignam. Her brother-in-law Mark Dignam was also a stage and film actor. In 1948, after numerous stage musical performances, Washbourne began appearing in films. Her film credits include the horror movie The Brides of Dracula, Billy Liar (1963) and The Collector (1965). She is probably best known to American audiences for her role as housekeeper Mrs. Pearce in My Fair Lady (1964). She also appeared as the stern and caustic Mrs. Bramson in the remake of Night Must Fall (also 1964), and the Matron in the film, If.... (1968).

She appeared at both the Royal Court Theatre in London and on Broadway in 1970 in David Storey's Home. She was nominated for the Tony Award for Best Performance by a Featured Actress in a Play. In 1975 she appeared on the West End stage with James Stewart in a revival of Mary Chase's play Harvey, in the role originally taken by Josephine Hull. Washbourne won the 1981 New York Film Critics' Circle Awards for Best Supporting Actress in Stevie (1978).

== Later life ==
In 1981, Washbourne appeared in Granada Television's TV miniseries adaptation of Evelyn Waugh's novel Brideshead Revisited as Nanny Hawkins. One of her last television appearances was in Where's the Key? (1983), a BBC play about Alzheimer's disease.

She died in 1988, aged 84, in London.

== Selected filmography ==
- Evergreen (1934) – Barmaid (uncredited)
- The Winslow Boy (1948) – Miss Barnes
- Once Upon a Dream (1949) – Vicar's Wife
- The Huggetts Abroad (1949) – Lugubrious Housewife (uncredited)
- Adam and Evelyne (1949) – Mrs. Salop – Lady Gambler (uncredited)
- Maytime in Mayfair (1949) – Lady Leveson
- Double Confession (1950) – Fussy Mother
- Dark Interval (1950) (unspecified role)
- The Gambler and the Lady (1952) – Miss Minter
- Johnny on the Run (1953) – Mrs. MacGregor
- Adventure in the Hopfields (1954) – Mrs. McBain
- The Million Pound Note (1954) – Mum with Pram (uncredited)
- Star of My Night (1954) – Bit Part (uncredited)
- Doctor in the House (1954) – Midwifery Sister (uncredited)
- Betrayed (1954) – Waitress (uncredited)
- Child's Play (1954) – Miss Emily Goslett
- To Dorothy a Son (1954) – Mid Wife Appleby.
- John and Julie (1955) – Miss Rendlesham
- Cast a Dark Shadow (1955) – Monica Bare
- Alias John Preston (1955) – (uncredited)
- The Vise (1955) – Supporting Role (episode "Count of Twelve")
- Lost (1956) – Library Manageress (uncredited)
- Yield to the Night (1956) – Mrs. Thomas, landlady
- Loser Takes All (1956) – Nurse (uncredited)
- Circus Friends (1956) – Miss Linstead
- It's Great to Be Young (1956) – Miss Morrow, School Mistress
- The Good Companions (1957) – Mrs. Joe Brundit
- Stranger in Town (1957) – Agnes Smith
- Son of a Stranger (1957)
- Dunkirk (1958) – Worker Who Speaks to Holden (uncredited)
- A Cry from the Streets (1958) – Mrs. Daniels
- Count Your Blessings (1959) – Nanny
- The Brides of Dracula (1960) – Frau Lang
- No Love for Johnnie (1961) – Well-wisher at Railway Station (uncredited)
- Billy Liar (1963) – Alice Fisher
- Night Must Fall (1964) – Mrs. Bramson
- My Fair Lady (1964) – Mrs. Pearce
- Ferry Cross the Mersey (1965) – Aunt Lil
- One Way Pendulum (1965) – Aunt Mildred
- The Collector (1965) – Aunt Annie
- The Third Day (1965) – Catherine Parsons
- Casino Royale (1967) – Tea Lady (uncredited)
- Two a Penny (1968) – Mrs. Duckett
- Mrs. Brown, You've Got a Lovely Daughter (1968) – Mrs. Brown
- If.... (1968) – Matron: Staff
- The Bed Sitting Room (1969) – Mother
- The Games (1970) – Mrs. Hayes
- Fragment of Fear (1970) – Mrs. Gray
- What Became of Jack and Jill? (1972) – Gran Alice Tallent
- O Lucky Man! (1973) – Neighbour / Usher / Sister Hallett
- Identikit (1974) – Mrs. Helen Fiedke
- The Old Curiosity Shop (1975) – Mrs. Jarley
- The Blue Bird (1976) – Grandmother
- Stevie (1978) – Aunt
- The London Connection (1979) – Aunt Lydia
- Shillingbury Tales ('The Shillingbury Daydream', episode) (1981) - Marjorie Cavendish
- Brideshead Revisited (1981) – Nanny Hawkins
- Charles & Diana: A Royal Love Story (1982) – Queen Elizabeth The Queen Mother

== Awards and nominations ==
=== Film ===
| Year | Award | Category | Nominated work | Result | Ref. |
|---|---|---|---|---|---|
| 1981 | Boston Society of Film Critics Awards | Best Supporting Actress | Stevie | Won | |
| 1978 | British Academy Film Awards | Best Actress in a Supporting Role | Stevie | Nominated | |
| 1978 | Golden Globe Awards | Best Supporting Actress – Motion Picture | Stevie | Nominated | |
| 1978 | Los Angeles Film Critics Association Awards | Best Supporting Actress | Stevie | Won (Note: Tied with Maureen Stapleton for Interiors) | |
| 1981 | National Board of Review Awards | Best Supporting Actress | Stevie | Won | |
| 1981 | National Society of Film Critics Awards | Best Supporting Actress | Stevie | 2nd Place | |
| 1981 | New York Film Critics Circle Awards | Best Supporting Actress | Stevie | Won | |

=== Theatre ===
| Year | Award | Category | Nominated work | Result | Ref. |
|---|---|---|---|---|---|
| 1977 | Laurence Olivier Awards | Best Actress of the Year in a Supporting Role | Stevie | Won | |
| 1971 | Tony Awards | Best Supporting or Featured Actress in a Play | Home | Nominated | |
