= New York Film Critics Circle Award for Best Supporting Actress =

Annual film award

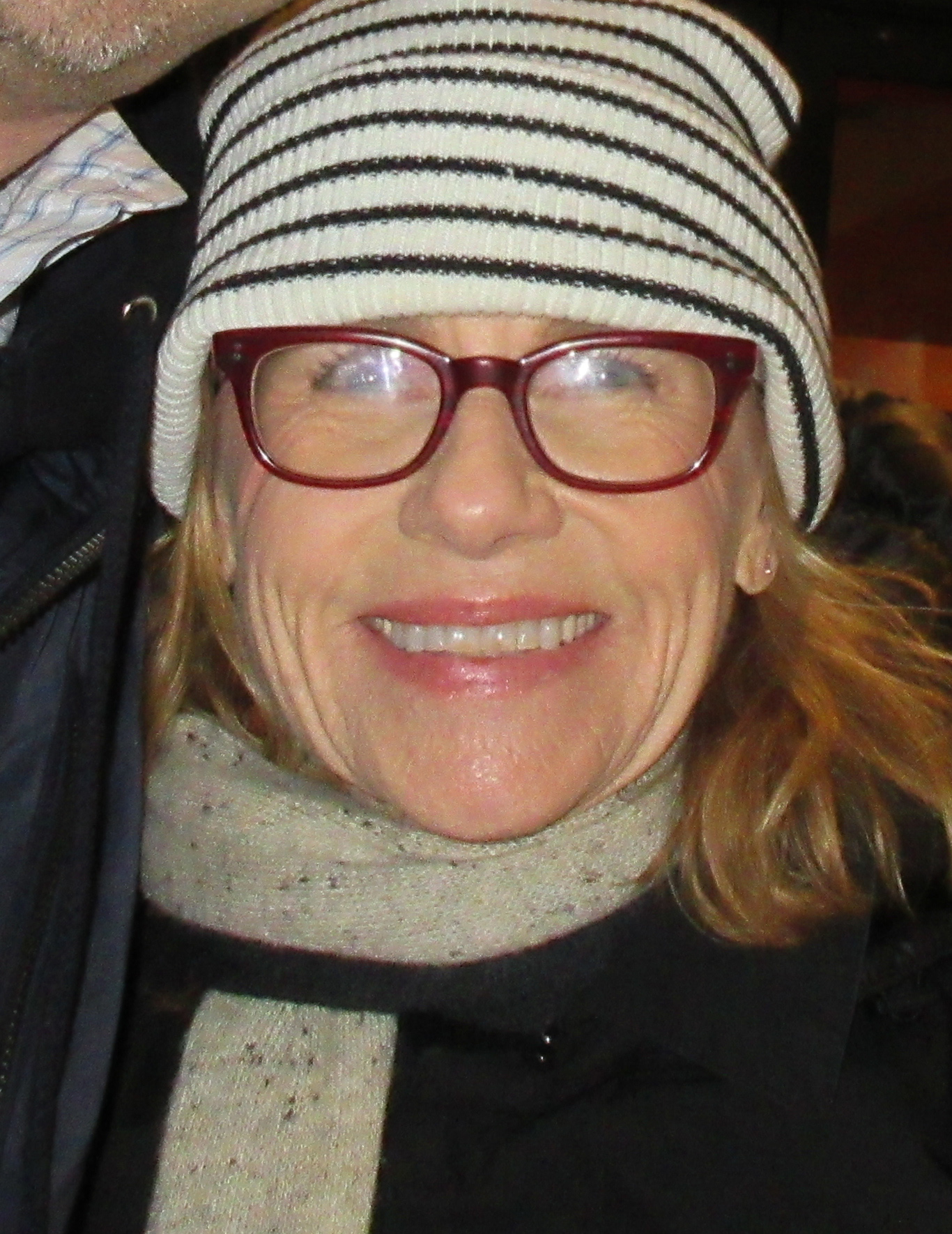
- Current recipient: Amy Madigan
- Awarded for: Best Performance by an Actress in a Supporting Role
- Country: United States
- Presented by: New York Film Critics Circle
- First award: Dyan Cannon; Bob & Carol & Ted & Alice (1969)
- Currently held by: Amy Madigan; Weapons (2025)
- Website: nyfcc.com

The New York Film Critics Circle Award for Best Supporting Actress is an award given by the New York Film Critics Circle, honoring the finest achievements in film-making.

== Winners ==
=== 1960s ===
Year	Winner	Role	Film
1969	Dyan Cannon	Alice Henderson	Bob & Carol & Ted & Alice

=== 1970s ===
Year	Winner	Role	Film
1970	Karen Black	Rayette Dipesto	Five Easy Pieces
1971	Ellen Burstyn	Lois Farrow	The Last Picture Show
1972	Jeannie Berlin	Lila Kolodny	The Heartbreak Kid
1973	Valentina Cortese	Séverine	Day for Night
1974	Valerie Perrine	Honey Bruce	Lenny
1975	Lily Tomlin	Linnea Reese	Nashville
1976	Talia Shire	Adrian Pennino	Rocky
1977	Sissy Spacek	Pinky Rose	3 Women
1978	Maureen Stapleton	Pearl	Interiors
1979	Meryl Streep	Joanna Kramer	Kramer vs. Kramer
1979	Meryl Streep	Karen Traynor	The Seduction of Joe Tynan

=== 1980s ===
Year	Winner	Role	Film
1980	Mary Steenburgen	Lynda Dummar	Melvin and Howard
1981	Mona Washbourne	Aunt	Stevie
1982	Jessica Lange	Julie Nichols	Tootsie
1983	Linda Hunt	Billy Kwan	The Year of Living Dangerously
1984	Christine Lahti	Hazel	Swing Shift
1985	Anjelica Huston	Maerose Prizzi	Prizzi's Honor
1986	Dianne Wiest	Holly	Hannah and Her Sisters
1987	Vanessa Redgrave	Peggy Ramsay	Prick Up Your Ears
1988	Diane Venora	Chan Berg-Parker	Bird
1989	Lena Olin	Masha	Enemies: A Love Story

=== 1990s ===
Year	Winner	Role	Film
1990	Jennifer Jason Leigh	Tralala	Last Exit to Brooklyn
1990	Jennifer Jason Leigh	Susie Waggoner	Miami Blues
1991	Judy Davis	Audrey Taylor	Barton Fink
1991	Judy Davis	Joan Frost / Joan Lee	Naked Lunch
1992	Miranda Richardson	Jude	The Crying Game
1992	Miranda Richardson	Ingrid Fleming	Damage
1992	Miranda Richardson	Rose Arbuthnot	Enchanted April
1993	Gong Li	Juxian	Farewell My Concubine
1994	Dianne Wiest	Helen Sinclair	Bullets Over Broadway
1995	Mira Sorvino	Linda Ash	Mighty Aphrodite
1996	Courtney Love	Althea Leasure-Flynt	The People vs. Larry Flynt
1997	Joan Cusack	Emily Montgomery	In & Out
1998	Lisa Kudrow	Lucia De Lury	The Opposite of Sex
1999	Catherine Keener	Maxine Lund	Being John Malkovich

=== 2000s ===
Year	Winner	Role	Film
2000	Marcia Gay Harden	Lee Krasner-Pollock	Pollock
2001	Helen Mirren	Mrs. Wilson	Gosford Park
2002	Patricia Clarkson	Eleanor Fine	Far from Heaven
2003	Shohreh Aghdashloo	Nadereh Behrani	House of Sand and Fog
2004	Virginia Madsen	Maya Randall	Sideways
2005	Maria Bello	Edie Stall	A History of Violence
2006	Jennifer Hudson	Effie White	Dreamgirls
2007	Amy Ryan	Helene McCready	Gone Baby Gone
2008	Penélope Cruz	María Elena	Vicky Cristina Barcelona
2009	Mo'Nique	Mary Lee Johnston	Precious

=== 2010s ===
Year	Winner	Role	Film
2010	Melissa Leo	Alice Ward	The Fighter
2011	Jessica Chastain	Celia Foote	The Help
2011	Jessica Chastain	Samantha LaForche	Take Shelter
2011	Jessica Chastain	Mrs. O'Brien	The Tree of Life
2012	Sally Field	Mary Todd Lincoln	Lincoln
2013	Jennifer Lawrence	Rosalyn Rosenfeld	American Hustle
2014	Patricia Arquette	Olivia Evans	Boyhood
2015	Kristen Stewart	Valentine	Clouds of Sils Maria
2016	Michelle Williams	Gina Lewis	Certain Women
2016	Michelle Williams	Randi Chandler	Manchester by the Sea
2017	Tiffany Haddish	Dina	Girls Trip
2018	Regina King	Sharon Rivers	If Beale Street Could Talk
2019	Laura Dern	Marmee March	Little Women
2019	Laura Dern	Nora Fanshaw	Marriage Story

=== 2020s ===
Year	Winner	Role	Film
2020	Maria Bakalova	Tutar Sagdiyev	Borat Subsequent Moviefilm
2021	Kathryn Hunter	The Three Witches	The Tragedy of Macbeth
2022	Keke Palmer	Emerald "Em" Haywood	Nope
2023	Da'Vine Joy Randolph	Mary Lamb	The Holdovers
2024	Carol Kane	Carla Kessler	Between the Temples
2025	Amy Madigan	Gladys	Weapons

== Multiple awards ==
=== 2 wins ===
- Dianne Wiest (1986, 1994)

== See also ==
- Academy Award for Best Supporting Actress
- National Board of Review Award for Best Supporting Actress
- National Society of Film Critics Award for Best Supporting Actress
- Los Angeles Film Critics Association Award for Best Supporting Actress
