= Daniel Robert (set decorator) =

American set decorator

- Occupation: Set decorator
- Years active: 1978–2001

Daniel Robert is an American set decorator. He was nominated for an Academy Award in the category Best Art Direction for the film Interiors.

== Selected filmography ==
- Interiors (1978)
