= On Golden Pond (1981 film) =

1981 film by Mark Rydell

- Movie poster by Bill Gold
- Directed by: Mark Rydell
- Screenplay by: Ernest Thompson
- Based on: On Golden Pond by Ernest Thompson
- Produced by: Bruce Gilbert
- Starring: Katharine Hepburn; Henry Fonda; Jane Fonda; Doug McKeon; Dabney Coleman; William Lanteau
- Cinematography: Billy Williams
- Edited by: Robert L. Wolfe
- Music by: Dave Grusin
- Production companies: IPC Films; ITC Films
- Distributed by: Universal Pictures; Associated Film Distribution Corporation
- Release date: December 4, 1981
- Running time: 109 minutes
- Countries: United Kingdom; United States
- Language: English
- Budget: $7.5 million
- Box office: $119.3 million

On Golden Pond is a 1981 drama film directed by Mark Rydell from a screenplay written by Ernest Thompson, adapted from his 1979 play. It stars Katharine Hepburn, Henry Fonda, Jane Fonda, Doug McKeon, Dabney Coleman and William Lanteau. In his final film role, Henry Fonda portrays Norman, a crusty, retired professor grappling with many effects of aging. He has been married for many years to upbeat, feisty Ethel (Katharine Hepburn) but has a remote, difficult relationship with their daughter, Chelsea (Jane Fonda). At their summer home on Golden Pond, Norman and Ethel agree to care for Billy, the son of Chelsea's new boyfriend, and an unexpected relationship blooms.

On Golden Pond was released theatrically on December 4, 1981, to critical and commercial success. Reviewers highly praised Rydell's direction, Thompson's screenplay and the performances of the cast. The film grossed $119.3 million domestically, becoming the second highest-grossing film of 1981 in North America. It received ten nominations at the 54th Academy Awards, including for Best Picture, and won three: Best Actor (Henry Fonda), Best Actress (Katharine Hepburn) and Best Adapted Screenplay.

== Plot ==
An aging couple, Ethel and Norman Thayer, continue a tradition of spending each summer at their cottage on a lake called Golden Pond, in the far reaches of northern New England. When they first arrive, Ethel notices the loons calling on the lake "welcoming them home"; Norman, however, claims he does not hear anything.

As they resettle into their summer home, Norman, who is about to turn 80, shows signs of dementia when he is unable to recognize several family photographs. He copes with his memory problems by frequently talking about death and growing old. Ethel does her best to liven up the atmosphere – they play Parcheesi, admire the natural scenery, and talk to the mailman, Charlie, who visits via boat.

They are visited by their only child, daughter Chelsea, who is somewhat estranged from her father. She introduces her parents to her fiancé Bill and his 13-year-old son, Billy. Norman tries to play mind games with Bill, an apparent pastime of his. Bill tells him he knows what Norman is doing and he does not really mind, but that he will take only so much of it.

In another conversation, Chelsea discusses with Ethel her frustration over her relationship with her father, feeling that although she lives thousands of miles away in Los Angeles, she still feels like she is answering to him.

Before they depart for a European vacation, Chelsea and Bill ask the Thayers to allow Billy to stay with them for a month while they have some time to themselves. Although Norman is acting cynically as his 80th birthday approaches, showing signs of dementia and having heart palpitations, he allows Billy to stay.

Billy is at first annoyed by being left with elderly strangers, with no friends nearby and nothing to do. He resents Norman's brusque manner, but eventually comes to enjoy their Golden Pond fishing adventures together. Billy also begins to enjoy reading books in the cottage, first reading Treasure Island and later A Tale of Two Cities.

Billy and Norman soon grow obsessed with catching Norman's fish rival, "Walter", which leads to the accidental destruction of the Thayers' motorboat in a rocky area called Purgatory Cove. Norman gets thrown overboard and suffers a head wound, and Billy dives in the water to save the old man. They are later rescued by Ethel and Charlie.

Once healed, Norman goes fishing with Billy and they finally catch "Walter", but they eventually release the fish. Chelsea returns to learn her father has made friends with her fiancé's—now husband's—son. When she sees the change in her father's demeanor, Chelsea attempts something Billy accomplished that she never could: a backflip. She successfully executes the dive in front of a cheering Norman, Billy and Ethel. Chelsea and Norman finally fully embrace before she and Bill depart with Billy.

The final day on Golden Pond comes and the Thayers are loading the last of the boxes. Norman tries to move a heavy box but starts having heart pain and collapses onto the floor of the porch. Ethel tries unsuccessfully to get the operator to phone the hospital, and goes to comfort her husband.

Norman then comes to, says the pain is gone, and attempts to stand to say a final farewell to the lake. Ethel helps Norman to the edge, where they see the loons, and Norman says they are calling on the lake, "saying goodbye". He notes how they are just like him and Ethel; that their offspring is grown and gone off on her own, and now it is just the two of them.

== Cast ==
- Katharine Hepburn as Ethel Thayer
- Henry Fonda as Norman Thayer Jr.
- Jane Fonda as Chelsea Thayer Wayne
- Doug McKeon as Billy Ray Jr.
- Dabney Coleman as Dr. Bill Ray
- William Lanteau as Charlie Martin
- Christopher Rydell as Sumner Todd (as Chris Rydell)

== Production ==
Jane Fonda purchased the rights to the play specifically for her father, Henry Fonda, to play the cantankerous Norman Thayer. The father-daughter rift depicted on-screen closely paralleled the real-life relationship between the two Fondas. The producers originally offered the role of Norman Thayer to James Stewart, but he declined. Anthony Michael Hall auditioned for the role of Billy Ray Jr., which eventually went to Doug McKeon.

Screenwriter Thompson spent his summers along the shores of Great Pond, located in Belgrade, Maine, but the film was made on Squam Lake in Holderness, New Hampshire. The house used in the film was leased from a New York physician and was modified significantly for the shoot: an entire second floor was added as a balcony over the main living area at the request of the production designer. After the shoot, the production company was contractually obligated to return the house to its original state, but the owner liked the renovations so much that he elected to keep the house that way and asked the crew not to dismantle the second story. A gazebo and a small boathouse were also relocated during the shoot.

The Thayer IV was the name of the boat used in the film. There were three Thayer IV's used in the movie, including one replica used for the crash scene. One was a 1950 Chris-Craft Sportsman (U22-1460), bought by a family in 1982 from marine coordinator Pat Curtin. The other boat, also a Chris-Craft Sportsman (U22-1802), was sold in 1983 by Curtin. It was the boat Fonda and Hepburn used for their excursions on Golden Pond. At the same time, the buyer of U22-1802 also purchased the replica used in the crash scene. Although the Chris-Craft Sportsman was the main boat used in the movie, the script called for the Thayer IV, a mail boat, a canoe and a replica of the Thayer IV. These were provided by Patrick Curtin of Eastern Classics, a boatyard in Laconia, New Hampshire, specializing in the restoration of mahogany speedboats. Following World War II, the Sportsman model reappeared as a direct descendant of its 1937 predecessors. The popular model stayed in the Chris-Craft lineup until 1960. The use of a 1950 Sportsman model as the Thayer IV in On Golden Pond did much to generate interest in antique and classic boats.

Despite their many common acquaintances and long careers in show business, Henry Fonda and Katharine Hepburn not only had never worked together, but had never met until working on the film. On the first day of shooting, Hepburn presented Fonda with her longtime companion Spencer Tracy's "lucky" hat, which Fonda wore in the film. Hepburn, who was 74 at the time of filming, performed all her own stunts, including a dive into the pond.

The scene in which Norman and step-grandson Billy run their boat into the rocks was filmed repeatedly. The vintage 1951 mahogany Chris-Craft boat, used strictly for the crash scene, was so sturdy that it kept bouncing off the rocks without any damage. The crew had to modify the boat so it would break away in the wreck. The water level in Squam Lake was so low during the summer of production that Fonda and Doug McKeon could have stood during the scene in which they were supposedly clinging to the rocks for fear of drowning. The September water was barely knee-deep, but it was cold enough that the pair had to wear wetsuits under their clothes. Hepburn, on the other hand, dove into the water without the aid of the wetsuit because she wanted the scene to keep its authenticity. Some of the scenes in which Billy takes the boat on his own were filmed on nearby Lake Winnipesaukee.

While filming the scene in which Fonda and Hepburn are watching the loons on the lake, the speedboat that sped by and disturbed them was so forceful it overturned their canoe in one take. Fonda was immediately taken out of the water and wrapped up in blankets, as his health was fragile by then.

The town of Holderness, New Hampshire, offers boat tours of Squam Lake and the filming locations in the movie. There is also a restaurant called "Walter's Basin", which is named after the trout called "Walter" that Billy catches with Norman. For filming, "Walter" was brought from a trout pond at the nearby Castle in the Clouds estate. He was released into Squam Lake after his capture.

Leftover footage of Fonda and Hepburn driving through the New Hampshire countryside, as seen in the opening credits, was later used for the opening of the CBS television sitcom Newhart.

The studio behind the film was ITC Entertainment, the British company presided over (until late 1981) by Lord Grade, the television and film mogul. It was Grade who largely raised the financing for the film.

== Reception ==
=== Box office ===
With a box office take of $119,285,432, On Golden Pond was the second-highest-grossing film of the year, following Raiders of the Lost Ark.

=== Critical reception ===
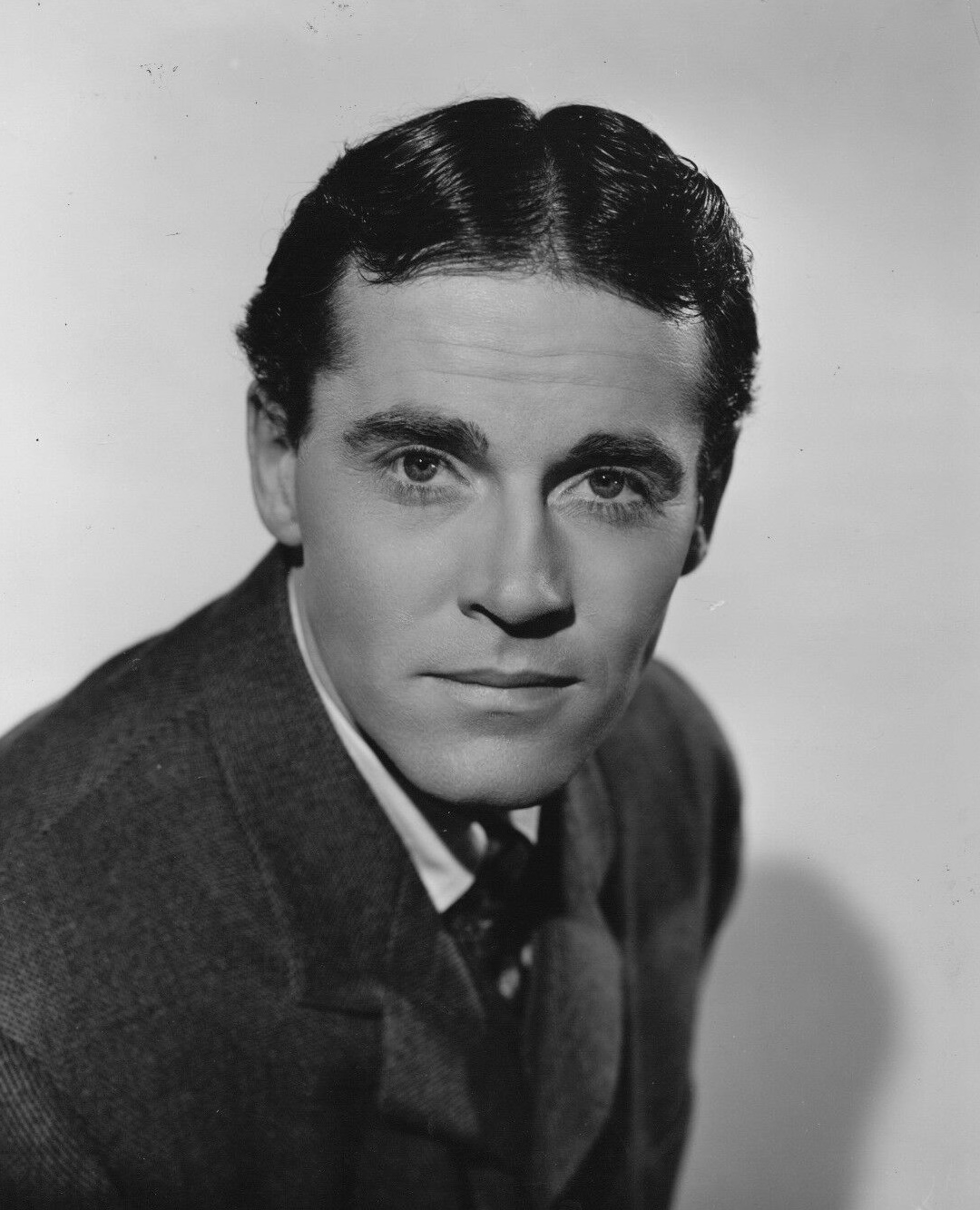
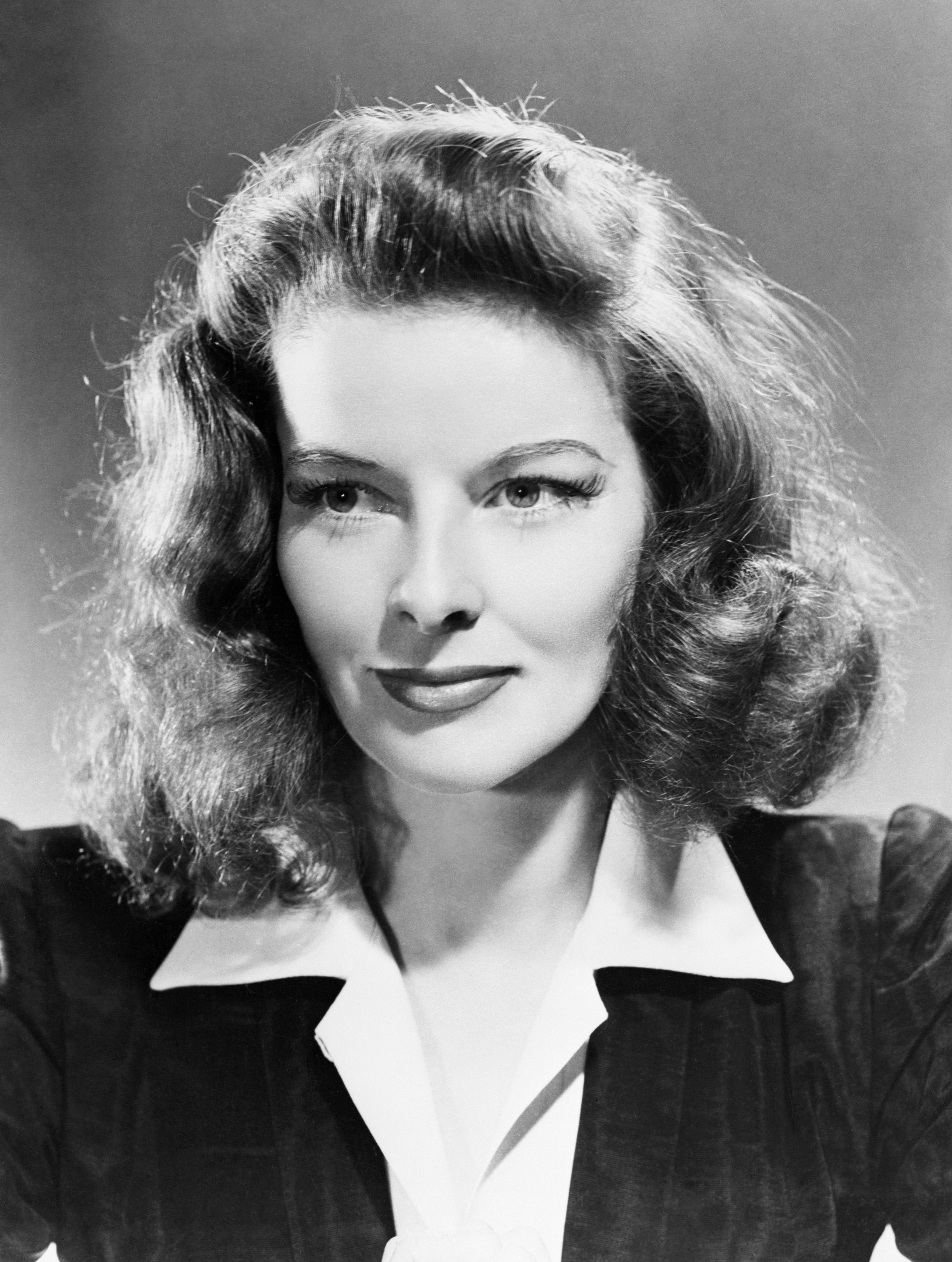
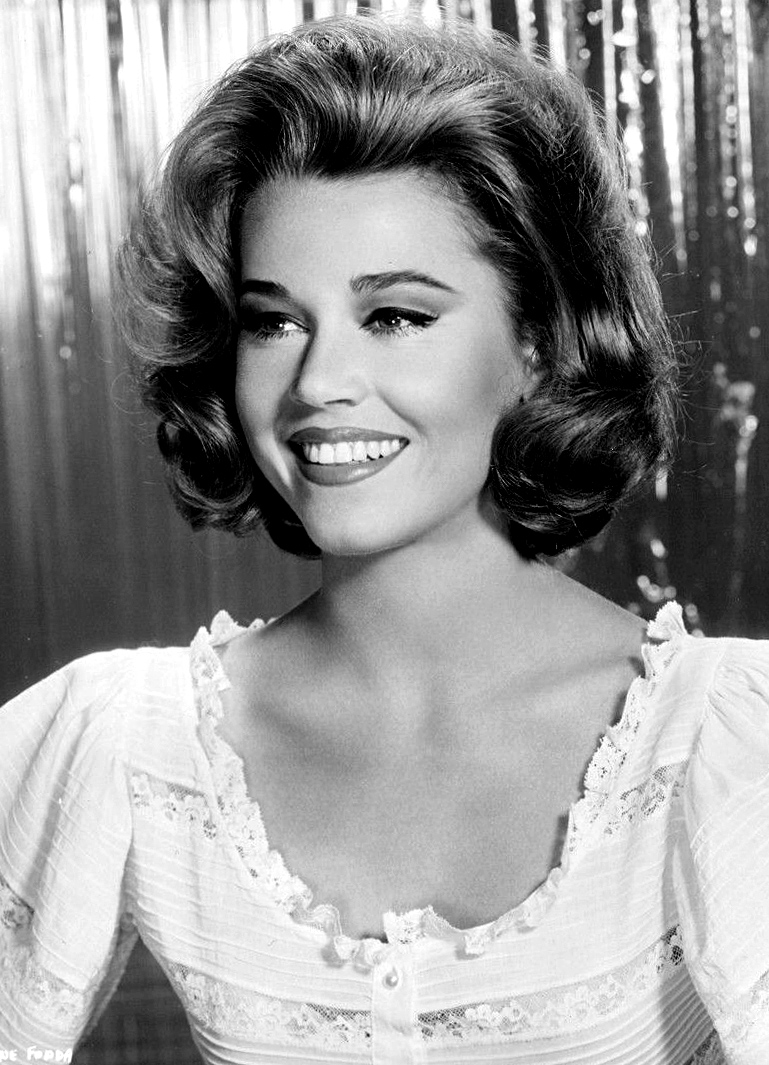
Henry Fonda, Katharine Hepburn and Jane Fonda earned Academy Award nominations for Best Actor, Best Actress and Best Supporting Actress respectively, with Henry and Hepburn winning; her fourth one, a record for most wins by any actor.

On Golden Pond received critical acclaim, with critics highlighting the screenplay and performances of the cast (particularly of Hepburn and Henry Fonda). The review aggregator Rotten Tomatoes gives the film an approval rating of 91% based on 44 reviews, with an average rating of 7.7/10. The website's critical consensus reads, "Henry Fonda and Katharine Hepburn are a wondrous duo in On Golden Pond, a wistful drama that movingly explores the twilight years of a loving marriage."

Roger Ebert of the Chicago Sun-Times said:

On Golden Pond was a treasure for many reasons, but the best one, I think, is that I could believe it. I could believe in its major characters and their relationships, and in the things they felt for one another, and there were moments when the movie was witness to human growth and change. I left the theater feeling good and warm, and with a certain resolve to try to mend my own relationships and learn to start listening better ... watching the movie, I felt I was witnessing something rare and valuable.

In his The New York Times review, Vincent Canby said:

As a successful Broadway play, On Golden Pond was processed American cheese, smooth, infinitely spreadable and bland, with color added by the actors ... the movie ... still American cheese, but its stars—Henry Fonda, Katharine Hepburn, Jane Fonda and Dabney Coleman—add more than color to this pasteurized product. On Golden Pond now has the bite of a good old cheddar ... Mr. Fonda gives one of the great performances of his long, truly distinguished career. Here is film acting of the highest order ... Miss Hepburn ... is also in fine form. One of the most appealing things about her as an actress is the way she responds to—and is invigorated by—a strong co-star ... she needs someone to support, challenge and interact with. Mr. Fonda is the best thing that's happened to her since Spencer Tracy and Humphrey Bogart ... an added pleasure is the opportunity to see Dabney Coleman [in] a role that goes beyond the caricatures he's usually given to play ... On Golden Pond is a mixed blessing, but it offers one performance of rare quality and three others that are very good. That's not half-bad.

TV Guide rates it 3 1/2 out of 4 stars, calling it "a beautifully photographed movie filled with poignancy, humor, and (of course) superb acting ... there could have been no finer final curtain for [Henry Fonda] than this."

Channel 4 sums up its review by stating:

Henry Fonda and Katharine Hepburn both shine in an impressively executed Hollywood drama. [It] has its mawkish moments but there's a certain pleasure in that, and writer Thompson's analysis of old age is sensitive, thought-provoking and credible.

Not all reviewers were impressed. David Kehr of the Chicago Reader wrote:

The cinematic equivalent of shrink-wrapping, in which all of the ideas, feelings, characters, and images are neatly separated and hermetically sealed to prevent spoilage, abrasion, or any contact with the natural world ... Mark Rydell's bright, banal visual style further sterilizes the issues. The film exudes complacency and self-congratulation; it is a very cowardly, craven piece of ersatz art.

Time Out London said, "Two of Hollywood's best-loved veterans deserved a far better swan song than this sticky confection."

== Accolades ==
Award	Category	Nominee(s)	Result
Academy Awards	Best Picture	Bruce Gilbert	Nominated
Academy Awards	Best Director	Mark Rydell	Nominated
Academy Awards	Best Actor	Henry Fonda	Won
Academy Awards	Best Actress	Katharine Hepburn	Won
Academy Awards	Best Supporting Actress	Jane Fonda	Nominated
Academy Awards	Best Adapted Screenplay	Ernest Thompson	Won
Academy Awards	Best Cinematography	Billy Williams	Nominated
Academy Awards	Best Film Editing	Robert L. Wolfe	Nominated
Academy Awards	Best Original Score	Dave Grusin	Nominated
Academy Awards	Best Sound	Richard Portman and David M. Ronne	Nominated
American Cinema Editors Awards	Best Edited Feature Film	Robert L. Wolfe	Nominated
American Movie Awards	Best Actor	Henry Fonda	Won
American Movie Awards	Best Actress	Katharine Hepburn	Won
American Movie Awards	Best Supporting Actress	Jane Fonda	Won
British Academy Film Awards	Best Film	Bruce Gilbert	Nominated
British Academy Film Awards	Best Direction	Mark Rydell	Nominated
British Academy Film Awards	Best Actor in a Leading Role	Henry Fonda	Nominated
British Academy Film Awards	Best Actress in a Leading Role	Katharine Hepburn	Won
British Academy Film Awards	Best Actress in a Supporting Role	Jane Fonda	Nominated
British Academy Film Awards	Best Screenplay	Ernest Thompson	Nominated
British Society of Cinematographers	Best Cinematography in a Theatrical Feature Film	Billy Williams	Nominated
Directors Guild of America Awards	Outstanding Directing – Feature Film	Mark Rydell	Nominated
Golden Globe Awards	Best Motion Picture - Drama		Won
Golden Globe Awards	Best Director	Mark Rydell	Nominated
Golden Globe Awards	Best Actor in a Motion Picture - Drama	Henry Fonda	Won
Golden Globe Awards	Best Actress in a Motion Picture - Drama	Katharine Hepburn	Nominated
Golden Globe Awards	Best Supporting Actress – Motion Picture	Jane Fonda	Nominated
Golden Globe Awards	Best Screenplay	Ernest Thompson	Won
Grammy Awards	Best Album of Original Score Written for a Motion Picture or Television Special	Dave Grusin	Nominated
Japan Academy Film Prize	Outstanding Foreign Language Film		Nominated
Karlovy Vary International Film Festival	Best Actor	Henry Fonda	Won (Note: Tied with Donald Sutherland for Threshold.)
Los Angeles Film Critics Association Awards	Best Actor	Henry Fonda	Runner-up
National Board of Review Awards	Top Ten Films		5th Place
National Board of Review Awards	Best Actor	Henry Fonda	Won
National Society of Film Critics Awards	Best Actor	Henry Fonda	3rd Place
New York Film Critics Circle Awards	Best Actor	Henry Fonda	Runner-up
Writers Guild of America Awards	Best Drama Adapted from Another Medium	Ernest Thompson	Won

American Film Institute recognition

- AFI's 100 Years... 100 Passions – No. 22
- AFI's 100 Years... 100 Movie Quotes:
  - "Listen to me, mister. You're my knight in shining armor. Don't you forget it. You're going to get back on that horse, and I'm going to be right behind you, holding on tight, and away we're gonna go, go, go!" – #88
- AFI's 100 Years of Film Scores – #24
- AFI's 100 Years... 100 Cheers – #45

== Explanatory notes ==
Awards
Preceded by Coming Home	Academy Award winner for Best Actor and Best Actress	Succeeded by The Silence of the Lambs
