= Gordon Willis =

American cinematographer and film director

- Born: Gordon Hugh Willis Jr. May 28, 1931; Astoria, New York, U.S.
- Died: May 18, 2014 (aged 82); North Falmouth, Massachusetts, U.S.
- Burial place: Massachusetts National Cemetery; Bourne, Massachusetts
- Occupation: Cinematographer
- Years active: 1966–1997
- Known for: The Godfather (1972); The Godfather Part II (1974); Annie Hall (1977); Manhattan (1979); All the President's Men (1976); Interiors (1978); Stardust Memories (1980); Zelig (1983); Broadway Danny Rose (1984); The Godfather Part III (1990)
- Awards: Academy Honorary Award (2009)

Gordon Hugh Willis Jr., ASC (May 28, 1931 – May 18, 2014) was an American cinematographer and film director, known for his influential work during the American New Wave of the 1970s, collaborating with directors like Woody Allen and Alan J. Pakula, as well as working with Francis Ford Coppola on the Godfather trilogy.

Fellow cinematographer William A. Fraker called Willis's work a "milestone in visual storytelling", while one critic suggested that Willis "defined the cinematic look of the 1970s: sophisticated compositions in which bolts of light and black put the decade's moral ambiguities into stark relief". When the International Cinematographers Guild conducted a survey in 2003, they placed Willis among the ten most influential cinematographers in history.

== Career ==
=== Early life and beginnings ===
Willis was born in Astoria, Queens, New York. His parents had been dancers in Broadway theatre before his father became a makeup man at Warner Bros. in Brooklyn. As a child, Willis fell in love with films. He wanted to be an actor and then became interested in lighting and stage design, later turning to photography. For a time he intended to be a fashion photographer, photographing models he knew from living in Greenwich Village. "I didn't know shit," Willis said, "[I was] dumber than dirt, as they say. No money, no jobs etc." Through contacts of his father's he worked as a "gofer" on various movies in New York.

During the Korean War, Willis served in the Air Force, managing to join the Photographic and Charting Service in a motion picture unit. "I spent four years learning everything I could about making movies," Willis said. After leaving the Air Force a friend helped him to join the East Coast union in New York and he started to work as an assistant cameraman, working his way up to become a first cameraman about thirteen years later. He worked in advertising, shooting numerous commercials, and made a number of documentaries, a discipline that strongly influenced his later style. "You learn to eliminate, as opposed to adding," Willis said of his time making documentaries. "Not many people understand that."

He was a camera operator on the feature documentary Windjammer (1958) filmed in the widescreen format Cinemiracle.

Willis once stated: "I'm a minimalist. I see things in simple ways ... It's human nature to define complexity as better. Well, it's not." In 1969, director Aram Avakian hired Willis to work on his film End of the Road. This was Willis' first movie.

=== Making films ===
Willis went on to work for some of the most acclaimed directors of what is now seen as a golden age of American film-making. He captured America's urban paranoia in three films he shot with Alan J. Pakula: Klute (1971), The Parallax View (1974) and All The President's Men (1976). He collaborated with Hal Ashby on The Landlord (1970), James Bridges on The Paper Chase (1973), and Herbert Ross on Pennies From Heaven (1981); as well as shooting all three of Coppola's Godfather films and working with Woody Allen on a succession of films that included Annie Hall (1977) and Manhattan (1979).

At a seminar on film-making he gave in 2003, Willis said, "It's hard to believe, but a lot of directors have no visual sense. They only have a storytelling sense. If a director is smart, he'll give me the elbow room to paint". He added: "It's the judgment they're paying for." In a later interview he explained that when he started out in films he "did things in visual structure that nobody in the business was doing, especially in Hollywood", explaining: "I wasn't trying to be different; I just did what I liked". When asked by the interviewer how he applied his style to different genres and to working with different directors, Willis answered: "You're looking for a formula; there is none. The formula is me."

Up to the making of The Godfather (1972), Willis mostly used Mitchell reflex cameras with Baltar or Cooke lenses. After that he used Panavision equipment, which he had first used on Klute. Willis went back to using Mitchells on The Godfather Part II (1974), in order to retain the visual coherence of the two films. Asked in 2004 about shooting films digitally, he was skeptical: "The organics aren't the same," he said. "The interpretive levels suffer", adding: "Digital is another form of recording an image, but it won't replace thinking."

=== Collaboration with Francis Ford Coppola ===
Originally, Willis turned down the first two Godfather films, until Coppola told him they would not look the same without him. His work turned out to be groundbreaking in its use of low-light photography and underexposed film, as well as in his control of lighting and exposure to create the sepia tones that denoted period scenes in The Godfather Part II. His contributions carefully strengthened the themes of the story, as when shooting Marlon Brando with his eyes hooded in shadow, a piece of lighting design that followed from the fact that Brando's make-up had to be lit from above.

Willis said that it was the color that stitched the Godfather films together. The visual structure of the films was, he said, his, but he gave Coppola credit for hiring him, saying: "I'm not that easy to deal with". He praised the director for the "management hell" of his struggles with Paramount, adding that he was "grateful he could separate the visual structure of these movies from the mess that went on to fashion them".

=== Collaboration with Woody Allen ===
Willis' collaboration with Woody Allen began with Annie Hall (1977). Willis described making films with Allen as being so comfortable that it was like "working with your hands in your pockets". On Annie Hall he contrasted the warmth of Annie and Alvy Singer's romance in New York with the overexposure of the film's California scenes, while in Allen's Manhattan he was responsible for what has been called a "richly textured black-and-white paean to the beauty and diversity of the city itself". Willis, whose idea it was to use anamorphic widescreen for the filming, said: "We both felt that New York was a black-and-white city".

Willis also worked on the Allen films Interiors (1978), Stardust Memories (1980), A Midsummer Night's Sex Comedy (1982), Zelig (1983), Broadway Danny Rose (1984), and The Purple Rose of Cairo (1985). Allen said that working with Willis had helped to improve his technical skills, saying of him: "He's an artist. He's got a great sense of humor--he taught me a lot."

=== Academy Awards ===
In the seven-year period up to 1977, Willis was the director of photography on six films that received among them 39 Academy Award nominations, winning 19 times, including three awards for Best Picture. The fact that Willis did not receive a single nomination was a subject of some controversy. His frequent absence from this period's nominees has been ascribed both to his unhidden "antipathy for Hollywood" and his work being ahead of its time. He was once quoted as saying of Hollywood, "I don't think it suffers from an overabundance of good taste". Willis was later nominated twice, once for his recreation of 1920s photography in Woody Allen's Zelig (1983), and then for The Godfather Part III (1990). In 2009, at the inaugural Governors Awards, the Academy chose Willis as the recipient of the Academy Honorary Award for his life's work.

=== Directing and retirement ===
Willis directed one film of his own, Windows, in 1980. He admitted the film had been a mistake, and later said that he did not really like directing. "I've had a good relationship with actors," he reflected, "but I can do what I do and back off. I don't want that much romancing. I don't want them to call me up at two in the morning saying, 'I don't know who I am'". He was nominated for the Golden Raspberry Award for Worst Director one year after the film's release.

His last film was The Devil's Own (1997), directed by Pakula. Of his decision to retire, Willis said: "I got tired of trying to get actors out of trailers, and standing in the rain".

== Death ==
Willis died of cancer on May 18, 2014, ten days before his 83rd birthday, in North Falmouth, Massachusetts. ASC president Richard Crudo said: "He was one of the giants who absolutely changed the way movies looked. Up until the time of The Godfather and The Godfather Part II, nothing previously shot looked that way. He changed the way films looked and the way people looked at films."

== Legacy ==
Willis's work became celebrated for his ability to use shadow and underexposed film with a "subtlety and expressivity previously unknown on color film stock", with one critic citing as examples Don Corleone's study in The Godfather and a parking garage in All the President's Men. Willis's friend, cinematographer Conrad Hall, named him "The Prince of Darkness" but Willis himself preferred to talk in terms of "visual relativity", saying: "I like going from light to dark, dark to light, big to small, small to big". Discussing The Godfather he said:

"You can decide this movie has got a dark palette. But you can't spend two hours on a dark palette. . . So you've got this high-key, Kodachrome wedding going on. Now you go back inside and it's dark again. You can't, in my mind, put both feet into a bucket of cement and leave them there for the whole movie. It doesn't work. You must have this relativity."

Director Francis Ford Coppola said of Willis, "He has a natural sense of structure and beauty, not unlike a Renaissance artist," while Willis was praised for his capacity to use "painterliness" to define "not just the look but the very meaning and feel of a film". Speaking of contemporary film-making in 2004, Willis said:

"I'm delighted that people can fly, dogs can talk, and anything destructive can be fashioned on the screen, but much of what's being done lacks structure or taste. As I've asked in the past: can anyone give me the definition of a camera? It's a tool, a means to an end. So is a light, and everything else you can pile on your back. They're all meant to transpose the written word into moving pictures that tell a story."

== Filmography ==
Film

Year	Title	Director
1970	End of the Road	Aram Avakian
1970	Loving	Irvin Kershner
1970	The Landlord	Hal Ashby
1970	The People Next Door	David Greene
1971	Little Murders	Alan Arkin
1971	Klute	Alan J. Pakula
1972	The Godfather	Francis Ford Coppola
1972	Bad Company	Robert Benton
1972	Up the Sandbox	Irvin Kershner
1973	The Paper Chase	James Bridges
1974	The Parallax View	Alan J. Pakula
1974	The Godfather Part II	Francis Ford Coppola
1975	The Drowning Pool	Stuart Rosenberg
1976	All the President's Men	Alan J. Pakula
1977	Annie Hall	Woody Allen
1977	September 30, 1955	James Bridges
1978	Interiors	Woody Allen
1978	Comes a Horseman	Alan J. Pakula
1979	Manhattan	Woody Allen
1980	Windows	Himself
1980	Stardust Memories	Woody Allen
1981	Pennies from Heaven	Herbert Ross
1982	A Midsummer Night's Sex Comedy	Woody Allen
1983	Zelig	Woody Allen
1984	Broadway Danny Rose	Woody Allen
1985	The Purple Rose of Cairo	Woody Allen
1985	Perfect	James Bridges
1986	The Money Pit	Richard Benjamin
1987	The Pick-up Artist	James Toback
1988	Bright Lights, Big City	James Bridges
1990	Presumed Innocent	Alan J. Pakula
1990	The Godfather Part III	Francis Ford Coppola
1993	Malice	Harold Becker
1997	The Devil's Own	Alan J. Pakula

TV movie

Year	Title	Director
1984	The Lost Honor of Kathryn Beck	Simon Langton

== Awards and nominations ==
Year	Award	Category	Title	Result	Ref.
1983	Academy Awards	Best Cinematography	Zelig	Nominated	
1990	Academy Awards	Best Cinematography	The Godfather Part III	Nominated	
2009	Academy Awards	Honorary Academy Award		Won	
1983	American Society of Cinematographers	Outstanding Cinematography	Zelig	Nominated	
1990	American Society of Cinematographers	Outstanding Cinematography	The Godfather Part III	Nominated	
1995	American Society of Cinematographers	Life Achievement Awards		Won	
1976	British Academy Film Awards	Best Cinematography	All the Presidents Men	Nominated	
1979	British Academy Film Awards	Best Cinematography	Manhattan	Nominated	
1983	British Academy Film Awards	Best Cinematography	Zelig	Nominated	
1983	Best Visual Effects	Best Cinematography	Zelig	Nominated	
1972	National Society of Film Critics	Best Cinematography	The Godfather	Nominated	
1974	National Society of Film Critics	Best Cinematography	The Godfather Part II	Won	
1974	National Society of Film Critics	Best Cinematography	The Parallax View	Won	
1979	National Society of Film Critics	Best Cinematography	Manhattan	Nominated	
1981	National Society of Film Critics	Best Cinematography	Pennies from Heaven	Won	
1983	National Society of Film Critics	Best Cinematography	Zelig	Nominated	
1981	New York Film Critics Circle	Best Cinematography	Pennies from Heaven	Nominated	
1983	New York Film Critics Circle	Best Cinematography	Zelig	Won	
1981	Boston Society of Film Critics	Best Cinematography	Pennies from Heaven	Won	
1991	Chicago Film Critics Association	Best Cinematography	The Godfather Part III	Nominated	
