= Trevor Griffiths =

English dramatist (1935–2024)

- Born: 4 April 1935; Manchester, England
- Died: 29 March 2024 (aged 88); Boston Spa, England
- Education: Manchester University
- Occupation: Dramatist
- Spouses: Janice Stansfield (m. 1960; died 1977); Gill Cliff
- Children: 3
- Writing career
- Period: 1964–2011

Trevor Griffiths (4 April 1935 – 29 March 2024) was an English dramatist.

== Early life ==
Trevor Griffiths was born in Ancoats, Manchester, and brought up as a Roman Catholic by his mother, Annie, who was a bus conductor, and his father, Ernest, who worked in a factory. He attended St. Bede's College before being accepted into Manchester University in 1952 to read English. He graduated in 1955. After a brief involvement with professional football and a year in national service, he became a teacher and then an education officer for the BBC.

== Career ==
=== 1960s–1970s ===
Griffiths became chairman of the Manchester Left Club, and the editor of the Labour Party's Northern Voice newspaper. Gradually he tired of political journalism, began writing plays, and was eventually commissioned by Tony Garnett to provide a script for The Wednesday Play (BBC, 1964–70). The play, "The Love Maniac", was about a teacher, but even though Garnett took the commission with him when he moved to London Weekend Television and formed Kestrel Productions, it was never produced.

Buoyed by Garnett's enthusiasm and influenced by the Paris events of May 1968, he wrote Occupations, a stage play about the Italian Communist Antonio Gramsci and the Fiat factory occupations of 1920s Italy. The play had been submitted to the Royal Shakespeare Company (RSC) as early as 1964, but had then been rejected as being "too controversial". Following its premiere in Manchester the previous year, the eventual RSC production in 1971 of Occupations, Griffiths' first full-length stage play, was directed by Buzz Goodbody. Intending to affect "bourgeois theatre" with his viewpoint, Griffiths described his approach as being "committed to analysing Marxism and to condemn Stalinism without discrediting socialism in the eyes of the world".

The play soon brought him to the attention of Kenneth Tynan, the literary manager of the National Theatre Company, who promptly commissioned Griffiths to write the play that became The Party. This critique of the British revolutionary left featured the National's artistic director Laurence Olivier in his last stage role as the Glaswegian Trotskyist John Tagg. Griffiths had by now begun to write television plays, such as "All Good Men" (Play for Today, BBC, 31 January 1974) and "Through the Night" (2 December 1975). Influenced by the experience of his wife, the latter is concerned with a woman's treatment for breast cancer. Between these two plays came "Absolute Beginners" (BBC, 19 April 1974), an episode of the series Fall of Eagles, which presents a version of events in 1903 involving Lenin and Trotsky. He developed a series about parliamentary democracy, Bill Brand, which was first shown by ITV in the summer of 1976.

Despite his considerable success in the theatre, he said in 1976 of his work as a television dramatist: "I simply cannot understand socialist playwrights who do not devote most of their time to television... [for] if for every Sweeney that went out, a Bill Brand went out, there would be a real struggle for the popular imagination... and people would be free to make liberating choices about where reality lies."

In the meantime, Griffiths had continued to write for the theatre with Comedians, commissioned by Nottingham Playhouse. The premiere production of the play was directed by Richard Eyre, at that time the artistic director of the Nottingham theatre, and was first performed on 20 February 1975. Comedians is set in a Manchester night school, where a group of budding comics gather for a final briefing before performing to an agent from London. The play is set in real time, i.e. as the real time is 7.27, the clock on the wall of the schoolroom also says 7.27. It subsequently transferred to Broadway, and was later adapted for television by Eyre while he was responsible for Play for Today.

=== 1980s ===
Griffiths' reputation at the time was such that Warren Beatty asked him to write a screenplay for a project about the US revolutionary John Reed, which eventually became the Oscar-winning film Reds (1981), but Griffiths departed from the project before the script was completed and estimated that he had written only 45% of the script for the finished film.

Griffiths continued to work in the theatre, gaining success with the touring production of Oi for England (ITV, 17 April 1982). His television play, Country (BBC, 20 October 1981), set just before the Labour victory at the 1945 general election is "a not wholly unsympathetic study of a Tory family". He wrote the television serial The Last Place on Earth (ITV, 1985), and the screenplay for Fatherland (1986) for director Ken Loach. He created a screen adaptation in 1981 for D. H. Lawrence's novel Sons and Lovers and in 1990, Piano, a stage version of a 1977 film itself based on Anton Chekhov's play Platonov.

=== 1990s–2000s ===
Griffiths's Food for Ravens (BBC, 15 November 1997), was commissioned to mark the 100th anniversary of Aneurin Bevan's birth, but at one point the BBC decided not to network the play, and instead restrict it to Wales. Only a newspaper campaign led by Griffiths and the leading actor Brian Cox caused the BBC to relent, and it was finally shown in a late-night slot on BBC2.

In November 2008, Griffiths participated in a discussion on "The Writer and Revolution" with the World Socialist Web Site's arts editor David Walsh at the University of Manchester. In 2009 he completed his last play, A New World: A Life of Thomas Paine.

Griffiths participated in the Bush Theatre's 2011 project Sixty-Six Books, for which he wrote a piece based on the Book of Habakkuk from the King James Bible.

== Personal life and death ==
In 1960, Griffiths married Janice Stansfield; the couple had three children and were married until her death in an aviation accident in Cuba in 1977. He married Gill Cliff in 1992. He lived in Boston Spa.

Griffiths died from congestive heart failure at his home on 29 March 2024, six days before his 89th birthday.
