= 33rd British Academy Film Awards =

1980 film awards ceremony

- Date: 20 March 1980
- Site: Grosvenor House Hotel
- Hosted by: Anna Ford; Edward Fox

Highlights
- Best Film: Manhattan
- Best Actor: Jack Lemmon; The China Syndrome
- Best Actress: Jane Fonda; The China Syndrome
- Most awards: Alien, Apocalypse Now, The China Syndrome, The Deer Hunter, Manhattan and Yanks (2)
- Most nominations: Manhattan (10)

The 33rd British Academy Film Awards, more commonly known as the BAFTAs, took place on 20 March 1980 at the Grosvenor House Hotel in London, honouring the best national and foreign films of 1979. Presented by the British Academy of Film and Television Arts, accolades were handed out for the best feature-length film and documentaries of any nationality that were screened at British cinemas in 1979.

Woody Allen's Manhattan won the award for Best Film. Jack Lemmon and Jane Fonda took home Best Actor and Actress, whilst Robert Duvall and Rachel Roberts won in the supporting categories.

Six films tied for most wins at the ceremony; Alien, Apocalypse Now, The China Syndrome, The Deer Hunter, Manhattan and Yanks. Each film received two awards.

The ceremony was hosted by Anna Ford and Edward Fox.

== Winners and nominees ==
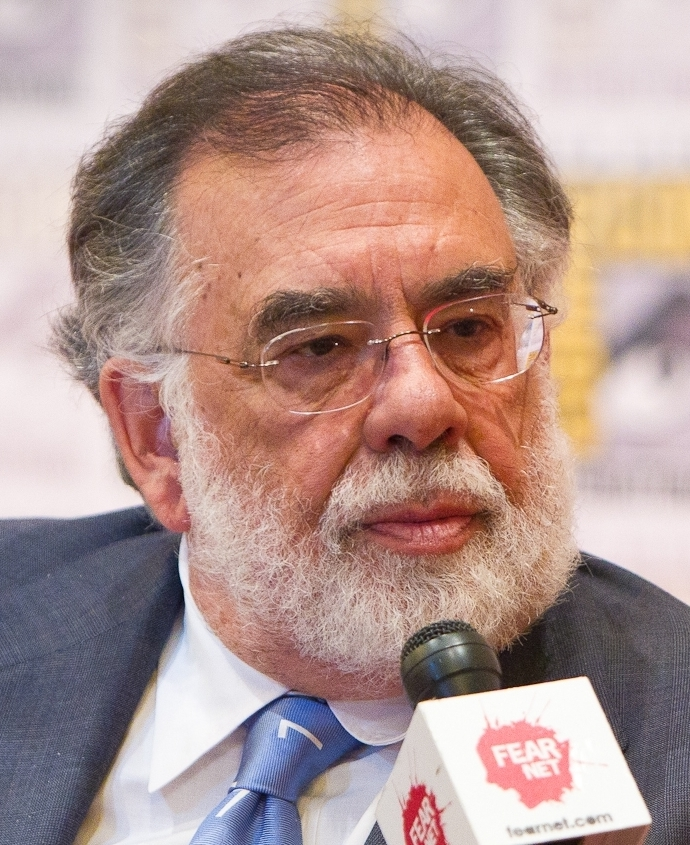
Francis Ford Coppola, Best Director winner

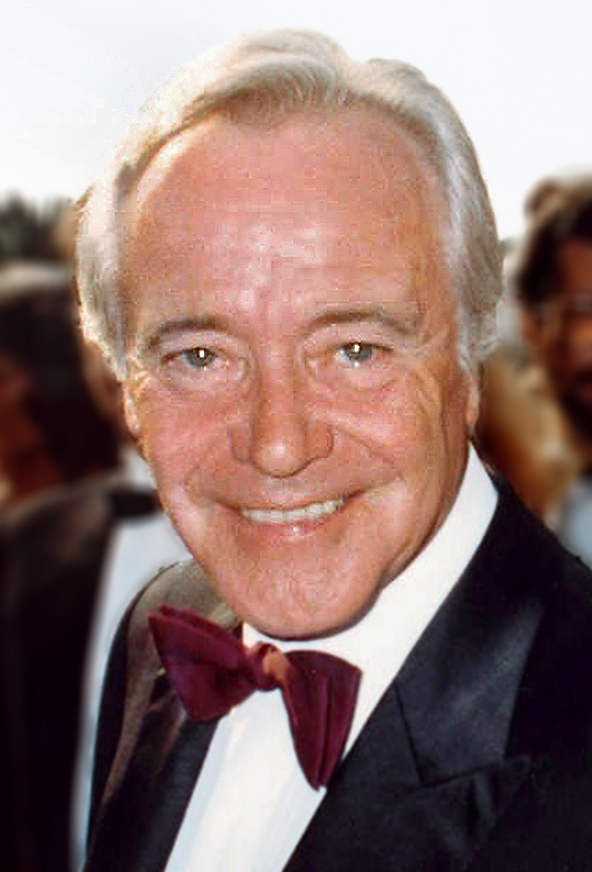
Jack Lemmon, Best Actor winner

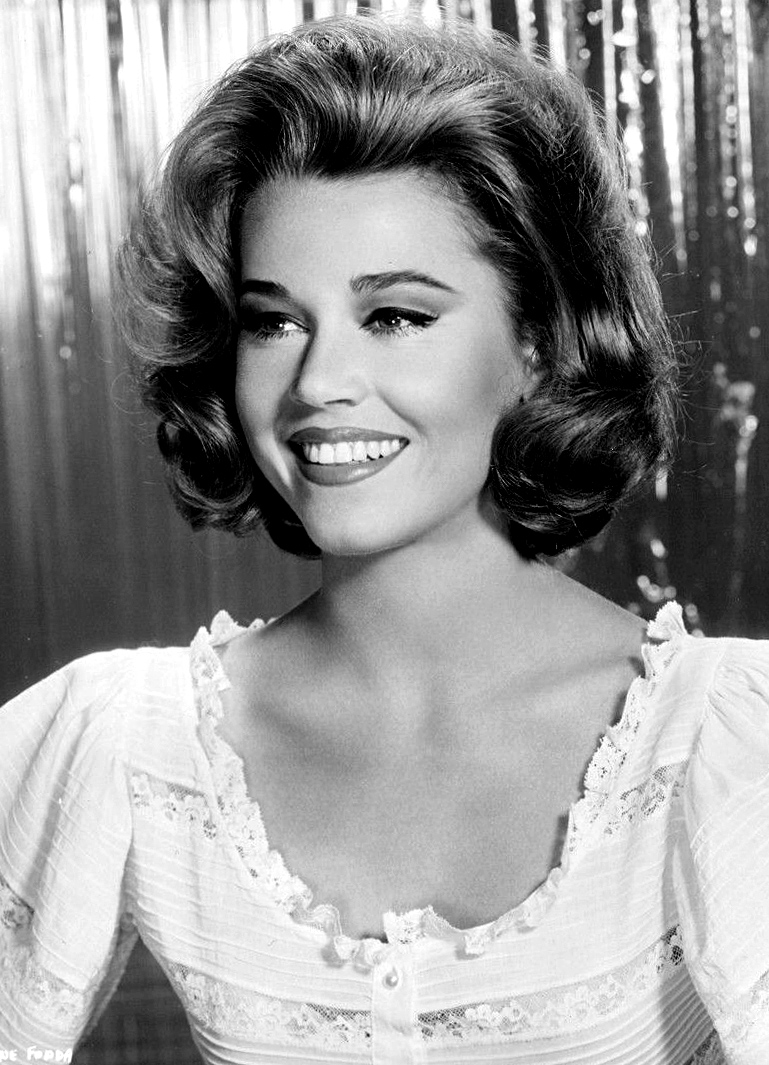
Jane Fonda, Best Actress winner

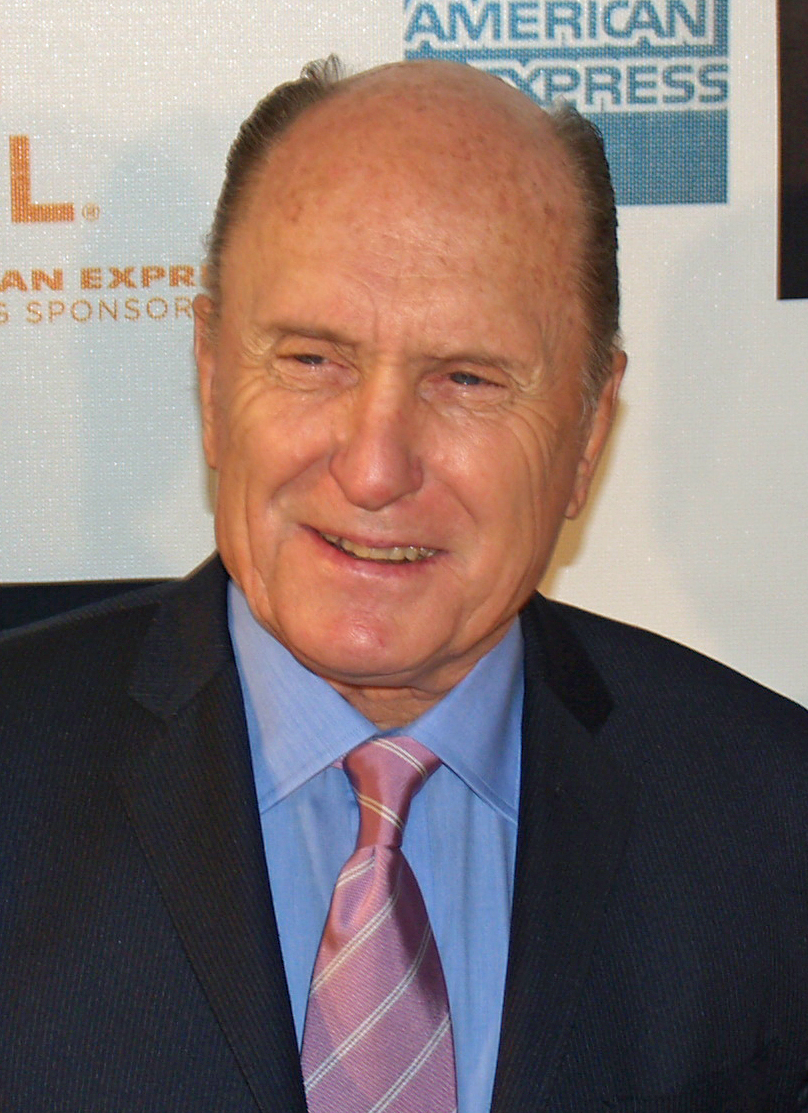
Robert Duvall, Best Supporting Actor winner

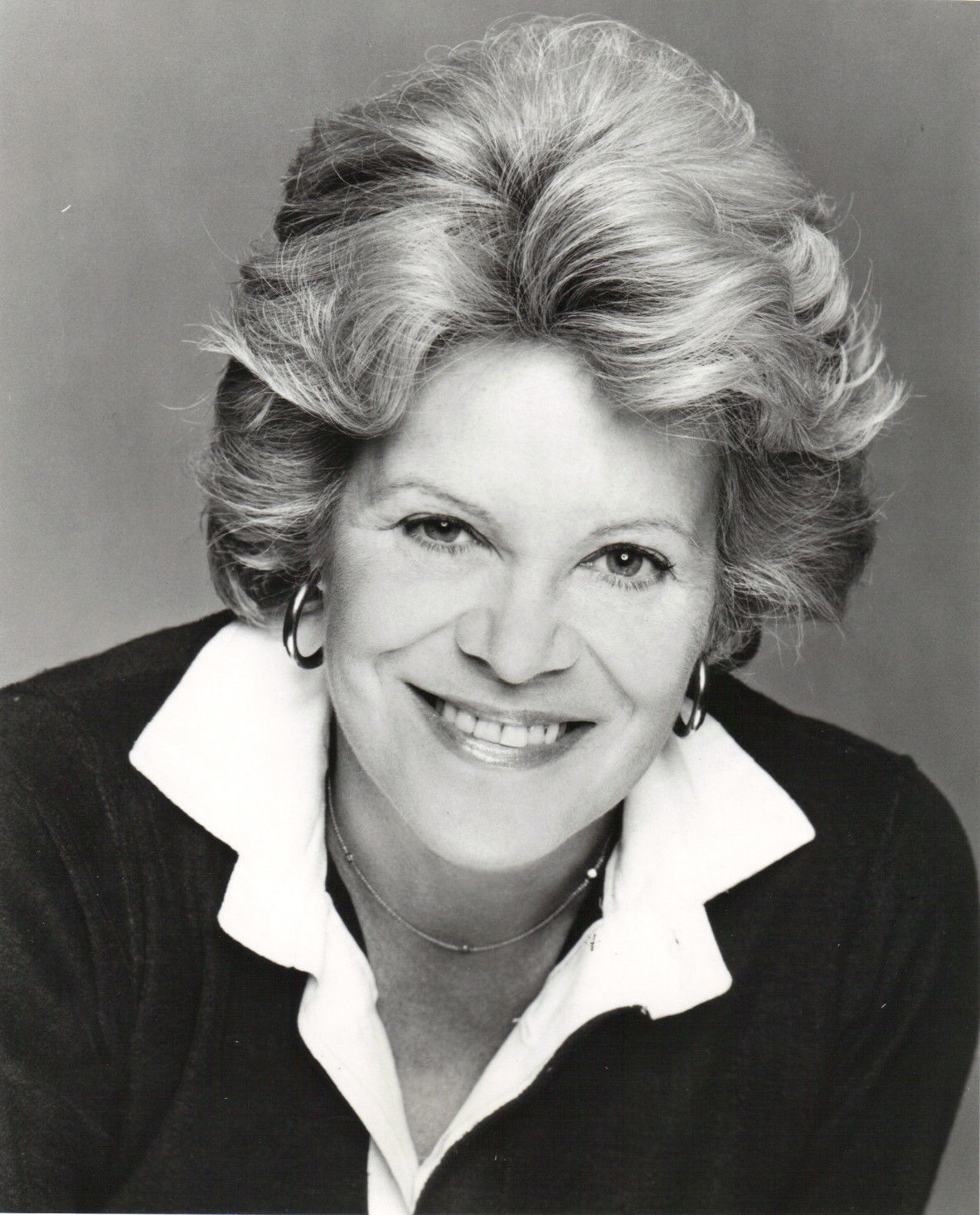
Rachel Roberts, Best Supporting Actress winner

=== BAFTA Fellowship ===
- **John Huston**

=== Outstanding British Contribution to Cinema ===
- **Children's Film Foundation**

=== Awards ===
Winners are listed first and highlighted in boldface.

**Best Film**: **Manhattan – Woody Allen**; Apocalypse Now – Francis Ford Coppola; The China Syndrome – James Bridges; The Deer Hunter – Michael Cimino	**Best Direction**: **Francis Ford Coppola – Apocalypse Now**; John Schlesinger – Yanks; Michael Cimino – The Deer Hunter; Woody Allen – Manhattan
**Best Actor in a Leading Role**: **Jack Lemmon – The China Syndrome as Jack Godell**; Martin Sheen – Apocalypse Now as Benjamin Willard; Robert De Niro – The Deer Hunter as Michael Vronsky; Woody Allen – Manhattan as Isaac Davis	**Best Actress in a Leading Role**: **Jane Fonda – The China Syndrome as Kimberly Wells**; Diane Keaton – Manhattan as Mary Wilkie; Maggie Smith – California Suite as Diana Barrie; Meryl Streep – The Deer Hunter as Linda
**Best Actor in a Supporting Role**: **Robert Duvall – Apocalypse Now as William Kilgore**; Christopher Walken – The Deer Hunter as Nikanor Chevotarevich; Denholm Elliott – Saint Jack as William Leigh; John Hurt – Alien as Kane	**Best Actress in a Supporting Role**: **Rachel Roberts – Yanks as Clarrie Moreton**; Lisa Eichhorn – The Europeans as Gertrude; Mariel Hemingway – Manhattan as Tracy; Meryl Streep – Manhattan as Jill Davis
**Best Screenplay**: **Manhattan – Woody Allen and Marshall Brickman**; The China Syndrome – Mike Gray, T. S. Cook and James Bridges; The Deer Hunter – Deric Washburn; Yanks – Colin Welland and Walter Bernstein	**Best Cinematography**: **The Deer Hunter – Vilmos Zsigmond**; Apocalypse Now – Vittorio Storaro; Manhattan – Gordon Willis; Yanks – Dick Bush
**Best Costume Design**: **Yanks – Shirley Ann Russell**; Agatha – Shirley Ann Russell; Alien – John Mollo; The Europeans – Judy Moorcroft	**Best Editing**: **The Deer Hunter – Peter Zinner**; Alien – Terry Rawlings; Apocalypse Now – Richard Marks, Walter Murch, Gerald B. Greenberg and Lisa Fruchtman; Manhattan – Susan E. Morse
**Best Original Music**: **Days of Heaven – Ennio Morricone**; Alien – Jerry Goldsmith; Apocalypse Now – Carmine Coppola and Francis Ford Coppola; Yanks – Richard Rodney Bennett	**Best Production Design**: **Alien – Michael Seymour**; Apocalypse Now – Dean Tavoularis; The Europeans – Jeremiah Rusconi; Yanks – Brian Morris
**Best Sound**: **Alien – Derrick Leather, Jim Shields and Bill Rowe**; Apocalypse Now – Nat Boxer, Richard Cirincione and Walter Murch; The Deer Hunter – Darin Knight, Jim Klinger and Richard Portman; Manhattan – James Sabat, Dan Sable and Jack Higgins	**Most Promising Newcomer to Leading Film Roles**: **Dennis Christopher – Breaking Away as Dave Stohler**; Gary Busey – The Buddy Holly Story as Buddy Holly; Ray Winstone – That Summer! as Steve Brodie; Sigourney Weaver – Alien as Ellen Ripley
**Best Documentary**: **The Tree of Wooden Clogs – Ermanno Olmi**; No other nominees	**Best Short Film**: **Butch Minds the Baby – Peter Webb**; Dilemma – Clive Mitchell; Dream Doll – Bob Godfrey; Mr. Pascal – Alison de Vere

== Statistics ==
Films that received multiple nominations
Nominations	Film
10	Manhattan
9	Apocalypse Now
9	The Deer Hunter
7	Alien
7	Yanks
4	The China Syndrome
3	The Europeans

Films that received multiple awards
Awards	Film
2	Alien
2	Apocalypse Now
2	The China Syndrome
2	The Deer Hunter
2	Manhattan
2	Yanks

== See also ==
- 52nd Academy Awards
- 5th César Awards
- 32nd Directors Guild of America Awards
- 37th Golden Globe Awards
- 6th Saturn Awards
- 32nd Writers Guild of America Awards
