= 31st Writers Guild of America Awards =

31st WGA Awards
- Date: 1979
- Organized by: Writers Guild of America, East and the Writers Guild of America, West

The 31st Writers Guild of America Awards honored the best film writers and television writers of 1978. Winners were announced in 1979.

== Winners and nominees ==
=== Film ===
Winners are listed first highlighted in boldface.

**Best Drama Written Directly for the Screen**: **Coming Home, Written by Waldo Salt and Robert C. Jones; Story by Nancy Dowd**; An Unmarried Woman, Written by Paul Mazursky; Days of Heaven, Written by Terrence Malick; The Deer Hunter, Written by Deric Washburn, Michael Cimino, Louis Garfinkle and Quinn K. Redeker; Interiors, Written by Woody Allen	**Best Comedy Written Directly for the Screen**: **Movie Movie, Written by Larry Gelbart and Sheldon Keller**; A Wedding, Screenplay by John Considine, Patricia Resnick, Allan F. Nicholls and Robert Altman; Story by Robert Altman and John Considine; House Calls, Screenplay by Max Shulman, Julius J. Epstein, Alan Mandel, and Charles Shyer; Story by Max Shulman and Julius J. Epstein; National Lampoon's Animal House, Written by Harold Ramis, Douglas Kenney and Chris Miller; Once in Paris..., Written by Frank D. Gilroy
**Best Drama Adapted from Another Medium**: **Midnight Express, Screenplay by Oliver Stone; Based on the book by Billy Hayes and William Hoffer**; Bloodbrothers, Screenplay by Walter Newman; Based on the novel by Richard Price; Go Tell the Spartans, Screenplay by Wendell Mayes; Based on de novel by Daniel Ford; Invasion of the Body Snatchers, Screenplay by W.D. Richter; Based on the novel by Jack Finney; Who'll Stop the Rain, Screenplay by Judith Rascoe and Robert Stone; Based on the novel by Robert Stone	**Best Comedy Adapted from Another Medium**: **Heaven Can Wait, Screenplay by Elaine May and Warren Beatty; Based on the play by Harry Segall**; California Suite, Screenplay by Neil Simon; Based on his play; Same Time, Next Year, Screenplay by Bernard Slade; Based on his play; Superman, Screenplay by Mario Puzo, David Newman, Leslie Newman and Robert Benton; Based on the character created by Jerry Siegel and Joe Shuster; Who Is Killing the Great Chefs of Europe?, Screenplay by Peter Stone; Based on the novel by Nan Lyons and Ivan Lyons

=== Television ===
**Episodic Comedy**: **"Baby, It's Cold Outside" – M*A*S*H (CBS) – Gary David Goldberg**; "California, Here We Are" – All in the Family (CBS) – Milt Josefsberg, Phil Sharp, Bob Schiller and Bob Weiskopf; "The Ghost" – Barney Miller (ABC) – Reinhold Weege; "Point of View" – M*A*S*H (CBS) – Ken Levine and David Isaacs; "Pilot" – Mork & Mindy (ABC) – Dale McRaven; "Rhoda vs. Ida" – Rhoda (CBS) – Bob Ellison; "Memories of Cab 804: Part 1 & 2" – Taxi (ABC) – Barry Kemp; "Blind Date" – Taxi (ABC) – Michael Leeson	**Episodic Drama**: **"Prisoner" – Lou Grant (CBS) – Seth Freeman**; "The Conspirators" – Columbo (NBC) – Howard Berk; "Murder" – Lou Grant (CBS) – Gary David Goldberg; "The House on Willis Avenue" – The Rockford Files (NBC) – Stephen J. Cannell; "The Illusion" – The Waltons (CBS) – John McGreevey; "The Captive" – The Waltons (CBS) – Ray Cunneff
**Daytime Serials**: **Ryan's Hope (ABC) – Claire Labine, Jeffrey Lane, Paul Avila Mayer, Mary Munisteri and Judith Pinsker**; Love of Life (CBS) – Gabrielle Upton; One Life to Live (ABC) – Lanie Bertram, Margaret DePriest, Marisa Gioffre, Sam Hall, Peggy O'Shea, Gordon Russell and Don Wallace	**Children's Script - Episodic & Specials**: **"Mom and Dad Can't Hear Me" – ABC Afterschool Special (ABC) – Irma Reichert and Daryl Warner**; Christmas Eve on Sesame Street (PBS) – Jon Stone and Joseph A. Bailey; "The Tap Dance Kid" – NBC Special Treat (NBC) – Barra Grant
**Anthology Adaptation**: **A Christmas to Remember (CBS) – Stewart Stern; Based on the novel by Glendon Swarthout**; **A Woman Called Moses (NBC) – Lonne Elder III; Based on the book by Marc Heidish**	**Anthology Adaptation**: **Scott Joplin (NBC) – Christopher Knopf**
**Variety: Series or Special: Musical or Comedy**: **"Steve Martin and Betty White" – The Carol Burnett Show (CBS) – Roger Beatty, Rick Hawkins, Liz Sage, Bob Illes, James R. Stein, Franelle Silver, Larry Siegel, Tim Conway, Bill Richmond, Gene Perret, Dick Clair, Jenna McMahon and Ed Simmons**

=== Special awards ===
Laurel Award for Screenwriting Achievement
**Neil Simon**
Laurel Award for TV Writing Achievement
**James Costigan**
Valentine Davies Award
**Melville Shavelson**
Morgan Cox Award
**George Seaton**
