= 36th Golden Globe Awards =

Film award ceremony in 1979

- Date: January 27, 1979

Highlights
- Best Film: Drama: Midnight Express
- Best Film: Musical or Comedy: Heaven Can Wait
- Best Drama Series: 60 Minutes
- Best Musical or Comedy Series: Taxi

The 36th Golden Globe Awards, honoring the best in film and television for 1978, were held on January 27, 1979. The ceremony was not televised.

== Winners and nominees ==
=== Film ===
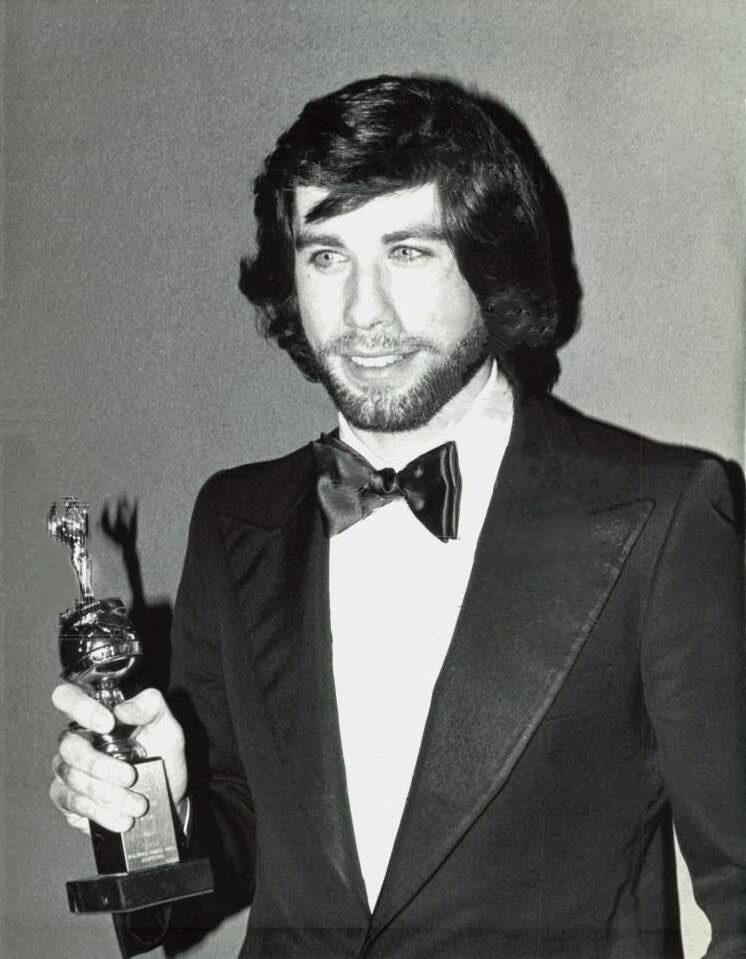
John Travolta with a special Golden Globe as 'World Film Favorites', which he received along with Jane Fonda.

Best Motion Picture
Drama	Comedy or Musical
Midnight Express; Coming Home; Days of Heaven; The Deer Hunter; An Unmarried Woman	Heaven Can Wait; California Suite; Foul Play; Grease; Movie Movie
Best Performance in a Motion Picture – Drama
Actor	Actress
Jon Voight – Coming Home as Luke Martin; Brad Davis – Midnight Express as Billy Hayes; Robert De Niro – The Deer Hunter as Michael Vronsky; Anthony Hopkins – Magic as Corky Withers / "Fats"; Gregory Peck – The Boys from Brazil as Dr. Josef Mengele	Jane Fonda – Coming Home as Sally Hyde; Ingrid Bergman – Autumn Sonata as Charlotte Andergast; Jill Clayburgh – An Unmarried Woman as Erica; Glenda Jackson – Stevie as Stevie Smith; Geraldine Page – Interiors as Eve
Best Performance in a Motion Picture – Comedy or Musical
Actor	Actress
Warren Beatty – Heaven Can Wait as Joe Pendleton; Alan Alda – Same Time, Next Year as George; Gary Busey – The Buddy Holly Story as Buddy Holly; Chevy Chase – Foul Play as Det. Tony Carlson; George C. Scott – Movie Movie as Gloves Malloy / Spats Baxter; John Travolta – Grease as Danny Zuko	Ellen Burstyn – Same Time, Next Year as Doris (TIE); Maggie Smith – California Suite as Diana Barrie (TIE); Jacqueline Bisset – Who Is Killing the Great Chefs of Europe? as Natasha O'Brien; Goldie Hawn – Foul Play as Gloria Mundy; Olivia Newton-John – Grease as Sandy Olsson
Best Supporting Performance in a Motion Picture – Drama, Comedy or Musical
Supporting Actor	Supporting Actress
John Hurt – Midnight Express as Max; Bruce Dern – Coming Home as Bob Hyde; Dudley Moore – Foul Play as Stanley Tibbets; Robert Morley – Who Is Killing the Great Chefs of Europe? as Max; Christopher Walken – The Deer Hunter as Cpl. Nikanor "Nick" Chevotarevich	Dyan Cannon – Heaven Can Wait as Julia Farnsworth; Carol Burnett – A Wedding as Tulip Brenner; Maureen Stapleton – Interiors as Pearl; Meryl Streep – The Deer Hunter as Linda; Mona Washbourne – Stevie as Aunt
Other
Best Director	Best Screenplay
Michael Cimino – The Deer Hunter; Woody Allen – Interiors; Hal Ashby – Coming Home; Terrence Malick – Days of Heaven; Paul Mazursky – An Unmarried Woman; Alan Parker – Midnight Express	Midnight Express – Oliver Stone; Coming Home – Robert C. Jones and Waldo Salt; The Deer Hunter – Deric Washburn; Foul Play – Colin Higgins; Interiors – Woody Allen; An Unmarried Woman – Paul Mazursky
Best Original Score	Best Original Song
Midnight Express – Giorgio Moroder; The Children of Sanchez – Chuck Mangione; The Lord of the Rings – Leonard Rosenman; Superman – John Williams; An Unmarried Woman – Bill Conti	"Last Dance" (Paul Jabara) – Thank God It's Friday; "Grease" (Barry Gibb) – Grease; "The Last Time I Felt Like This" (Marvin Hamlisch, Alan and Marilyn Bergman) – Same Time, Next Year; "Ready to Take a Chance Again" (Charles Fox, Norman Gimbel) – Foul Play; "You're the One That I Want" (John Farrar) – Grease
New Star of the Year – Actor	New Star of the Year – Actress
Brad Davis – Midnight Express as Billy Hayes; Chevy Chase – Foul Play as Det. Tony Carlson; Harry Hamlin – Movie Movie as Joey Popchik; Doug McKeon – Uncle Joe Shannon as Robbie; Eric Roberts – King of the Gypsies as Dave Stepanowicz; Andrew Stevens – The Boys in Company C as Billy Ray Pike	Irene Miracle – Midnight Express as Susan; Anne Ditchburn – Slow Dancing in the Big City as Sarah Gantz; Annie Potts – Corvette Summer as Vanessa; Anita Skinner – Girlfriends as Jean Moreton; Mary Steenburgen – Goin' South as Julie Tate
Best Foreign Film
Autumn Sonata (Sweden); Death on the Nile (England); Dona Flor and Her Two Husbands (Brazil); A Dream of Passion (Greece); Get Out Your Handkerchiefs (France); Lemon Popsicle (Israel)

The following films received multiple nominations:

Nominations	Title
8	Midnight Express
7	Foul Play
6	Coming Home
6	The Deer Hunter
5	An Unmarried Woman
5	Grease
4	Interiors
3	Heaven Can Wait
3	Movie Movie
3	Same Time, Next Year
2	Autumn Sonata
2	California Suite
2	Days of Heaven
2	Stevie
2	Who Is Killing the Great Chefs of Europe?

The following films received multiple wins:

Wins	Title
6	Midnight Express
3	Heaven Can Wait
2	Coming Home

=== Television ===
Best Television Series
Drama	Musical or Comedy
60 Minutes: Battlestar Galactica; Family; Holocaust; Lou Grant	Taxi: Alice; All in the Family; The Love Boat; Three's Company
Best Performance in a Television Series Drama
Actor	Actress
Michael Moriarty - Holocaust as Eric Dorf: Ed Asner - Lou Grant as Lou Grant; James Garner - The Rockford Files as Jim Rockford; Richard Hatch - Battlestar Galactica as Captain Apollo; John Houseman - The Paper Chase as Professor Charles W. Kingsfield, Jr.; Michael Landon - Little House on the Prairie as Charles Ingalls	Rosemary Harris - Holocaust as Berta Palitz Weiss: Kate Jackson - Charlie's Angels as Sabrina Duncan; Kristy McNichol - Family as Leticia "Buddy" Lawrence; Lee Remick - Wheels as Erica Trenton; Sada Thompson - Family as Kate Lawrence
Best Performance in a Television Series – Musical or Comedy
Actor	Actress
Robin Williams - Mork & Mindy as Mork: Alan Alda - M*A*S*H as Benjamin Franklin "Hawkeye" Pierce; Gavin MacLeod - The Love Boat as Captain Merrill Stubing; Judd Hirsch - Taxi as Alex Reiger; John Ritter - Three's Company as Jack Tripper	Linda Lavin - Alice as Alice Hyatt: Carol Burnett - The Carol Burnett Show as Various Characters; Penny Marshall - Laverne & Shirley as Laverne DeFazio; Suzanne Somers - Three's Company as Chrissy Snow; Jean Stapleton - All in the Family as Edith Bunker
Best Supporting Performance in a Series, Miniseries or Television Film
Supporting Actor	Supporting Actress
Norman Fell - Three's Company as Stanley Roper: Jeff Conaway - Taxi as Bobby Wheeler; Danny DeVito - Taxi as Louie De Palma; Pat Harrington Jr. - One Day at a Time as Dwayne Schneider; Andy Kaufman - Taxi as Latka Gravas	Polly Holliday - Alice as Florence "Flo" Castleberry: Marilu Henner - Taxi as Elaine O'Connor Nardo; Julie Kavner - Rhoda as Brenda Morgenstern; Linda Kelsey - Lou Grant as Billie Newman; Audra Lindley - Three's Company as Helen Roper; Nancy Walker - Rhoda as Ida Morgenstern

The following programs received multiple nominations:

Nominations	Title
6	Taxi
4	Three's Company
3	Alice
3	Family
3	Holocaust
3	Lou Grant
2	All in the Family
2	Battlestar Galactica
2	The Love Boat
2	Rhoda

The following programs received multiple wins:

Wins	Title
2	Alice
2	Holocaust

=== Cecil B. DeMille Award ===
Lucille Ball

== See also ==
- 51st Academy Awards
- 30th Primetime Emmy Awards
- 31st Primetime Emmy Awards
- 32nd British Academy Film Awards
- 33rd Tony Awards
- 1978 in film
- 1978 in television
