= California Suite (film) =

1978 anthology comedy film

- Theatrical release poster by Drew Struzan
- Directed by: Herbert Ross
- Written by: Neil Simon
- Based on: California Suite by Neil Simon
- Produced by: Ray Stark
- Starring: Alan Alda; Michael Caine; Bill Cosby; Jane Fonda; Walter Matthau; Elaine May; Richard Pryor; Maggie Smith
- Cinematography: David M. Walsh
- Edited by: Michael A. Stevenson
- Music by: Claude Bolling
- Production company: Rastar
- Distributed by: Columbia Pictures
- Release date: December 22, 1978
- Running time: 103 minutes
- Country: United States
- Language: English
- Box office: $42.9 million

California Suite is a 1978 American anthology comedy film directed by Herbert Ross. The screenplay by Neil Simon is based on his 1976 play. Similar in format to Simon's earlier work Plaza Suite, the film follows four separate stories involving guests staying in a suite in a luxury hotel.

The film stars Alan Alda, Michael Caine, Bill Cosby, Jane Fonda, Walter Matthau, Elaine May, Richard Pryor and Maggie Smith. The movie was released in December 1978, and received mixed reviews.

It received three Academy Award nominations, including Best Adapted Screenplay for Simon, with Maggie Smith winning Best Supporting Actress. Smith also won the Golden Globe Award for Best Actress in a Motion Picture – Musical or Comedy, and the film was nominated for Best Motion Picture – Musical or Comedy.

== Plot ==
The film depicts four separate stories involving guests staying at The Beverly Hills Hotel.

In "Visitors from New York", Hannah Warren is a Manhattan workaholic who flies to Los Angeles to retrieve her teenage daughter Jenny after she leaves home to live with her successful screenwriter father Bill. The bickering, divorced couple are forced to decide on what living arrangements are best for the girl.

In "Visitors from London", Diana Barrie is a British actress and a first-time nominee for the Academy Award for Best Actress in an independent British film, an honor that could revive her faltering career, but she knows that she has no chance of winning. She is in deep denial about the true nature of her marriage of convenience to Sidney Cochran, a once-closeted gay antique dealer who has become increasingly indiscreet about his sexuality. As she prepares for her moment in the spotlight, her mood fluctuates from hope to panic to despair.

In "Visitors from Philadelphia", conservative, middle-aged businessman Marvin Michaels awakens to discover a prostitute named Bunny—an unexpected gift from his brother Harry—unconscious in his bed. With his wife Millie on her way up to the suite, he must find a way to conceal all traces of his brother's indiscretion.

In "Visitors from Chicago", Dr. Chauncey Gump and his wife Lola and Dr. Willis Panama and his wife Bettina are taking a much-needed vacation together. Things begin to unravel quickly when things begin to go wrong and the two men decide to settle their differences by engaging in a very competitive tennis match.

== Cast ==
- Alan Alda as Bill Warren
- Michael Caine as Sidney Cochran
- Bill Cosby as Dr. Willis Panama
- Jane Fonda as Hannah Warren
- Walter Matthau as Marvin Michaels
- Elaine May as Millie Michaels
- Richard Pryor as Dr. Chauncey Gump
- Maggie Smith as Diana Barrie
- Herb Edelman as Harry Michaels
- Sheila Frazier as Bettina Panama
- Gloria Gifford as Lola Gump
- Denise Galik as Bunny
- Christopher Pennock as policeman
- Dana Plato as Jenny Warren
- Kelly Harmon as stewardess
- James Coburn as Film Pilot (uncredited)
- Richard Burton as Himself (uncredited)

== Production ==
The film was shot on location in April 1978, at The Beverly Hills Hotel, the Dorothy Chandler Pavilion at the Los Angeles Music Center, Warner Bros. Studios Burbank and along Rodeo Drive. The arrival of Diana Barrie (Maggie Smith) and Sidney Cochran (Michael Caine) at the Academy Awards was shot at the actual 50th Academy Awards, where in real life, Michael Caine and Maggie Smith were the presenters of the Best Supporting Actor award. The California-themed paintings seen in the opening credits are by pop artist David Hockney.

== Reception ==
On the review aggregator website Rotten Tomatoes, 50% of 28 critics' reviews are positive, with an average rating of 5.2/10. The website's consensus reads: "Maggie Smith's acidic turn is the standout in this stacked ensemble, but broad characterizations and an unsure tone make for a disappointingly uneven adaptation of Neil Simon's episodic play." The New York Times placed the film on its Best 1000 Movies Ever list.

Film critic Vincent Canby called California Suite "the most agreeably realized Simon film in years", and added, "Here is Mr. Simon in top form, under the direction of Herbert Ross, one of the few directors...who can cope with the particular demands of material that simultaneously means to be touching and so nonstop clever one sometimes wants to gag him. It all works in California Suite, not only because the material is superior Simon, but also because the writer and the director have assembled a dream cast."

Variety observed, "Neil Simon and Herbert Ross have gambled in radically altering the successful format of California Suite as it appeared on stage. Instead of four separate playlets, there is now one semi-cohesive narrative revolving around visitors to the Beverly Hills Hotel...The technique is less than successful, veering from poignant emotionalism to broad slapstick in sudden shifts."

David Pirie from Time Out described the film as a "quick and varied comedy, highly suited to Neil Simon's machine-gun gag-writing", and added, "Fonda provides the film with its centre, giving another performance of unnerving sureness. Also on the credit side is a bedroom farce of epic proportions from Matthau and May. The other vignettes are a bit glum."

Melvin Frankel from Gay Community News wrote that "on the surface of it, Neil Simon seems to be adventurous, this time, expanding his art, to the point of including a somewhat unusual portrait of a gay man; but the film gets stranded midway between hard social commentary and the aim to please those he's criticizing."

In his annual movie guide, Leonard Maltin gave the film three stars out of four, and described it as a "pleasant time-filler, with a nice jazz score by Claude Bolling". He also felt that "gently bickering" Smith and Caine came off best, while "unfunnily combative" Richard Pryor and Bill Cosby came off worst.

== Awards and nominations ==
Award	Category	Nominee(s)	Result	Ref.
Academy Awards	Best Supporting Actress	Maggie Smith	Won	
Academy Awards	Best Adapted Screenplay	Neil Simon	Nominated	
Academy Awards	Best Production Design	Albert Brenner and Marvin March	Nominated	
British Academy Film Awards	Best Actress in a Leading Role	Maggie Smith	Nominated	
Evening Standard British Film Awards	Best Actress	Maggie Smith	Won	
Golden Globe Awards	Best Motion Picture – Musical or Comedy		Nominated	
Golden Globe Awards	Best Actress in a Motion Picture – Musical or Comedy	Maggie Smith	Won (Note: Tied with Ellen Burstyn for Same Time, Next Year.)	
Kansas City Film Critics Circle Awards	Best Supporting Actress	Maggie Smith	Won	
Los Angeles Film Critics Association Awards	Best Actress	Jane Fonda (Note: Also for Comes a Horseman and Coming Home)	Won	
National Society of Film Critics Awards	Best Actor	Michael Caine	4th Place	
National Society of Film Critics Awards	Best Actress	Jane Fonda	2nd Place	
National Society of Film Critics Awards	Best Actress	Maggie Smith	4th Place	
National Society of Film Critics Awards	Best Supporting Actress	Maggie Smith	3rd Place	
New York Film Critics Circle Awards	Best Supporting Actress	Maggie Smith	Runner-up	
Writers Guild of America Awards	Best Comedy – Adapted from Another Medium	Neil Simon	Nominated	

== Home media ==
California Suite was released in the United States on VHS by Columbia Pictures in 1983, and on DVD in both fullscreen and widescreen formats on January 2, 2002.

== See also ==
- Plaza Suite
- London Suite
- List of LGBTQ-related films of 1978
- List of American films of 1978
