= 1978 New York Film Critics Circle Awards =

44th New York Film Critics Circle Awards

44th New York Film Critics Circle Awards

January 28, 1979

Best Picture:
The Deer Hunter

The 44th New York Film Critics Circle Awards honored the best filmmaking of 1978. The winners were announced on 20 December 1978 and the awards were given on 28 January 1979.

== Winners ==
- Best Actor:
  - Jon Voight - Coming Home
  - Runners-up: Gary Busey - The Buddy Holly Story and Robert De Niro - The Deer Hunter
- Best Actress:
  - Ingrid Bergman - Autumn Sonata (Höstsonaten)
  - Runners-up: Jill Clayburgh - An Unmarried Woman and Jane Fonda - Coming Home and Comes a Horseman
- Best Director:
  - Terrence Malick - Days of Heaven
  - Runners-up: Paul Mazursky - An Unmarried Woman and Ingmar Bergman - Autumn Sonata (Höstsonaten)
- Best Film:
  - The Deer Hunter
  - Runners-up: Days of Heaven and An Unmarried Woman
- Best Foreign Language Film:
  - Bread and Chocolate (Pane e cioccolata) • Italy
  - Runners-up: Autumn Sonata (Höstsonaten) and A Slave of Love (Raba lyubvi)
- Best Screenplay:
  - Paul Mazursky - An Unmarried Woman
  - Runners-up: Larry Gelbart and Sheldon Keller - Movie Movie, Franco Brusati, Jaja Fiastri and Nino Manfredi - Bread and Chocolate (Pane e cioccolata) and Bertrand Blier - Get Out Your Handkerchiefs (Préparez vos mouchoirs)
- Best Supporting Actor:
  - Christopher Walken - The Deer Hunter
  - Runners-up: Richard Farnsworth - Comes a Horseman and Barry Bostwick - Movie Movie
- Best Supporting Actress:
  - Maureen Stapleton - Interiors
  - Runners-up: Maggie Smith - California Suite and Meryl Streep - The Deer Hunter
