= 1978 National Society of Film Critics Awards =

Annual US film award ceremony

13th NSFC Awards

January 4, 1979

Best Film:
Get Out Your Handkerchiefs

The 13th National Society of Film Critics Awards, given on 4 January 1979, honored the best filmmaking of 1978.

== Winners ==
=== Best Picture ===
1. Get Out Your Handkerchiefs (Préparez vos mouchoirs)
2. The Deer Hunter
2. An Unmarried Woman
4. Days of Heaven

=== Best Director ===
1. Terrence Malick – Days of Heaven
2. Bertrand Blier – Get Out Your Handkerchiefs (Préparez vos mouchoirs)
3. Michael Cimino – The Deer Hunter

=== Best Actor ===
1. Gary Busey – The Buddy Holly Story
2. Jon Voight – Coming Home
3. Nick Nolte – Who'll Stop the Rain
4. Michael Caine – California Suite
5. Robert De Niro – The Deer Hunter

=== Best Actress ===
1. Ingrid Bergman – Autumn Sonata (Höstsonaten)
2. Jane Fonda – Coming Home, Comes a Horseman and California Suite
3. Jill Clayburgh – An Unmarried Woman
4. Maggie Smith – California Suite

=== Best Supporting Actor ===
1. Richard Farnsworth – Comes a Horseman
1. Robert Morley – Who Is Killing the Great Chefs of Europe?
3. Christopher Walken – The Deer Hunter
4. Barry Bostwick – Movie Movie

=== Best Supporting Actress ===
1. Meryl Streep – The Deer Hunter
2. Maureen Stapleton – Interiors
3. Maggie Smith – California Suite

=== Best Screenplay ===
1. Paul Mazursky – An Unmarried Woman
2. Bertrand Blier – Get Out Your Handkerchiefs (Préparez vos mouchoirs)
3. Larry Gelbart and Sheldon Keller – Movie Movie
4. W.D. Richter – Invasion of the Body Snatchers
5. Woody Allen – Interiors

=== Best Cinematography ===
- Néstor Almendros – Days of Heaven

=== Special Citation ===
- The Battle of Chile (La batalla de Chile)
