= Quinn Redeker =

American actor, screenwriter (1936–2022)

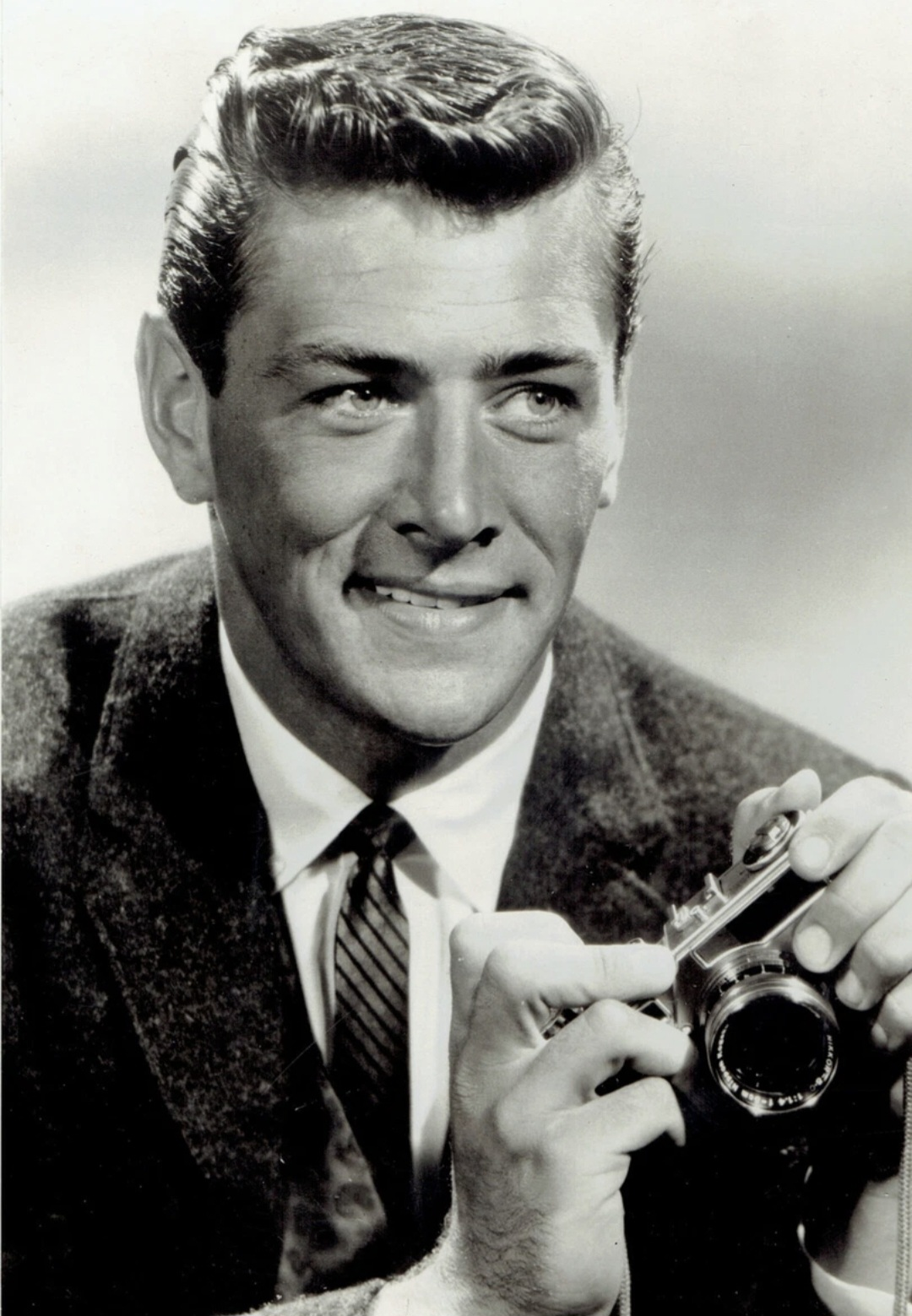
- Redeker in Dan Raven, 1960
- Born: May 2, 1936; Woodstock, Illinois, U.S.
- Died: December 20, 2022 (aged 86); Los Angeles, California, U.S.
- Occupations: Actor; screenwriter
- Years active: 1960–2022
- Awards: Soap Opera Digest Award (1983); Outstanding Actor in a Supporting Role for The Young and the Restless

Quinn Redeker (May 2, 1936 – December 20, 2022) was an American actor and screenwriter, best known for his work on daytime dramas.

== Life and career ==
Redeker and Lou Garfinkle co-authored the story for the 1978 film The Deer Hunter. In 1960, Redeker was cast as a photographer on the short-lived NBC crime drama Dan Raven starring Skip Homeier and Dan Barton. The following year, he appeared as nerdy Schulyer Davis in the film The Three Stooges Meet Hercules.

On television, he amassed appearances on over five dozen television series. He is best known for his roles as Alex Marshall on Days of Our Lives, whom he played from 1979 to 1987, and on The Young and the Restless where he played Nick Reed in 1979, Joseph Taylor from 1979 to 1980, and his best-known character, Rex Sterling, from 1987 to 2004.

Redecker's friendship with Robert Redford also saw him play supporting roles in three of Redford's films: The Candidate (1972), The Electric Horseman (1979) and Ordinary People (1980), where he played Mary Tyler Moore's brother.

== Death ==
Redeker died on December 20, 2022, at the age of 86. He was interred at Los Angeles National Cemetery.

== Awards ==
As a writer, Redeker was nominated for an Academy Award for Best Original Screenplay and a WGA Award for Best Drama Written Directly for the Screenplay for The Deer Hunter, along with Deric Washburn, Louis A. Garfinkle and Michael Cimino.

As an actor, Redeker was twice nominated for a Daytime Emmy Award for Outstanding Supporting Actor in a Drama Series for his role on The Young and the Restless, both in 1989 and 1990. He also was a two-time winner at the Soap Opera Digest Awards, taking the 1983 Soapy Award (last year they used that name) for Best Villain for his role on Days of our Lives, along with the 1989 award for "Outstanding Actor in a Supporting Role: Daytime" for The Young and the Restless.

== Filmography ==
List of television and film performances by Quinn Redeker
Year	Title	Role	Notes
1960	Sea Hunt	USCG Lt. Bob Camp / Joey	television; 2 episodes
1961	The Marriage-Go-Round	Crewcut – Party Guest	film; Uncredited
1962	The Three Stooges Meet Hercules	Schuyler Davis	film
1962	The Virginian	Daniel Kroeger	Episode: "Impasse"
1967	Spider Baby	Peter Howe	film shot in 1964
1970	Airport	John Reindel	film; Uncredited
1970	The Christine Jorgensen Story	Tom Crawford	film
1971	The Andromeda Strain	Capt. Morris	film; Uncredited
1972	The Candidate	Rich Jenkin	film
1972	The Limit	Jeff McMillan	
1972	Adam-12	Officer. Charlie Burnside	Episode: "Badge Heavy"
1973	The Slams	Warden	film
1974	The Midnight Man	Swanson	film
1974–1978	Barnaby Jones	various	television; 4 episodes
1975	At Long Last Love	Kitty's Boyfriend	film
1975	Starsky & Hutch	Dr. Melford	television
1977	Rollercoaster	Owner No. 2	film
1979	The Electric Horseman	Bud Broderick	film
1980	Where the Buffalo Roam	Pilot	film
1980	Ordinary People	Ward	film
1980	Coast to Coast	Benjamin Levrington	film
2003	An American Reunion	Coach Grayman	
2006	Sweet Deadly Dreams	Blaisdale	
2008	For Heaven's Sake	Prof. Harris	film
2009	The Confessional	Father Mills	
2012	Big Miracle	President Reagan	film
