= Mississippi Queen (bar) =

- Address: Bangkok; Thailand
- Location: Patpong
- Owner: Tony Douglas
- Type: Go-go bar

Construction
- Opened: 1973
- Closed: 1980s

The Mississippi Queen bar was a go-go bar in Bangkok's redlight district Patpong. It was well known in the 1970s among the expatriate community, and was featured in the Oscar-winning film The Deer Hunter.
