= The Young Guns (film) =

1956 film by Albert Band

- Theatrical release poster
- Directed by: Albert Band
- Written by: Louis A. Garfinkle
- Produced by: Richard V. Heermance
- Starring: Russ Tamblyn; Gloria Talbott; Perry Lopez; Scott Marlowe; Wright King; Walter Coy
- Cinematography: Ellsworth Fredericks
- Edited by: George White
- Music by: Marlin Skiles
- Production company: Allied Artists Pictures
- Distributed by: Allied Artists Pictures
- Release date: September 12, 1956
- Running time: 84 minutes
- Country: United States
- Language: English

The Young Guns is a 1956 American Western film directed by Albert Band and written by Louis A. Garfinkle. The film stars Russ Tamblyn, Gloria Talbott, Perry Lopez, Scott Marlowe, Wright King and Walter Coy. The film was released on September 12, 1956, by Allied Artists Pictures.

== Cast ==
- Russ Tamblyn as Tully Rice
- Gloria Talbott as Nora Bawdre
- Perry Lopez as San Antone
- Scott Marlowe as Knox Cutler
- Wright King as "Jonesy" Jones
- Walter Coy as Sheriff Jim Peyton
- Chubby Johnson as Rongo Jones / Grandpa
- Myron Healey as Deputy Nix
- Jim Goodwin as Georgie Briggs
- Rayford Barnes as "Kid" Cutler
- I. Stanford Jolley as Felix Briggs
- Emory Parnell as Padgett
- Tom London as Lookout

== Production ==
The film was based on a story by Albert Band and Lou Garfinkle. In 1955 it was bought by Hayes Gotez who would produce the film for Allied Artists.

Gloria Talbot was cast in March 1956. The film was called "A Western about juvenile delinquency." Tamblyn was borrowed from MGM. It was his first lead role since The Kid From Cleveland.

== Reception ==
The Los Angeles Times called it "chillingly violent if not always coherent."

In 1956 Band and Garfinkle signed a six picture deal with Allied. In 1957 Band and Garfinkle bought the rights to the film to turn it into a TV series.
