= I Bury the Living =

1958 film by Albert Band

- Directed by: Albert Band
- Written by: Louis A. Garfinkle
- Produced by: Louis A. Garfinkle; Albert Band
- Starring: Richard Boone; Theodore Bikel
- Cinematography: Frederick Gately
- Edited by: Frank Sullivan
- Music by: Gerald Fried
- Distributed by: United Artists
- Release date: July 1958
- Running time: 76 minutes
- Country: United States
- Language: English

I Bury the Living is a 1958 horror film directed by famed B movie director Albert Band and starring Richard Boone and Theodore Bikel. It was written by Louis A. Garfinkle and produced by Garfinkle and Band.

== Plot ==
Robert Kraft is the newly appointed chairman of a committee that oversees a large cemetery. The cemetery caretaker, Andy MacKee, keeps a map in the cemetery office displaying the grounds and each gravesite. Filled graves are marked by black pins and unoccupied but sold graves are marked with white pins. New to the position and unobservant, Kraft accidentally places a pair of black pins where they don't belong, only to discover later that the young couple who had bought the grave sites in question died in an automobile accident soon afterwards. He believes that he marked them for death.

Hoping it will give him peace of mind, Robert replaces a random white pin with a black pin. When that person dies later in the week, however, he becomes increasingly convinced that either he or the map wield some kind of dark power. Repeated experiments, undertaken upon the insistence of skeptical friends and co-workers, yield the same result. Kraft slips into deep guilt and depression and believes he is cursed.

The police, who are initially skeptical, eventually begin to take notice and, in the hopes that it will reveal the cause of the deaths, ask Robert to place a black pin on the grave of a person who is known to be in France. Although he does so, Robert continues his slide into despair. That same night, he decides that if black pins give him the power of death, white pins might give him the power of life. He replaces all of the recently placed black pins with white pins. When he goes to the associated grave sites later that night, he discovers that all are open, with the bodies gone.

Upon returning to the cemetery office, Robert receives a call informing him of the death of the man in France. As he hangs up the phone, the cemetery caretaker comes up behind him, covered in dirt. He reveals that he has been killing all of the marked people as revenge for being forced to retire. However, when Robert informs him of the death of the man in France, the caretaker, who couldn't have killed the man, begins to lose his mind, and collapses. When the police arrive, they find the caretaker dead and tell Robert that the news of the man's death was all a ruse to flush out the cemetery caretaker.

== Cast ==
- Richard Boone as Robert Kraft
- Theodore Bikel as Andy McKee
- Peggy Maurer as Ann Craig
- Howard Smith as George Kraft
- Herbert Anderson as Jess Jessup
- Robert Osterloh as Lt. Clayborne

== Production ==
The film's music was composed by Gerald Fried. The film was shot by Frederick Gately and edited by Frank Sullivan.

== Release ==
I Bury the Living was released in July 1958 by United Artists.

== Reception ==
On Rotten Tomatoes it has an approval rating of 64% based on reviews from 11 critics.

SFX critic Ian Berriman noted that I Bury the Living was "basically just like an extended episode of The Twilight Zone, but that's no bad thing, since it's like a good episode".

Film Threat said, "With a title like I Bury the Living (1958), one would think this picture should be sleazy 50’s horror fare; a product of Corman or at least AIP, but it is actually a pretty tense little psychological thriller". The review expressed disappointment with the film's ending, but praised its "dark, moody cinematography", "sometimes striking if sparse visual design" and "ominous music".

== Legacy ==
In his 1981 non-fiction book Danse Macabre, horror author Stephen King listed I Bury the Living as one of the scariest films ever made, but criticized the ending. In the foreword to King's short story "Obits", published in 2015 in his The Bazaar of Bad Dreams collection, he referenced I Bury the Living and noted that the story was inspired by the film.
