= St. Theodosius Russian Orthodox Cathedral =

Eastern Orthodox cathedral in Ohio, United States

St. Theodosius Orthodox Christian Cathedral
- Собор Святого Феодосия (Russian)
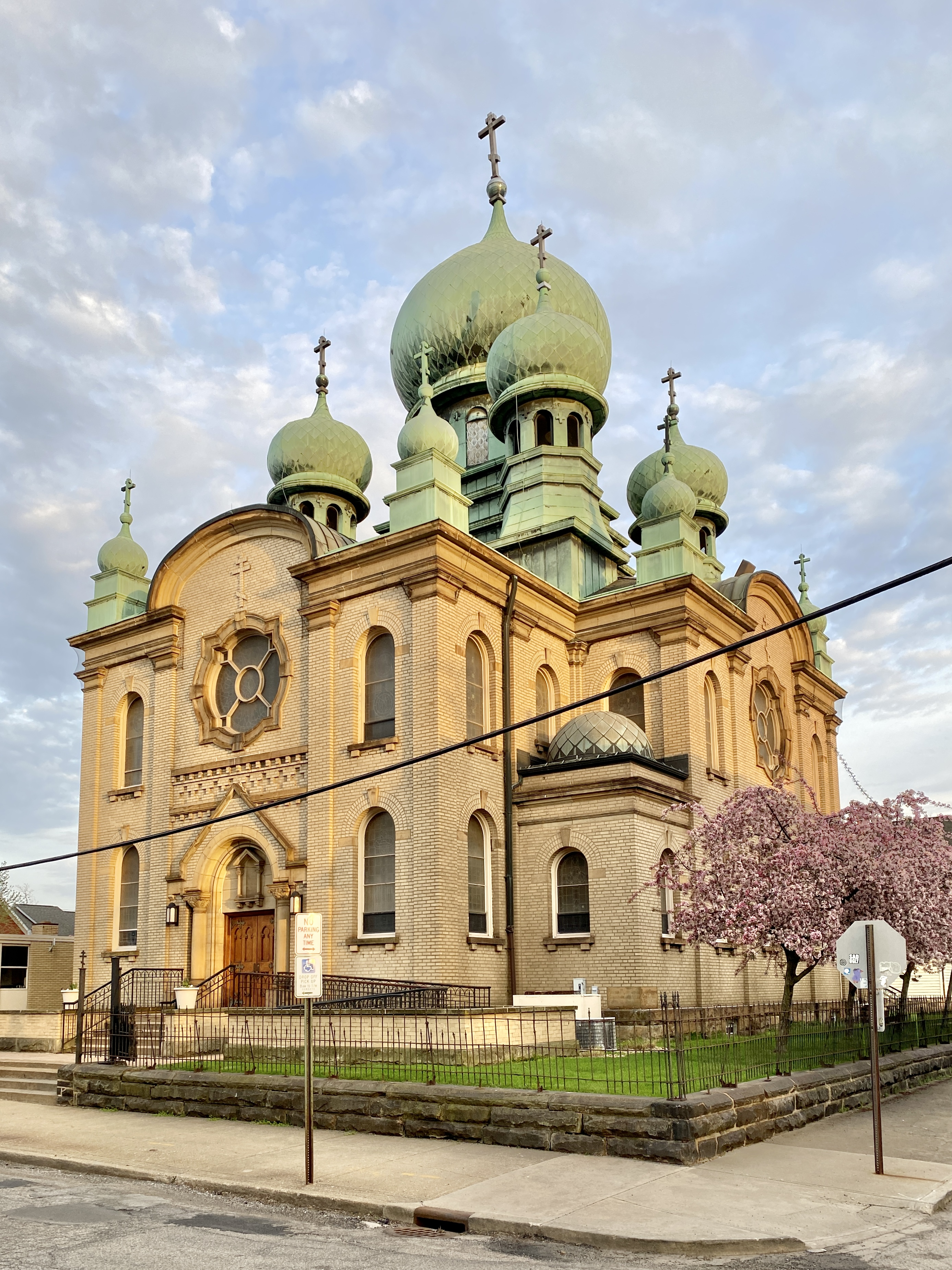
- St. Theodosius Russian Orthodox Cathedral, Cleveland, Ohio, USA
- St. Theodosius Orthodox Christian Cathedral
- 41°28′38″N 81°40′54″W
- Location: 733 Starkweather Ave., Cleveland, Ohio
- Country: United States
- Denomination: Eastern Orthodox
- Previous denomination: Russian Orthodox
- Churchmanship: Orthodox Church in America
- Website: www.sttheodosius.org

History
- Status: Cathedral
- Consecrated: 20 July 1913

Architecture
- Functional status: Active
- Architect: Frederick C. Baird
- Architectural type: Church
- Groundbreaking: 1911
- Construction cost: $70,000

U.S. National Register of Historic Places
- Official name: St. Theodosius Russian Orthodox Cathedral
- Designated: January 18, 1974
- Reference no.: 74001453

St. Theodosius Cathedral (Russian: Собор Святого Феодосия) is an Eastern Orthodox church located on Starkweather Avenue in the West Side neighborhood of Tremont in Cleveland, Ohio. Considered one of the finest examples of Russian church architecture in the United States, it is listed on the National Register of Historic Places. St. Theodosius was the first Eastern Orthodox parish in Cleveland and is currently under the jurisdiction of the Diocese of the Midwest of the Orthodox Church in America. The cathedral is perhaps best known for its appearance in the 1978 Best Picture-winning film, The Deer Hunter, with Robert De Niro, Christopher Walken, and Meryl Streep. It is also seen in the opening credits of Major League.

== Dedication ==
The cathedral is dedicated to the patron saint of St. Theodosius of Chernigov (in present-day Ukraine). Theodosius was born in the early 1630s in Podolia. The name given to him in baptism is unknown. Educated at the Brotherhood Monastery in Kiev, he became a monk at Kiev Pechersk Lavra and was named Theodosius, in honor of Theodosius of Kiev. He was later ordained as a celibate priest at the Saint Nicholas Krupytskyi Monastery near Baturyn. In 1662, he was appointed hegumen of the Korsun Monastery in Kaniv and in 1664, he was appointed hegumen of the Vydubychi Monastery in Kiev. He established a small skete on the island of Mikhailovschino or Mikhailovschina in 1680 and, in 1688, he was appointed archimandrite of the Yeletskyi Dormition Monastery in Chernigov. On September 13, 1692, he was consecrated archbishop in the Dormition Cathedral in the Moscow Kremlin. In 1694, a skete was founded near Liubech. Saint Theodosius died on February 5, 1696, and was buried in the Cathedral of Saints Boris and Gleb in Chernigov.

== History ==
The parish of St. Theodosius was organized in Cleveland in 1896 by Carpatho-Rusyn immigrants living in Tremont. The founders had emigrated from Carpathian Ruthenia in Austria-Hungary (now Zakarpattia Oblast in present-day Ukraine) when the tide of Eastern European immigration to the American urban centers of the Northeast and Midwest was at an all-time high. They were originally Ruthenian Greek Catholics (also known as Byzantine Catholics) who became dissatisfied by their affiliation with the Catholic Church and followed Carpatho-Rusyn church leader Alexis Toth into Russian Orthodoxy. This same situation played out in many Eastern Catholic parishes in the US, and the results formed the core group of the present Orthodox Church in America (OCA).

The first church structure was a light-frame construction building, at Literary Rd. and W. 6th St., built in 1896. The Russian Missionary Fund established by Tsar Nicholas II provided financial assistance. The second church structure was the former Sisters of St. Joseph Convent. (Note: This is named as "St. John's Convent" in several sources.) In 1902, the parish bought the former Sisters of St. Joseph Convent and sold 80 individual lots from the convent land to parishioners for $125 apiece to raise funds. The current cathedral is the parish's third church structure. It was completed at an estimated cost of $70,000. It was consecrated by Bishop Alexander (Nemolovsky) on Sunday, July 20, 1913.

In 1909 the parish purchased land in the Cleveland suburb of Brooklyn for a cemetery. The property had a wooden barn on it and one of the monks from St. Theodosius would come to the location on Saturdays to teach the Russian language to the children who lived too far away to attend Russian classes at the church.

Starting in 1917, the Russian Revolution and Civil War greatly impacted the Russian Empire and the Russian Orthodox Church. After the February Revolution, the Russian Provisional Government abolished the Most Holy Synod and allowed the church to restore the Patriarchate. The Most Holy Synod had administered all church property and controlled the expenditure of churches and monasteries. The Provisional Government was overthrown by the Bolsheviks in the October Revolution of 1917. Shortly afterwards, the church elected Tikhon of Moscow to be Patriarch of Moscow and all Rus'. The subsequent violence of the Russian Civil War devastated the church and the country. The Soviet government opposed the church, and many White émigrés came to Cleveland and joined St. Theodosius during this period. Longtime pastor Fr. Jason Kappanadze of Georgia was among them.

On February 25–28, 1919, the cathedral hosted the Second All-American Sobor which set a precedent, by electing Alexander (Nemolovsky) to the rank of Archbishop of the Aleutians and North America, for future elections of the Church's primates by later councils. This made him the first primate to be chosen locally in North America. The Russian Orthodox Church was weakened again and further dissociated in 1922, when the Living Church, a Soviet-supported movement, dismissed the Patriarch and restored a Synod to power.

On November 20–23, 1934, the cathedral hosted the Fifth All-American Sobor which elected primate Theophilus (Pashkovsky). On November 26–29, 1946, it hosted the Seventh All-American Sobor which broke ties between the Orthodox Church in America and Russian Orthodox Church Outside Russia. It was rededicated on October 3, 1954. Since the late 1950s, the clergy celebrated the liturgy in both Church Slavonic and English languages. Today there is only one Sunday liturgy and it is in English and parts in Slavonic.

On January 18, 1974, the building was placed on the National Register of Historic Places and was designated a Cleveland Landmark.

In the summer of 1977, St. Theodosius served as the site for the wedding scene in the film The Deer Hunter. According to the film credits, the parish's own Father Stephen Kopestonsky, was cast as the priest in the scene. On June 16, 1961, it also appeared in an episode of the TV series Route 66 ("Incident On a Bridge").

On May 28, 2024, the cathedral caught fire due to a roofing accident. As a result of the damage, the main dome was temporarily removed on June 1. The cathedral is currently in a process of restoration and repair.

== Architecture ==
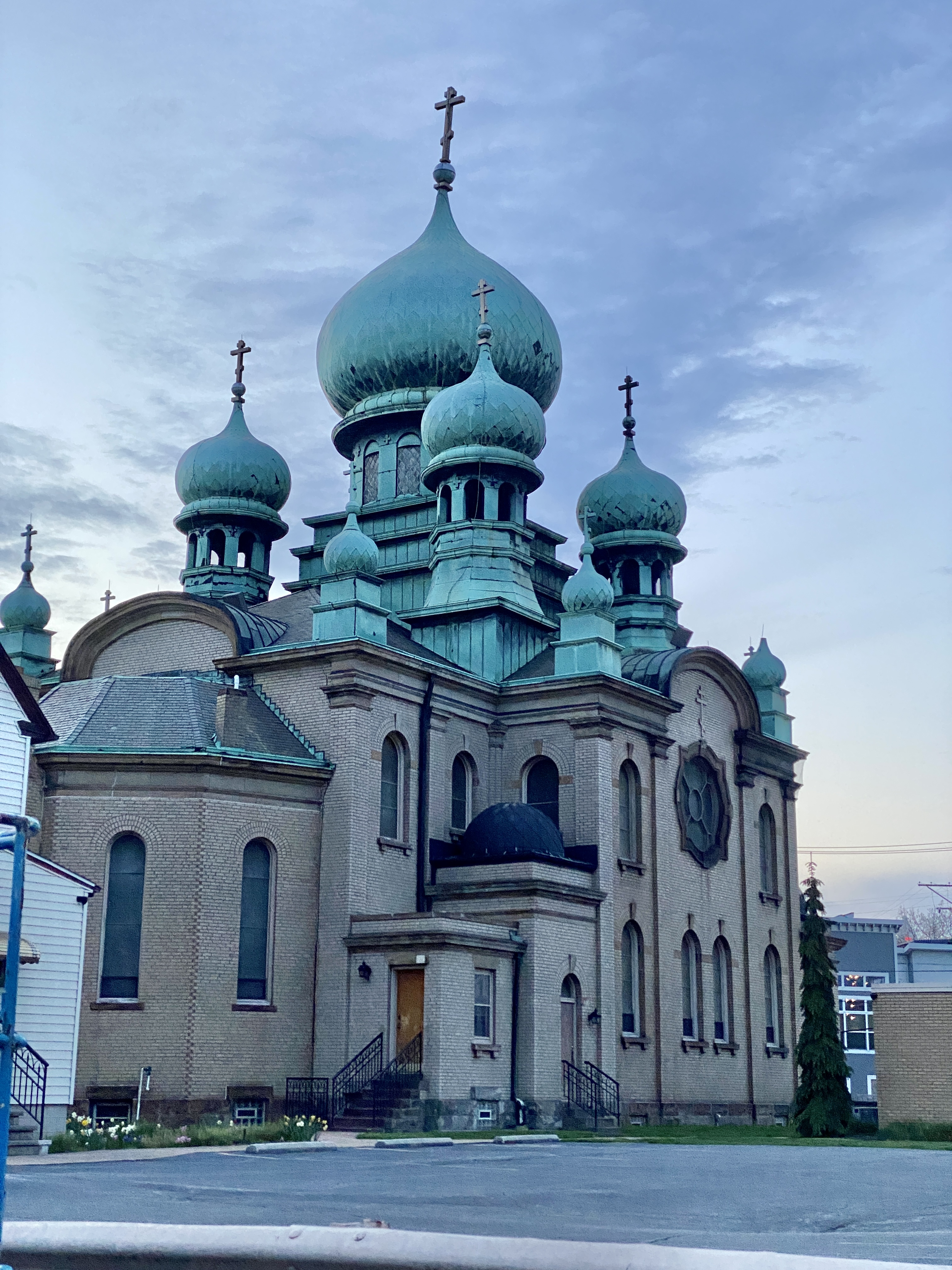
Another view of the cathedral

The cathedral was built in a recognizable Neo-Byzantine style; a type of Russian church architecture with one large, four medium, and eight small copper onion domes, symbolic of Christ and the twelve apostles. The cathedral is considered one of the best representatives of Russian church architecture in the U.S. with design features, by Cleveland architect Frederick C. Baird, based on photographs of the original Cathedral of Christ the Saviour in Moscow, Russia.

The iconostasis, separating the sanctuary from the larger portion of the cathedral accessible to the faithful, contains the following icons imported from Russia:

above – Crucifix with the Blessed Virgin Mary and John the Baptist;
top tier – the Twelve Apostles to either side of an icon depicting the Holy Trinity;
middle tier of smaller icons – various saints to either side of an icon depicting the Last Supper over the Royal Doors;
bottom tier (left to right) – Saint Nicholas, Archangel Michael, Mother of God, the Royal Doors, the Savior, Archangel Gabriel, Saint Theodosius of Chernigov.

In 1953, the church commissioned murals by noted Russian émigré fresco painter Andrej Bicenko. Included in one of the murals is the likeness of one of the cathedral's most prominent pastors, Fr. Jason Kappanadze.

== Leadership ==
#	Priest	Tenure
1	John Nedzelnitsky	1896
2	Victor Stepanov	1897–1902
3	Jason R. Kappanadze	1902–1908
4	Vasily Vasilyev	1908
5	John Chepeleff	1909
6	Basil S. Lisenkovsky	1910–1921
7	K. Karpenko	1915
8	Arkady Petrovsky	1915
9	Basil Rubinsky	1915
10	Alexander Kukulevsky	1921
11	Jason R. Kappanadze	1922–1957
12	Peter Bogusz	1958
13	Igor Tkachuk	1959–1963
14	Sergei Kuharsky	1964–1976
15	Stephen Kopestonsky	1976–1987
16	Jason Cupp	1988
17	Jason R. Kappanadze	1988–1999
18	John E. Zdinak	1999–2020
19	Ján Čižmár	2021–Present
