= The Boys of Twilight =

- Genre: Western
- Created by: William Blinn
- Starring: Wilfred Brimley; Richard Farnsworth; Ben Browder
- Composers: Steve Bramson; Joel McNeely
- Country of origin: United States
- Original language: English
- No. of seasons: 1
- No. of episodes: 5 (1 unaired)

Production
- Executive producer: William Blinn
- Running time: 60 minutes
- Production companies: Echo Cove Productions; TriStar Television

Original release
- Network: CBS
- Release: February 29 – March 21, 1992

The Boys of Twilight is an American Western drama series that aired on CBS from February 29 until March 21, 1992.

== Plot ==
Set in Twilight, Utah, the series centered around aging Sheriff Cody McPherson (Farnsworth) and his Deputy Bill Huntoon (Brimley), who struggle with the influx of upwardly mobile professionals and city crime into their small town.

== Cast ==
- Richard Farnsworth as Sheriff Cody McPherson
- Wilfred Brimley as Deputy Bill Huntoon
- Ben Browder as Tyler Clare
- Louise Fletcher as Genelva McPherson
- Amanda McBroom as Suzanne Troxell

== Production ==
Parts of the series were shot in Park City, Utah.

== Episodes ==
No.	Title	Directed by	Written by	Original release date
1	"Shadow of a Shadow"	Ray Austin	William Blinn	February 29, 1992
2	"Hand Grenades and Horseshoes"	Unknown	Unknown	March 7, 1992
3	"A Bend in the River"	Bill Norton, Jr.	Christopher Beaumount	March 14, 1992
4	"The Road Back"	Unknown	Unknown	March 21, 1992
5	"A Wing and a Prayer"	TBD	TBD	Unaired
