= Yanks =

1979 film by John Schlesinger

- Theatrical release poster
- Directed by: John Schlesinger
- Screenplay by: Colin Welland; Walter Bernstein
- Story by: Colin Welland
- Produced by: Joseph Janni; Lester Persky
- Starring: Richard Gere; Lisa Eichhorn; Vanessa Redgrave; William Devane; Chick Vennera; Wendy Morgan; Rachel Roberts; Tony Melody
- Cinematography: Dick Bush
- Edited by: Jim Clark
- Music by: Richard Rodney Bennett
- Production company: United Artists; CIP Filmproduktion
- Distributed by: Universal Pictures (US); United Artists (International)
- Release dates: 1 July 1979 (Bournemouth, premiere); 19 September 1979 (UK & US)
- Running time: 141 minutes
- Countries: United Kingdom; United States; West Germany
- Language: English
- Budget: $6 million
- Box office: $4 million

Yanks is a 1979 romantic war drama film directed by John Schlesinger, from a screenplay by Colin Welland and Walter Bernstein. It stars Richard Gere, Lisa Eichhorn (in her film debut), Vanessa Redgrave, William Devane, and Rachel Roberts. The film is set on the home front during the Second World War in Northern England, and features no combat scenes.

The film depicts the relationships between American soldiers stationed in semi-rural England and the local population during the build-up to Operation Overlord in 1944. In particular, three romances between US service personnel and local women are shown, in order to explore the effects of the cultural differences between the brash GIs or "Yanks" and the more reserved British population.

Yanks was an international co-production between the United Kingdom, West Germany, and the United States. At the 33rd British Academy Film Awards, the film was nominated in seven categories including Best Direction, and won for Best Actress in a Supporting Role (for Rachel Roberts) and Best Costume Design. Lisa Eichhorn was nominated for two Golden Globes, New Star of the Year – Actress and Best Actress in a Motion Picture – Drama.

== Plot ==
During the Second World War, a small town in Northern England greets a large influx of rambunctious American troops when a U.S. Army base is established nearby in support of the upcoming Normandy landings. Among the "Yanks" (as the British locals call them), are Sergeant Danny Ruffelo and Technical Sergeant Matt Dyson. They flirt with Mollie, a bus attendant, when taking the bus into town for their first leave. Danny and Matt arragne to meet Mollie at the cinema. Mollie's friend Jean Moreton is frustrated Mollie didn't tell her about the soldiers; she has a strict mother and the residents of the small town know she's engaged to Ken, a British soldier fighting overseas. She rebuffs Matt's overtures but warms to his persistence. Matt talks of his life in Arizona as a short order cook with plans to build motels. A friendship builds and they go cycling through the countryside, attend dances and have friendly Sunday lunches together. She wins over her mother, comparing him positively with other G.I.s who crudely make offensive remarks, and touch the local women inappropriately.

Helen is a middle aged, upper class woman with two children, a stately home and a deployed husband. Her war duties include greeting newly arrived US soldiers with tea and doughnuts. She plays in the local orchestra and becomes friendly with an American Captain, John, who drops by to borrow library books, accompany her to concerts and play golf with her friends. Their relationship becomes physical as bad news abour their spouses arrives. John's wife unexpectedly sells their home and moves back with her family, and Helen's contact with her husband stops.

Matt is accepted by the Moreton family. As an army cook, he often brings hard-to-find foods normally on wartime rationing. When news of Ken's death in action arrives, their openly romantic relationship is condemned by Jean's ailing mother as a betrayal. Jean and Matt travel together to a Welsh seaside resort, but Matt is unable to consummate the relationship, blaming their uncertainty future. Jean is upset that her willingness to risk life and reputation hasn't been matched by the same level of commitment on his part. She concludes he isn't ready for her. When their friends Mollie and Danny marry, Jean confronts Matt, who explains his lack of commitment on the unexpected speed of their relationship and the uncertain future.

On the day of the funeral for Jean's mother, the Americans ship out by troop train to Southern England to stage for D-Day. A last-minute gift from Matt prompts Jean, at her father's urging, to race to the railway station, where a pregnant Mollie is already fighting through the crowds to say goodbye to Danny. Helen shares a resigned farewell with John; he returns her library books at concert practice, tells her his wife is divorcing him, and Helen admits her husband is due home that week for leave. They part with a brief kiss.

The film ends with the crowded train station. Hundreds of the townswomen, some of them pregnant from liaisons with men they may never see again, scramble to catch one last glimpse of their American boyfriends before the train leaves. Matt shouts from the departing train that he will return.

== Cast ==
- Richard Gere as Technical Sergeant Matt Dyson
- Lisa Eichhorn as Jean Moreton
- Vanessa Redgrave as Helen
- William Devane as John
- Chick Vennera as Sergeant Danny Ruffelo
- Wendy Morgan as Mollie
- Rachel Roberts as Clarrie Moreton
- Tony Melody as Jim Moreton
- Martin Smith as Geoff Moreton
- Philip Wileman as Billy Rathbone
- Derek Thompson as Ken
- Simon Harrison as Tim
- Joan Hickson as Mrs Moody
- Arlen Dean Snyder as Henry
- Annie Ross as Red Cross Lady
- June Ellis as Mrs Shenton
- Lynne Carol as Annie
- Pearl Hackney as Aunt Maud
- Paul Luty as Ted
- Helen Palmer as Enid
- Kenneth Drury as Jock
- John Ratzenberger as G.I. Messman
- Antony Sher as G.I. at Cinema
- George Harris as Black Driver
- Everett McGill as White G.I. at Dance
- Al Matthews as Black G.I. at Dance
- Eugene Lipinski as Barman in Ireland
- Paula Tilbrook as Neighbour

== Production ==
=== Writing ===
The script drew upon the experiences of writers Walter Bernstein and Colin Welland, and director John Schlesinger, during the Second World War. Bernstein was a Sergeant in the US Army who worked as a correspondent for Yank. Schlesinger was a Private in the Royal Engineers. Welland was a young boy in Liverpool, which saw him regularly interact with visiting American servicemen. Welland researched the impact of American servicemen in Northern England and placed advertisements in local newspapers, which led to finding “a charming account” about a British woman and an American serviceman.

Schlesinger was able to obtain the finance to make Yanks - which was a personal project - because of the financial success of Marathon Man (1976).

=== Casting ===
Before Richard Gere was cast, Jeff Bridges, Roy Scheider and George Segal were offered the role of Matt.

Olivia Newton-John was considered for the role of Jean. Lisa Eichhorn, a relatively-unknown stage actress, won the role after auditioning for Schlesinger by pretending to be British. Eichhorn was in fact American, and had moved to England to study at Oxford and RADA. She only told Schlesinger she was American after she had already been cast.

=== Filming ===
Much of the filming took place on location in Northern England between April and August 1978. Scenes were shot on location in Oldham, Glossop, Stalybridge, Stockport, Salford and other surrounding areas. The opening shot of the film is the war memorial in Stalybridge town centre. Other scenes were filmed at the town hall in Hyde and outside a Type 24 pillbox attached to a former Royal Ordnance Factory in Steeton, West Yorkshire. The main street procession was filmed in the Ordsall area of Salford, where the entire length of Regent Road was redressed to period appearance. All the shop fronts were replaced or covered over and the road-lines were covered by gravel. The cinema sequences were shot at the Davenport Theatre / Cinema, in Stockport. This was chosen because of its authentic, period Art Deco interior, as well as the presence, in the orchestra pit, of a Compton 3 Manual/6 Rank theatre organ on a lift to the left of the stage. This was used in the film for scenes involving an audience sing-along, to such songs as "Praise the Lord and Pass the Ammunition" and "Deep in the Heart of Texas," Exterior shots of the unnamed Welsh resort were filmed along Happy Valley Road, Llandudno, North Wales.

The ending, where the troops board their train to head to the front, were filmed at Keighley railway station on the line belonging to the Keighley and Worth Valley Railway. An authentic Second World War locomotive, which is preserved by the heritage railway, was used for the scene.

Lisa Eichhorn said one of her most difficult scenes in the film was where she offers herself to her boyfriend, Matt, only to be rejected. "The difficult part was dealing with the nudity in that scene," she said. "I'd never done any on the stage, and didn't think I'd have to do it in my first movie. I didn't want to get the reputation of an actress who easily disrobes".

== Release ==
The world premiere was held on 1 June 1979 at a cinema in Bournemouth, England. Lisa Eichhorn was present at the premiere, which had invited returning D-Day veterans from many American divisions - most notably the American 29th Division. Leader of the returning 29ers was Sgt Curtis C. Williams who was 19 on D-Day.

== Reception ==
=== Box office ===
The film was a box office flop in the US only making $1.6 million in rentals.

=== Critical response ===
The film received mixed-to-positive reviews. On Rotten Tomatoes it has an approval rating of 57% based on reviews from 21 critics. Metacritic, which uses a weighted average, assigned the film a score of 54 out of 100, based on 8 critics, indicating "mixed or average" reviews.

A review in Variety said "Director John Schlesinger has done a beautiful job with both cast and craft in Yanks, a multiple love story set in England in World War II. Yet little that's exciting ever happens in the picture.

In a positive review, Rex Reed of The Village Voice wrote "In every decade, a truly memorable motion picture comes along that, sometimes, if we're lucky, can enrich our lives. Yanks will be the one from the 1970s that future audiences and historians will remember, and cherish." Gary Arnold of The Washington Post called it "an unusually appealing and ingratiating movie." David Thomson of Sight and Sound wrote "Yanks is so much better than I expected that I hope I don't overrate it." Sue Heal of the Radio Times wrote "This pleasing effort from director John Schlesinger glows with a homely period charm, but never descends into sentimentality." Richard Corliss wrote for Maclean's, "Yanks, a tribute to sentimental war movies as much as to the camaraderie of war, concentrates on murmurs of the middle-class heart. And in its soft-spoken fidelity to the domestic emotions, it is indeed gorgeous."

Conversely, Vincent Canby of The New York Times wrote in a negative review "It's soft, sort of spongy and so bland that you may well remember the scenery better than anything that happens in front of it."

The National Board of Review ranked it in the Top Ten Films of 1979.

=== Awards and nominations ===
Award	Year	Category	Nominee	Result
British Academy Film Awards	1980	Best Direction	John Schlesinger	Nominated
British Academy Film Awards	1980	Best Screenplay	Colin Welland, Walter Bernstein	Nominated
British Academy Film Awards	1980	Best Actress in a Supporting Role	Rachel Roberts	Won
British Academy Film Awards	1980	Best Original Music	Richard Rodney Bennett	Nominated
British Academy Film Awards	1980	Best Cinematography	Dick Bush	Nominated
British Academy Film Awards	1980	Best Production Design	Brian Morris	Nominated
British Academy Film Awards	1980	Best Costume Design	Shirley Ann Russell	Won
David di Donatello	1980	European David	John Schlesinger	Won
Evening Standard British Film Award	1981	Best Film	John Schlesinger	Won
Golden Globe	1980	Best Actress in a Motion Picture – Drama	Lisa Eichhorn	Nominated
Golden Globe	1980	New Star of the Year – Actress	Lisa Eichhorn	Nominated
National Board of Review Award	1979	Top Ten Films		Won
National Board of Review Award	1979	Best Director	John Schlesinger	Won
