= The Deer Hunter =

1978 film directed by Michael Cimino

- International theatrical release poster
- Directed by: Michael Cimino
- Screenplay by: Deric Washburn; Michael Cimino (uncredited)
- Story by: Deric Washburn; Michael Cimino; Louis A. Garfinkle; Quinn K. Redeker
- Produced by: Barry Spikings; Michael Deeley; Michael Cimino; John Peverall
- Starring: Robert De Niro; John Cazale; John Savage; Meryl Streep; Christopher Walken
- Cinematography: Vilmos Zsigmond
- Edited by: Peter Zinner; Michael Cimino (uncredited)
- Music by: Stanley Myers
- Production company: EMI Films
- Distributed by: Universal Pictures
- Release dates: December 8, 1978 (Los Angeles); February 23, 1979 (United States)
- Running time: 184 minutes
- Country: United States
- Languages: English; Russian; Vietnamese; French
- Budget: $15 million
- Box office: $49 million

The Deer Hunter is a 1978 American epic war drama film co-written and directed by Michael Cimino about a trio of Russian-American steelworkers (inspired by Cimino's real-life Belarusian-American friend) whose lives are upended by fighting in the Vietnam War. The soldiers are played by Robert De Niro, Christopher Walken and John Savage, with John Cazale (in his final role), Meryl Streep, and George Dzundza in supporting roles. The story takes place in Clairton, Pennsylvania (a working-class town on the Monongahela River south of Pittsburgh) and in Vietnam.

The film is based in part on an unproduced screenplay called The Man Who Came to Play by Louis A. Garfinkle and Quinn K. Redeker about Las Vegas and Russian roulette. Producer Michael Deeley, who bought the script, hired Cimino, who, with Deric Washburn, rewrote the script, taking the Russian roulette element and placing it in the Vietnam War. The film went over budget and over schedule, costing $15 million. Its production company EMI Films released it in other territories, while Universal Pictures handled its distribution in the United States and Canada.

The Deer Hunter received acclaim from critics and audiences, with praise for Cimino's direction, the performances of its cast, its screenplay, realistic themes and tones, and cinematography. It was also successful at the box office, grossing $49 million. At the 51st Academy Awards, it was nominated for nine Academy Awards, and won five: Best Picture, Best Director (for Cimino), Best Supporting Actor (for Walken), Best Sound, and Best Film Editing. It is Meryl Streep's first Academy Award nomination (for Best Supporting Actress).

The Deer Hunter has been included on lists of the best films ever made, including being named the 53rd-greatest American film of all time by the American Film Institute in 2007 in their 10th Anniversary Edition of the AFI's 100 Years...100 Movies list. In 1996, it was selected for preservation in the United States National Film Registry by the Library of Congress, as being "culturally, historically, or aesthetically significant".

== Plot ==
Three Russian-American (Note: While film critics and viewers long debated the characters' precise ethnic affiliation (identifying them variously as Russian Americans, Ukrainian Americans, Rusyn Americans, etc.), director Michael Cimino later stated that the characters and the wedding scene were based on his real-life best friend, a "White Russian" (Belarusian-American) named Nikanor Chebotarevich.) friends in Clairton, Pennsylvania—Mike, Steven, and Nick—work in a steel mill and hunt deer with co-workers Stan and Axel, and bartender friend John. Mike, Steven, and Nick have enlisted for the Vietnam War. Steven is marrying Angela, pregnant by another man. The stoic Mike and amiable Nick are close friends and roommates; Nick dates Linda, with whom Mike is secretly infatuated. With Mike's approval, Nick allows Linda to stay in their house while they are away to escape her abusive alcoholic father. After catching the bouquet at Steven and Angela's wedding at a veterans hall, Linda accepts Nick's spontaneous marriage proposal. At the bar, Mike, Steven, and Nick meet a traumatized Green Beret, who curtly dismisses their attempt to ask about Vietnam. Later, Nick implores Mike to promise never to leave him stranded in Vietnam. The next day, the friends go on a final hunting trip; Mike kills a deer with "one shot," a goal they all aspire to achieve.

In Vietnam, Mike, now a Green Beret, coincidentally crosses paths with Nick and Steven, who land in a village during an air assault mission. Imprisoned by the Viet Cong, the three are forced to participate in Russian roulette while the jailers wager. Firing his round into the ceiling, Steven is forced into a submerged cage in the river with rats and previous victims. During Mike and Nick's turn to play, Mike convinces the captors to increase the stakes by loading three bullets into the revolver rather than one. When the next two chambers fall on empty, Mike and Nick turn their guns on their captors, killing them. Although Nick is wounded in the leg, they rescue Steven and escape.

The trio floats down the river on a felled tree trunk, but Nick and Steven quickly grow weak from their wounds. They are found by an American helicopter, which Nick boards. Steven falls back into the river while trying to hold onto the helicopter skids, breaking both legs. Dropping back down to help Steven, Mike carries him until meeting up with a South Vietnamese Army convoy.

In Saigon, Nick is treated at a U.S. military hospital. When released, suffering from PTSD, Nick wanders into a gambling den where bettors are wagering on Russian roulette. French businessman Julien forces him to come inside. Upset, Nick interrupts the game, pulling the trigger on a player, then himself, and then assaulting the bouncer. Coincidentally a spectator, Mike is unsuccessful in reaching Nick, who hurriedly is taken away by Julien, who bankrolls Nick in future games.

Returning home, Mike remains traumatized and avoids Linda's welcome-home party with friends, opting to stay in a hotel instead. Seeing Linda the next day, he learns that Nick has deserted and Angela has slipped into near-catatonia following her child's birth and Steven's return. On a hunting trip with his friends, Mike loses interest in shooting a deer and returns to the cabin, finding Stan cavalierly threatening Axel with a pistol. Mike takes the pistol, inserts a single round, and triggers an empty chamber at Stan's head.

Finding consolation in their mutual grief over Nick's disappearance, Mike and Linda begin a sexual relationship. Mike visits Steven at the veterans' hospital, finding that both his legs and one arm have been amputated and he is refusing to go home. Steven shows Mike that he has been regularly receiving large sums of cash from Saigon. Realizing that Nick is the source of these payments, Mike forces Steven to return to Angela.

Mike returns to Saigon, now in chaos shortly before its fall, to find Nick. He locates and persuades Julien to take him to another gambling den where a drug-addled Nick has become a high-stakes pawn in Russian roulette and fails to recognize Mike. Mike attempts to bring Nick back to reason, but Nick remains unresponsive, spitting in Mike's face. Resorting to entering in a game with Nick, Mike describes their hunting trips; Nick recalls Mike's "one shot" mantra about the deer and smiles before pulling the trigger, killing himself.

Mike, Steven, friends, and loved ones attend Nick's funeral. As they convene at the bar for breakfast, John begins to sing "God Bless America" and all join in.

== Cast ==
- Robert De Niro as Staff Sergeant Mikhail Vronsky ("Mike"). After Roy Scheider withdrew from the cast two weeks before the start of filming due to creative differences, producer Michael Deeley pursued De Niro, who was paid one million dollars for the role, in search of star power to sell a film with a "gruesome-sounding storyline and a barely known director". De Niro later said, "I liked the script, and [Cimino] had done a lot of prep. I was impressed." He prepared by socializing with steelworkers in local bars and by visiting their homes. De Niro claimed that this was his most physically exhausting film, and that the sequence in which Mike visits Steven in the hospital was the most emotional scene of his career.
- Christopher Walken as Corporal Nikanor Chevotarevich ("Nick"). The character was named after director Michael Cimino's real-life best friend and college roommate, Nikanor Chebotarevich, whom Cimino described as a "White Russian". Historical records indicate Chebotarevich was born in Belarus and emigrated to the United States during World War II. His performance won an Academy Award for Best Supporting Actor.
- John Savage as Corporal Steven Pushkov.
- John Cazale as Stanley ("Stan"/"Stosh"). All scenes involving Cazale, who had terminal cancer, were filmed first. Because of his illness, the studio wanted to dismiss him, but Streep, with whom he was in a romantic relationship, and Cimino threatened to withdraw from the project if Cazale was released. He was almost uninsurable, and according to Streep, De Niro paid for his insurance because he wanted Cazale in the film. This was Cazale's last film, as he died shortly after filming wrapped. He never saw the finished film.
- Meryl Streep as Linda. In the screenplay, Streep's role was negligible, but Cimino explained the role to her and suggested that she write her own lines.
- George Dzundza as John Welsh.
- Pierre Segui as Julien Grinda.
- Shirley Stoler as Steven's mother.
- Chuck Aspegren as Peter Axelrod ("Axel"). Aspegren was not an actor; he was the foreman at an East Chicago steel factory that was visited by De Niro and Cimino during pre-production. They were so impressed with him that they offered him the role. He was the second person to be cast in the film, after De Niro.
- Rutanya Alda as Angela Ludhjduravic-Pushkov.
- Paul D'Amato as Sergeant.
- Amy Wright as Bridesmaid.
- Joe Grifasi as Bandleader.
- John F. Buchmelter III as a bar patron. Buchmelter was a steel worker whom Cimino wanted to lend the film a sense of authenticity.
- John McBeth as a bar patron and a Marine.
- Somsak Sengvilai as the Viet Cong referee. Casting local actors to play the stone-faced referee during the famous Russian-roulette scene proved troublesome, as many refused to authentically slap De Niro and Walken. When Sengvilai was cast, he was noted as holding a particular disdain toward Americans, and the slaps that he delivered in the scene were genuine.

Although Deeley was pleased with the revised script, he was still concerned with selling the film. He later wrote, "We still had to get millions out of a major studio, as well as convince our markets around the world that they should buy it before it was finished. I needed someone with the caliber of Robert De Niro." Deeley felt that De Niro was "the right age, apparently tough as hell, and immensely talented".

De Niro, who knew many actors in New York, brought Streep and Cazale to the attention of Cimino and Deeley. De Niro also accompanied Cimino to scout locations for the steel-mill sequence, and rehearsed with the actors to use the workshops as a bonding process.

Each of the six principal male characters carried a photo in his back pocket depicting them all together as children to enhance the sense of camaraderie among them. Cimino instructed the props department to fashion complete photo IDs for each of them, including driver licenses and medical cards, to enhance each actor's sense of his character.

== Production ==
=== Preproduction ===
There has been considerable debate and controversy about how The Deer Hunter was initially developed and written. Director and cowriter Michael Cimino, writer Deric Washburn and producers Barry Spikings and Michael Deeley all have different versions of how the film came to be.

==== Development ====
In 1968, record company EMI formed a new company, EMI Films, which by the mid 70s came under the control of Barry Spikings and Deeley. Deeley purchased the first draft of a spec script called The Man Who Came to Play, written by Louis A. Garfinkle and Quinn K. Redeker, for $19,000. It was about people who go to Las Vegas to play Russian roulette. Deeley later wrote, "The screenplay had struck me as brilliant, but it wasn't complete. The trick was to find a way to turn a very clever piece of writing into a practical, realizable film." When the film was being planned during the mid-1970s, the Vietnam War was still a taboo subject with all major Hollywood studios. According to Deeley, the standard response was that "no American would want to see a picture about Vietnam".

After consulting with various Hollywood agents, Deeley found Cimino and was impressed by Cimino's television commercial work and his crime film Thunderbolt and Lightfoot (1974). Cimino was confident that he could further develop the principal characters of The Man Who Came to Play without losing the essence of the original. According to Deeley, Cimino questioned the need for the Russian-roulette element of the script, but Redeker fervently fought to preserve it. Cimino and Deeley discussed the work that would be needed in the first part of the script, and Cimino believed that he could develop the stories of the main characters in the film's first twenty minutes.

==== Screenplay ====
Cimino worked for six weeks with Deric Washburn on the script. Cimino and Washburn had previously collaborated with Steven Bochco on the screenplay for Silent Running (1972). According to producer Barry Spikings, Cimino said that he wanted to work with Washburn again. According to Deeley, he heard from an office rumor that Washburn was contracted by Cimino to work on the script. "Whether Cimino hired Washburn as his sub-contractor or as a co-writer was constantly being obfuscated," wrote Deeley, "and there were some harsh words between them later on, or so I was told."

Cimino's claim

According to Cimino, he called Washburn while on the road scouting for locations and fed him notes on dialogue and story. After reviewing Washburn's draft, Cimino said, "I came back and read it and I just could not believe what I read. It was like it was written by somebody who was... mentally deranged." Cimino confronted Washburn at the Sunset Marquis in LA about the draft, and Washburn supposedly replied that he could not take the pressure and had to go home. So Cimino fired Washburn. Cimino later claimed to have written the entire screenplay. Washburn's response to Cimino's claim was, "It's all nonsense. It's lies. I didn't have a single drink the entire time I was working on the script."

Washburn's claim

According to Washburn, he and Cimino spent three days together in Los Angeles at the Sunset Marquis hammering out the plot. The script eventually went through several drafts, evolving into a story with three distinct acts. Washburn did not interview any veterans to write The Deer Hunter, nor did he conduct any research. "I had a month, that was it," he explained. "The clock was ticking. Write the fucking script! But all I had to do was watch TV. Those combat cameramen in Vietnam were out there in the field with the guys. I mean, they had stuff that you wouldn't dream of seeing about Iraq."

When Washburn was finished, he says, Cimino and Joann Carelli, the latter an associate producer on The Deer Hunter who went on to produce two more of Cimino's films, took him to dinner at a cheap restaurant near the Sunset Strip. He recalled, "We finished, and Joann looks at me across the table, and she says, 'Well, Deric, it's fuck-off time.' I was fired. It was a classic case: you get a dummy, get him to write the goddamn thing, tell him to go fuck himself, put your name on the thing, and he'll go away. I was so tired, I didn't care. I'd been working 20 hours a day for a month. I got on the plane the next day, and I went back to Manhattan and my carpenter job."

Deeley's reaction to the revised script

Deeley felt that the revised script, now called The Deer Hunter, broke fresh ground for the project. The protagonist in the Redeker/Garfinkle script, Merle, was an individual who sustained a bad injury in active service and was damaged psychologically by his violent experiences, but was nevertheless a tough character with strong nerves and guts. Cimino and Washburn's revised script distilled the three aspects of Merle's personality and separated them into three distinct characters. They became three old friends who grew up in the same small industrial town and worked in the same steel mill, and in due course, were drafted to serve in Vietnam. In the original script, the roles of Merle (later renamed Mike) and Nick were reversed in the last half of the film. Nick returns home to Linda, while Mike remains in Vietnam, sends money home to help Steven, and meets his tragic fate at the Russian-roulette table.

A Writers' Guild arbitration process awarded Washburn sole "Screenplay by" credit. Garfinkle and Redeker were given a shared "Story by" credit with Cimino and Washburn. Deeley felt that the story credits for Garfinkle and Redeker "did them less than justice". Cimino contested the results of the arbitration. "In their Nazi wisdom," added Cimino, "[they] didn't give me the credit because I would be producer, director and writer." All four writers—Cimino, Washburn, Garfinkle and Redeker—received an Oscar nomination for Best Original Screenplay for the film.

=== Filming ===
The Deer Hunter began principal photography on June 20, 1977. It was the first feature film depicting the Vietnam War to be filmed in Thailand. All scenes were shot on location. "There was discussion about shooting the film on a backlot, but the material demanded more realism," says Spikings. The cast and crew watched large amounts of news footage from the war to ensure authenticity. The film was shot in six months. The scenes of Clairton, Pennsylvania, comprise footage that was shot in eight towns in three states: West Virginia, Pennsylvania and Ohio. The film's initial budget was $8.5 million.

Meryl Streep accepted the role of the "vague, stock girlfriend" to remain for the duration of filming with John Cazale, who had been diagnosed with lung cancer. De Niro had spotted Streep in the stage production of The Cherry Orchard and suggested that she play his girlfriend Linda. Meryl Streep wrote all of her lines. Streep is said to have accepted the role to primarily be with Cazale.

Before the beginning of principal photography, Deeley met with the film's appointed line producer Robert Relyea, whom Deeley hired after meeting him on the set of Bullitt (1968) and being impressed with his experience. However, Relyea declined the job, refusing to disclose his reason. Deeley suspected that Relyea sensed in director Cimino something that would have made production difficult. As a result, Cimino was acting without the day-to-day supervision of a producer.

Because Deeley was busy overseeing the production of Sam Peckinpah's Convoy (1978), he hired John Peverall to oversee Cimino's shoot. Peverall's expertise with budgeting and scheduling made him a natural successor to Relyea, and Peverall knew enough about the picture to be elevated to the status of producer. "John is a straightforward Cornishman who had worked his way up to become a production supervisor," wrote Deeley, "and we employed him as EMI's watchman on certain pictures."

==== The wedding scenes ====
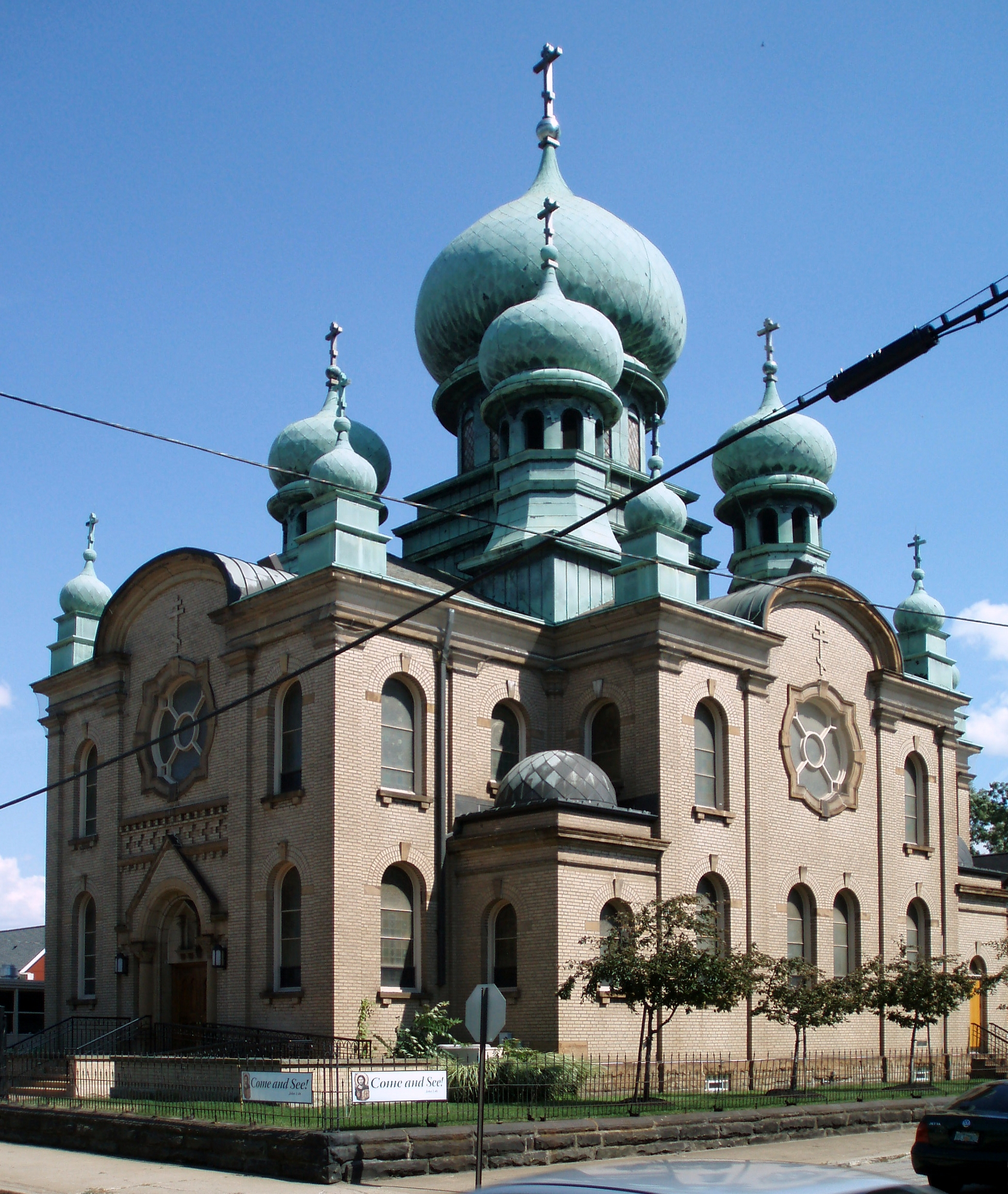
St. Theodosius Russian Orthodox Cathedral in Cleveland, Ohio, the site of the wedding scenes

The wedding scenes were filmed at historic St. Theodosius Russian Orthodox Cathedral in the Tremont neighborhood of Cleveland, Ohio. They took five days to film. St. Theodosius's Father Stephen Kopestonsky was cast as the priest. The reception scene was filmed at nearby Lemko Association Hall. The amateur extras cast for the crowded wedding-dance sequences drank real liquor and beer. The scenes were filmed in the summer, in 95 °F (35 °C) weather, but were set in the fall. To accomplish a fall look, individual leaves were removed from deciduous trees. Vilmos Zsigmond also had to desaturate the colors of the exterior shots, partly in camera and partly in laboratory processing.

The production manager asked each of the extras who were portraying Russian immigrants to bring to the location a gift-wrapped box to double for wedding presents. The manager figured that if the extras did this, not only would the production save time and money, but the gifts would look more authentic. After the unit unwrapped and the extras disappeared, the crew discovered to their amusement that the boxes were not empty but filled with real presents, from china to silverware. "Who got to keep all these wonderful offerings," wrote Deeley, "is a mystery I never quite fathomed."

Cimino originally claimed that the wedding scene took up 21 minutes of screen time; in the end, it took 51 minutes. Deeley believes that Cimino always planned to make this prologue last for an hour, and that "the plan was to be advanced by stealth rather than straight dealing".

At this point in the production, nearly halfway through principal photography, Cimino was already over budget, and producer Spikings could tell from the script that shooting the extended scene could sink the project.

==== The bar and the steel mill ====
The bar was specially constructed in an empty storefront in Mingo Junction, Ohio, for $25,000; it soon became an actual saloon for local steel-mill workers. U.S. Steel allowed filming inside its Cleveland mill, including placing the actors around the furnace floor, after securing a $5 million insurance policy. Other filming took place in Pittsburgh.

==== Hunting the deer ====
The first deer to be shot was depicted in a "gruesome close-up", although it was hit with only a tranquilizer dart. This was not a white-tailed buck, which is native to Pennsylvania, but a red deer native to Eurasia. The stag that Michael lets escape is the same as the one used on TV commercials for The Hartford.

==== Vietnam and the Russian roulette scenes ====
The Viet Cong Russian-roulette scenes were shot with real rats and mosquitoes, as the three principals (De Niro, Walken, and Savage) were tied up in bamboo cages erected along the River Kwai. The woman who was given the task of casting extras in Thailand had much difficulty finding a local to play the vicious-looking individual who runs the game. The first hired actor was incapable of slapping De Niro in the face. The casting agent found a local Thai man, Somsak Sengvilai, who held a particular dislike of Americans, and so he was cast. De Niro suggested that Walken be slapped by one of the guards without any warning, and Walken's reaction was genuine. Producer Deeley has said that Cimino shot the brutal Viet Cong Russian-roulette scenes brilliantly and more efficiently than any other part of the film.

De Niro and Savage performed their own stunts in the fall into the river, filming the 30 feet (9.1 m) drop 15 times in two days. During the helicopter stunt, the skids got caught on the rope bridge as the helicopter ascended, threatening to seriously injure De Niro and Savage. The actors gestured and shouted to the crew in the helicopter to warn them. Footage of this is included in the film.

According to Cimino, De Niro requested a live cartridge in the revolver for the scene in which he subjects John Cazale's character to an impromptu game of Russian roulette, to heighten the intensity of the situation. Cazale agreed without protest, but obsessively rechecked the gun before each take to be sure that the live round was not in the next chamber.

Although appearing later in the film, the first scenes shot in Thailand were the hospital sequences between Walken and the military doctor. Deeley believed that this scene was "the spur that would earn him an Academy Award". (Note: A clip from the scene between Walken and the military doctor was shown on a Sneak Previews special "Oscar Preview for 1978," in which critics Gene Siskel and Roger Ebert correctly predicted that Walken would win the Oscar for Best Supporting Actor.)

In the final scene between Mike and Nick in the gambling den, Cimino had Walken and De Niro improvise in one take. His direction to his actors: "You put the gun to your head, Chris, you shoot, you fall over and Bobby cradles your head."

==== Filming locations ====
Thailand

- Patpong, Bangkok, the area used to represent Saigon's red light district.
- Sai Yok, Kanchanaburi Province
- Mississippi Queen, go-go bar location used in the film.
- River Kwai, prison camp and initial Russian-roulette scene.

United States

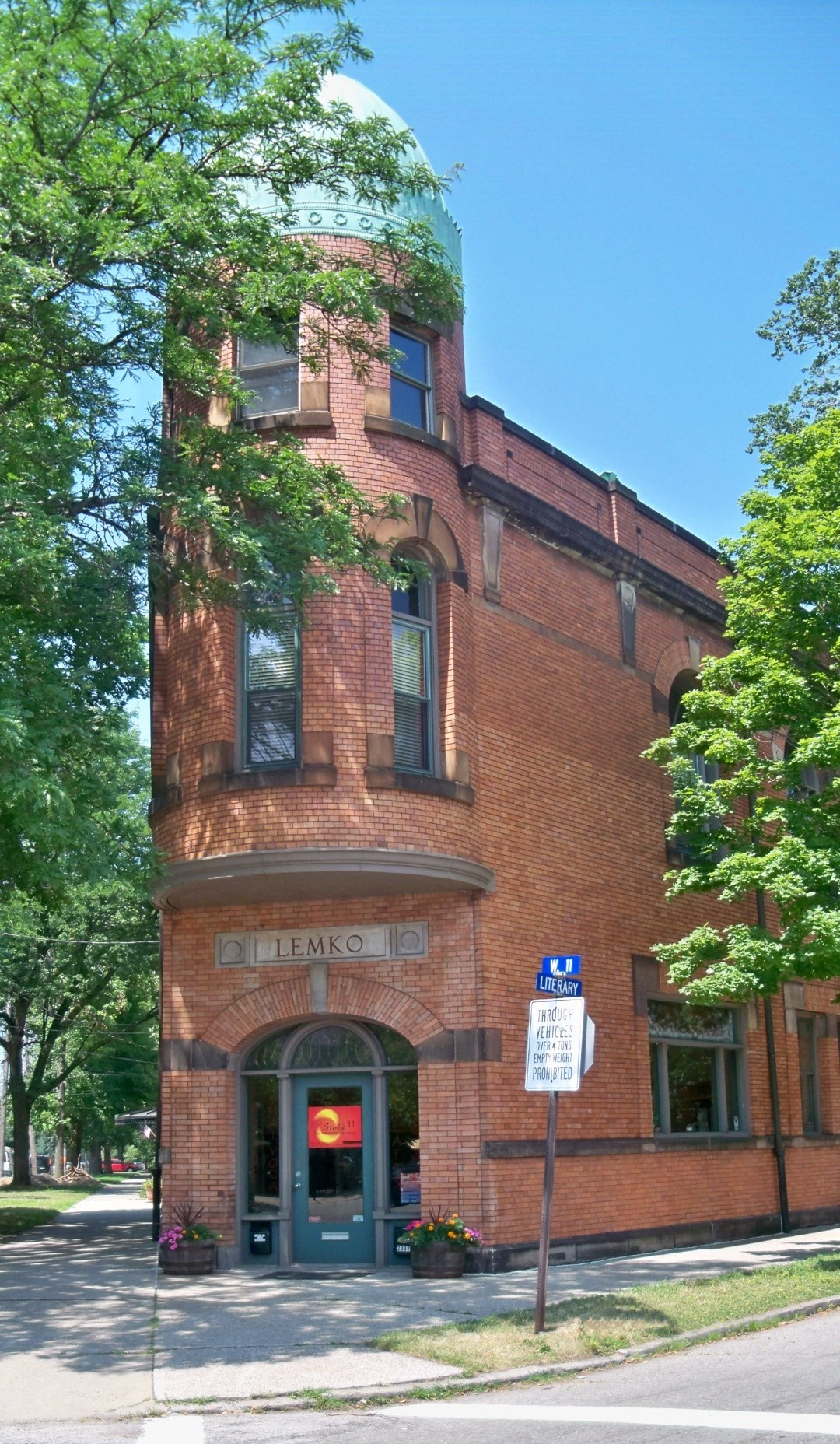
Lemko Hall

- St. Theodosius Russian Orthodox Cathedral, in the Tremont neighborhood of Cleveland, Ohio. The name plaque is clearly visible in one scene.
- Lemko Association Hall, Cleveland, Ohio. Also located in Tremont, the wedding banquet was filmed here. The name is clearly visible in one scene.
- U.S. Steel Central Furnaces in Cleveland, Ohio. Opening sequence steel mill scenes.
- Mount Baker-Snoqualmie National Forest and Nooksack Falls in the North Cascades range of Washington, deer hunting scenes. Also North Cascades Highway (SR 20), Diablo Lake.
- Steubenville, Ohio, for some mill and neighborhood shots.
- Struthers, Ohio, for external house and long-range road shots. As well, the town's bowling alley is the Bowladrome Lanes, located at 56 State Street, Struthers, Ohio.
- Weirton, West Virginia, for mill and trailer shots.

=== Post-production ===
By this point, The Deer Hunter had cost $13 million, and the film still had to go through an arduous post-production. Film editor Peter Zinner was given 600,000 feet (110 mi; 180 km) of printed film to edit, a monumental task at the time. Producers Spikings and Deeley were pleased with the first cut, which ran for three-and-a-half hours. "We were thrilled by what we saw," wrote Deeley, "and knew that within the three and a half hours we watched there was a riveting film."

Executives from Universal, including Lew Wasserman and Sid Sheinberg, were not very enthusiastic. "I think they were shocked," recalled Spikings. "What really upset them was 'God Bless America'. Sheinberg thought it was anti-American. He was vehement. He said something like, 'You're poking a stick in the eye of America.' They really didn't like the movie. And they certainly didn't like it at three hours and two minutes."

Deeley was not surprised by Universal's response. He said, "The Deer Hunter was a United Artists sort of picture, whereas Convoy was more in the style of Universal. I'd muddled and sold the wrong picture to each studio." Deeley did agree with Universal that the film needed to be shorter, not only because of pacing, but also to ensure commercial success. "A picture under two and a half hours can scrape three shows a day," wrote Deeley, "but at three hours you've lost one third of your screenings and one third of your income for the cinemas, distributors, and profit participants."

Universal president Thom Mount said, "This was just a... continuing nightmare from the day Michael finished the picture to the day we released it. That was simply because he was wedded to everything he shot. The movie was endless. It was The Deer Hunter and the Hunter and the Hunter. The wedding sequence was a cinematic event all unto its own." Mount said that he turned to Verna Fields, Universal's head of post-production. "I sicced Verna on Cimino," Mount said. "Verna was no slouch. She started to turn the heat up on Michael, and he started screeching and yelling."

Zinner eventually cut the film to 18,000 feet (3.4 mi; 5.5 km). Cimino soon fired Zinner when he discovered that Zinner was editing the wedding scenes. Ironically, Zinner won the Best Editing Oscar for The Deer Hunter. Regarding his clashes with Cimino, Zinner stated, "Michael Cimino and I had our differences at the end, but he kissed me when we both got Academy Awards." Cimino commented in The New York Observer, "[Zinner] was a moron ... I cut Deer Hunter myself."

==== Sound design ====
The Deer Hunter was Cimino's first film to use the Dolby noise-reduction system. "What Dolby does," replied Cimino, "is to give you the ability to create a density of detail of sound—a richness so you can demolish the wall separating the viewer from the film. You can come close to demolishing the screen." It took five months to mix the soundtrack. One short battle sequence—200 feet of film in the final cut—took five days to dub. Another sequence recreated the 1975 American evacuation of Saigon; Cimino brought the film's composer Stanley Myers to the location to listen to the auto, tank and jeep horns while the sequence was being photographed. The result, according to Cimino: Myers composed the music for that scene in the same key as the horn sounds, so that the music and the sound effects would blend with the images to create one jarring, desolate experience.

==== Previews ====
Both the long and short versions of the movie were previewed to Midwestern audiences, although there are differing accounts among Cimino, Deeley and Spikings regarding how the previews panned out. Director Cimino claimed that he bribed the projectionist to interrupt the shorter version to obtain better reviews of the longer one. According to producer Spikings, Wasserman let EMI's CEO Bernard Delfont decide between the two, and he chose Cimino's longer cut. Deeley claimed that the tested two-and-a-half-hour version had a better response.

== Soundtrack ==
The Deer Hunter

Soundtrack album by Stanley Myers
- Released: 1990
- Recorded: 1978
- Genre: Film score
- Label: Capitol

The soundtrack to The Deer Hunter was released on CD on October 25, 1990.

=== Selected tracks ===
- Stanley Myers's "Cavatina" (also known as "He Was Beautiful"), performed by classical guitarist John Williams, is commonly known as "The Theme from The Deer Hunter". According to producer Deeley, he discovered that the piece was originally written for a film called The Walking Stick (1970) and, as a result, had to pay the original purchaser an undisclosed sum.
- "Can't Take My Eyes Off You", a 1967 hit song sung by Frankie Valli. (Note: While featured prominently in the film, "Can't Take My Eyes Off You" does not appear on The Deer Hunter's soundtrack.) It is played in John's bar when all of the friends sing along and at the wedding reception. According to Cimino, the actors sang along to a recording of the song as it was played instead of singing to a beat track, a standard filmmaking practice. Cimino felt that it would make the singalong seem more realistic.
- During the wedding ceremonies and party, the Russian Orthodox song "Slava", and the Russian folk songs "Korobushka" and "Katyusha" are played.
- The final passage from Kamarinskaya by Mikhail Glinka is briefly heard when the men are driving through the mountains. Part of the opening section of the same work is heard during the second hunt when Michael is about to shoot the stag.
- Russian Orthodox funeral music is also employed during Nick's funeral scene, mainly "Vechnaya Pamyat", which means "eternal memory".
- In the scene before the film shifts to Vietnam, John plays Chopin's "Nocturne in G Minor" on the bar piano as the others listen in silence. George Dzundza appears to be actually playing it.

== Theatrical release ==
The producer Allan Carr took control of the movie's marketing and convinced the studio to allow the film to be played on the Z Channel before theatrical release.

The Deer Hunter debuted at one theater in New York and one in Los Angeles for a week on December 8, 1978. The release strategy was to qualify the film for Oscar consideration and close after a week to build interest.

After the Oscar nominations, Universal widened the distribution to include major cities, building up to a full-scale release on February 23, 1979, after the previous year's Oscars. The Deer Hunter pioneered a new release pattern for so-called prestige pictures that screen only at the end of the year to qualify for Academy Award recognition. The film eventually grossed $48.9 million at the US box office.

CBS paid $3.5 million for three runs of the film. The network later canceled the acquisition on the contractually permitted grounds of the film containing too much violence for US network transmission; the Russian-roulette scene was deemed controversial.

== Home media ==
The Deer Hunter has been released on DVD twice in the US. The first 1998 issue was by Universal, with no extra features and a non-anamorphic transfer, and has been discontinued. A second version, part of the "Legacy Series", was released as a two-disc set on September 6, 2005, with an anamorphic transfer of the film. The set features a cinematographer's commentary by Vilmos Zsigmond, as well as deleted and extended scenes and production notes.

The Region 2 release of The Deer Hunter, released in the UK and Japan, features a commentary track from director Michael Cimino.

The film was released on HD DVD on December 26, 2006.

StudioCanal released the film on the Blu-ray format in countries other than the United States on March 11, 2009. It was released on Blu-ray in the U.S. on March 6, 2012.

On May 26, 2020, Shout! Factory released the film on Ultra HD Blu-ray featuring a new Dolby Vision transfer.

== Analysis ==
=== Controversy over Russian roulette ===
Robert De Niro pulls the trigger in the game of Russian roulette that takes place in the Viet Cong prison scene.

One of the most talked-about sequences in the film, the Viet Cong's use of Russian roulette with POWs was criticized as being contrived and unrealistic because there were no documented cases of Russian roulette in the Vietnam War. Associated Press reporter Peter Arnett, who won a Pulitzer Prize for his coverage of the war, wrote in the Los Angeles Times, "In its 20 years of war, there was not a single recorded case of Russian roulette ... The central metaphor of the movie is simply a bloody lie."

Cimino countered that his film was not political, polemical, literally accurate, nor posturing for any particular point of view. Nevertheless, he also claimed that he had news clippings from Singapore that confirmed that Russian roulette was used during the war, without specifying which article.

==== Critics' response ====
In his review, Roger Ebert of the Chicago Sun-Times defended the artistic license of Russian roulette, arguing, "It is the organizing symbol of the film. Anything you can believe about the game, about its deliberately random violence, about how it touches the sanity of men forced to play it, will apply to the war as a whole. It is a brilliant symbol because, in the context of this story, it makes any ideological statement about the war superfluous."

Film critic and biographer David Thomson also agreed that the film works despite the controversy. "There were complaints that the North Vietnamese had not employed Russian roulette. It was said that the scenes in Saigon were fanciful or imagined. It was also suggested that De Niro, Christopher Walken, and John Savage were too old to have enlisted for Vietnam (Savage, the youngest of the three, was thirty). Three decades later [written in 2008], 'imagination' seems to have stilled those worries ... and The Deer Hunter is one of the great American films."

In her review, Pauline Kael of The New Yorker wrote, The Deer Hunter is the newest version of the "American 'gentleman' of the wilderness" and "the fullest screen treatment so far of the mystic bond of male comradeship." She goes on to say "The Vietcong [sic] are treated in the standard inscrutable-evil Oriental style of the Japanese in the Second World War movies ... The impression a viewer gets is that if we did some bad things there we did them ruthlessly but impersonally; the Vietcong were cruel and sadistic."

Critic Jonathan Rosenbaum of the Chicago Reader disliked the film: "A disgusting account of what the evil Vietnamese did to poor, innocent Americans stands at the center of this Oscar-laden weepie." He thought the cast was "uniformly good", yet "the male self-pity is so overwhelming that you’ll probably stagger out of this mumbling something about Tolstoy if you aren’t as nauseated as I was."

In his Vanity Fair article "The Vietnam Oscars", Peter Biskind wrote that the political agenda of The Deer Hunter was something of a mystery. "It may have been more a by-product of Hollywood myopia, the demands of the war-film genre, garden-variety American parochialism, and simple ignorance than it was the pre-meditated right-wing road map it seemed to many."

==== Cast and crew response ====
According to Christopher Walken, the historical context was not paramount. "In the making of it, I don't remember anyone ever mentioning Vietnam!" De Niro added to this sentiment. "Whether [the film's vision of the war] actually happened or not, it's something you could imagine very easily happening. Maybe it did. I don't know. All's fair in love and war." Producer Spikings, while proud of the film, regrets the way the Vietnamese are portrayed. "I don't think any of us meant it to be exploitive," Spikings said. "But I think we were ... ignorant. I can't think of a better word for it. I didn't realize how badly we'd behaved to the Vietnamese people ..."

Producer Deeley, on the other hand, was quick to defend Cimino's comments on the nature and motives of the film. "The Deer Hunter wasn't really 'about' Vietnam. It was something very different. It wasn't about drugs or the collapse of the morale of the soldiers. It was about how individuals respond to pressure: different men reacting quite differently. The film was about three steel workers in extraordinary circumstances. Apocalypse Now is surreal. The Deer Hunter is a parable ... Men who fight and lose an unworthy war, face some obvious and unpalatable choices. They can blame their leaders... or they can blame themselves. Self-blame has been a great burden for many war veterans. So how does a soldier come to terms with his defeat and yet still retain his self-respect? One way is to present the conquering enemy as so inhuman, and the battle between the good guys (us) and the bad guys (them) so uneven, as to render defeat irrelevant. Inhumanity was the theme of The Deer Hunter's portrayal of the North Vietnamese prison guards forcing American POWs to play Russian roulette. The audience's sympathy with prisoners who (quite understandably) cracked thus completes the chain. Accordingly, some veterans who suffered in that war found the Russian roulette a valid allegory."

=== Director Cimino's autobiographical intent ===
Cimino frequently referred to The Deer Hunter as a "personal" and "autobiographical" film, although subsequent investigation by journalists like Tom Buckley of Harper's Magazine revealed inaccuracies in Cimino's accounts and reported background. However, the wedding scene and the character of Nick were directly inspired by Cimino's real-life best friend. In a 2015 interview with The Hollywood Reporter, Cimino stated: "It's a very personal movie, that movie, even right down to the wedding. I mean, my best friend at the time was a White Russian, of White Russian-descent, Nikanor Chebotarevich. Which was the name that Christopher Walken has... And I was best man in his wedding." Historian Andrej Kotljarchuk later confirmed that Chebotarevich was a Belarusian who emigrated to the U.S. with his parents during World War II.

=== Male friendship ===
AFI's Movie Club says, "The film portrays male friendship in an atypical way for the time," and asks, "How does the friendship of the characters played by Robert De Niro, John Savage, Christopher Walken and John Cazale evolve throughout the film?"

=== Coda of "God Bless America" ===
The final scene in which all the main characters gather and sing "God Bless America" became a subject of heated debate among critics when the film was released. It raised the question of whether this conclusion was meant ironically or not—"as a critique of patriotism or a paean to it". Cimino later spoke of his intentions for the scene:

The ending is really, not meant to be so much a statement of patriotism, but a statement of communion. When people are in trouble, as they are when they're very troubled and sick inside, spiritually very sick, they need, sometimes to do something together. In this case it's make a sound. And they sing that song because it's a song that every American child knows by heart, because you're taught it in school. Everybody knows the words of "God Bless America", and so it's a communal sound, and they begin to sing the one song they all know from grade school on. And you never forget those words as long as you live. And so they sing... the one song they happen to know happens to be "God Bless America", and it reunites them as a family. It becomes a family communion. Instead of a Last Supper, it becomes a first breakfast, if you will, of a new family. It is breakfast that they're eating. It's not the Last Supper, it's the first breakfast.

== Reception ==
=== Critical response ===
On its release, The Deer Hunter received acclaim from critics, who considered it the best American epic since Francis Ford Coppola's The Godfather. The film was praised for its depiction of realistic working-class settings and environment; Cimino's direction; the performances of De Niro, Walken, Streep, Savage, Dzundza and Cazale; the symphonic shifts of tone and pacing in moving from America to Vietnam; the tension during the Russian-roulette scenes; and the themes of American disillusionment.

The film holds an approval rating of 86% on Rotten Tomatoes based on 129 reviews, with an average score of 8.80/10. The consensus reads: "Its greatness is blunted by its length and one-sided point of view, but the film's weaknesses are overpowered by Michael Cimino's sympathetic direction and a series of heartbreaking performances from Robert De Niro, Meryl Streep, and Christopher Walken". On Metacritic, the film has a weighted average score of 90 out of 100 based on reviews from 18 critics, indicating "universal acclaim".

Roger Ebert gave the film four stars out of four, and called it "one of the most emotionally shattering films ever made". Gene Siskel of the Chicago Tribune praised the film, saying, "This is a big film, dealing with big issues, made on a grand scale. Much of it, including some casting decisions, suggest inspiration by The Godfather."

Leonard Maltin also gave the film four stars, calling it a "sensitive, painful, evocative work".

Vincent Canby of The New York Times called The Deer Hunter "a big, awkward, crazily ambitious motion picture that comes as close to being a popular epic as any movie about this country since The Godfather. Its vision is that of an original, major new filmmaker."

David Denby of New York magazine called it "an epic", with "qualities that we almost never see any more—range and power and breadth of experience."

Jack Kroll of Time asserted that it put director Cimino "right at the center of film culture".

Stephen Farber pronounced in New West magazine that the movie is "the greatest anti-war movie since La Grande Illusion."

However, The Deer Hunter was not without critical backlash. Pauline Kael of The New Yorker wrote a positive review with some reservations: "[It is] a small minded film with greatness in it ... with an enraptured view of common life ... [but] enraging, because, despite its ambitiousness and scale, it has no more moral intelligence than the Eastwood action pictures."

William Goldman, in his book Adventures in the Screen Trade, described The Deer Hunter as a "well-disguised comic-book movie". He wrote, "I enjoyed it every bit as I used to be enthralled by Batman having it out with the Penguin—and precisely on that level."

Andrew Sarris of The New York Observer wrote that the film was "massively vague, tediously elliptical, and mysteriously hysterical ... It is perhaps significant that the actors remain more interesting than the characters they play."

John Simon of New York wrote, "For all its pretensions to something newer and better, this film is only an extension of the old Hollywood war-movie lie. The enemy is still bestial and stupid, and no match for our purity and heroism; only we no longer wipe up the floor with him—rather, we litter it with his guts."

In a review for Chicago magazine, Studs Terkel wrote that he was "appalled by its shameless dishonesty", and that "not since The Birth of a Nation has a non-Caucasian people been portrayed in so barbaric a fashion". Cimino's dishonesty "was to project a sadistic psyche not only onto 'Charlie' but to all the Vietnamese portrayed".

Author Karina Longworth notes that Streep "made a case for female empowerment by playing a woman to whom empowerment was a foreign concept—a normal lady from an average American small town, for whom subservience was the only thing she knew". She states that The Deer Hunter "evokes a version of dominant masculinity in which male friendship is a powerful force". It has a "credibly humanist message", and that the "slow study of the men in blissfully ignorant homeland machismo is crucial to it".

Despite its critical acclaim and awards, some critics derided what they considered the film's simplistic, bigoted and historically inaccurate depictions of the Viet Cong and America's position in the Vietnam War. The central theme of the Viet Cong forcing American captives to play Russian roulette has been widely criticized as having no historical basis, a claim that Cimino denied but did not refute with evidence.

During the 29th Berlin International Film Festival in 1979, the Soviet delegation expressed its indignation with the film that, in their opinion, insulted the Vietnamese people in numerous scenes. Other communist states also voiced their solidarity with the "heroic people of Vietnam". They protested the screening of the film and insisted that it violated the statutes of the festival because in no way does it contribute to the "improvement of mutual understanding between the peoples of the world". The ensuing domino effect led to the walk-outs of the Cubans, East Germans, Hungarians, Bulgarians, Poles and Czechoslovaks, and two members of the jury resigned in sympathy.

=== Top-ten lists ===
- 3rd—Roger Ebert, Chicago Sun-Times. Ebert also placed Deer Hunter on his list of the best films of the 1970s.
- 3rd—Gene Siskel, Chicago Tribune

Academy Award-winning film director Miloš Forman and Academy Award-nominated actor Mickey Rourke consider The Deer Hunter to be one of the greatest films of all time.

=== Revisionism following Heaven's Gate ===
Cimino's next film, Heaven's Gate (1980), debuted to lacerating reviews and took in only $3 million in ticket sales, effectively leaving United Artists bankrupt. The failure of Heaven's Gate led several critics to revise their positions on The Deer Hunter. Canby said in his famous review of Heaven's Gate, "[The film] fails so completely that you might suspect Mr. Cimino sold his soul to the Devil to obtain the success of The Deer Hunter, and the Devil has just come around to collect."

Andrew Sarris wrote in his review of Heaven's Gate, "I'm a little surprised that many of the same critics who lionized Cimino for The Deer Hunter have now thrown him to the wolves with equal enthusiasm." Sarris added, "I was never taken in ... Hence, the stupidity and incoherence in Heaven's Gate came as no surprise since very much the same stupidity and incoherence had been amply evident in The Deer Hunter."

In his book Final Cut: Dreams and Disaster in the Making of Heaven's Gate, Steven Bach wrote, "Critics seemed to feel obliged to go on the record about The Deer Hunter, to demonstrate that their critical credentials were un-besmirched by having been, as Andrew Sarris put it, 'taken in'."

Film critic Mark Kermode described Deer Hunter as "a genuinely terrible film".

However, many critics, including David Thomson and A. O. Scott, maintain that The Deer Hunter is a great film, the power of which has not diminished.

== Awards ==
Academy Awards record
1. Best Actor in a Supporting Role, Christopher Walken
2. Best Director, Michael Cimino
3. Best Film Editing, Peter Zinner
4. Best Picture, Barry Spikings, Michael Deeley, Michael Cimino, John Peverall
5. Best Sound, Richard Portman, William L. McCaughey, Aaron Rochin, C. Darin Knight
Golden Globe Awards record
1. Best Director – Motion Picture, Michael Cimino
BAFTA Awards record
1. Best Film Cinematography, Vilmos Zsigmond
2. Best Film Editing, Peter Zinner

=== Lead-up to awards season ===
Film producer and "old-fashioned mogul" Allan Carr used his networking abilities to promote The Deer Hunter. "Exactly how Allan Carr came into The Deer Hunter's orbit I can no longer remember," recalled producer Deeley, "but the picture became a crusade to him. He nagged, charmed, threw parties, he created word-of-mouth – everything that could be done in Hollywood to promote a project. Because he had no apparent motive for this promotion, it had an added power and legitimacy and it finally did start to penetrate the minds of the Universal's sales people that they actually had in their hands something a bit more significant than the usual." Deeley added that Carr's promotion of the film was influential in positioning The Deer Hunter for Oscar nominations.

On the Sneak Previews special "Oscar Preview for 1978", Roger Ebert correctly predicted that The Deer Hunter would win for Best Picture, while Gene Siskel predicted that Coming Home would win. However, Ebert incorrectly guessed that Robert De Niro would win for Best Actor for Deer Hunter and Jill Clayburgh would win for Best Actress for An Unmarried Woman, while Siskel called the wins for Jon Voight as Best Actor and Jane Fonda as Best Actress, both for Coming Home. Both Ebert and Siskel correctly predicted the win for Christopher Walken receiving the Oscar for Best Supporting Actor.

According to producer Deeley, orchestrated lobbying against The Deer Hunter was led by Warren Beatty, whose own picture Heaven Can Wait had multiple nominations. Beatty also used ex-girlfriends in his campaign: Julie Christie, serving on the jury at the Berlin Film Festival where Deer Hunter was screened, joined the walkout of the film by the Russian jury members. Jane Fonda also criticized The Deer Hunter in public. Deeley suggested that her criticisms partly stemmed from the competition between her film Coming Home vying with The Deer Hunter for Best Picture. According to Deeley, he planted a friend of his in the Oscar press area behind the stage to ask Fonda if she had seen The Deer Hunter. Fonda replied she had not seen the film, and to this day she still has not.

As the Oscars drew near, the backlash against The Deer Hunter gathered strength. When the limos pulled up to the Dorothy Chandler Pavilion on April 9, 1979, they were met by demonstrators, mostly from the Los Angeles chapter of Vietnam Veterans Against the War. The demonstrators waved placards covered with slogans that read "No Oscars for racism" and "The Deer Hunter a bloody lie", and they thrust pamphlets berating Deer Hunter into long lines of limousine windows. Washburn, nominated for Best Original Screenplay, claimed that his limousine was pelted with stones. According to Variety, "Police and The Deer Hunter protesters clashed in a brief but bloody battle that resulted in 13 arrests."

De Niro was so anxious that he did not attend the Oscars ceremony. He asked the Academy to allow him to sit out the show backstage, but when the Academy refused, De Niro stayed home in New York. Producer Deeley made a deal with fellow producer David Puttnam, whose film Midnight Express was nominated, that each would take $500 to the ceremony so if one of them won, the winner would give the loser the $500 to "drown his sorrows in style".

=== Complete list of awards ===
Award	Category	Nominee(s)	Result	Ref.
Academy Awards	Best Picture	Barry Spikings, Michael Deeley, Michael Cimino and John Peverall	Won	
Academy Awards	Best Director	Michael Cimino	Won	
Academy Awards	Best Actor	Robert De Niro	Nominated	
Academy Awards	Best Supporting Actor	Christopher Walken	Won	
Academy Awards	Best Supporting Actress	Meryl Streep	Nominated	
Academy Awards	Best Screenplay – Written Directly for the Screen	Deric Washburn, Michael Cimino, Louis A. Garfinkle and Quinn K. Redeker	Nominated	
Academy Awards	Best Cinematography	Vilmos Zsigmond	Nominated	
Academy Awards	Best Film Editing	Peter Zinner	Won	
Academy Awards	Best Sound	Richard Portman, William McCaughey, Aaron Rochin and Darin Knight	Won	
American Cinema Editors Awards	Best Edited Feature Film	Peter Zinner	Won	
American Movie Awards	Best Film		Nominated	
American Movie Awards	Best Director	Michael Cimino	Won	
American Movie Awards	Best Actor	Robert De Niro	Nominated	
American Movie Awards	Best Supporting Actor	Christopher Walken	Nominated	
American Movie Awards	Best Supporting Actress	Meryl Streep	Won	
Blue Ribbon Awards	Best Foreign Language Film	Michael Cimino	Won	
British Academy Film Awards	Best Film	Michael Cimino	Nominated	
British Academy Film Awards	Best Direction	Michael Cimino	Nominated	
British Academy Film Awards	Best Actor in a Leading Role	Robert De Niro	Nominated	
British Academy Film Awards	Best Actress in a Leading Role	Meryl Streep	Nominated	
British Academy Film Awards	Best Actor in a Supporting Role	Christopher Walken	Nominated	
British Academy Film Awards	Best Screenplay	Deric Washburn	Nominated	
British Academy Film Awards	Best Cinematography	Vilmos Zsigmond	Won	
British Academy Film Awards	Best Editing	Peter Zinner	Won	
British Academy Film Awards	Best Sound	Darin Knight, Jim Klinger and Richard Portman	Nominated	
Directors Guild of America Awards	Outstanding Directorial Achievement in Motion Pictures	Michael Cimino	Won	
Golden Globe Awards	Best Motion Picture – Drama		Nominated	
Golden Globe Awards	Best Actor in a Motion Picture – Drama	Robert De Niro	Nominated	
Golden Globe Awards	Best Supporting Actor – Motion Picture	Christopher Walken	Nominated	
Golden Globe Awards	Best Supporting Actress – Motion Picture	Meryl Streep	Nominated	
Golden Globe Awards	Best Director – Motion Picture	Michael Cimino	Won	
Golden Globe Awards	Best Screenplay – Motion Picture	Deric Washburn	Nominated	
Hochi Film Awards	Best International Picture	Michael Cimino	Won	
Japan Academy Film Prize	Outstanding Foreign Language Film		Won	
Kinema Junpo Awards	Best Foreign Director	Michael Cimino	Won	
Los Angeles Film Critics Association Awards	Best Film		Nominated	
Los Angeles Film Critics Association Awards	Best Director	Michael Cimino	Won	
Los Angeles Film Critics Association Awards	Best Actor	Robert De Niro	Nominated	
Los Angeles Film Critics Association Awards	Best Supporting Actor	Christopher Walken	Nominated	
National Film Preservation Board	National Film Registry	The Deer Hunter	Inducted	
National Society of Film Critics Awards	Best Film	The Deer Hunter	2nd Place (Note: Tied with An Unmarried Woman)	
National Society of Film Critics Awards	Best Director	Michael Cimino	3rd Place	
National Society of Film Critics Awards	Best Actor	Robert De Niro	5th Place	
National Society of Film Critics Awards	Best Supporting Actor	Christopher Walken	3rd Place	
National Society of Film Critics Awards	Best Supporting Actress	Meryl Streep	Won	
New York Film Critics Circle Awards	Best Film	The Deer Hunter	Won	
New York Film Critics Circle Awards	Best Actor	Robert De Niro	Runner-up	
New York Film Critics Circle Awards	Best Supporting Actor	Christopher Walken	Won	
New York Film Critics Circle Awards	Best Supporting Actress	Meryl Streep	Runner-up	
Online Film & Television Association Awards	Hall of Fame – Motion Picture		Won	
Writers Guild of America Awards	Best Drama Written Directly for the Screen	Deric Washburn, Michael Cimino, Louis Garfinkle and Quinn K. Redeker	Nominated	

== Legacy ==
The Deer Hunter is among the early, and most controversial, major theatrical films to be critical of the American involvement in Vietnam after 1975, when the war officially ended. Although the film opened in the same year as Hal Ashby's Coming Home, Sidney Furie's The Boys in Company C, and Ted Post's Go Tell the Spartans, it is the first film about Vietnam to reach a wide audience and critical acclaim, culminating in winning the Oscar for Best Picture. Other films that illustrate the conditions of the Vietnam War combat include:

- Francis Ford Coppola's Apocalypse Now (1979)
- Oliver Stone's Platoon (1986)
- Stanley Kubrick's Full Metal Jacket (1987)
- Brian De Palma's Casualties of War (1989)
- Oliver Stone's Born on the Fourth of July (1989)

David Thomson wrote in an article titled "The Deer Hunter: Story of a scene" that the film changed the way war-time battles were portrayed on film. "The terror and the blast of firepower changed the war film, even if it only used a revolver. More or less before the late 1970s, the movies had lived by a Second World War code in which battle scenes might be fierce but always rigorously controlled. The Deer Hunter unleashed a new, raw dynamic in combat and action, paving the way for Platoon, Saving Private Ryan and Clint Eastwood's Iwo Jima films."

In a 2011 interview with Rotten Tomatoes, actor William Fichtner stated that he and his partner were silenced after seeing the film, stating that "the human experience was just so pointed; their journeys were so difficult, as life is sometimes. I remember after seeing it, walking down the street—I actually went with a girl on a date and saw The Deer Hunter, and we left the theater and walked for like an hour and nobody said anything; we were just kind of stunned about that."

The deaths of approximately 25 people who died playing Russian roulette were reported as having been influenced by scenes in the movie.

=== Honors and recognition ===
In 1996, The Deer Hunter was selected for preservation in the United States National Film Registry by the Library of Congress as being "culturally, historically, or aesthetically significant".

American Film Institute included the film as #79 in AFI's 100 Years...100 Movies, #30 in AFI's 100 Years...100 Thrills, and #53 in AFI's 100 Years...100 Movies (10th Anniversary Edition).

The film ranks 467th in the Empire magazine's 2008 list of the 500 greatest movies of all time, noting:

Cimino's bold, powerful 'Nam epic goes from blue-collar macho rituals to a fiery, South East Asian hell and back to a ragged singalong of America the Beautiful [sic]. De Niro holds it together, but Christopher Walken, Meryl Streep and John Savage are unforgettable.

The New York Times placed the film on its "Best 1000 Movies Ever" list.

Jan Scruggs, a Vietnam veteran who became a counselor with the U.S. Department of Labor, thought of the idea of building a National Memorial for Vietnam Veterans after seeing a screening of the film in March 1979, and he established and operated the memorial fund that paid for it. Director Cimino was invited to the memorial's opening.

In 2016, the Directors Guild of America ranked the film 60th on its list of The 80 Best-Directed Films since the Guild’s founding in 1936.

== See also ==
- The Deer Hunter (novel) (1978)
- The Last Hunter (1980), an Italian film originally made as an unofficial sequel
