= Darin Knight =

American sound engineer

- Occupation: Sound engineer
- Years active: 1974-present

Darin Knight is an American sound engineer. He won an Oscar for Best Sound for the film The Deer Hunter.

== Selected filmography ==
- The Deer Hunter (1978)
