= Deric Washburn =

American screenwriter

Deric Washburn is an American screenwriter.

Washburn graduated from Harvard College in 1959. He began his career as a playwright, penning the off-Broadway plays Ginger Anne and The Love Nest.

He is best known for having written the original screenplay of The Deer Hunter after having co-written the story with Michael Cimino, with whom he had previously worked on scripting the science fiction film, Silent Running in 1971. The film won the Academy Award for Best Picture in 1978.

Washburn and Cimino spent three days writing the story, and then Washburn spent a month writing the script. Cimino then tried to deny him screenwriting credit. Washburn went to arbitration and was given full credit.

== Filmography ==
- Silent Running (1971)
- The Deer Hunter (1978)
- The Border (1982)
- Extreme Prejudice (1987)

== Unproduced scripts ==
- Heavy Dust, adapted from Manhunt by Peter Maas
- Gun for Sale, adapted from the book of the same name by Graham Greene
- Two Days in Detroit, an original screenplay co-written with Rudy Wurlitzer
- Warrior, based on a screenplay by Dale Herd and Winston Jones
- The Murder of Napoleon, adapted from the book of the same name by Ben Weider and David Hapgood
- Yamashita's Gold, based on the alleged war loot stolen by the Japanese during World War II

== Awards ==
As a member of the Actors Studio playwriting project, he received a $1500.00 award from the Edward Albee Foundation in 1964.

As a writer, Washburn was nominated for an Academy Award for Best Writing (Original Screenplay) and a WGA Award for "Best Drama Written Directly for the Screen" for The Deer Hunter, along with Quinn Redeker, Louis A. Garfinkle and Michael Cimino.
