= Louis A. Garfinkle =

American screenwriter

Louis Alan Garfinkle (1928–2005) was an American scriptwriter and the co-developer of the Collaborator computer screenwriting program. He was nominated for the Academy Award for Best Original Screenplay with four others for The Deer Hunter. He died of complications from Parkinson's disease at his home in Studio City in 2005.

He was born in Seattle in 1928 and studied at the University of Southern California from which he received his B.A. in 1948.

Garfinkle was one of the co-creators with director Cary Brown and fellow screenwriter Francis Feighan of the Collaborator, an interactive scriptwriting computer program that was popular in the 1990s. Garfinkle's obituary in the Los Angeles Times stated that Collaborator "poses questions aimed at shaping a movie treatment and prods the writer to flesh out characters".

Garfinkle also co-wrote the story for the 1973 Broadway musical Molly that starred Kaye Ballard.

Garfinkle collaborated on five films with the director Albert Band.

== Credits ==
- The Young Guns (1956)
- I Bury the Living (1958)
- Face of Fire (1959)
- The Doberman Gang (1972)
- Little Cigars (1973)
- The Deer Hunter (1978) (co-writer)
