= Comes a Horseman =

1978 film by Alan J. Pakula

- film poster by Robert McGinnis
- Directed by: Alan J. Pakula
- Written by: Dennis Lynton Clark
- Produced by: Gene Kirkwood; Dan Paulson
- Starring: James Caan; Jane Fonda; Jason Robards
- Cinematography: Gordon Willis
- Edited by: Marion Rothman
- Music by: Michael Small
- Distributed by: United Artists
- Release date: October 25, 1978
- Running time: 118 minutes
- Country: United States
- Language: English
- Budget: $10-12 million
- Box office: $9,585,769

Comes a Horseman is a 1978 American Western drama film starring James Caan, Jane Fonda, Jason Robards, and Richard Farnsworth, directed by Alan J. Pakula.

Set in the American West of the 1940s but not a typical Western, it tells the story of two ranchers, Frank "Buck" Athearn (Caan) and Ella Conners (Fonda), whose small operation is threatened both by economic hardship and the expansionist dreams of local land baron Jacob "J.W." Ewing (Robards).

== Plot ==
It's the 1940s, near the end of World War II in the American West. The setting is a large, fertile valley ideal for grazing cattle. Rancher Jacob W. Ewing's family has lived in the valley for generations, and his dream is to control all of it and preserve it from those - farmers and oilmen, for example - who would use the land for other purposes. Visiting J.W. is wealthy oil executive Neil Atkinson, whose late father was J.W.'s good friend and financial backer; the Atkinsons helped J.W. buy out neighboring ranchers, taking advantage of their financial problems (often with some "persuasion" from J.W.'s henchmen). The one remaining holdout is Ella Connors, whose family has ranched in the area for the last two generations and who relies on the family's aging but skillful cowhand Dodger. Another small player is war veteran Frank Athearn to whom Ella has sold a small plot of land to pay her bills. Ella and J.W. have some personal history which Ella prefers to put behind her, but which J.W. keeps bringing up. Although J.W. believes that Ella cannot survive another season financially, Ella and Frank, both of whom are committed to making a living ranching, enter into an uneasy alliance, especially after a dangerous incident precipitated by J.W. involving Frank and Frank's partner, fellow veteran Billy Joe Meynart. Neil, meanwhile, wants to explore the entire valley for oil, and uses his family's financial support to pressure J.W. into agreeing. Ella, Frank, and Neil soon discover that J.W. will go to any lengths to get what he wants.

== Cast ==
- James Caan as Frank "Buck" Athearn
- Jane Fonda as Ella Connors
- Jason Robards as Jacob "J.W." Ewing
- George Grizzard as Neil Atkinson
- Richard Farnsworth as Dodger
- Jim Davis as Julie Blocker
- Mark Harmon as Billy Joe Meynert
- Macon McCalman as Virgil Hoverton
- Basil Hoffman as George Bascomb
- James Kline as Ralph Cole
- James Keach as Emil Kroegh

== Production ==
The film was based on an original script Comes a Horseman Wild and Free. In January 1977 it was announced that Jane Fonda and James Caan would play the leads.

"The theme of this film is very, very American," said Alan J. Pakula.

On 18 August 1977, a stuntman working on this film, Jim Sheppard, was killed while doing a scene where Jason Robards' character Jacob "J.W." Ewing is dragged to (presumably) his death. A horse dragging him veered from its course and caused Sheppard to hit his head on a fence post. The scene made it into the movie, but it is cut right before the horse passes through the gate where the fatal accident occurred.

== Reception ==
Gene Siskel of the Chicago Tribune gave the film three-and-a-half stars out of four and called it "a fine film—majestic at times—save for a slapdash ending." A less enthusiastic review in Variety stated the film was "so lethargic not even Jane Fonda, James Caan and Jason Robards can bring excitement to this artificially dramatic story of a stubborn rancher who won't surrender to the local land baron." Charles Champlin of the Los Angeles Times wrote that the film "is not about the plot as such but about the way of life which the plot interrupts. The care and authenticity with which that way of life is recorded helps Comes a Horseman overcome some real problems, notably a pace that is all too reverentially slow and a totally inadequate delineation of the Robards character." Gary Arnold of The Washington Post stated "Pakula and Clark may believe they revere Westerns, but their form of respectful imitation is lifeless, strictly token respect for the dead...By the time Comes a Horseman wheezes to an anticlimactic fadeout, Robards' depredations have begun to resemble Gothic camp."

Richard Farnsworth received a nomination for the Academy Award for Best Supporting Actor for his performance at the 51st Academy Awards.

The film grossed $9.6 million at the box office. The film holds a score of 67% on Rotten Tomatoes, based on 12 reviews.
