= Hal Ashby's unrealized projects =

During his career, American film director Hal Ashby worked on a number of projects which never progressed beyond the pre-production stage under his direction. Some of these productions fell into development hell or were cancelled, while others remain unrealized as of his death.

== 1950s ==
=== Brave New World ===
In his early days in the industry working as an assistant editor, Ashby discussed with his friend Tom Blackwell the possibilities of turning Aldous Huxley's Brave New World into a film. Ashby decided it wasn't viable, believing the material to be "way too far ahead of the Zeitgeist" at the time.

=== The Sound of Silence ===
Around 1958, Ashby and Ian Bernard wrote a film script inspired by their activities with the antinuclear group SANE titled The Sound of Silence. Set twenty years after the dropping of the atomic bomb, the story follows a war correspondent obsessed with Hiroshima who begins a personal crusade to prevent further nuclear activity. Ashby and Bernard both thought of Robert Mitchum for the lead role, feeling he would be sympathetic with the film's views. Mitchum was supposedly interested, but nothing came of it.

== 1970s ==
=== Owen Butler ===
After shooting was completed on Harold and Maude, Ashby was setting up to direct a screenplay by Joseph Gillette titled Owen Butler, a satire in which the main protagonist systematically kills a number of high-profile figures and gets away with it. He already pitched the project to Robert Evans and interested Beau Bridges in the lead role, planning to get it made through a short-lived company he and Charles B. Mulvehill had just set up, Dumb Fuck Films.

=== Hair ===
In April 1972, Ashby was approached by producer Michael Butler to direct the film version of his stage musical Hair. After word got out that Ashby pulled out of directing North Dallas Forty, Butler told him that the offer to direct Hair was still on the table. By July 1974, a deal was set up to make the film at Paramount, with Colin Higgins and Michael D. Haller signed as screenwriter and production designer, respectively. While editing commenced on Shampoo, Ashby decided to go to England with Butler to work on ideas for Hair. However, Ashby eventually withdrew from the project due to ill health and, as Butler suspected, was "worried sick about the scope of the film project." The film was made in 1979 without his participation.

=== One Flew Over the Cuckoo's Nest ===
Simultaneously as Butler was trying to sign him to direct Hair, Ashby was in talks with Michael Douglas about adapting Ken Kesey's One Flew Over the Cuckoo's Nest, which Ashby would direct, Kesey would write, and Douglas would produce along with Saul Zaentz. After finishing shooting The Last Detail, Ashby returned to the project, and met up with Kesey in February 1973 to work on the script. Douglas and Zaentz wanted the film ready to shoot in July. Ashby began auditioning actors in New York that May, including Danny DeVito, James Woods, F. Murray Abraham, William Devane, Meat Loaf and John Belushi. Ashby wanted Jack Nicholson to play the lead character McMurphy, but both Douglas and Zaentz claimed he asked for too much money. When they continued to express dissatisfaction with Kesey's work, he and Ashby withdrew from the project. "I worked on that for a whole year or more and they wouldn't cast Jack Nicholson in the part," Ashby later said. "So I took a walk. That's the truth. They made up excuses." Ironically, Nicholson was later cast by Ashby's replacement, Miloš Forman, who also replaced him on Hair.

=== Three Cornered Circle ===
While Kesey was writing the screenplay for One Flew Over the Cuckoo's Nest, Ashby signed to direct MGM's Three Cornered Circle (alternately titled No Way Out), which was a modern take on James M. Cain's classic novel The Postman Always Rings Twice. Ashby saw potential in the script and immediately started pursuing Jack Nicholson to play the lead. Ashby shot screen tests with Andrew Davis of Nicholson and his then-girlfriend Michelle Phillips (who Ashby wanted to cast alongside him), but MGM balked at the choice. They wanted Raquel Welch to play the female lead and since they never came to agree, Nicholson and Ashby left the project and made The Last Detail together instead. Nicholson later brought the property to director Bob Rafelson in the early 1980s, and the film was produced as the only production under Ashby's NorthStar company banner.

=== Arigato ===
During filming of The Last Detail, Peter Sellers, who wanted to work with Ashby, sent him a number of scripts including Arigato, based on Richard Condon's comic novel about a wine heist. Ashby enlisted Terry Southern to help with the script. Later, after One Flew Over the Cuckoo's Nest fell through, Ashby went to London to discuss Arigato with Sellers as well as Jerzy Kosinski's Being There, which the two would eventually realize in 1979.

=== North Dallas Forty ===
In March 1974, Ashby was announced as the director of Paramount Pictures' North Dallas Forty, with Jeremy Larner set to write, but he later pulled out of the deal. It was eventually directed by Ted Kotcheff, released in 1979.

=== Alice Doesn't Live Here Anymore ===
After shooting was completed on Shampoo, Ellen Burstyn contacted Ashby about directing her in Alice Doesn't Live Here Anymore, from a script by Robert Getchell. Burstyn later told Ashby, "I was torn between you and Marty Scorsese, and finally decided on Marty because of a certain hard edge in Mean Streets that I thought would balance a certain softness in the Alice script."

=== Zebulon ===
While previewing Shampoo, Ashby struck a development deal with United Artists to direct Rudy Wurlitzer's script Zebulon (alternately titled Beyond the Mountain), a Western about the myth of the American frontier originally written for Sam Peckinpah. Ashby also passed on Zebulon when it failed to fill UA with sufficient confidence. Later on, indie filmmaker Jim Jarmusch expressed interest in the script, and spent time with Wurlitzer until it became clear that he wanted to take it in a different direction. They parted ways, and according to Wurlitzer, Jarmusch incorporated ideas of Zebulon into his film Dead Man.

=== The Great Brink's Robbery ===
After the release of Shampoo, Ashby was briefly linked to The Great Brink's Robbery (later named The Brink's Job), with Dustin Hoffman attached to star as gang leader Tony Pino. William Friedkin eventually directed the film, with Peter Falk in the Pino role.

=== I Never Promised You a Rose Garden ===
For his next project, Ashby considered taking on I Never Promised You a Rose Garden, a novel about a suicidal teenage girl in a psychiatric hospital, or Bound for Glory. He chose to direct latter instead, fearing that with the release of One Flew Over the Cuckoo's Nest it would seem as though he were trying to capitalize on its success with Rose Garden.

=== Henderson the Rain King ===
During production of Bound for Glory, film editor Robert C. Jones gave Ashby a treatment he wrote. After Ashby read it, he employed Jones to help with rewrites on Bound for Glory and to adapt Saul Bellow's Henderson the Rain King, a property he had just acquired. Ashby had planned to have Jack Nicholson play Henderson, the middle-aged American who travels to Africa.

=== The Hawkline Monster ===
In early 1976, Ashby announced plans to shoot The Hawkline Monster, a Gothic Western by the cult author Richard Brautigan, but not until the following summer, as he was not yet happy with Brautigan's script adaptation. He returned to the project after directing Coming Home, and rewrote Brautigan's draft by himself. In late 1982, Ashby was leaning toward doing the film with Jack Nicholson, and Dustin Hoffman and Clint Eastwood both considered to play the second lead, but the idea was put on hold. In 1988, at the same time he was preparing to direct Hand Carved Coffins and Vital Parts, Ashby was finally attempting to realize The Hawkline Monster, enlisting Rick Padilla to help him put together a step outline. He also lined up Nicholson and Harry Dean Stanton to play the two leads. Ultimately, he was forced to shelve these projects when he became terminally ill. Ashby had spent upwards of $100,000 of his own money just developing the film.

It wasn't until years later, in 2019, that the project reentered development in a deal that involved the estates of both Ashby and Brautigan.

=== No Beast So Fierce ===
In July 1976, Ashby was listed as the director of No Beast So Fierce (later called Straight Time), based on the semi-autobiographical novel by ex-con Edward Bunker. The project was brought to him by Dustin Hoffman, who had initially planned to direct as well as act, but changed his mind. However, Ashby had suffered heavy amounts of dust inhalation during production of Bound for Glory and was not able to accommodate the schedule due to his hospitalization. First Artists refused to delay the start date for his recovery and instead proceeded without him, hiring Ulu Grosbard in his place.

=== American Me ===
At the time of Coming Home's release, Ashby was considering directing American Me for Paramount as his next project, but by May 1978 he didn't feel the script was strong enough to proceed, so he passed on it. It was then announced that Floyd Mutrux was set to direct but the project was delayed until 1991, when Edward James Olmos boarded to produce and direct, as well as star.

=== Popeye ===
Ashby was also considering directing Popeye, with Dustin Hoffman at that time set to star. While Ashby wanted to work with Hoffman on a film, he allegedly withdrew from the project after a falling out the actor had with Jules Feiffer, who had been hired to write the screenplay. Robin Williams later took Hoffman's place, and the resulting film was released in 1980.

=== Journey to India ===
In May 1978, Ashby signed a multi-picture contract with Lorimar Productions and Jack Schwartzman's JS Productions. In development under their deal was a then-untitled love triangle story Journey to India, written by Rudy Wurlitzer and two others written by Robert Downey and William Hjortsberg. Ashby would choose to direct Being There, Second-Hand Hearts and Lookin' to Get Out as his three films for the company instead.

=== Almost Together ===
Also in development under Ashby's Lorimar deal was a script by Robert Downey Sr., Almost Together (alternately titled Victor Hiatus), which follows the plight of a man randomly selected to save the world who is more interested in getting laid. Downey later recalled that, at Ashby's request, Lorimar paid him to write the script, despite that he'd already written it.

=== Roadshow ===
The third Lorimar project developed for Ashby, Roadshow (alternately titled Spangler), was a Western written by novelist William Hjortsberg, described as "a modern-day Robin Hood story." Ashby returned to it in 1986 after his deal to direct LaBrava fell through. However, a rights issue put the project into turnaround.

=== Grossing Out ===
In 1979, after Being There, Ashby wanted to work with Peter Sellers again on a film written by Terry Southern called Grossing Out, about a toy designer who makes a pact with the Pentagon to produce weapons of mass destruction. After Sellers died, the film was scrapped.

== 1980s ==
=== Hand Carved Coffins ===
In early 1980, producer Lester Persky turned to Ashby to direct an adaptation of Truman Capote's novella "Handcarved Coffins" soon after its publication. A deal with United Artists was struck for Ashby to start production on the film in March, however, Judith Rascoe's script failed to live up to expectations, and the project was put on hold for rewrites. Ashby would return to the project in early 1988 when he received a call from Persky asking him to have another go at it. Eager to find work after being relegated to television production, Ashby threw himself into rewriting the Hand Carved Coffins screenplay. In July that year, Ashby and Persky scouted locations in New Mexico in search of a secluded Western town that would provide the backdrop for the story. Soon after, Jack Nicholson signed on to play the lead—detective Jake Pepper—and filming was scheduled for summer 1989 after Nicholson had finished shooting Batman in England. Ashby died before production could begin.

=== Kalki ===
After Hand Carved Coffins was put on hold, Ashby was approached by his friend Mick Jagger about directing an adaptation of Kalki, the apocalyptic novel by Gore Vidal. Jagger bought the rights to Kalki in 1978 and had convinced Vidal himself to write the screenplay for the film. In 1981, it was reported that it would start shooting in the latter part of the year, but this plan had to be revised as too many elements of the film were a turnoff to the major studios. Jagger wanted a comic actress the likes of Goldie Hawn, Diane Keaton or Jane Fonda to play the role of the lesbian character Teddy, but none were willing to take the risk. In the end, Alec Guinness was the only other well-known star who committed to the project. By early 1983, Kalki was put into turnaround, though Ashby and Jagger would still collaborate; on the live concert documentary Let's Spend the Night Together.

=== Laughing War ===
In early 1980, there was some discussion between Ashby and Dustin Hoffman that they would work together on an adaptation of Martyn Burke's Laughing War, but Hoffman brought him on later that year to direct him in Tootsie instead.

=== Tootsie ===
In late 1980, Dustin Hoffman enlisted Ashby to direct him in Tootsie, after original director Dick Richards stepped down. In May 1981, Ashby shot screen tests with Haskell Wexler of Hoffman dressed in drag in character as Dorothy Michaels. He then had Hoffman improvise scenes with strangers. They planned to shoot Tootsie in the fall when Lookin' to Get Out was finished editing. However, in September that year, Lorimar announced that they would sue Ashby and Columbia if he began work on Tootsie before he had delivered Lookin' to Get Out. Soon after, Columbia forced Ashby to quit, and Sydney Pollack was hired in his place.

=== Jack the Bear ===
In 1982, Ashby was almost hired by producer Bruce Gilbert to direct Jack the Bear. The film was made later in 1993, and directed by Marshall Herskovitz.

=== Tougher Than Leather ===
Around the same time, Ashby flirted with doing a musical project, and reached out to Willie Nelson about the idea of turning his as-yet-unreleased album Tougher Than Leather into a film. The two met, but the project never got past the planning stage.

=== Modern Bride ===
Mike Medavoy of Orion Pictures wanted to reestablish a partnership with Ashby, and sign him to direct Modern Bride, a romantic comedy that was to star Diane Keaton. The project collapsed at Orion as a result of budget and creative differences with Keaton, (who was to co-produce with Richard N. Roth). In February 1983, Tim Hunter was slated to direct Keaton in the film, for MGM.

=== Bake and Shake ===
Medavoy also proposed to Ashby the basketball comedy Bake and Shake, written by Rudy Wurlitzer and with Jack Nicholson talked up as a possible star. Wurlitzer's script centers on a down-on-his-luck black pimp Shake Indigo and his old friend Bake MacLain, a white basketball coach. Orion and Universal both passed on it.

=== Another Roadside Attraction ===
According to Michael Dare, Ashby had planned to direct his screenplay adaptation of Tom Robbins' Another Roadside Attraction, starring Richard Dreyfuss, Robin Williams, Treat Williams, Brooke Adams, Penelope Milford and John Belushi. He later relinquished his role to Dare to make it himself as his directorial debut, telling him, "I'm not going to show up on the first day of shooting, and I'm going to recommend that you direct the picture." Dare later explained that right before Ashby died, he would go to his house every weekend to learn about how to direct.

=== Kramer vs. Kramer sequel ===
In late 1982, Dustin Hoffman announced that he wanted to make a sequel to Kramer vs. Kramer, and he and Ashby began working on it. In the follow-up film, referred to at the time as Kramer II or simply K-II, Ted Kramer and his son move in with a divorcee who has a child with Down syndrome. Ashby, along with producer Gail Mutrux, learned everything he could about Down syndrome, reading articles and studies on the subject, and met with families who had children with the condition.

=== Untitled Hiroshima project ===
Simultaneously as the Kramer vs. Kramer sequel, Ashby, Dustin Hoffman, and Gail Mutrux were researching the subject of the aftermath of the Hiroshima bombing, with an eye to developing a related film. In the spring of 1983, Ashby went to Japan to conduct research.

=== Country ===
In early 1983, actress Jessica Lange interested Ashby in a project with the working title "Modern Day Farm Drama" (later called Country), a contemporary film about farmers' extreme financial difficulties, in the vein of The Grapes of Wrath. He was signed on to supervise William D. Wittliff in the writing of the screenplay and to direct the movie in the fall that year, in order to capture the corn harvest on film as it happened. However, The Ladd Company was obligated to drop the project after financial problems with The Right Stuff, and Ashby left soon after. Witliff took over, and made it his feature film directorial debut.

=== Touch and Go ===
In August 1984, Ashby was announced as the director of Touch and Go, before it had been removed from Orion Pictures' production slate. Robert Mandel directed the film, in 1986.

=== Summertime remake ===
During the production of 8 Million Ways to Die, Ashby expressed his interest to Rosanna Arquette in casting her in a remake of the 1955 David Lean film Summertime, but wanted to wait until she was old enough to play the part.

=== LaBrava ===
In February 1986, Dustin Hoffman contacted Ashby to ask him if he was interested in working with him on a film version of Elmore Leonard's novel LaBrava, about an ex-secret service agent who becomes involved in blackmail. Ashby wanted to cast either Debbie Reynolds, June Allyson, or Kathryn Grayson opposite Hoffman, for the role of the middle aged film star. LaBrava was due to start filming in Miami in August that year, but Hoffman was unhappy with the script and uneasy about plans to pair his character with an older woman. He worked on his own draft of the script with Murray Schisgal, while Ashby also started a version of his own. Hoffman also wanted a co-director credit with Ashby, but the Directors Guild would not allow it. In early March, Ashby was publicly unveiled as the film's director, but two weeks later Hoffman quit the project after Cannon Films published full-page ads using his name without his approval.

=== The Ginger Man ===
Around 1986, Ashby was attached to direct a film of J. P. Donleavy's The Ginger Man for Bluebird Films. The project was ready to enter production when Ashby suddenly died. Instead, Bluebird filmed another project in its place, Amazon, released in fall 1990.

=== Seven Silent Men ===
In 1987, Ashby worked briefly for producer Elliott Kastner on a screen version of Noel Behn's comic novel about a heist gone wrong, Seven Silent Men. Kastner approved Ashby's casting of Timothy Hutton for the lead, but when Al Pacino expressed an interest in the role, he told him to meet with the actor. Ashby declined to do so, and brought in Jerome Hellman as his new producer when he found out that Kastner had not actually bought the rights to the book.

=== The Ditto List ===
Also in 1987, Dustin Hoffman asked Ashby to adapt Stephen Greenleaf's 1985 book The Ditto List for his company Punch Productions. Hoffman would have starred in the film as divorce lawyer D. T. Jones, who dedicates his life to helping the women he represents. Within eight days, Ashby allegedly wrote a script that was described by his casting director Lynn Stalmaster as the best he had read in twenty years.

=== Wonderland Avenue ===
Ashby and producer Joseph H. Kanter discussed the possibilities of a film loosely based on Kanter's life but instead pursued the prospect of a film version of Wonderland Avenue, a then-unpublished memoir by Danny Sugerman. To support himself while developing the project, Ashby took on a job in fall 1987 directing the Beverly Hills Buntz pilot.

=== Vital Parts ===
In late 1987, producer Jerome Hellman proposed that he and Ashby make a film of Thomas Berger's novel Vital Parts. Ashby and Rick Padilla wrote a draft of the script before passing it to Robert C. Jones for rewriting. In the gap before Ashby was to start shooting Hand Carved Coffins, he met regularly with Hellman to discuss Vital Parts. Though Ashby originally wrote the script with Marlon Brando in mind, the actor later passed on it, and Danny DeVito and Gene Hackman both agreed to star instead. They planned to begin production after Hand Carved Coffins wrapped shooting in summer 1989.

Ashby's script was rediscovered by his friend Michael Dare to provide to the researchers of the 2018 documentary Hal. It has subsequently been shared publicly and is available to be read here.

=== She's De-Lovely ===
Ashby continued to work after being diagnosed with pancreatic cancer, and had tried to take over She's De-Lovely, a script written by John Cassavetes that Sean Penn wanted to make. Cassavetes had initially been set to direct, with Penn starring, but after Cassavetes became terminally ill, he had to pass the project on. However, due to Ashby's worsening condition, he was unable to realize this film as well. The script was eventually filmed in 1997, after significant changes, titled She's So Lovely, and directed by Cassavetes' son Nick.

== Bibliography ==
- Dawson, Nick (2009). Being Hal Ashby: The Life of a Hollywood Rebel. University Press of Kentucky. ISBN 9780813139197.
- Beach, Christopher (2009). The Films of Hal Ashby. Wayne State University Press. ISBN 9780814334157.
