= Jerome Hellman =

American film producer (1928–2021)

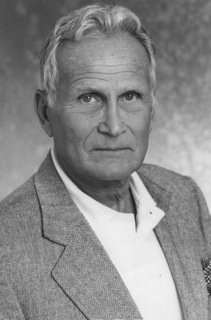
- Born: September 4, 1928; New York City, U.S.
- Died: May 26, 2021 (aged 92); Egremont, Massachusetts, U.S.
- Occupation: Film producer
- Known for: Midnight Cowboy; Coming Home
- Spouses: Joanne Fox (m. 1957–1966) Nancy Ellison (m. 1973–1991) Elizabeth Empleton (m. 2001)
- Children: 3

Jerome Hellman (September 4, 1928 – May 26, 2021) was an American film producer. He is best known for being the 42nd recipient of the Academy Award for Best Picture for Midnight Cowboy (1969). His 1978 film Coming Home was nominated for the same award.

== Life and career ==
Hellman was born to a Jewish family in New York City. He began his career as a talent agent starting with the Ashley/Steiner Agency and shortly set out on his own to form Jerome Hellman Associates, which represented some of the outstanding directors, writers and producers during the "golden age" of live television.

Hellman had his first taste of producing when he took over the role of Executive Producer from his client, President and Producer Worthington C. Miner, in the final days of Unit Four Productions, a partnership of George Roy Hill, Franklin Shaffner and Fielder Cook, producing live one-hour dramas on NBC (1955–57). After leaving NBC, Hill, Shaffner and Cook moved on to directing assignments at Playhouse 90, the first 90-minute TV drama series out of CBS's new studio on the West Coast.

In 1959, Hellman dissolved his talent agency and turned to producing motion pictures exclusively. He partnered with George Roy Hill and produced his first film, The World of Henry Orient (1964), with George Roy Hill directing, starring Peter Sellers (in his first film made in America), Angela Lansbury and Tom Bosley.

Over the next 25 years he produced six more feature films: A Fine Madness (1966) starring Sean Connery, Joanne Woodward and Jean Seberg; Midnight Cowboy (1969) starring Dustin Hoffman and Jon Voight; The Day of the Locust (1975) starring Donald Sutherland, Karen Black, Burgess Meredith and William Atherton; Coming Home (1978) starring Jane Fonda, Jon Voight and Bruce Dern; Promises in the Dark (1979), also directed by Hellman, starring Marsha Mason and Ned Beatty; and The Mosquito Coast (1986) starring Harrison Ford, Helen Mirren and River Phoenix.

His collaboration with director John Schlesinger and screenwriter Waldo Salt in the production of Midnight Cowboy garnered seven Academy Award nominations and won Academy Awards for Best Picture, Best Director and Best Screenplay. This creative team would last through The Day of the Locust and the early production stages of Coming Home.

Coming Home was directed by Hal Ashby and received eight Academy Award nominations including Best Picture. It won Academy Awards for Jon Voight (Best Actor), Jane Fonda (Best Actress), and Waldo Salt, Robert C. Jones and Nancy Dowd (Best Original Screenplay).

Hellman's seven feature films garnered seventeen Oscar nominations and won six.

In 1995 he was a member of the jury at the 19th Moscow International Film Festival.

Hellman had a stroke twelve years prior to his death. He died after a long illness at his home in South Egremont, Massachusetts on May 26, 2021, at age 92.

== Filmography ==
=== Producer ===
- The World of Henry Orient (1964)
- A Fine Madness (1966)
- Midnight Cowboy (1969)
- The Day of the Locust (1975)
- Coming Home (1978)
- Promises in the Dark (1979) also director
- The Mosquito Coast (1986)

=== Actor ===
- Being There (1979) - Gary Burns

== Awards and nominations ==
- Academy Award for Best Picture (1970), Midnight Cowboy (1969)
- Academy Award nomination for Best Picture (1979) Coming Home (1978)
