= Coming Home (1978 film) =

1978 film by Hal Ashby

- Theatrical release poster
- Directed by: Hal Ashby
- Screenplay by: Waldo Salt; Robert C. Jones
- Story by: Nancy Dowd
- Produced by: Jerome Hellman
- Starring: Jane Fonda; Jon Voight; Bruce Dern
- Cinematography: Haskell Wexler
- Edited by: Don Zimmerman
- Production companies: Jerome Hellman Productions; Jayne Productions Inc.
- Distributed by: United Artists
- Release date: February 15, 1978
- Running time: 128 minutes
- Country: United States
- Language: English
- Budget: $3 million
- Box office: $32.7 million

Coming Home is a 1978 American romantic war drama film directed by Hal Ashby from a screenplay written by Waldo Salt and Robert C. Jones with a story by Nancy Dowd. It stars Jane Fonda, Jon Voight, Bruce Dern, Penelope Milford, Robert Carradine and Robert Ginty. The film's narrative follows a perplexed woman, her Marine husband, and a paraplegic Vietnam War veteran with whom she develops a romantic relationship while her husband is deployed in Vietnam.

Coming Home was theatrically released on February 15, 1978, to critical and commercial success. Reviewers praised its direction, screenplay, and performances, while the film grossed $36 million worldwide against its $3 million budget, becoming the 15th highest-grossing film of 1978. It also premiered at the 1978 Cannes Film Festival, where it competed for the Palme d'Or, with Voight winning the Best Actor Prize.

The film received various awards and nominations. At the 36th Golden Globe Awards, it received six nominations including for the Best Motion Picture – Drama, with Voight and Fonda winning Best Actor and Best Actress. At the 51st Academy Awards, it received eight nominations including for the Best Picture, winning three; Best Original Screenplay, with Voight and Fonda winning Best Actor and Best Actress.

== Plot ==
In 1968 California, Sally, a loyal and conservative military wife, is married to Bob Hyde, a captain in the United States Marine Corps, who is about to be deployed to Vietnam. As a dedicated military officer, Bob sees the deployment primarily as an opportunity for career progress. At first, Sally dreads being left alone, but after a while, she feels liberated. Forced to find housing away from the base, she moves into a new apartment by the beach and buys a sports car. With nothing else to do, she decides to volunteer at a local Veterans Administration (VA) hospital, partially inspired by her bohemian friend Vi Munson, whose brother Bill has come home with grave emotional problems after just two weeks in Vietnam and now resides in the VA hospital.

At the hospital, Sally meets Luke Martin, a former high-school classmate. Like his friend Bill, Luke had gone to Vietnam but came back wounded. He is recuperating at the hospital from the injuries he sustained, which left him a paraplegic. Filled with pain, anger, and frustration, Luke is now opposed to the war. He is at first a bitter young man, but as he is increasingly thrown into contact with Sally, a relationship develops. Eventually, Luke is released from the hospital, and, newly mobile with his own wheelchair, begins to rebuild his life. His relationship with Sally deepens. She is also transformed by him, and her outlook on life starts to change. They have happy times, play at the beach, and fall in love. Meanwhile, Bill, traumatized by his experiences at war, commits suicide by injecting air into his veins. Driven by Bill's suicide, Luke chains himself to the gates of a local recruitment center in a vain attempt to stop others from enlisting.

Sally and Luke eventually make love, confronting his handicap, with Sally experiencing her first orgasm. However, she does not seek a divorce from her husband, and both she and Luke know that their relationship will have to end when Bob returns home. Bob returns, too soon, claiming that he had accidentally wounded himself in the leg. He is also suffering from post-traumatic stress disorder stemming from what he has seen in combat. Bob discovers Sally's affair from Army Intelligence, who has been spying on Luke, and Sally and Luke agree that Sally should try to patch things up with Bob. Bob loses control, confronting the lovers with a loaded rifle, but ultimately turns away. Bob places his neatly folded Marine dress uniform on the beach, takes off his wedding ring, and swims naked out into the ocean to commit suicide.

== Cast ==
- Jane Fonda as Sally Bender Hyde
- Jon Voight as Luke Martin
- Bruce Dern as Captain Bob Hyde
- Penelope Milford as Vi Munson
- Robert Carradine as Bill Munson
- Robert Ginty as Sergeant Dink Mobley
- Mary Gregory as Martha Vickery
- Kathleen Miller as Kathy Delise
- Beeson Carroll as Captain Earl Delise
- Willie Tyler as Virgil
- Lou Carello as Bozo
- Charles Cyphers as Pee Wee
- Olivia Cole as Corrine
- Tresa Hughes as Nurse Degroot
- Bruce French as Dr. Lincoln
- Mary Jackson as Fleta Wilson
- Tim Pelt as Jason
- Richard Lawson as Pat
- Rita Taggart as Johnson
- Claudie Watson as Bridges
- Sally Frei as Connie
- Tony Santoro as Porsche salesman
- Pat Corley as Harris
- Gwen Van Dam as Mrs. Harris
- Jim Klein as Willie Malone
- Tokyo Ernie as Tokyo Ernie
- Raul Bayardo as mechanic in wheelchair
- Stacey Pickren as Sophie
- James Kindelon and Joey Faustine as Marines at gate
- Arthur Rosenberg as Bruce
- David Clennon as Tim
- Kimberly Binion as waitress go-go
- Kirk Raymond, Bill Hale as surveillance men
- Danny Tucker as Monty
- Ned Van Zandt, Dennis Rucker, Jonathan Banks, James Richardson as Marines at party
- Gary Downey as intelligence officer
- George Roberts, Bob Ott as FBI agents
- Gary Lee Davis as Marine recruiter
- Marc McClure as high school class president

== Production ==
Coming Home was conceived by Jane Fonda as the first feature for her own production company, IPC Films (for the Indochina Peace Campaign), with her associate producer Bruce Gilbert, a friend from her protest days. Fonda wished to make a film about the Vietnam War inspired by her friendship with Ron Kovic, a paraplegic Vietnam War veteran, whom she had met at an antiwar rally. At that time, Kovic had recently completed his autobiographical book Born on the Fourth of July, which later became an Oscar-winning motion picture of the same name directed by Oliver Stone, starring Tom Cruise as Kovic.

In 1972, Fonda hired Nancy Dowd, a friend from her days in the feminist movement, to write a script about the consequences of the war as seen through the eyes of a military wife. Originally, Dowd's story, tentatively titled Buffalo Ghosts, focused on two women, volunteers at a veterans' hospital, who must come to grips with the emotional toll that the war takes on its casualties and their families. The project dragged on for years until Gilbert and producer Jerome Hellman took it. The screenplay was reshaped significantly by the circle of talent who eventually brought it to the screen: Fonda, Ashby, Wexler, Jon Voight, producer Hellman and screenwriters Waldo Salt and Robert C. Jones. They were united by their opposition to the Vietnam War and by their concern for the veterans who were returning to America and facing difficulties adapting to life back home. Rudy Wurlitzer contributed uncredited work to the script. (Note: Novelist George Davis sued the filmmakers in federal court, alleging they had infringed the copyright of his 1971 debut, a Vietnam War novel also called Coming Home. In 1982 the case was decided in the defendants' favor, with the court finding that beyond the shared titles and the war as a backdrop to the story, the two had no substantial similarity a jury could reasonably be expected to find (Davis's novel, most significantly, takes place in Thailand where its three main characters, two of whom are black, are Air Force pilots).)

John Schlesinger, who had worked with producers Hellman and Voight on Midnight Cowboy, was originally named the director, but he left the project after feeling uncomfortable with the subject matter. The script was then passed to Michael Cimino, who at the time was interested in making another film about Vietnam. He declined, however, as he felt it was "bad fiction", which imposed a political idea rather than the truth of the stories of returning veterans. According to Cimino, Fonda changed the original ending:

"What was shot was Jane's ending — she was a pacifist and had to find a way for guilt to kill the character. In the original ending, Bruce Dern's character got himself a heavy machine gun, in a moment of madness went into the L.A. freeway, five lanes of traffic in both directions, and started shooting away, destroying everything in sight, an inferno. And she turned it into a Norman Maine complex, 'oh my God I'm so guilty for what I did in Vietnam that I'm going to kill myself by going in the sea'."

Hal Ashby was next sent the script, who agreed to direct the film. Fonda was cast from the beginning as Sally Hyde, the housewife. A top box-office star was sought for the male lead to offset the grim nature of the story. Al Pacino, Jack Nicholson and Sylvester Stallone were all offered the part, but declined. Jon Voight had been considered for the role of the husband, but after becoming involved with the film, he campaigned to play the paraplegic veteran. Voight had participated in the anti-war movement and was a friend of Fonda, who was instrumental in helping him land the role, even though he had fallen from popularity since his Midnight Cowboy heyday. Bruce Dern, long stereotyped in sadistic roles, was chosen as the husband. The screenplay was written and rewritten until the project could wait no longer. Jane Fonda, who just finished Julia (1977), was soon to star in Alan J. Pakula's Comes a Horseman (1978). For director Ashby, this was his second film about the 1960s, in addition to his 1975 film Shampoo.

Ashby had cast singer-songwriter Guthrie Thomas to portray the role of Bill Munson after reviewing Thomas' screen test. Thomas joined his close friend Ashby and the entire cast at a restaurant by Malibu Beach before the start of production. Thomas had been previously cast in a previous Ashby film, Bound for Glory, starring David Carradine. Upon completion of the cast meeting, Thomas privately spoke with Ashby and told him, "Hal, I am a singer-songwriter as you know, and not an actor. In all fairness to you and this amazing cast, you need an extremely talented actor for this role and not a poor singer. I recommend either Bobby Carradine or Keith Carradine." Robert Carradine was cast and portrayed the role of Bill Munson.

== Soundtrack ==
- The Beatles: Hey Jude, Strawberry Fields Forever; (EMI Records Inc.)
- Big Brother and the Holding Company Featuring Janis Joplin: Call On Me; (Columbia Records)
- Tim Buckley: Once I Was; (Elektra Records)
- Buffalo Springfield: Expecting to Fly, For What It's Worth; (Atlantic Records)
- The Chambers Brothers: Time Has Come Today; (Columbia Records)
- Bob Dylan: Just Like a Woman; (Columbia Records)
- Aretha Franklin: Save Me; (Atlantic Recording Corporation)
- Richie Havens: Follow; (M&M Records Inc.)
- Jimi Hendrix: Manic Depression; (Warner Bros. Records)
- Jefferson Airplane: White Rabbit; (RCA Records)
- The Rolling Stones: Out of Time, No Expectations, Jumpin' Jack Flash, My Girl, Ruby Tuesday, Sympathy for the Devil (ABKCO Records Inc.)
- Simon & Garfunkel: Bookends; (Columbia Records)
- Steppenwolf: Born to Be Wild; (ABC Records Inc.)

== Reception ==
Coming Home premiered at the 1978 Cannes Film Festival, where Voight won the award for Best Actor for his performance.

The film was released in the U.S. in February 1978. It proved popular with audiences and received generally good reviews. Charles Champlin of the Los Angeles Times commented that: "Despite an over-explicit soundtrack and some moments when the story in fact became a sermon, the movie effectively translated a changed national consciousness into credible and touching personal terms." The Toronto Sun called the film "The Best Years of Our Lives c. 1978 with the same high standards and the same lofty morals of an earlier era."

On review aggregator website Rotten Tomatoes, the film has an approval rating of 83% based on 30 reviews, with a rating average of 7.4/10. The website's critical consensus reads: "Coming Home's stellar cast elevates the love triangle in the center of its story - and adds a necessary human component to its none-too-subtle political message." Metacritic, which uses a weighted average, assigned the film a score of 61 out of 100, based on 9 critics, indicating "generally favorable" reviews.

The New York Times placed the film on its Best 1000 Movies Ever list.

The February 2020 issue of New York Magazine lists Coming Home as among "The Best Movies That Lost Best Picture at the Oscars."

== Awards and nominations ==
Award	Category	Nominee(s)	Result	Ref.
Academy Awards	Best Picture	Jerome Hellman	Nominated	
Academy Awards	Best Director	Hal Ashby	Nominated	
Academy Awards	Best Actor	Jon Voight	Won	
Academy Awards	Best Actress	Jane Fonda	Won	
Academy Awards	Best Supporting Actor	Bruce Dern	Nominated	
Academy Awards	Best Supporting Actress	Penelope Milford	Nominated	
Academy Awards	Best Screenplay – Written Directly for the Screen	Screenplay by Waldo Salt and Robert C. Jones; Story by Nancy Dowd	Won	
Academy Awards	Best Film Editing	Don Zimmerman	Nominated	
Cannes Film Festival	Palme d'Or	Hal Ashby	Nominated	
Cannes Film Festival	Best Actor	Jon Voight	Won	
Directors Guild of America Awards	Outstanding Directorial Achievement in Motion Pictures	Hal Ashby	Nominated	
Golden Globe Awards	Best Motion Picture – Drama		Nominated	
Golden Globe Awards	Best Actor in a Motion Picture – Drama	Jon Voight	Won	
Golden Globe Awards	Best Actress in a Motion Picture – Drama	Jane Fonda	Won	
Golden Globe Awards	Best Supporting Actor – Motion Picture	Bruce Dern	Nominated	
Golden Globe Awards	Best Director – Motion Picture	Hal Ashby	Nominated	
Golden Globe Awards	Best Screenplay – Motion Picture	Waldo Salt and Robert C. Jones	Nominated	
Jupiter Awards	Best International Actress	Jane Fonda	Nominated	
Los Angeles Film Critics Association Awards	Best Film		Won	
Los Angeles Film Critics Association Awards	Best Actor	Jon Voight	Won	
Los Angeles Film Critics Association Awards	Best Actress	Jane Fonda (also for California Suite and Comes a Horseman)	Won	
National Board of Review Awards	Top Ten Films		2nd Place	
National Board of Review Awards	Best Actor	Jon Voight	Won (Note: Tied with Laurence Olivier for The Boys from Brazil.)	
National Society of Film Critics Awards	Best Actor	Jon Voight	2nd Place	
National Society of Film Critics Awards	Best Actress	Jane Fonda	2nd Place	
New York Film Critics Circle Awards	Best Actor	Jon Voight	Won	
New York Film Critics Circle Awards	Best Actress	Jane Fonda	Runner-up	
Writers Guild of America Awards	Best Drama – Written Directly for the Screen	Screenplay by Waldo Salt and Robert C. Jones; Story by Nancy Dowd	Won	

=== American Film Institute ===
- AFI's 100 Years...100 Passions – #78

== Bibliography ==
- Norden, Martin F. (1994). The Cinema of Isolation: A History of Physical Disability in the Movies. Rutgers University Press. ISBN 0-8135-2104-1.
- Peary, Danny (1993). Alternative Oscars. Delta. ISBN 0-385-30332-7.
- Wiley, Mason; Bona, Damien (1996). Inside Oscar: The Unofficial History of the Academy Awards. Ballantine Books. ISBN 0-345-40053-4.
