= The Fortune =

1975 film by Mike Nichols

- Theatrical release poster
- Directed by: Mike Nichols
- Written by: Carole Eastman; (credited as Adrien Joyce)
- Produced by: Don Devlin; Mike Nichols
- Starring: Warren Beatty; Jack Nicholson; Stockard Channing; Florence Stanley; Richard B. Shull; Tom Newman; John Fiedler; Scatman Crothers
- Cinematography: John A. Alonzo
- Edited by: Stu Linder
- Music by: José Padilla Sánchez; David Shire
- Distributed by: Columbia Pictures
- Release date: May 20, 1975
- Running time: 88 minutes
- Country: United States
- Language: English
- Budget: $3.5 million

The Fortune is a 1975 American black comedy film starring Jack Nicholson and Warren Beatty, and directed by Mike Nichols. The screenplay by Carole Eastman (credited under the pseudonym Adrien Joyce) focuses on two bumbling con men who plot to steal the fortune of a wealthy young heiress, played by Stockard Channing in her first film starring role.

== Plot ==
Nicky Wilson and Oscar Sullivan are inept 1920s scam artists in the Northeastern United States who see pay dirt in the guise of Fredericka Quintessa "Freddie" Bigard, the millionaire heiress to a sanitary napkin fortune. She loves the already married Nicky, but because the Mann Act prohibits him from taking her across state lines and engaging in immoral relations, he proposes that she marry Oscar and then carry on an affair with the man she wants. Oscar, who is wanted for embezzlement and anxious to get out of town, is happy to comply with the plan, although he intends to claim his spousal privileges after they are wed.

Once they reach Los Angeles, the men try everything they can to separate Freddie from her inheritance without success, but with sufficient determination to arouse her suspicions. When she announces her plan to donate her money to charity, Nicky and Oscar conclude that murder might be their only recourse if they're going to get rich quick. Eventually arrested for the murder, Nicky and Oscar confess everything to the Los Angeles Police Department. This leads to unusual complications when the arresting detective meets the very-alive Freddie, who passed out and was oblivious to the entire "murder", and is shocked to hear the story.

== Cast ==
- Jack Nicholson as Oscar Sullivan
- Warren Beatty as Nicky Wilson
- Stockard Channing as Fredrika Quintessa Bigard
- Florence Stanley as Mrs. Gould
- Richard B. Shull as Detective Sgt. Power
- John Fiedler as Police Photographer
- Scatman Crothers as Fisherman
- Kathryn Grody as Police Secretary
- Ian Wolfe as Justice of the Peace
- Dub Taylor as Rattlesnake Tom
- Christopher Guest as Boy Lover

== Production ==
When Warren Beatty was unable to stir interest in his and Robert Towne's screenplay for Shampoo about a befuddled but seductive hairdresser, which he had been developing since 1967, he bundled it with the more appealing The Fortune and convinced Columbia Pictures head David Begelman to finance both films. The fact that Carole Eastman, writing under the pen name Adrien Joyce, had yet to complete her 240-page script fazed Beatty less than it did director Mike Nichols, who needed a box-office hit after Catch-22 and The Day of the Dolphin, both of which were critical and commercial flops.

The working relation between the screenwriter and director was amiable until Eastman objected to the many cuts Nichols was making to the script and his determination to make it less satirical and more slapstick, and she was fired from the production.

Nichols wanted Bette Midler to portray Freddie, but he changed his mind when, seemingly unaware of his career, Midler insulted him by asking what films he previously made. He ultimately cast relative newcomer Stockard Channing, whose credits were limited to a few television appearances and a minor role in the Barbra Streisand film Up the Sandbox.

Because the start of principal photography on One Flew Over the Cuckoo's Nest was delayed, Jack Nicholson, who had worked with Nichols on Carnal Knowledge, was available for the role of Oscar Sullivan. During filming, the actor was forced to deal with two events that impacted his personal life. First, a fact checker working on a biographical piece for Time discovered that the woman Nicholson believed was his sister was actually his mother, and the woman who raised him was his grandmother. Then his close friend Cass Elliot died in her sleep, and rumors about the cause of her death circulated in the media. These two events, linked with the film's eventual failure, made The Fortune a subject that Nicholson never discussed in interviews and biographies.

The film was shot on location in Albuquerque, New Mexico, and on a segment of street constructed in the corner of the former RKO Forty Acres back lot where the "Stalag 13" sets for TV's Hogan's Heroes were located. The apartment building was a The Day of the Locust set. Nichols did not direct another film for seven years.

== Reception ==
=== Critical reception ===
Vincent Canby of The New York Times called the film "very funny", "manically scatterbrained", and "a marvelous attempt to recreate a kind of farce that, with the notable exceptions of a handful of films by Blake Edwards and Billy Wilder, disappeared after World War II." He added "The Fortune does have sequences that sag, and there are moments when it's obvious that farce is not exactly the native art of any of the people involved. One occasionally is aware of the tremendous effort that has gone into a particular effect, though that doesn't spoil it for me. The endeavor is nobly conceived in an era that has just about abandoned farce in favor of parody, satire, situation and/or wise-crack comedy, all of which Mr. Nichols already can do with – perhaps – too great an ease. The Fortune will probably be compared to The Sting, because of the overlapping of the eras and the con-man theme. Incorrectly, though. The Sting is an adventure. The Fortune is farce of a rare order."

Time Out London stated:

[The film] starts promisingly as a sardonic comedy...but once in California lethargy settles in. The film becomes almost static, a series of stagy, glossy tableaux: such lack of momentum may be an adequate assessment of the characters' limited capacity for development, but it has a disastrous effect on the film's pacing. Events degenerate into miscalculated farce and underline Nichols' continuing slick superficiality. Adrien Joyce's much hacked-about script sounds as though it was once excellent: a pity everyone treats it so off-handedly.

TV Guide rated it four stars, calling it "an offbeat but often hilarious comedy" and adding, the film "works well through the fine performances of the leads and the superb timing of director Nichols." It concluded, "Full of period and period-sounding music, The Fortune is cold to the core – agreeably disagreeable amusement."

On the review aggregator website Rotten Tomatoes, 40% of 15 critics' reviews are positive, with an average rating of 5.2/10.

=== Awards ===
Stockard Channing was nominated for the Golden Globe Award for New Star of the Year – Actress.
