= Charles K. Eastman =

American screenwriter

Charles Eastman
- Born: Charles Kemper Eastman; September 18, 1929; Los Angeles, California
- Died: July 3, 2009 (aged 79); Culver City, California
- Occupations: Screenwriter, Director
- Relatives: Carole Eastman
- Writing career
- Language: English
- Period: 1950s – 2009
- Notable work: Little Fauss and Big Halsy
- Notable awards: Best Screenplay of the Year (1970), Esquire; O. Henry Award (1993)

Charles Kemper Eastman (September 18, 1929 – July 3, 2009) was an American screenwriter and script doctor. He wrote the screenplay for the 1970 film Little Fauss and Big Halsy; he wrote and directed The All-American Boy. Charles Eastman died from complications of heart disease in Culver City, California on July 3, 2009.

== Early life ==
Eastman was born in Los Angeles, California, into a working-class family employed in motion pictures. His father worked at Warner Bros. as a grip, and his mother was a longtime secretary for Bing Crosby. Eastman's sister Carole also became a screenwriter. Eastman's uncle was a film cameraman.

== Career and works ==
Eastman began his career working in the Crosby office and appears as a prominent extra in many Bing Crosby films. He was working in the script department at CBS in the 1950s and had written several plays that found a place in Los Angeles theatre, including La Peregrina, Victorey, The Root of the Iceplant, and The Hamster of Happiness. The Hamster of Happiness became a screenplay produced at NBC as an Experiment in Television, with Susan Tyrrell and Mildred Dunnock, and later a motion picture at Lorimar under the title Second-Hand Hearts, directed by Hal Ashby.

Eastman was a "gifted and eccentric" writer, according to the Los Angeles Times, who turned down option offers on his screenplays during the 1960s unless he could direct them himself. He is considered one of Hollywood's most accomplished script doctors; examples of this uncredited work include Otto Preminger's Bunny Lake Is Missing as well as The Loved One, The Cincinnati Kid, The Americanization of Emily, This Property Is Condemned, Who'll Stop the Rain, The Planet of the Apes and Heaven Can Wait.

Eastman's screenplay Little Fauss and Big Halsy was produced at Paramount, directed by Sidney J. Furie and released in 1970. He shared Esquire magazine's Best Screenplay of the Year award with Bertolucci's The Spider's Stratagem. Robert Redford, the movie's star, said of the film, "That was the best screenplay of any film I've ever done, in my opinion. It was without a doubt the most interesting, the funniest, the saddest, the most real and original."

Eastman wrote and directed The All American Boy for Warner Bros., starring Jon Voight. It was Eastman's only directing credit.

Robert Towne, the screenwriter of Chinatown, cited Eastman as an early influence on his work: "Chuck Eastman—Adrian Joyce's brother—wrote Honeybear, I Think I Love You, a very influential screenplay in the fifties that never got made that affected me strongly because there was a guy who was able to use life around him and push as far as anybody writing a novel was going to push." He later elaborated, "For me, it was quite a revelation because it was the first contemporary screenplay I had read that just opened up the possibilities of everything that you could put into a screenplay in terms of language and the observations of contemporary life".

Little Fauss and Big Halsy and The All American Boy were among the first screenplays to be published in hardback by Farrar, Straus, and Giroux.

Other original screenplays by Eastman include April 17, 1961, The Hundredth Monkey, Cowboy Christmas, and Kazhiamira and the Night Guys. He adapted the stories of Desperadoes and Boomer. Other produced plays he wrote include The Un-American Cowboy, Busy Bee Good Food All Night Delicious, and Borders.

Eastman's short story "Yellow Flags" was published in The Atlantic and later anthologized in the 1993 O. Henry Prize Stories collection.

Eastman's photo collection comprising over 50 years of screenplay research and celebrity photos is available through Getty Images. In February 2009, People magazine and Hello! UK published his May 1977 picture of a 23-month-old Angelina Jolie.
