= Craig Hayes (disambiguation) =

Craig Hayes is a special effects artist.

Craig Hayes may also refer to:

- Craig Hayes (actor), see Solo Trans
- Craig Hayes-film editor, see Leonie (film)
