= Kathleen Miller (actress) =

American actress (1945–2016)

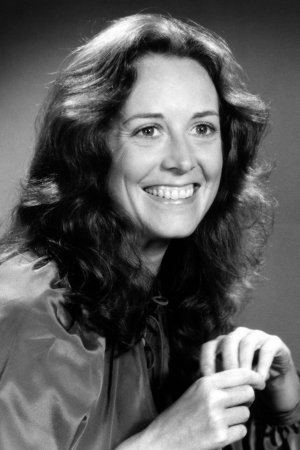
- Miller in 1976
- Born: July 1, 1945; Los Angeles, California, U.S.
- Died: October 7, 2016 (aged 71); Lynwood, California, U.S.
- Occupation: Actress
- Years active: 1969–1986

Kathleen Miller (July 1, 1945 – October 7, 2016) was an American actress who gained fame for her appearances in several films directed by Hal Ashby. She also had a lead role on the television series Sirota's Court from 1976 to 1977.

== Biography ==
Miller was born in Los Angeles, the daughter of Aaron Miller, an executive at Paramount Pictures, and Carolyn, an actress. She was a childhood friend of Candice Bergen. After appearing in stage productions in New York City (including a 1969 Broadway production of Butterflies Are Free) and an episode of Kojak, she was cast in The Last Detail (1973) by director Hal Ashby, playing a prostitute. Ashby subsequently cast her in Shampoo (1975), in which she portrayed a client of George Roundy (Warren Beatty). From 1976 to 1977, she starred as Gail Goodman on the short-lived series Sirota's Court.

In 1975, she had a large guest-starring role in the Starsky & Hutch episode "Death Ride" as an undercover police woman named Joanne pretending to be the daughter of a mobster. In 1976, she also starred as the daughter of Peter Fonda's character in Fighting Mad, a drama about an Arkansas farmer waging war on land developers. Her last film with Ashby was Coming Home (1978), a Vietnam-based war drama starring Jane Fonda, Jon Voight, and Bruce Dern.

== Death ==
Miller died in Lynwood, California after a protracted illness.

== Filmography ==
=== Film ===
Year	Title	Role	Director	Notes	Ref.
1969	Franchette: Les Intrigues	Kathy	Don Walters		
1973	The Last Detail	Annette	Hal Ashby		
1974	The Chinese Prime Minister	Roxane	Brian Murray; George Turpin		
1975	Shampoo	Anjanette	Hal Ashby		
1975	Strange New World	Dr. Allison Crowley	Robert Butler		
1976	Stay Hungry	Dorothy Stephens	Bob Rafelson		
1976	Fighting Mad	Carolee Hunter	Jonathan Demme		
1978	Coming Home	Kathy Delise	Hal Ashby		

=== Television ===
Year	Title	Role	Notes	Ref.
1973	Kojak	Fern	Episode: "Girl in the River"	
1974	Cannon	Julia Danver	Episode: "Blood Money"	
1974	Paul Sand in Friends and Lovers	Sally	Episode: "Getting to First Bass"	
1975	Starsky & Hutch	Joanne Mello / Linda Williams	Episode: "Death Ride"	
1976–1977	Sirota's Court	Gail Goodman	13 episodes	

== Stage credits ==
Year	Title	Role	Notes	Ref.
1969	Butterflies Are Free	Jill Tanner	Booth Theatre	
1972	The Little Black Book	Woman	Helen Hayes Theater	

== Sources ==
- Dawson, Nick (2009). Being Hal Ashby: Life of a Hollywood Rebel. Lexington, Kentucky: University Press of Kentucky. ISBN 978-0-813-17334-4.
