= Little Fauss and Big Halsy =

1970 film by Sidney J. Furie

- Theatrical release poster
- Directed by: Sidney J. Furie
- Written by: Charles K. Eastman
- Produced by: Albert S. Ruddy
- Starring: Robert Redford; Michael J. Pollard; Lauren Hutton; Noah Beery; Lucille Benson
- Cinematography: Ralph Woolsey
- Edited by: Argyle Nelson, Jr.
- Production company: Alfran Productions
- Distributed by: Paramount Pictures
- Release date: October 21, 1970
- Running time: 100 minutes
- Country: United States
- Language: English
- Budget: $2.5 million

Little Fauss and Big Halsy is a 1970 American comedy-drama film directed by Sidney J. Furie, starring Robert Redford and Michael J. Pollard, also featuring Lauren Hutton, Noah Beery, Jr. and Lucille Benson.

The film concerns the exploits of two motorcycle riders. It is one of Redford's relatively unsuccessful films and is therefore less known than his other works. Johnny Cash contributed the title song and other parts of the soundtrack, which also features both Carl Perkins and Bob Dylan. The title song, "The Ballad of Little Fauss and Big Halsy", written by Perkins, was nominated for a Golden Globe Award for Best Original Song.

The main characters are the inept, unsuspecting Little Fauss (Pollard), and the opportunistic, womanizing Halsy Knox (Redford). Hutton played the supporting role of Rita Nebraska, a role originally offered to Grace Slick.

== Plot ==
Halsy Knox, a professional dirt bike racer, runs into Little Fauss, an amateur racer, after a race held near Phoenix, Arizona. They strike up a friendship as Fauss is attracted to Halsy's carefree lifestyle. However, Fauss's father regards Halsy as a bad influence on his son and refuses to help Halsy when his truck breaks down. When Halsy arrives later at the motorcycle repair shop where Fauss is employed, he tricks the admiring Fauss into repairing his motorcycle for free.

When Fauss breaks his leg in a desert race, Halsy, who has been barred from racing due to drinking at the track, proposes that they form a partnership in which Halsy would race under Fauss's name with Fauss serving as the mechanic. Fauss joins Halsy on the motorcycle racing circuit despite his parents' disapproval. Fauss is constantly confronted with his inferiority to Halsy, both on and off the racetrack.

Their partnership is finally broken when Rita Nebraska, a drop-out from a wealthy background, arrives at the racetrack and immediately attaches herself to Halsy, despite the attention Fauss pays her. Fauss returns home to his parents to find his father has died. Several months later, Halsy visits him and attempts to ditch Rita, who is now pregnant. Fauss, however, refuses to take her. He informs Halsy that he plans to reenter the racing circuit.

The two men race against each other a short time later at the Sears Point International Raceway, where Fauss tells Halsy that he has been drafted. Halsy's motorcycle breaks down. As he leaves the track, he hears the announcement that Fauss has taken the lead.

== Cast ==
- Robert Redford - Halsy Knox
- Michael J. Pollard - Little Fauss
- Lauren Hutton - Rita Nebraska
- Noah Beery, Jr. - Seally Fauss (billed as Noah Beery)
- Lucille Benson - Mom Fauss
- Ray Ballard - Photographer
- Linda Gaye Scott - Moneth
- Erin O'Reilly - Sylvene McFall
- Ben Archibek - Rick Nifty (billed as Benjamin Archibek)
- Sharmagne Leland-St. John Marci

== Soundtrack album ==
A soundtrack album was released in 1971 on Columbia Records, produced by Bob Johnston and featuring the songs by Johnny Cash and Carl Perkins featured in the film.

== Production ==
After Robert Redford dropped out of Blue (1968), Paramount sued him for violating his three-picture deal; the lawsuit was dropped in his agreement to play Halsy in May 1969. Michael J. Pollard was cast as Fauss the following month and was paid $175,000 for the role. Barbara Hershey and James Victor were also considered for roles in the film.

Principal photography began on June 16, 1969, in Phoenix, Arizona. Filming moved to Antelope Valley and Palo Alto, California in August, with Redford commuting between the set and the studio's soundstages in Hollywood to finish filming scenes for Downhill Racer (1969). Filming completed in mid-September.

== Release ==
Little Fauss and Big Halsy premiered at in New York City on October 21, 1970, and began an exclusive engagement one week later at the National Theatre in Westwood, California.

The review aggregation website Rotten Tomatoes reports an approval rating of 33% based on six reviews, with an average rating of 4.8/10.

== See also ==
- List of American films of 1970
