= Man Trouble =

1992 film by Bob Rafelson

- Theatrical release poster
- Directed by: Bob Rafelson
- Written by: Carole Eastman
- Produced by: Vittorio Cecchi Gori; Carole Eastman; Bruce Gilbert
- Starring: Jack Nicholson; Ellen Barkin; Harry Dean Stanton; Beverly D'Angelo; Michael McKean; Saul Rubinek; Veronica Cartwright
- Cinematography: Stephen H. Burum
- Edited by: William Steinkamp
- Music by: Georges Delerue
- Production company: Penta Pictures
- Distributed by: 20th Century Fox
- Release date: 17 July 1992
- Running time: 100 minutes
- Country: United States
- Language: English
- Budget: $30 million
- Box office: $4,096,030

Man Trouble is a 1992 American romantic black comedy film starring Jack Nicholson and Ellen Barkin. It was directed by Bob Rafelson and written by Carole Eastman, who together had been responsible for 1970's Five Easy Pieces.

The film is the fifth collaboration between Nicholson and Rafelson. Beverly D'Angelo and Harry Dean Stanton co-star.

== Plot ==
Harry Bliss runs a guard dog service and is going through counseling with his wife Adele. A serial killer is on the loose in Los Angeles, so when the apartment of classical singer Joan Spruance is ransacked and she starts receiving threatening phone messages, Joan moves into the Hollywood Hills home of her sister Andy Ellerman. Joan does not feel safe at Andy's home because she is harassed by Andy's ex-lovers. She hires a guard dog from Harry's company and Harry is soon providing more than protection for the beautiful singer.

Harry is a natural-born liar who, because of his profession, feels that he lives by a code of honor – even if he cannot quite explain it – as one thing after another spins out of his control. Joan is soft and vulnerable as she is badgered by her conductor husband Lewie Duart, harassed by unknown callers, menaced by men from Andy's past and "helped" by Harry.

== Cast ==
- Jack Nicholson as Harry Bliss
- Ellen Barkin as Joan Spruance
- Harry Dean Stanton as Redmond Layls
- Beverly D'Angelo as Andy Ellerman
- Michael McKean as Eddy Revere
- Saul Rubinek as Laurence Moncreif
- Paul Mazursky as Lee MacGreevy
- Lauren Tom as Adele Bliss
- Viveka Davis as June Huff
- Veronica Cartwright as Helen Dextra
- David Clennon as Lewie Duart
- John Kapelos as Detective Melvenos
- Gary Graham as Butch Gable
- Raymond Cruz as Balco

== Reception ==
=== Critical response ===
Man Trouble was not well received by the majority of critics. It holds a 7% rating on Rotten Tomatoes based on 30 reviews. The consensus summarizes: "Man Trouble has brilliant stars and the germ of an interesting idea in its favor, which makes the scattered, unfunny results even more of a disappointment." Audiences surveyed by CinemaScore gave the film a grade of "C" on scale of A+ to F.

The New York Times review said "Not much about Man Trouble, a sad mess of a romantic comedy directed by Bob Rafelson, written by Carole Eastman and starring Jack Nicholson, suggests that these three collaborated on one of the most haunting and representative films of another day." Variety's review said that "Jack Nicholson fans should feel cheated by Man Trouble, an insultingly trivial star vehicle. After some initial business attracted by his name on the marquee, film is fated for pay-cable use."

Reviewing the film for the Los Angeles Times, Michael Wilmington wrote, "It's certainly not the catastrophe that early press reports have suggested--the studio, rather absurdly, refused to screen Man Trouble for critics--but it is disappointing. Not because it's bad, but because we expect more from a Nicholson-Rafelson-Eastman collaboration. We expect savage wit, clear takes on society, pungent dialogue, rich characters." He added, "This cutesy tale has no urgency", but did praise Nicholson and Barkin's performances.

According to Time Out magazine: "The trouble is, the film never seems to know where it's headed. Not quite a romance, a thriller or a comedy, it's a movie with an on-going identity crisis. Barkin, playing against type, produces a shrill caricature of femininity, while Rafelson indulges Nicholson's familiar soft-spoken laxity, another of his personable rogues."

Jack Nicholson earned a nomination for the Golden Raspberry Award for Worst Actor for his performances in both this film and Hoffa, but lost the trophy to Sylvester Stallone for Stop! Or My Mom Will Shoot at the 13th Golden Raspberry Awards.

=== Box office ===
The film opened in 1,004 theatres and grossed $2,034,475 in its opening weekend. It grossed 67% less the following weekend and was pulled from theatres shortly thereafter with a gross of only $4 million.

With a budget of $30 million, including almost $8 million paid to Nicholson, the film made a loss for Pentamerica, their second consecutive box-office bomb after Folks!. Fox expected to recover their $8 million marketing expenses.
