= The All-American Boy (film) =

1973 film by Charles Eastman

- Theatrical release poster
- Directed by: Charles Eastman
- Written by: Charles Eastman
- Produced by: Joseph T. Naar; Saul Krugman
- Starring: Jon Voight; E. J. Peaker
- Cinematography: Philip H. Lathrop
- Edited by: Christopher Holmes; William Neel; Ralph E. Winters
- Production company: Warner Bros.
- Distributed by: Warner Bros.
- Release date: October 24, 1973
- Running time: 118 minutes
- Country: United States
- Language: English

The All-American Boy is a 1973 American drama film written and directed by Charles Eastman. The film stars Jon Voight, E. J. Peaker, Nancie Phillips, Art Metrano, Kathy Mahoney, Carole Androsky and Jeanne Cooper. The film was released by Warner Bros. on October 24, 1973.

== Plot ==
Vic Bealer, a young boxer from a small town in Texas known by his ring name "The Bomber," seems to be on his way to big things, remaining undefeated as an amateur with a possibility of making the U.S. Olympic boxing team.

Without any explanation, Vic walks away from everything, including his family, fiancée, and his fighting career. Disaffected and disillusioned, he enters into relationships with small-town girls Janelle and Drenna, leaving trainer Arty to wonder if The Bomber will ever return.

== Cast ==
- Jon Voight as Vic Bealer
- Nancie Phillips as Connie Swooze
- Art Metrano as Jay David Swooze
- Kathy Mahoney as Shereen Bealer
- Carole Androsky as Rodine Bealer
- Jeanne Cooper as Nola Bealer
- Peggy Cowles as Bett Van Daumee
- Bob Hastings as Ariel Van Daumee
- E. J. Peaker as Janelle Sharkey
- Ned Glass as Arty Bale
- Ray Ballard as Ring Announcer
- Anne Archer as Drenna Valentine
- Ron Burns as Larking
- Harry Northup as Parker
- Rosalind Cash as Poppy
- Gene Borkan as Rockoff
- Leigh French as Lovette
- Jeff Thompson as High Valentine
- Mac Chandler as Saragusa
- Owen Harian as Knipchild
- Jaye P. Morgan as Magda Valentine

== See also ==
- List of American films of 1973
- List of boxing films
