= Second-Hand Hearts =

1981 film by Hal Ashby

- Theatrical release poster
- Directed by: Hal Ashby
- Written by: Charles Eastman
- Produced by: James William Guercio; Charles Mulvehill
- Starring: Robert Blake; Barbara Harris; Bert Remsen
- Cinematography: Haskell Wexler
- Edited by: Amy Holden Jones
- Music by: Willis Alan Ramsey
- Production company: Lorimar
- Distributed by: Paramount Pictures
- Release date: May 8, 1981
- Running time: 102 minutes
- Country: United States
- Language: English
- Budget: $7 million
- Box office: $19,450

Second-Hand Hearts is a 1981 American comedy film directed by Hal Ashby from a screenplay by Charles Eastman. A shorter version of this screenplay, under its original intended title The Hamster of Happiness, was written by Eastman for the unconventional NBC anthology series NBC Experiment in Television, which was broadcast in 1968 with Mildred Dunnock and Susan Tyrrell in the cast. It was the second of three films Ashby directed which were produced by Lorimar Productions.

== Plot ==
Dinette Dusty, a manic, mercurial widow separated from her three children, and Loyal Muke, an insecure loner who inadvertently marries her after the two of them go on a drunken bender. After losing his job soon after their marriage, she badgers him into taking her to recover her children, currently in the custody of her less-than-accommodating in-laws, and taking them all to California in the hope of a better life for them all. The film follows the unusual incidents that occur along the road trip.

== Cast ==
- Robert Blake as Loyal Muke
- Barbara Harris as Dinette Dusty
- Bert Remsen as Voyd
- Collin Boone as Human Dusty
- Amber Rose Gold as Iota
- Jessica & Erica Stansbury as Sandra Dee
- Shirley Stoler as Maxy
- Woodrow Chambliss as Deaf Attendant

== Production and release ==
The filming was plagued by trouble throughout production, much stemming from the erratic behavior of Ashby and writer Eastman. Although it was filmed in 1979, it was not released until 1981, and Paramount Pictures, at the time serving as Lorimar's theatrical distributor, chose to only open the film in New York and Los Angeles. This prompted Robert Blake, during one of his frequent guest appearances on The Tonight Show with Johnny Carson, to publicly complain about this decision; he presented a clip and tried to increase interest in the film. However, the New York/Los Angeles release received mostly negative reviews, and Paramount stood by its decision to not expand it to other cities. It briefly played cable television a year later, then virtually disappeared from circulation. The film was produced by James William Guercio (billed as James Guercio), who previously had directed Blake in the film Electra Glide in Blue.

== Home media ==
Second-Hand Hearts, together with another Ashby film made for Lorimar, Lookin' to Get Out, got a British video release through Guild Home Video in the early 1980s, but never received a domestic home video release until 2013, when it was released on Manufacture-on-Demand DVD by Warner Archive.
