= Waldo Salt: A Screenwriter's Journey =

1990 film

- Directed by: Eugene Corr; Robert Hillmann
- Written by: Eugene Corr
- Produced by: Robert Hillmann; Eugene Corr; Danica Remy
- Narrated by: Peter Coyote
- Distributed by: PBS
- Release date: 1990
- Country: United States
- Language: English

Waldo Salt: A Screenwriter's Journey is a 1990 American documentary film directed by Eugene Corr. It was nominated for an Academy Award for Best Documentary Feature. The film was screened at the 1990 Sundance Film Festival and is a part of the PBS American Masters series of documentary films.

The documentary is about the life and work of American screenwriter Waldo Salt who was put on the Hollywood blacklist in the 1950s but went on to win two Academy Awards in the 1970s. The story is told through interviews with collaborators and friends such as Dustin Hoffman, Robert Redford, Jon Voight, John Schlesinger and with clips from Salt's films, chiefly Midnight Cowboy.

== Archive ==
The Academy Film Archive houses the Waldo Salt: A Screenwriter's Journey Collection, which consists of approximately three hundred items, including film prints and film and audio production elements.
