= Carole Eastman =

American screenwriter

- Born: February 19, 1934; Glendale, California, United States
- Died: February 13, 2004 (aged 69); Los Angeles, California, United States
- Other names: Adrien Joyce; A.L. Appling
- Occupation: Screenwriter
- Relatives: Charles K. Eastman

Carole Eastman (February 19, 1934 – February 13, 2004) was an American actress and screenwriter. Among her credits are screenplays for Monte Hellman's The Shooting (1967), Bob Rafelson's Five Easy Pieces (1970) (for which she was nominated for an Academy Award along with co-writer Rafelson), and Mike Nichols’s The Fortune (1975). She occasionally used the pseudonyms Adrien Joyce and A.L. Appling.

== Early life ==
Carole Joyce Eastman was born February 19, 1934, in Glendale, California to a mother who was once a secretary for Bing Crosby, and a father who worked as a grip for Warner Brothers. Her uncle was a film cameraman. Eastman attended Hollywood High School and studied ballet with choreographer Eugene Loring. Eastman was expelled from High School for truancy in favor of dance. After high school, breaking her foot ended her dance career.

== Career ==
Her brother, Charles K. Eastman, cast her in his play, leading to an agent contract. Eastman studied acting from Jeff Corey, befriending Jack Nicholson, a classmate. Her friend, Monte Hellman, asked Eastman to write a screenplay for The Shooting, that starred Nicholson. Her next films, Five Easy Pieces, The Fortune, Man Trouble, starred Nicholson. Puzzle of a Downfall Child starred Faye Dunaway.

== Personal life ==
Eastman suffered from Epstein-Barr virus for six years and died on February 13, 2004. University of Texas has archived some of Eastmans papers.

"an absolutely great vision about the foibles of people and a very idiosyncratic sense of humor" - Jack Nicholson

== Filmography ==
- Alfred Hitchcock Presents (1962) (season 7, episode 14: "Bad Actor") as Marjorie Rogers
- The Shooting (1967, writer)
- Run for Your Life (1968, TV)
  - season 2, episode 9: "The Treasure Seekers" (writer)
  - season 2, episode 12: Hang Down Your Head and Laugh" (teleplay)
  - season 3, episode 20: "Saro-Jane, You Never Whispered Again" (teleplay)
- Model Shop (1969, English dialogue)
- Five Easy Pieces (1970) (screenplay/story)
- Puzzle of a Downfall Child (1970, screenplay)
- The Fortune (1975, writer)
- Man Trouble (1992, writer)
- Running Mates (1992) (TV, writer)
