= Bert Remsen =

American actor, casting director (1925–1999)

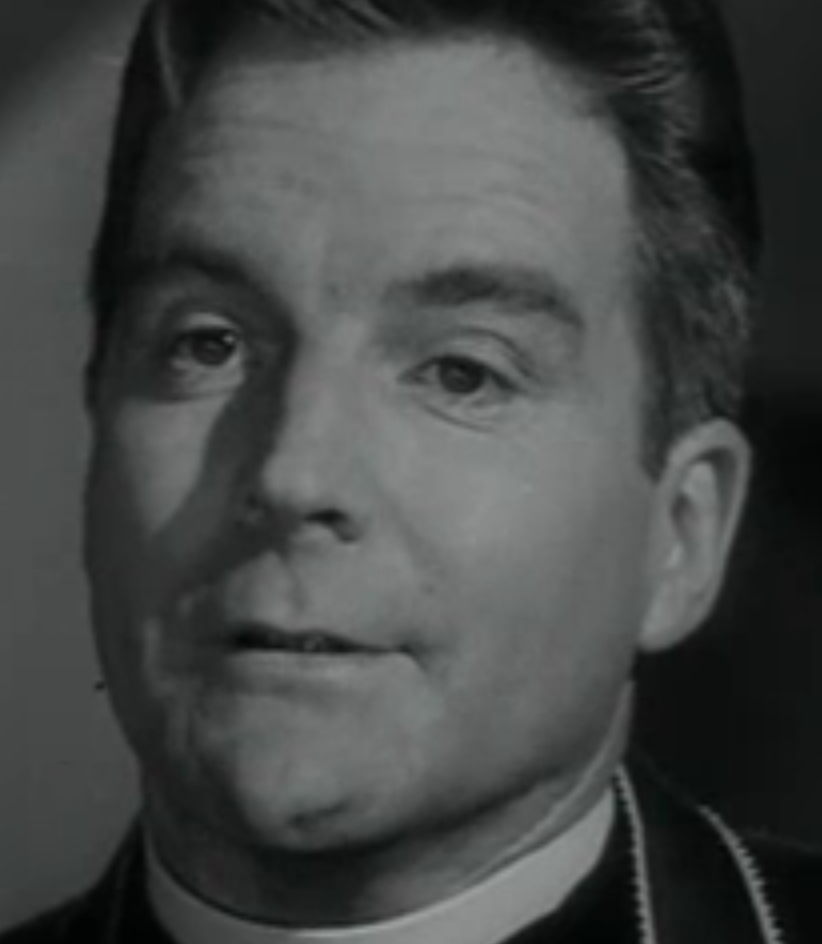
- Bert Remsen in an episode of One Step Beyond (1960)
- Born: Herbert Birchell Remsen; February 25, 1925; Glen Cove, New York, U.S.
- Died: April 22, 1999 (aged 74); Los Angeles, California, U.S.
- Resting place: Forest Lawn Memorial Park
- Occupations: Actor; Casting director
- Years active: 1952–1999
- Spouses: Katherine MacGregor (m. 1949; div. 1950) Barbara Dodd (m. 1959; died 1999)
- Children: 2, including Kerry Remsen

Herbert Birchell Remsen (February 25, 1925 – April 22, 1999) was an American actor and casting director. He appeared in numerous films and television series.

== Early life and military service ==
Remsen was born in Glen Cove, New York, on Long Island, the son of Helen (née Birchell) and Winfred Herbert Remsen.

Seaman 1/c Herbert B. Remsen was a crew member on the destroyer USS Laffey during the Battle of Okinawa in World War II. On April 16, 1945, the USS Laffey was attacked by 22 Japanese kamikaze planes during an 80-minute period. Remsen suffered burns during the battle but was able to return to duty and survive what the US Navy called, "one of the great sea epics of war".

== Career ==
He played character roles in numerous films directed by Robert Altman, including Brewster McCloud (1970), McCabe & Mrs. Miller (1971), Thieves Like Us (1974), California Split (1974), Nashville (1975), Buffalo Bill and the Indians, or Sitting Bull's History Lesson (1976) and A Wedding (1978).

Remsen's other film credits included Fuzz (1972), Baby Blue Marine (1976), Uncle Joe Shannon (1978), Fast Break (1979), Carny (1980), Borderline (1980), Inside Moves (1980), Second-Hand Hearts (1981), Lookin' to Get Out (1982), The Sting II (1983), Places in the Heart (1984), Code of Silence (1985), TerrorVision (1986), Eye of the Tiger (1986), Miss Firecracker (1989), Sundown: The Vampire in Retreat (1989), Daddy's Dyin': Who's Got the Will? (1990) and Only the Lonely (1991). His last film was the posthumously released The Sky is Falling (2000).

He also appeared in various television guest-starring roles, including the role of Jim Ford in the episode "Pete Henke" of the 1958 NBC western series, Jefferson Drum, starring Jeff Richards. He was a regular in the cast of the short-lived 1976 NBC dramatic television series Gibbsville, a regular in the first season (1980-1981) of the ABC comedy television series It's a Living as Mario the cook, and appeared on Dallas in 1987 as Harrison 'Dandy' Dandridge. He portrayed a judge in the pilot for The Adventures of Brisco County, Jr. (1993).

After suffering an injury on the set of a television show, Remsen had moved away from acting, working in casting from 1966 to 1974. Other than one voice credit over the next few years (an announcer's voice in a 1969 episode of The F.B.I.), he did not return to acting until 1970, when he was hired as the casting director on Brewster McCloud, where director Altman talked him into taking a small role in the film instead. During his nine years as a casting director and casting supervisor, in addition to a slowly increasing workload on screen, Remsen was casting director for 31 different television series or television movies, including 25 episodes each of The F.B.I. and The Rookies.

== Personal life ==
He was first married to actress Katherine MacGregor, who played Mrs. Oleson in the NBC television series Little House on the Prairie. His daughter, with second wife Barbara Joyce Dodd, a casting director, is actress Kerry Remsen.

== Select acting filmography ==
=== Film ===
- Pork Chop Hill (1959) - Lieutenant Cummings
- Tess of the Storm Country (1960) - Mike Foley
- Moon Pilot (1962) - Agent Brown
- Kid Galahad (1962) - Max (uncredited)
- Dead Ringer (1964) - Dan Lister
- The Lollipop Cover (1965) - Salesman
- The Strawberry Statement (1970) - Policeman at Gate
- Brewster McCloud (1970) - Officer Douglas Breen
- McCabe & Mrs. Miller (1971) - Bart Coyle
- Fuzz (1972) - Sergeant Murchison
- Thieves Like Us (1974) - 'T-Dub'
- California Split (1974) - Helen Brown
- Nashville (1975) - Star
- Baby Blue Marine (1976) - Mr. Hudkins
- Harry and Walter Go to New York (1976) - Guard O'Meara
- Buffalo Bill and the Indians, or Sitting Bull's History Lesson (1976) - The Bartender (Crutch)
- Tarantulas: The Deadly Cargo (1977, TV Movie) - Mayor Douglas
- A Wedding (1978) - William Williamson
- Uncle Joe Shannon (1978) - Braddock
- Fast Break (1979) - Bo Winnegar
- Joni (1979) - John Eareckson
- Carny (1980) - Delno Baptiste
- Borderline (1980) - Carl J. Richards
- Inside Moves (1980) - 'Stinky'
- Second-Hand Hearts (1981) - Voyd
- Lookin' to Get Out (1982) - 'Smitty'
- Independence Day (1983) - 'Red' Malone
- The Sting II (1983) - 'Kid Colors'
- Lies (1983) - Murrey Haliday
- Policewoman Centerfold (1983) - Captain Buckman
- Places in the Heart (1984) - 'Tee Tot' Hightower
- Code of Silence (1985) - Commander Kates
- Stand Alone (1985) - Paddie
- TerrorVision (1986) - Grampa
- Tai-Pan (1986) - Wilf Tillman
- Eye of the Tiger (1986) - Father Healey
- P.K. and the Kid (1987) - Al
- Three for the Road (1987) - Stu
- Remote Control (1988) - Bill Denver
- South of Reno (1988) - Howard Stone
- Miss Firecracker (1989) - Mr. Morton
- Sundown: The Vampire in Retreat (1989) - Milt
- Curfew (1989) - Gentleman with Cane
- Vietnam, Texas (1990) - Monsignor Sheehan
- Daddy's Dyin': Who's Got the Will? (1990) - Daddy
- Peacemaker (1990) - 'Doc'
- Dick Tracy (1990) - Bartender
- Jezebel's Kiss (1990) - Dr. Samuel Whatley
- Evil Spirits (1990) - John Wilson
- Payback (1991) - Burt
- Only the Lonely (1991) - 'Spats'
- The Player (1992) - Bert Remsen
- Loving Lulu (1992)
- The Bodyguard (1992) - Rotary Club President
- Joshua Tree (1993) - Woody Engstrom
- Jack the Bear (1993) - Mitchell
- In the Shadows, Someone's Watching (1993, TV movie) - Oliver London
- Maverick (1994) - Riverboat Poker Player #7
- White Man's Burden (1995) - Hot Dog Vendor
- Conspiracy Theory (1997) - Mr. Sutton
- Road Ends (1997) - Arliss
- Hugo Pool (1997) - Sad Old Man
- The Sky Is Falling (1999) - Mr. Finch
- Forces of Nature (1999) - Ned
- A Walk in the Park (1999) - Ken Sherry

=== Television ===
Year	Title	Role	Notes
1958	Jefferson Drum	Jim Ford	Season 1, Episode 9 "Pete Henke"
1959	Rawhide	Ash	Season 2 Episode 3: "Incident at Dangerfield Dip"
1960	Wanted: Dead or Alive	Lieutenant Pierce	Season 2, Episode 28 "Vendetta"
1961	Rawhide	Murdock	S3:E13, "Incident Near the Promised Land"
1961	Rawhide	Murdock	Season 3 Episode 14: "Incident of the Big Blowout"
1961	Rawhide	Murdock	Season 4 Episode 1: "Rio Salado"
1961	Alfred Hitchcock Presents	Police Lieutenant Marsh	Season 6 Episode 20: "The Throwback"
1961	Alfred Hitchcock Presents	Policeman	Season 6 Episode 28: "Gratitude"
1961	Alfred Hitchcock Presents	Jimmy the Bartender	Season 7 Episode 10: "Services Rendered"
1961	Alfred Hitchcock Presents	Pete the Police Officer	Season 7 Episode 11: "The Right Kind of Medicine"
1962	The Alfred Hitchcock Hour	Sheriff	Season 1 Episode 7: "Annabel"
1962	Leave It to Beaver	Mr. Thompson	Season 5, Episode 23 "Eddie Quits School"
1963	The Fugitive	U.S. Coast Guard Skipper	Season 1, Episode 4 "Never Wave Goodbye Part II"
1975	The Rookies	Lucas Dawson	Season 4, Episode 12 “The Reluctant Hero”
1976	Gibbsville	Mr. Pell	13 Episodes
1976	Columbo	Mark	Season 6, Episode 1 "Fade in to Murder"
1979	The New Adventures of Wonder Woman	Dr. Jaffe	Season 3, Episode 20 "The Boy Who Knew Her Secret"
1979	Hart to Hart	Jimmy Delaney	Season 1, Episode 7 "Cop Out"
1980	It's a Living	Mario the Cook	13 Episodes
1987	Dallas	Harrison 'Dandy' Dandridge	10 Episodes
1993	The Adventures of Brisco County, Jr.	Judge	Pilot Episode
1996	Baywatch	Shop Owner	Season 6, Episode 22 "Go for the Gold"
