= Robert C. Jones =

American film editor (1936–2021)

- Born: Robert Clifford Jones; March 30, 1936; Los Angeles, California, U.S.
- Died: February 1, 2021 (aged 84); Los Angeles, California, U.S.
- Occupation: Film editor
- Spouse: Sylvia Hirsch Jones
- Children: Leslie Jones
- Parent: Harmon Jones

Robert Clifford Jones (March 30, 1936 – February 1, 2021) was an American film editor. As an editor, he had notable collaborations with the directors Arthur Hiller (seven films from 1967 to 1992) and Hal Ashby (four films from 1973 to 1982). He was nominated three times for the Academy Award for Best Film Editing: It's a Mad, Mad, Mad, Mad World (1963), Guess Who's Coming to Dinner (1967), and Bound for Glory (1976). He also received an Academy Award for writing the screenplay for the film Coming Home (1978).

== Early life ==
Jones was born in Los Angeles on March 30, 1936. His father, Harmon Jones, was a Canadian-born film editor who was nominated for an Oscar for his work on Gentleman's Agreement. Jones enrolled in college, but subsequently dropped out and worked at a shipping room for 20th Century Fox. He started off as an assistant film editor for movies like Untamed (1955) and The Long, Hot Summer (1958). He described his job as "magic", adding that it had "opened my eyes to what my dad had done".

After being drafted into the U.S. Army, Jones worked at the Army Pictorial Center from 1958 to 1960. Even though he did not attend film school or have any formal training in editing, he was thrust into the role of a film editor. He was responsible for editing Army training films, documentaries, and several segments of The Big Picture television program. He credits this stint for giving him the "experience and confidence" needed to pursue a career in film editing.

== Career ==
Upon his return from military service, Jones collaborated with Gene Fowler Jr. to edit A Child Is Waiting and It's a Mad, Mad, Mad, Mad World (both released in 1963). He was nominated for the Academy Award for Best Film Editing for the latter film. He then increased his editing credentials by working on The Tiger Makes Out (1967) and Paint Your Wagon (1969). His work in Guess Who's Coming to Dinner (1967) earned him his second Oscar nomination for Best Film Editing. Almost a decade elapsed before he received his third Academy Award editing nomination for the musical drama Bound for Glory (1976).

Jones was also involved in writing film scripts. He initially declined to work on Coming Home (1978) as editor when Hal Ashby asked him. However, he relented and joined as a screenwriter after Waldo Salt suffered a heart attack two months before the start of production. That film ultimately won the 1979 Academy Award for Best Writing, Screenplay Written Directly for the Screen, which he shared with Salt and Nancy Dowd. Jones was surprised by the win and stated that going on stage to receive the award marked the first time he met Salt and Dowd. He was then the co-screenwriter for Being There (1979), which his daughter said he rewrote. Although he was originally granted credit by the studio (United Artists–Lorimar Productions), the Writers Guild reversed that in an arbitration decision and awarded credit only to Jerzy Kosiński, the author of the book that the movie was based on. Jones believed that his "writing career would have been a whole lot different if [he] had gotten screen credit" and that "it was a dark day in my life". He consequently focused on editing for the remainder of his career.

The final film Jones edited was Unconditional Love, released in 2002. After retiring from the film industry, he became a professor at the School of Cinematic Arts of the University of Southern California (USC), serving in that capacity for 15 years. He was presented with the American Cinema Editors Career Achievement Award in February 2014.

== Personal life ==
Jones was married to Sylvia Hirsch Jones, a professor of psychology, for 59 years until his death. Together, they had two daughters: Hayley and Leslie, who followed her father's footsteps and was nominated for the Academy Award for Best Film Editing. She assisted Jones during the early part of her career on films like See No Evil, Hear No Evil and The Babe.

Jones died on February 1, 2021, at his home in Los Angeles. He was 84, and suffered from Lewy body dementia in the time leading up to his death.

== Filmography ==
Editor
Year	Film	Director	Notes	Ref.
1963	A Child Is Waiting	John Cassavetes		
1963	It's a Mad, Mad, Mad, Mad World	Stanley Kramer	First collaboration with Stanley Kramer	
1964	Invitation to a Gunfighter	Richard Wilson		
1965	Ship of Fools	Stanley Kramer	Second collaboration with Stanley Kramer	
1966	The Trouble with Angels	Ida Lupino		
1966	Don't Worry, We'll Think of a Title	Harmon Jones		
1967	Tobruk	Arthur Hiller	First collaboration with Arthur Hiller	
1967	The Tiger Makes Out	Arthur Hiller	Second collaboration with Arthur Hiller	
1967	Guess Who's Coming to Dinner	Stanley Kramer	Third collaboration with Stanley Kramer	
1968	I Love You, Alice B. Toklas	Hy Averback		
1969	Paint Your Wagon	Joshua Logan		
1970	Love Story	Arthur Hiller	Third collaboration with Arthur Hiller	
1971	Cisco Pike	Bill L. Norton		
1972	The New Centurions	Richard Fleischer		
1972	Man of La Mancha	Arthur Hiller	Fourth collaboration with Arthur Hiller	
1973	The Last Detail	Hal Ashby	First collaboration with Hal Ashby	
1974	The Crazy World of Julius Vrooder	Arthur Hiller	Fifth collaboration with Arthur Hiller	
1975	Shampoo	Hal Ashby	Second collaboration with Hal Ashby	
1976	Bound for Glory	Hal Ashby	Third collaboration with Hal Ashby	
1978	Heaven Can Wait	Warren Beatty; Buck Henry	First collaboration with Warren Beatty	
1982	Lookin' to Get Out	Hal Ashby	Sixth collaboration with Hal Ashby	
1985	Twice in a Lifetime	Bud Yorkin		
1989	See No Evil, Hear No Evil	Arthur Hiller	Sixth collaboration with Arthur Hiller	
1990	Days of Thunder	Tony Scott		
1991	Married to It	Arthur Hiller	Seventh collaboration with Arthur Hiller	
1992	The Babe	Arthur Hiller	Eighth collaboration with Arthur Hiller	
1993	Beyond the Law	Larry Ferguson		
1994	Love Affair	Glenn Gordon Caron		
1996	City Hall	Harold Becker		
1998	Bulworth	Warren Beatty	Second collaboration with Warren Beatty	
1999	Crazy in Alabama	Antonio Banderas		
2002	Unconditional Love	P. J. Hogan		

Editorial department
Year	Film	Director	Role	Notes
1955	Untamed	Henry King	Apprentice editor	Uncredited
1958	The Long, Hot Summer	Martin Ritt	First assistant editor	Uncredited
1993	Indecent Proposal	Adrian Lyne	Additional film editor	

Thanks
Year	Film	Director	Role
1982	Lookin' to Get Out	Hal Ashby	Special thanks: For being there

Writer
Year	Film	Director	Notes	Other notes	Ref.
1978	Coming Home	Hal Ashby	Fourth collaboration with Hal Ashby		
1979	Being There	Hal Ashby	Fifth collaboration with Hal Ashby	Uncredited	

TV movies

Additional crew
Year	Film	Director	Role
1986	Picnic	Marshall W. Mason	Technical director

TV series

Writer
Year	Title	Notes
1984	Faerie Tale Theatre	2 episodes

TV specials

Thanks
Year	Title	Role
2021	93rd Academy Awards	In memoriam

== Academy Awards ==
Year (Note: Indicates the year of the ceremony.)	Category	Work	Result	Ref.
1964	Best Film Editing	It's a Mad, Mad, Mad, Mad World	Nominated	
1968	Best Film Editing	Guess Who's Coming to Dinner	Nominated	
1977	Best Film Editing	Bound for Glory	Nominated	
1979	Best Writing, Screenplay Written Directly for the Screen	Coming Home	Won	

== See also ==
- List of film director and editor collaborations
