= Hal (2018 film) =

- Directed by: Amy Scott
- Produced by: Christine Beebe; Lisa Janssen; Jonathan Lynch; Brian Morrow
- Distributed by: Oscilloscope Laboratories
- Release dates: January 2018 (Sundance); September 7, 2018
- Running time: 88 min
- Country: United States
- Language: English

Hal is a 2018 American documentary film by Amy Scott about the film director Hal Ashby. It premiered at the Sundance Film Festival on January and was released theatrically by Oscilloscope Laboratories on September 7, 2018.

== Summary ==
The film is a celebration of Ashby's life and work, set against the backdrop of a rapidly changing America and an even more dramatic shift in film making. Once the toast of New Hollywood, his rise and fall became another story of art against the film industry. The documentary includes many interviews with Ashby's contemporaries, and it has been reviewed as "warm, beautifully made."

== Reception ==
Rolling Stone included the film in its "10 Best Documentaries of 2018" and Entertainment Weekly included it in its "Sundance 2018: The 11 best films of this year's festival".

It earned a 90% on Rotten Tomatoes. The site's critical consensus reads, "Hal pays affectionate tribute to a filmmaker whose offscreen life proves as engaging as his best work."

It was nominated for a Producers Guild Award for Outstanding Producer of Documentary Motion Pictures.

== See also ==
- 2018 in film
- List of female directors
