= Guthrie Thomas =

American singer-songwriter and record label executive (1952–2016)

Guthrie Thomas (January 6, 1952 – July 13, 2016) was an Americana singer-songwriter, producer and record label executive. After releasing two albums on Capitol Records, he started his own label, Eagle Records, and self-released and produced numerous other artists in the 1980s.

== Early life ==
Born Andrew Lynn Herring on January 6, 1952, in Fort Worth, Texas. His family eventually settled in Lawton, Oklahoma, where he married Beverly Ann Hawkins. She sued for abandonment and divorce in 1970 and remarried a year later. Thomas left school before completing ninth grade.

In the early 1970s, located in California and credited as Andrew Herring, he played college and community venues as a country-folk artist. He claimed at the time that, at age 17, he moved to North Carolina to study guitar with Doc Watson. A reporter for The Topanga Messenger recalled meeting him in 1970, "living under the Topanga Center bridge" and grieving for his wife and newborn child, who he claimed recently died in a car accident. He spent much of his time practicing guitar in order to fulfill what "his late wife believed he should be: a musician."

Thomas claimed that he met Woody Guthrie when he was four years old, when Guthrie and Ramblin' Jack Elliott passed through Oklahoma on a cross-country trip. He later described this story as a "blatant lie." He adopted his stage name as a tribute to Woody Guthrie and Dylan Thomas.

== Career ==
=== Sittin' Crooked and Dear Ginny ===
Thomas recounted his career origins to the press in different ways. A more recent autobiographical statement on his now-defunct website described living in Rhonert Park, California in 1973, teaching guitar classes at a local college. He introduced himself to Ramblin' Jack Elliott, who was playing a concert nearby, and persisted in developing a friendship with him. Elliott hired Thomas as a road manager. Through Elliott, he was introduced to Bob Weir, Arlo Guthrie and Hoyt Axton. With these connections, he launched his professional career.

Thomas released his first album Sittin’ Crooked in 1974, produced by Raynold Gideon with Larry Hirsch. Elliott contributed liner notes. "It’s not necessary to use words of praise. Guthrie first dazzled me in Colati, Calif. With his lightening fast fingerpicking and abalone guitar. He’s a might good okie songster and a great road buddy in hotels with truckers, cowboys and whores," wrote Elliot. Critic and DJ Jay Meehan observed that the album paid close homage to the styles of Woody Guthrie and Ramblin' Jack. "If anything outshines the hot licks and the poetic lyrics, it is the sheer potential housed within the man," he said. "His next one is bound to be a barn-burner."

By this time, Thomas had relocated to Los Angeles. He resided with girlfriend Virginia Vick, who was supporting them while Thomas attempted to land a recording contract. An advertisement at McCabe's guitar shop connected Thomas with a new musical collaborator, Marc Edelsen. The two worked together on many subsequent albums.

Later that year, Ramblin' Jack Elliott was invited to perform at KMOR, a radio station in Murray, Utah, by DJ Jay Meehan, host of the Mellow Country radio show. Thomas, then acting as Elliott's road manager, was in Park City to perform as well. Thomas joined his friend in the studio and the short concert included the two trading songs on air and playing together as station personnel recorded the performance.

After the concert, Thomas asked the station for a copy of the recording and in 1975 released the album Dear Ginny on private label Rarer Records, with both artists listed on the cover. The first side of the album was recorded in Los Angeles and included Thomas solo and with Marc Edelsen, while the second side consisted of portions of the KMOR concert with Elliott performing, accompanied by Thomas. Thomas sold the LP at live concerts. Elliott was reportedly unhappy with this unauthorized release. Only 500 copies were pressed.

=== Capitol Records and Bound for Glory ===
In 1975, Thomas began working with producer Nick Venet and engineer Andy MacDonald at the Record Plant. The album Guthrie Thomas I, was released on Capitol Records later that year. "The most remarkable new talent of this year and one of the finest of this decade," said a review in The Times. "Guthrie Thomas offers a debut album of stunning dimensions." The Times-Herald of Vallejo, CA gave it 6 out of 10 stars. "Required listening for every budding troubadour," according to the Tucson Daily Citizen, which compared Thomas favorably to Jim Croce. "This album is a find--a real sleeper," said the Los Angeles Free Press. It also received favorable reviews from Variety and The Columbia Record.

To promote the album, Capitol released a single, "Arlo Guthrie on Guthrie Thomas", consisting of sample tracks and a phone interview with musician Arlo Guthrie, praising the work. Guthrie, Ringo Starr and Hoyt Axton also contributed to radio advertisements for the album's marketing.

In 1975, Thomas landed a small role in the Hal Ashby film Bound for Glory, portraying Woody Guthrie's younger brother George. He also contributed to the film as a music coordinator and reportedly tried (unsuccessfully) to teach David Carradine how to play guitar.

Lies and Alibis, Thomas' fourth album in total and second on Capitol Records, was released in 1976. It featured notable contributions from his friend, drummer Ringo Starr. According to one source, Thomas met Starr while recording a Hoyt Axton television special and the two became good friends, with Thomas a frequent guest at Starr's LA home. Starr played on three tracks from Lies and Alibis and sang a duet with Thomas on the song "Band of Steel," written by Starr and intended for his Beaucoups of Blues album, but given to Thomas to record instead. Other players include drummer Jim Keltner, John Hartford, David Paich, Lyle Ritz, David Foster and Joyous Noise frontman Lee Montgomery.

Lies and Alibis received positive to mixed reviews. The Star-Phoenix criticized the production and arrangement of the album. "Weak," said The Lawrence Journal-World, which nonetheless noted Thomas' development as an artist and singled out "Band of Steel" as a high point, along with a duet with John Hartford. The Beaver County Times reviewed it favorably, though noting that Thomas had a unique ability to sound like other artists.

Dedicated to his then-partner Virginia Vick, it was Thomas' last major-label release.

In a 1976 interview with the Austin American-Statesman, Thomas described his working methods at the time: writing songs on legal pads "like you do a script," revising up to 15 times, writing four or five songs per day. He acknowledged heavy cocaine usage, but worked to break the habit due to its detrimental effects. "It makes you pretty scatterbrained and makes you yell at your old lady a lot."

=== Kidnapping incident ===
On June 4, 1976, Thomas, then 24, allegedly pulled his 30 year old girlfriend Virginia Vick from her car in a parking lot near her apartment in Austin, Texas and took her against her will to Lawton, Oklahoma, where Vick alleged she was held captive in the home of Thomas' uncle. Detectives say she was held prisoner until his uncle helped her escape. Thomas denied the charge but surrendered to police on June 24, held on $150,000 bond.

A few days later, a charge of aggravated kidnapping was filed in the Austin municipal court. Thomas described Vick as his common-law wife and alleged that it was "a family spat that has been carried a little too far." He began a hunger strike in protest of the high bond, which was then lowered to $40,000. Writing from the Travis County Jail to the editor of the Austin-American Statesman, Thomas asserted that Vick was his wife of two and a half years and that he was being aided in setting up interviews and press coverage for his plight by friends such as Ringo Starr, the local sheriff Raymond Frank, and Playboy Magazine: "I am no criminal." On July 3, with bail further lowered (to $25,000), Thomas posted bond with the aid of several friends. Jerry Jeff Walker was present for his release.

A week later, the newspaper announced an eight-hour concert to raise funds for Thomas, with performances by Arlo Guthrie, Jerry Jeff Walker, Steve Fromholz, John Hartford, B.W. Stevenson, Rusty Wier and Ray Wylie Hubbard. The concert was scheduled to take place on Wednesday, July 14 at the City Coliseum. On the day of the concert, Thomas announced that it was postponed "pending on the birth of Arlo Guthrie's child." In an interview with the Austin Daily Texan, Thomas criticized the actions of Austin law enforcement, and lamented his relationship with Vick, who had inspired many of his prior songs and most of the material for his upcoming new album. He described plans to scrap those songs and write new material based on his experiences in the Travis County jail, and expressed thanks for the support of Jerry Jeff Walker.

On July 19, Thomas played a much-anticipated concert at the music venue Castle Creek, where he was lauded for his "superb" guitar playing amidst poor sound amplification, according to the Austin American-Statesman. While not an "innovative genius," he displayed "technical accomplishment and a well-rooted musicianship." The concert was notable for rumors that Ringo Starr was to attend. Earlier that day, the Austin Citizen carried an interview with Ringo Starr, saying he had come to Austin to play a benefit concert for Thomas. Rumors circulated widely through the community, but Starr did not appear at the DA or in court on Thomas' behalf. A phone call interview, purported to be with Starr, claimed that Starr indeed was at the concert, albeit unobserved. Reporters from the Austin Daily Texan traced the phone number of the Ringo Starr interview and placed a call to it, answered by Guthrie Thomas. The Texan concluded that the incident was a hoax, while Thomas denied making claims about Starr's whereabouts. Local press speculated that Thomas' behavior was designed to gain publicity for a flagging career.

By August 5, Thomas was back in prison, the result of his bondsman asking to be released from the contract, citing unpaid fees.

That November, he played a concert in Burlington, Vermont. Opening for John Hartford, the Burlington Free Press praised his guitar and singing, but criticized his excessive drinking, smoking and swearing on stage, which alienated the attendees.

A year later, Thomas was briefly the subject of a death hoax in Austin, but local journalists confirmed he was indeed still alive.

After the incident, Thomas released his next album Kidnapped, on Carmen Records. It was recorded directly to two-track tape, with Thomas accompanied only by harmonica player Mark Dawson. "It takes a lot of guts to release a record like this," said OP magazine. "These are eight well-written, lyrically powerful songs that cut to the heart without any pretense." Critic Steven Dillman observed that most of the songs were sad. On one track, Thomas thanks Jerry Jeff Walker for his friendship.

On 1983's As Yet Untitled, Thomas contributed a statement on the album jacket, alluding to a turbulent time in his past in which he struggled with "drugs, alcohol and over-inflated ego." He apologized to his friends for his previous years of problematic behavior as he was "getting himself back together."

=== Later career ===
By 1977, still living in Topanga Canyon, Thomas claimed to be worth $2.5 million, on account of strong overseas sales of his music and royalties from his work on the film Bound for Glory, with hopes of shopping his next album to MCA Records.

In 1980, he claimed to be working on a film about Hank Williams, in which he was possibly to star. In 1982 he was reported to be dating Kimi Peck, screenwriter of Little Darlings.

1983's As Yet Untitled was praised for its melodies and band but criticized for its lyrical content by one critic. This One's for Sarah and Buffalo received similar critiques from OP Magazine.

On 1984's Hobo Eagle Thief "Guthrie Thomas, just as natural as a sunrise, aided by a score of friends, including Ringo Starr on drums. Nine folk treats of merit," said one critic. Another review was less favorable. "The blame rests with his songs; he's the Robert W. Service of the country/folk scene. The cliches are nearly overwhelming on every cut..."

Of 1996's Midnight Train, Dirty Linen said "He gets a good cowboy vibe going, but you know he'll be blowing out of town with the tumbleweeds come the next dust storm."

== Eagle Records ==
In the late 1970s, Thomas formed Eagle Records, a small independent label. He began releasing and re-releasing his own albums as well as those of other artists. Production continued into the 1980s. Eagle Records, with Thomas as president and often credited as producer, advertised production and distribution services worldwide. Eagle released albums by a variety of artists, including Mustard's Retreat, Josh White Jr. and Steve Bach.

On tour, Guthrie Thomas met a young pianist named John Nilsen, who was selected by a club owner to open Thomas’ concert in Ashland. Thomas signed Nilsen and produced his first three albums (Sea of Inspiration, Transparencies and October in September), helping launch the pianist's career.

By 1985, Thomas claimed to have been in business for 12 years, with 27 acts on the label and distribution deals in 14 countries. "I have no preference to musical style, as long as it's good," he told The Calgary Herald.

Illuminations by T.J. Lawrence was lauded by Electronic Sound magazine for its "brilliance" and "outstanding material" being ahead of the time.

Other titles in the catalog included albums by New Wave band Bully Boy, Deborah Liv Johnson, jazz guitarist Cam Newton, violinist Kim Angelis, and country-charting duo Topel and Ware.

== Later life ==
After many years as a profession musician, Thomas, citing financial instability, went back to school. He completed a high school degree and enrolled in college, earning degrees in music, psychology and pharmacy. He worked as a pharmacist in Nevada. Rarely performing live, he continued to self-release music on various platforms. He also had a business making custom guitar picks, some in collaboration with long-time Willie Nelson lighting director Budrock Prewitt. Nelson himself was also a frequent guitar pick customer.

Guthrie Thomas died on July 13, 2016.

== Discography ==
- Sittin’ Crooked (1974) - Singing Folks Records
- Dear Ginny (1975, with Ramblin’ Jack Elliott) - Rarer Records
- Guthrie Thomas I (1975) - Capitol Records
- Lies and Alibis (1976) Capitol Records
- Kidnapped (1976) Carmen Records
- La Belle Poisoneuse (1979) Carmen Records
- This One's for Sarah (1982) Eagle Records
- Once on a While Forever (1982) - Pastels Records
- Buffalo (1983) - Eagle Records
- Hobo Eagle Thief (1983) - Eagle Records
- As Yet Untitled (1983) - Eagle Records, Pastels Records
- Like No Other (1983) - Stetson Records
- The Writer (1990) - Taxim Records
- Live On Stage (1993/2024) - New Shot
- Midnight Train (1996) - Taxim Records
- Ghost Towns (1999) - Mainstreet CD
- Yesterdays and Tomorrows (2000) -Mainstreet CD

== Eagle Records catalog ==
Title	Artist	Year	Catalog number
Through the Side Door	Kansas City	1984	SM4190
Sittin' Crooked	Guthrie Thomas		SM4172
Dear Ginny	Guthrie Thomas and Ramblin' Jack Elliott		SM4173
Almost Alone	Josh White Jr.	1984	SM4186
La Belle Poisoneuse	Guthrie Thomas	Example	SM4179
Christmas	Bruce Malament	Example	SM1025
Prime Numbers	Cam Newton and Michael Bard	Example	SM4100
October in September	John Nilsen	1986	SM4198
Hearthside	Topel and Ware	1985	SM6948
Consider This	Kim Angelis	1985	SM4968
Born by the River	Stockton and Johnson	1985	SM4297
Child's Play	Steve Bach	1985	SM4220
Silhouette	Andrew Gordon	1985	SM4199
Wind on the Water	Victor Spiegel	1985	SM4197
Mahogany Whispers	Deborah Liv Johnson	1985	SM4196
Still Life and Old Dreams	George Roessler	1985	SM4195
Illuminations	T.J. Lawrence	1985	SM4194
Frontispieces	Bully Boy	1985	SM2020
Holiday Favorites On Guitar	James Wilson	1985	SM1024
Home by the Morning	Mustard's Retreat	1984	SM4192
The Magician Upstairs	Dal Riada	1984	SM4189
First Collection	Iverson and Walters	1984	SM4188
Transparencies: Piano Solos	John Nilsen	1984	SM4185
Impressions in Ivory	Johnny Gal	1984	SM4184
Kidnapped	Guthrie Thomas	1984	SM4174
Take Me Back	Dean Steiding	1983	SM4183
This One’s for Sarah	Guthrie Thomas	1982	SM4178
Hobo Eagle Thief	Guthrie Thomas	1983	SM4182
Sea of Inspiration	John Nilsen	1983	SM4181
Buffalo	Guthrie Thomas	1983	SM4177
As Yet Untitled	Guthrie Thomas	1983	SM4180
