= Waldo Salt =

American screenwriter (1914–1987)

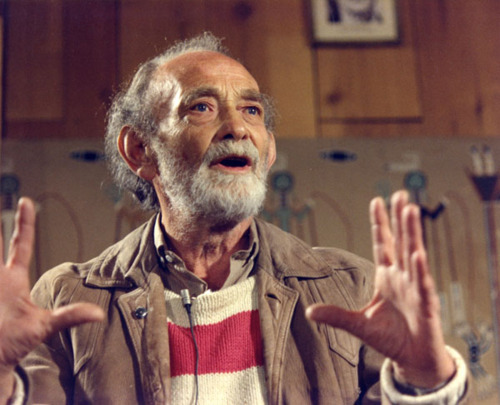
- Born: October 18, 1914; Chicago, Illinois, U.S.
- Died: March 7, 1987 (aged 72); Los Angeles, California, U.S.
- Other names: Arthur Behrstock; M.L. Davenport; Mel Davenport
- Education: Stanford University (AB)
- Occupation: Screenwriter
- Years active: 1937–1978
- Spouses: Ambur Dana (m. 1938; div. 1941) Mary Davenport (m. 1942, divorced) Gladys Schwartz (m. 1969; died 1981) Eve Merriam (m. 1983)
- Children: 2 with Davenport (including Jennifer Salt)

Waldo Miller Salt (October 18, 1914 – March 7, 1987) was an American screenwriter. He wrote the Academy Award-winning screenplays for Midnight Cowboy (1969) and Coming Home (1978).

== Early life and career ==
Salt was born in Chicago, Illinois, the son of Winifred May (née Porter) and William H. Salt, a playwright and artist. Waldo graduated from Stanford University in 1934. He was hired as a junior writer for Metro-Goldwyn-Mayer. The first of the nineteen films he wrote or co-wrote was The Bride Wore Red (1937). He received his first screenplay credit for The Shopworn Angel (1938).

Salt's career in Hollywood was interrupted in 1951 when he was blacklisted after being labeled a Communist by screenwriter Richard Collins. On April 13, 1951, in his testimony before the House Committee on Un-American Activities, Salt invoked the Fifth Amendment rather than answer whether he was a member of the Communist Party. Although he could no longer work openly in film or television, he was still able like other blacklisted writers to earn money by writing under a pseudonym, which he did for the British TV series The Adventures of Robin Hood.

After the blacklist ended, Salt won Academy Awards for Best Writing, Screenplay Based on Material from Another Medium and Best Writing, Screenplay Written Directly for the Screen for his work on Midnight Cowboy and Coming Home respectively, as well as earning a nomination for the former for Serpico.

Salt is featured in the extras for the Criterion Collection's Midnight Cowboy Blu-ray disc release, specifically in an audio interview with Michael Childers; many photos of Salt can be seen here as he was a collaborator for the screenplay. The documentary listed below, Waldo Salt: A Screenwriter's Journey, is also featured on the disc.

== Personal life ==
Salt was married four times. The first was to Ambur Dana, who later married Nat Hiken, then to actress Mary Davenport (married in 1942) with whom he had two children, actress/writer/producer Jennifer, and Deborah; both marriages ended in divorce. After his divorce from Davenport, he married Gladys Schwartz in 1969, and they remained together until her death in 1981. He was married to playwright Eve Merriam from 1983 until his death at age 72 in Los Angeles on March 7, 1987.

He joined the Communist Party USA in 1938 (or 1939) and left in 1955.

== Documentary ==
Salt was the subject of a 1990 documentary Waldo Salt: A Screenwriter's Journey, which featured interviews with Dustin Hoffman, Robert Redford, Jon Voight, John Schlesinger and other collaborators and friends.

== The Waldo Salt Screenwriting Award ==
The Waldo Salt Screenwriting Award, first presented in 1992, is awarded at the Sundance Film Festival annually. It is determined by the dramatic jury, and recognizes outstanding screenwriting in a film screened at the festival that year.

== Filmography ==
Films
Year	Title	Notes
1937	The Bride Wore Red	Adaptation, uncredited
1938	The Shopworn Angel	Screenplay
1939	The Adventures of Huckleberry Finn	Dialogue, uncredited
1940	The Philadelphia Story	Uncredited
1941	The Wild Man of Borneo	Screenplay
1943	Tonight We Raid Calais	Screenplay
1944	Mr. Winkle Goes to War	Alternative title: Arms and the Woman
1948	Rachel and the Stranger	Screenplay
1950	The Flame and the Arrow	Screenplay
1951	M	Additional dialogue
1961	Blast of Silence	Narration written by, credited as Mel Davenport
1962	Taras Bulba	Screenplay together with Karl Tunberg
1964	Flight from Ashiya	Alternative title: Ashiya kara no hiko
1964	Wild and Wonderful	
1969	Midnight Cowboy	Screenplay; Oscar winner for Best Adapted Screenplay
1971	The Gang That Couldn't Shoot Straight	Alternative title: The Gang That Couldn't Shoot
1973	Serpico	Screenplay
1975	The Day of the Locust	Screenplay
1978	Coming Home	Oscar Winner for Best Original Screenplay
Television
Year	Title	Notes
1955	Star Stage	1 episode
1956	Colonel March of Scotland Yard	2 episodes
1958	Swiss Family Robinson	Television movie, credited as Mel Davenport
1958	Ivanhoe	4 episodes
1961	Tallahassee 7000	1 episode
1964	Espionage	1 episode, credited as Mel Davenport
1965	The Nurses	1 episode
1967	Coronet Blue	1 episode

== Awards and nominations ==
Year	Award	Result	Category	Film or series
1949	Writers Guild of America Award	Nominated	Best Written American Western	Rachel and the Stranger
1970	Writers Guild of America Award	Won	Best Drama Adapted from Another Medium	Midnight Cowboy
1974	Writers Guild of America Award	Won	Best Drama Adapted from Another Medium	Serpico (Shared with Norman Wexler)
1979	Writers Guild of America Award	Won	Best Drama Written Directly for the Screen	Coming Home (Shared with Robert C. Jones)
1986	Writers Guild of America Award	Won	Laurel Award for Screenwriting Achievement	-
1970	Academy Award	Won	Best Writing, Screenplay Based on Material from Another Medium	Midnight Cowboy
1974	Academy Award	Nominated	Best Writing, Screenplay Based on Material from Another Medium	Serpico (Shared with Norman Wexler)
1979	Academy Award	Won	Best Writing, Screenplay Written Directly for the Screen	Coming Home (Shared with Nancy Dowd and Robert C. Jones)
1970	BAFTA Award	Won	Best Screenplay	Midnight Cowboy
1974	Edgar Allan Poe Awards	Nominated	Serpico (Shared with Norman Wexler)	
1970	Golden Globe Award	Nominated	Best Screenplay	Midnight Cowboy
1979	Golden Globe Award	Nominated	Best Screenplay - Motion Picture	Coming Home (Shared with Robert C. Jones)
