= Solo Trans =

- LaserDisc Front Cover
- Directed by: Hal Ashby
- Written by: Newell Alexander; L.A. Johnson; Neil Young
- Produced by: Jeanne Field; L.A. Johnson; Elliot Rabinowitz; Neil Young
- Starring: Newell Alexander; Inez Drummond; Craig Hayes; Rosemarie Lovell; Connie Simmons; Neil Young; Pegi Young
- Cinematography: Bobby Byrne
- Edited by: L.A. Johnson; Norm Levy; Elon Soltes; Jim Prior; Neil Young
- Music by: Neil Young; Elliot Mazer; Tim Mulligan
- Release date: 1984
- Running time: 60 minutes
- Language: English

Solo Trans is a concert film by Neil Young, directed by Hal Ashby and released in 1984. It was recorded at the Hara Arena in Dayton, Ohio on September 18, 1983, during Young's Solo Trans tour. Originally released on only LaserDisc, the film went out of print until 2024, when it was included on Blu-ray in Neil Young Archives Volume III: 1976–1987. The film also saw a release on Neil Young's online archive on November 16, 2019.

== Information ==
During a typical show, a "live" video broadcast made up of various video clips from Young's career, old TV shows, and commercials were played on a giant screen in the background, dubbed Trans TV. This film is presented as an episode of Trans TV. After Young would finish his "solo" portion of the show, The Shocking Pinks would come out for the encore, as he was promoting Everybody's Rockin' at the time. As the tour progressed, Young got more and more into making the encore section a full-on stage act. Friends and family were called in for parts, such as The Pinkettes, The Shocking Pinks' squad of cheerleaders, consisting of Young's wife Pegi, bass player Tim Drummond's wife Inez and three other young women. Bandmate Ben Keith's lawyer Craig Hayes was brought in to play Vito Toledo, the Pinks' fictional manager. Young would revisit this territory years later with the stage show for his Greendale album.

Notable songs included in the film are "I Got a Problem", a Synclavier piece which appeared three years later on Landing on Water, as well as "Get Gone" and "Don't Take Your Love Away from Me", which were not released until 1993 on the compilation Lucky Thirteen. The song "Do You Wanna Dance?", a frequent cover during Shocking Pinks shows, was never released in another format.

== Track listing ==
1. "Heart of Gold"
2. "Old Man"
3. "Helpless"
4. "Ohio"
5. "Don't Be Denied"
6. "I Got a Problem"
7. "Hello Mr. Soul"
8. "Payola Blues"
9. "Get Gone"
10. "Don't Take Your Love Away from Me"
11. "Do You Wanna Dance?"

== Additional songs played during the concert but not included in the movie ==
1. "Comes A Time"
2. "Love Is A Rose"
3. "Down By The River"
4. "Too Far Gone"
5. "Only Love Can Break Your Heart"
6. "Old Ways"
7. "Dance Dance Dance"
8. "Sail Away"
9. "Powderfinger"
10. "After The Gold Rush"
11. "My My, Hey Hey (Out Of The Blue)"
12. "Sugar Mountain"
13. "Jellyroll Man"
14. "Wonderin'"
15. "Everybody's Rockin'"
