= George Davis (author) =

George Davis (November 29, 1939), professor emeritus in creative writing at the Newark, New Jersey campus of Rutgers University, is an African American novelist. He is best known for his Vietnam War novel, Coming Home (Random House, 1972), and his creative nonfiction book, Black Life in Corporate America (with Glegg Watson, Doubleday, 1982).

== Biography ==
Davis was born in Shepherdstown, WV, to Clarence Davis, a Methodist preacher, and Winnie (Ross) Davis. He is a descendant of Henry Davis, who escaped slavery in North Carolina in the 1850s and became a preacher in Baltimore around the time of the American Civil War. Davis grew up in a half dozen small towns in West Virginia, Virginia, and Maryland, where his father was pastor of a series of mostly rural churches. With the coming of the Civil Rights Movement, Davis and his next older brother, Vernon, racially integrated Wheeling High School in Wheeling, West Virginia (1954), and later Davis and several other African American students integrated schools in Baltimore, Maryland (1955), which was then the largest racially segregated school system in the nation. Contemporary Authors New Revision Series, Vol. 9, Gale, 1983.

After graduation from Baltimore City College (a high school), he enrolled in Colgate University (1957). He spent the summer of his junior year with Operations Crossroads Africa in the Niger River Delta of Nigeria, participating in village life and helping to build a wall to protect the village of Akubene (citation from village elders) from seasonal flooding (Modern Melting Pot, Psychology Today). He received a Master of Fine Arts degree from Columbia University in creative writing and film. Coming Home was his master’s thesis, which Random House published in 1972, less than a year after his graduation. He stayed on to teach the John Oliver Killens Writing Workshop at Columbia for two terms.

== Career ==
Between graduation from Colgate and enrollment in Columbia, Davis joined his brother Vernon in Savannah, Georgia, one of the primary battlefronts of the Civil Rights Movement. He left Savannah later the same year (1961) to join the United States Air Force. As a member of an air crew on 7-day alert tours of duty in concrete bunkers in Alaska and Greenland, he started taking notes for a novel. The theme of the novel was that while American crews were underground, ready at a moment’s notice to get airborne to fly across the North Pole to defeat Russia, the nation’s real enemies were in the bunkers. The enemies were the racial misconceptions inside the crew members themselves. The novel, The Cold War Soldier, was never published but was eventually adapted as part of Davis’ first published novel, Coming Home. (Interview with the author) According to WorldCat, the book is held in 417 libraries.

In the Air Force Davis rose to the rank of captain and flew 47 missions during the Vietnam War. Coming Home was based on this experience. After Vietnam, he went to work as a reporter for The Washington Post in 1968 and in less than a year rose to the post of day city editor. He moved to The New York Times in 1969 to become an editor in the Sunday Arts and Leisure Section. After the publication of the novel, he left journalism and took a job at Bronx Community College of the City University of New York to support himself and family while establishing his writing career.

== Books ==
- Coming Home, Random House, 1971.
- Love, Black Love, Doubleday, 1978.
- Black Life in Corporate America: Swimming in the Mainstream, Doubleday, 1982. (With Glegg Watson)
- Spiritual Intelligence (monogram) 2005
- Soul Vibrations: Astrology for African Americans, Quill, 1996. (With Gilda Mathews)
- Alex and the Search for God Within
- Love Lessons: African Americans and Sex, Romance, and Marriage in the Nineties, William Morrow, 1998.
- Barack Obama, America and the World, Here Books, 2011
- The Melting Points, Here Books, 2012
- Spiritual Intelligence, Here Books 2012

== Major Reviews ==
- Publishers Weekly, June 18, 1982, p. 67; December 22, 1997, p. 48.
- Black Enterprise, June 1983, p. 27.
- Library Journal, August, 1982, p. 1456.
- Los Angeles Times, September 9, 1982.
- Newsweek, April 6, 1970.
- New York Times Book Review, October 24, 1982, p. 12.
- The New York Times Book Review, Jan 9, 1972
- The Nation, March 6, 1972
