= Lookin' to Get Out =

1982 American comedy film

- Promotional movie poster for the film
- Directed by: Hal Ashby
- Written by: Al Schwartz; Jon Voight
- Produced by: Andrew Braunsberg; Robert Schaffel; Edward Teets
- Starring: Jon Voight; Ann-Margret; Burt Young
- Cinematography: Haskell Wexler
- Edited by: Robert C. Jones
- Music by: Miles Goodman; Johnny Mandel; John Beal
- Production company: Lorimar
- Distributed by: Paramount Pictures
- Release date: October 8, 1982 (United States)
- Running time: 105 minutes
- Country: United States
- Language: English
- Budget: $17,000,000
- Box office: $946,461

Lookin’ to Get Out is a 1982 American comedy film, directed by Hal Ashby and written by Al Schwartz and Jon Voight, who also stars. The film also stars Ann-Margret and Burt Young. Voight's daughter, Angelina Jolie, then seven years old, makes her acting debut.

== Plot ==
Alex Kovac, playing poker in New York City, drops $10,000 to gamblers Joey and Harry that he can not pay back. Alex persuades pal Jerry Feldman to hop on a plane to Las Vegas with him and try to win $10,000 to pay off the debt.

Finding out that a similarly named Jerry Feldman is a regular there, Jerry is comped $10,000 by the casino, no questions asked. A room and other perks go along with the comp. A waiter named Smitty, an old acquaintance of Alex's, is an expert card counter, so he is staked to a high-limit blackjack game by the guys.

Patti Warner, a former girlfriend of Alex's, is now the mistress of the casino's boss. Their mutual attraction returns, but trouble follows after a $500,000 victory at the tables, not only from the casino but from Joey and Harry, who have come to Vegas looking to get their money or get even.

== Cast ==
- Jon Voight as Alex Kovac
- Ann-Margret as Patti Warner
- Burt Young as Jerry Feldman
- Jude Ferrese as Harry
- Allen Keller as Joey
- Bert Remsen as Smitty
- Richard Bradford as Bernie Gold

In addition, Voight's then seven-year-old daughter, Angelina Jolie (credited as Angelina Jolie Voight), made her acting debut with a brief appearance as Tosh, the daughter of Alex and Patti, near the end of the movie. Among the Las Vegas acts seen performing at the MGM Grand during the film are Siegfried & Roy (credited as magicians Siegfried and Roy Enterprises).

== Production ==
The film was Voight's screenwriting debut.

After initial delays, the film started principal photography in May 1980. Production was interrupted for five months due to an actors' strike.

Director Ashby had notorious bouts with the studio and recut the film for himself before it was taken from his hands and recut by the studio, with Voight working with editor Bob Jones on trying to come up with a satisfactory edit, which was 15 minutes shorter and not particularly liked by Voight. Nick Dawson, in his research for his biography of Ashby (Being Hal Ashby: Life of a Hollywood Rebel), discovered that Ashby had re-cut the film and donated it to UCLA prior to his 1988 death. This was brought to the attention of Warner Home Video who released the Ashby Director's Cut on DVD on June 30, 2009.

The filming took place in Las Vegas, including the MGM Grand Las Vegas and Variety noted in their review the "shameless plugging for the MGM leisure palace and its entertainment shows (particularly Siegfried & Roy's magic acts)."

== Release ==
The film was initially due to be released by United Artists but Lorimar's deal with UA expired before the film was released and Paramount Pictures acquired the film as part of a package to distribute Lorimar product.

The film received poor reviews. Variety called it "an ill-conceived vehicle for actor (and cowriter) Jon Voight to showcase his character comedy talents in a loose, semi-improvised environment." They noted that "Voight and Young are an entertaining team, but presented in an untenable vehicle".

The film was released on October 8, 1982, in 850 theaters, and due to its poor performance, Lorimar made a $6.2 million write-off.

== See also ==
- List of films set in Las Vegas
