= Shampoo (film) =

1975 film directed by Hal Ashby

- Theatrical release poster
- Directed by: Hal Ashby
- Written by: Robert Towne; Warren Beatty
- Produced by: Warren Beatty
- Starring: Warren Beatty; Julie Christie; Goldie Hawn; Lee Grant; Jack Warden; Tony Bill
- Cinematography: László Kovács
- Edited by: Robert C. Jones
- Music by: Paul Simon
- Production company: Rubeeker Films
- Distributed by: Columbia Pictures
- Release date: February 11, 1975
- Running time: 110 minutes
- Country: United States
- Language: English
- Budget: $4 million
- Box office: $60 million

Shampoo is a 1975 American comedy film directed by Hal Ashby and starring Warren Beatty, Julie Christie, Goldie Hawn, Lee Grant, Jack Warden, and Tony Bill, as well as Carrie Fisher in her film debut. Co-written by Beatty and Robert Towne, the film follows a promiscuous Los Angeles hairdresser on Election Day 1968, as he juggles his relationships with several women. The film is a satire focusing on the theme of sexual politics and late-1960s sexual and social mores.

== Plot ==
On the eve of the 1968 presidential election, successful Beverly Hills hairdresser George Roundy meets with Felicia, one of his several clients/sexual partners, at his apartment. During sex, he receives a phone call from Jill, his naive, younger, up-and-coming actress girlfriend, who is suffering a panic attack, paranoid that an intruder is in her home. George rushes from his house to calm Jill, which frustrates Felicia.

George's occupation and charisma have provided him the perfect platform from which to meet and bed beautiful women, including his current girlfriend. Despite this, 34-year-old George is dissatisfied with his professional life; he is the creative star of the salon in which he works, but has to play second fiddle to Norman, the "nickel-and-diming" mediocre hairdresser who owns the business.

George dreams of setting up his own salon business but cannot convince any bank to lend him the capital he needs. He seeks out Felicia and her unsuspecting husband Lester to bankroll him. George's meeting with Lester supplies a second secret for him to keep from his would-be benefactor; Lester's current mistress, Jackie, is George's former girlfriend, perhaps the most serious relationship he has ever had. Jackie is also best friends with Jill, making the situation even more complicated.

Jackie arranges for George to style her hair, which he fashions nearly identically to Felicia's. Sexual tension arises between the two, and George attempts to kiss Jackie. At first, Jackie rebuffs George, but then kisses him back. They are about to have sex in the bathroom when they hear Lester announce his arrival. As Lester comes into the room, they pretend for his benefit that George is finishing styling Jackie's hair.

Lester, who assumes George is gay because of his profession, asks George to escort Jackie to a Republican election-night soiree. Upon arriving, George finds himself in the same room as a number of present and former sexual partners, including Jill (who came with Johnny Pope, a film director considering her for a role in his next film) and Felicia. Jackie becomes upset, drinks too much, and behaves outrageously, so Lester asks George to take her home, but she refuses to go.

All the principals except Felicia adjourn to a posh counterculture party at a Beverly Hills mansion, where guests indulge in alcohol, drugs and sexual pursuits. Lester, followed moments later by Jill and Johnny, happen upon a couple having vigorous sex in the dark on the kitchen floor. Lester comments admiringly on this tryst to Jill and Johnny, who look on through the window in stunned silence. Suddenly, the refrigerator door George had failed to properly close comes open, illuminating him and Jackie having intercourse. Lester, shocked, abruptly leaves. An enraged Jill throws a chair, breaking the window, and swears at George. Jackie flees as George tries to placate Jill with an obvious lie, but Jill, unmollified, runs off to spend the night with Johnny.

The following morning, Jill confronts George at her home with one of Felicia's earrings, which she found in his bed. When she asks about his dalliances, George admits he sought a career in the beauty industry as a means to pursue beautiful women, and that his promiscuity, while making him feel like he will live forever, may mean he does not love her. Upon returning to his home, George is met by Lester and some intimidating men. George and Lester soon find mutual understanding. Lester hypocritically calls Jackie a whore and mentions he is fed up with her. Lester promises George a business deal and he and the men leave.

George subsequently goes to Jackie's house, but she worriedly flees in her car, claiming she does not want Lester to find them together. George pursues her on his motorcycle, and the two arrive on a hilltop overlook above her house. George proposes to Jackie, but she tells him it is too late; she has arranged to go to Acapulco with Lester, who has said he will divorce Felicia and marry her. Jackie leaves George alone on the overlook, from where he sadly watches her depart with Lester.

== Cast ==
- Warren Beatty as George Roundy
- Julie Christie as Jackie Shawn
- Goldie Hawn as Jill Haynes
- Lee Grant as Felicia Karpf
- Jack Warden as Lester Karpf
- Tony Bill as Johnny Pope
- Jay Robinson as Norman
- George Furth as Mr. Pettis
- Randy Scheer as Dennis Lolly
- Susanna Moore as Gloria
- Carrie Fisher as Lorna Karpf
- Kathleen Miller as Anjanette
- Luana Anders as Devra
- Mike Olton as Ricci
- Brunetta Barnett as Mona
- Richard E. Kalk as Detective Younger
- Brad Dexter as Senator East
- William Castle as Sid Roth
- Howard Hesseman as Red Dog
- Michelle Phillips as Girl at Party
- Susan Blakely as Girl on the Street
- Cynthia Wood as Beauty Shop Customer

== Lawsuit ==
Bernice Mann, a former manicurist, was awarded $185,000 on June 15, 1979 following a civil suit in Los Angeles Superior Court where a jury found that Beatty, Towne and Columbia Pictures took some of the ideas for the film from her script for Women Plus that she had submitted to the studio. Columbia claimed that they had no record of receiving the script and Beatty and Towne denied the charges.

== Analysis ==
Film scholar Emanuel Levy describes Shampoo as a critique of suburbia, comparing its self-contained Beverly Hills setting to the small towns depicted in films such as Jaws and The Stepford Wives (both also released in 1975). He elaborates on the film's political themes:

Made in 1975, less than a year after [Richard] Nixon's resignation (August 1974) over the Watergate scandal, the film suggests parallels between Nixon's hypocrisy and cheating and similar devices among the average Americans... The TV set is on most of the time, but no one has time to really watch, reducing the screen to a constant blur of images and sounds... The film suggests that Americans have become slaves to their private and sexual lives at the expense of getting involved emotionally or politically. No character talks about or understands politics. Shampoo is about whoring in sex and in politics, and the price of doing it.

== Soundtrack ==
The soundtrack includes songs from its setting of the late 1960s. Included in the party sequence are the Beatles ("Sgt. Pepper's Lonely Hearts Club Band" and "Lucy in the Sky with Diamonds"), Buffalo Springfield ("Mr. Soul"), Jefferson Airplane ("Plastic Fantastic Lover" and "Good Shepherd"), and Jimi Hendrix ("Manic Depression"). Also included in the soundtrack album is "Wouldn't It Be Nice" by the Beach Boys, which plays over the opening and closing credits of the film. The final scene is accompanied by Paul Simon singing the music (without lyrics) of his song Silent Eyes, which was composed for the film and for which Beatty reportedly paid him $50,000 ($302,289 in 2025 dollars).

The appearance of the two Jefferson Airplane songs in the movie is slightly anachronistic, as Shampoo takes place in November 1968, while "Good Shepherd" was included on the Jefferson Airplane album Volunteers, released in 1969, and the version of "Plastic Fantastic Lover" is taken off the live Jefferson Airplane album Bless Its Pointed Little Head, also released in 1969.

== Release ==
A screening of Shampoo was held in New York City on February 10, 1975. The guests included Warren Beatty, Andy Warhol, Salvador Dali, Amanda Lear, Sylvia Miles, John Fairchild, and Maureen Stapleton.

The film premiered in New York City on February 11, 1975.

== Reception ==
=== Critical response ===
On the review aggregator website Rotten Tomatoes, 75% of 107 critics' reviews are positive. The website's consensus reads: "Shampoo trains a darkly comic lens on post-Nixon America, aiming at -- and often hitting -- an array of timely targets." Metacritic, which uses a weighted average, assigned the film a score of 65 out of 100, based on 11 critics, indicating "generally favorable" reviews.

Critic Pauline Kael of The New Yorker gave the film an overall positive review claiming the film is "a bigger picture in retrospect," while Walter Goodman of The New York Times said that "Ashby shows that he has a good memory for a couple of decades of cinematic clichés." Bob Colacello of Interview said that Shampoo is "the best movie to come out of New Hollywood yet."

Conversely, Roger Ebert gave the film 2.5 out of 4 stars and wrote: "Shampoo is a movie I expected to admire enormously. It was made by some of Hollywood's most gifted talents, and the critical praise from New York has been almost deafening. But the movie didn't quite work for me. Its timing wasn't confident enough to pull off its ambitious conception. It wasn't as funny as it could have been in the funny places… and it's not as poignant as it could be in its moments of truth, because we can see the wheels turning."

=== Box office ===
Commercially, Shampoo was a great success. Produced on a budget of $4 million, the film grossed $49,407,734 domestically and $60 million at the worldwide box office. It earned an estimated $23.9 million in North American rentals, making it the third-highest-grossing film of 1975, beaten only by Jaws and One Flew Over the Cuckoo's Nest.

=== Accolades ===
Award	Category	Nominee(s)	Result	Ref.
Academy Awards	Best Supporting Actor	Jack Warden	Nominated	
Academy Awards	Best Supporting Actress	Lee Grant	Won	
Academy Awards	Best Original Screenplay	Robert Towne and Warren Beatty	Nominated	
Academy Awards	Best Art Direction	Art Direction: Richard Sylbert and W. Stewart Campbell; Set Decoration: George Gaines	Nominated	
British Academy Film Awards	Best Actor in a Supporting Role	Jack Warden	Nominated	
Golden Globe Awards	Best Motion Picture – Musical or Comedy		Nominated	
Golden Globe Awards	Best Actor in a Motion Picture – Musical or Comedy	Warren Beatty	Nominated	
Golden Globe Awards	Best Actress in a Motion Picture – Musical or Comedy	Julie Christie	Nominated	
Golden Globe Awards	Best Actress in a Motion Picture – Musical or Comedy	Goldie Hawn	Nominated	
Golden Globe Awards	Best Supporting Actress – Motion Picture	Lee Grant	Nominated	
National Society of Film Critics Awards	Best Screenplay	Robert Towne and Warren Beatty	Won	
New York Film Critics Circle Awards	Best Screenplay	Robert Towne and Warren Beatty	Nominated	
Writers Guild of America Awards	Best Comedy – Written Directly for the Screen	Robert Towne and Warren Beatty	Won	

== Legacy ==
The film is recognized by American Film Institute in these lists:

- 2000: AFI's 100 Years...100 Laughs – #47

Sony Pictures Home Entertainment released Shampoo on DVD in January 2003. On October 16, 2018, The Criterion Collection re-released the film on Blu-ray and DVD in a special edition, featuring a new 4K scan of the original film elements.

Shampoo also served as the inspiration for the 1976 exploitation film Black Shampoo, directed by Greydon Clark, which is an example of the common blaxploitation filmmaking technique of intentionally piggybacking on the titles of hit films starring predominantly white casts to provide predominantly African American "alternatives" to the earlier films; Clark explained in an interview that his reason for making a blaxploitation film about a black male hairdresser's sexual trysts patterned after Ashby's film was that Clark did not want to make a film about a pimp, private detective, or drug dealer, who were often the protagonists of blaxploitation films.

== See also ==
- List of American films of 1975
