= Hal Ashby =

American film director and editor (1929–1988)

- Ashby directing Bound for Glory (1976)
- Born: William Hal Ashby; September 2, 1929; Ogden, Utah, U.S.
- Died: December 27, 1988 (aged 59); Malibu, California, U.S.
- Occupations: Film director; editor
- Years active: 1956–1988
- Spouses: Lavon Compton (m. 1947; div. 1948); Maxine Marie Armstrong (m. 1949; div. 1950); Maloy "Mickey" Joan Bartron (m. 1956; div. 1963); Shirley Stockman (m. 1963; div. 1968); Joan Marshall (m. 1969; div. 1970)

William Hal Ashby (September 2, 1929 – December 27, 1988) was an American film director and editor. His work exemplified the countercultural attitude of the era. He directed wide-ranging films featuring iconic performances. He is associated with the New Hollywood wave of filmmaking with filmmakers such as Martin Scorsese, Woody Allen, Mike Nichols and Sidney Lumet.

Before his career as a director, Ashby edited films for Norman Jewison, notably The Russians Are Coming, the Russians Are Coming (1966), which earned Ashby an Oscar nomination for Best Editing, and In the Heat of the Night (1967), which earned him his only Oscar for the same category. Ashby received a third Oscar nomination, this time for Best Director for Coming Home (1978). Other films directed by Ashby include The Landlord (1970), Harold and Maude (1971), The Last Detail (1973), Shampoo (1975), Bound for Glory (1976), and Being There (1979). Harold and Maude and Being There have been inducted into the National Film Registry.

== Early life and education ==
Ashby was born September 2, 1929, in Ogden, Utah, the youngest of four siblings born to Mormon parents Eileen Ireta (née Hetzler) and James Thomas Ashby, a dairy farm owner. Ashby's parents divorced in 1936, after which his father remarried.

Following the divorce, Ashby and his siblings lived with their mother, briefly in Logan, Utah, before relocating to Portland, Oregon, where his elder brother took a job in the timber industry. His mother, a cooking enthusiast, opened a restaurant in Portland. After several years in Portland, the family returned to Ogden, where Ashby primarily lived with his father. When Ashby was 12 years old, his father died by suicide.

== Career ==
=== 1967–1978: Breakthrough and stardom ===
As Ashby was entering adult life, he moved from Utah to Los Angeles, California, where he pursued a bohemian lifestyle and ultimately became an assistant film editor through a long apprenticeship. His career gained momentum when he served as the editor of The Loved One (1965), an adaptation of the Evelyn Waugh novel that involved such New Hollywood contemporaries as screenwriter Terry Southern and cinematographer Haskell Wexler. After being nominated for the Academy Award for Film Editing in 1967 for The Russians Are Coming, the Russians Are Coming, Ashby's big break occurred one year later when he won the award for In the Heat of the Night. Ashby often stated that the practice of editing provided him with the best filmmaking background outside of traditional university study and carried the techniques learned as an editor with him when he began directing.

At the urging of mentor Norman Jewison, Ashby directed his first film, The Landlord—an early rumination on the social dynamics of gentrification in Park Slope, Brooklyn—in 1970. While his birth date placed him within the Silent Generation, the filmmaker (who had been a habitual marijuana smoker since 1950), eagerly embraced the hippie lifestyle, adopting vegetarianism and growing his hair long before it became de rigueur.

Over the next ten years, Ashby directed several acclaimed and popular films. Many were about outsiders and adventurers traversing the pathways of life. They included the off-beat romance Harold and Maude (1971), The Last Detail (1973), and the social satire Being There (1979), with Peter Sellers, giving the star a well-received role after many felt he had lapsed into self-parody. Ashby's most significant commercial success was Shampoo (1975), a collaboration with Warren Beatty and Robert Towne that satirized late-1960s sexual and social mores through the life of a hairdresser modeled after such contemporaneous figures as Jay Sebring and Jon Peters. Bound for Glory (1976), a muted biography of Woody Guthrie starring David Carradine, was the first film to use a Steadicam.

In June 1973, Michael Douglas and Saul Zaentz hired Ashby to direct One Flew Over the Cuckoo's Nest, after the original director Miloš Forman became unavailable due to the reimposition of censorship in his native Czechoslovakia after the Warsaw Pact invasion of Czechoslovakia and after Forman's initial replacement Richard Rush was unable to secure studio funding. Ashby was responsible for casting Jack Nicholson as R.P. McMurphy, but this resulted in a nine-month delay during which Forman fled to the United States and was rehired as director.

Aside from Shampoo, Ashby's most commercially successful film was the Vietnam War drama Coming Home (1978). Starring Jane Fonda and Jon Voight, both in Academy Award-winning performances, it was for this film that Ashby earned his only Best Director Oscar nomination. Arriving in the post-Jaws and Star Wars era, Coming Home was one of the last films to encapsulate the modestly budgeted, socially realistic ethos of the New Hollywood era, earning nearly $15 million in returns and rentals on a $3 million budget.

=== 1979–1988: Later films ===
Because of his critical success and dependable profitability, shortly after the success of Coming Home, Ashby was able to form a production company, Northstar, under the auspices of Lorimar. After Being There, Ashby became more reclusive, often retreating to his home in Malibu Colony, a gated enclave in the city. Later, it was widely rumored in a likely whisper campaign from Lorimar (whose executives clashed with the director) that Ashby had become dependent upon cocaine, a drug that he only used intermittently after the production of Bound for Glory. As a consequence of these rumors, he slowly became unemployable. Eva Gardos, an editor who worked with Ashby during the period, has asserted that his drug intake remained largely confined to marijuana and psilocybin.

Following Being There, Ashby was provisionally set to reunite with Sellers and Terry Southern on Grossing Out, a black comedy inspired by the actor's chance meeting with an international arms dealer on an airplane. Although Southern (who had not had a screenplay go to production in a decade) was rejuvenated by the prospect of working with the duo and produced a script that was said to be on par with his 1960s oeuvre, the project went into development hell after Sellers's sudden death from a heart attack in July 1980. During this period, there were the productions of Second-Hand Hearts and Lookin' to Get Out. The latter, a Las Vegas caper that reunited him with Voight and featured Voight's young daughter, Angelina Jolie, was plagued by the increasingly strained relationship between Ashby and Lorimar. Filmed in 1979, Second-Hand Hearts only received a poorly reviewed limited release in 1981 before being pulled from circulation for nearly thirty years. Belatedly released in October 1982, Lookin' to Get Out earned a little under $1 million in returns and rentals on an estimated $17 million budget. During this period, Lorimar executives grew less tolerant of his increasingly perfectionist production (811,000 feet of film were used shooting Lookin' to Get Out) and editing techniques, a montage in the latter film set to The Police's "Message in a Bottle" took six months to perfect but proved to be logistically unusable due to a Lorimar agreement with the American Federation of Musicians.

Initially set to helm Tootsie after two years of negotiations and Ashby-directed wig and makeup tests, Lorimar executives blocked him from working on the film because part of the pre-production period overlapped with final work on the long-gestating Lookin' to Get Out, which was eventually recut by the studio when Ashby's work was deemed to be unsatisfactory. (Decades later, Ashby's cut was rediscovered and released on DVD in 2009.) As Dustin Hoffman had not offered a "formal commitment" to the production at the time of Ashby's dismissal, the director forfeited his $1.5 million fee. While post-production of Lookin' to Get Out continued, Lorimar permitted Ashby to film The Rolling Stones' 1981 American tour documentary, Let's Spend the Night Together, the director was a longtime fan of the group. He collapsed before the final filmed concert at Sun Devil Stadium in Tempe, Arizona, on December 13, 1981. Although Jeff Wexler said Ashby was "partying way beyond his capabilities with the Stones," Caleb Deschanel has said that Ashby (who directed the concert shoot on a gurney) simply had the flu. The film was well-received but gained little traction during a limited theatrical release. In September 1983, Ashby directed Solo Trans, a Neil Young concert video that was released the following year.

The Slugger's Wife, with a screenplay written by Neil Simon, was a critical and commercial failure. Ashby (whose cocaine use had accelerated throughout the shoot) was fired after delivering a 20-minute rough cut of the beginning of the film that included almost no dialogue. When the Oliver Stone-written 8 Million Ways to Die fared similarly at the box office, Ashby's post-production process was considered to be such a liability that he was fired by the production company on the final day of principal photography.

Attempting to turn a corner in his declining career, Ashby stopped using drugs, trimmed his hair and beard, and began to frequently attend Hollywood parties wearing a navy-blue blazer so as to suggest that he was once again employable. Despite these efforts, he could only find work as a television director, helming one of three pilots for Beverly Hills Buntz, an unsuccessful Hill Street Blues spinoff starring Dennis Franz. He also directed Jake's Journey, a sword and sorcery fantasy conceived by Graham Chapman.

== Personal life and death ==
Longtime friend Warren Beatty advised Ashby to seek medical care after he complained of various ailments, including undiagnosed phlebitis. He was soon diagnosed with pancreatic cancer that rapidly spread to his lungs, colon, and liver. In the last five months of his life, he had been in and out of hospitals for treatment; he had been working on developing a film called Hand Carved Coffins even when sick. Ashby died on December 27, 1988, at his home in Malibu, California.

== Influence and legacy ==
The Last Detail, Bound for Glory, Coming Home, and Being There were all nominated for the Palme d'Or.

American songwriter and guitarist Guthrie Thomas, who coordinated the music in Bound for Glory and acted in the film, called Ashby "one of the finest motion picture directors of the 20th century."

Michael Cimino's 1996 film The Sunchaser, about a teenager with pancreatic cancer who refuses medical treatment, was dedicated to Ashby.

For the 2012 Sight & Sound Directors Top Ten poll Niki Caro, Cyrus Frisch, and Wanuri Kahiu voted for Harold and Maude, with Frisch describing the film as "an encouragement to think beyond the obvious!"

A 2018 documentary about the director was screened at the Sundance Film Festival. The moving image collection of Hal Ashby is held at the Academy Film Archive. The material at the Academy Film Archive is also complemented by material in the Hal Ashby papers at the academy's Margaret Herrick Library.

Hal Ashby has been an influence to the melodic post-hardcore band Touche Amore. He is referenced in the 3rd song "Hal Ashby", of their album "Spiral in a Straight Line" in the lyrics (“a misguided Hal Ashby catastrophe”).

== Filmography ==
=== As director ===
Title	Year	Notes
The Landlord	1970	Cameo: Groom in opening shot
Harold and Maude	1971	Cameo: Man watching model train
The Last Detail	1973	Cameo: Man at bar
Shampoo	1975	
Bound for Glory	1976	
Coming Home	1978	Cameo: Man doing a peace sign
Being There	1979	Cameo: Washington Post worker
Second-Hand Hearts	1981	
Lookin' to Get Out	1982	Cameo: Man on television
Let's Spend the Night Together	1983	Concert film
Solo Trans	1984	Concert film
The Slugger's Wife	1985	
8 Million Ways to Die	1986	

=== Other film work ===
Title	Year	Credited as		Notes
Title	Year	Editor	Other	Notes
Friendly Persuasion	1956		Yes	Uncredited assistant editor
The Big Country	1958		Yes	Uncredited assistant editor
Tokyo After Dark	1959		Yes	Uncredited assistant editor
The Diary of Anne Frank	1959		Yes	Uncredited assistant editor
The Young Doctors	1961		Yes	Editorial consultant
The Children's Hour	1961		Yes	Assistant editor
Captain Sindbad	1963		Yes	Assistant editor
The Best Man	1964		Yes	Editorial consultant
The Greatest Story Ever Told	1965		Yes	Uncredited assistant editor
The Loved One	1965	Yes		
The Cincinnati Kid	1965	Yes		With Brian Smedley-Aston
The Russians Are Coming, the Russians Are Coming	1966	Yes		With J. Terry Williams
In the Heat of the Night	1967	Yes		
The Thomas Crown Affair	1968	Yes	Yes	With Ralph E. Winters & Byron Brandt; Also associate producer
Gaily, Gaily	1969	Yes	Yes	With Ralph E. Winters & Byron Brandt; Also associate producer

=== Television ===
Title	Year	Credited as	Notes
Title	Year	Director	Notes
Beverly Hills Buntz	1987	Yes	Episode: "Pilot"
Jake's Journey	1988	Yes	Television pilot

== Awards and nominations ==
Year	Association	Category	Project	Result	Ref.
1966	Academy Awards	Best Film Editing	The Russians Are Coming, The Russians Are Coming	Nominated	
1967	Academy Awards	Best Film Editing	In the Heat of the Night	Won	
1978	Academy Awards	Best Director	Coming Home	Nominated	
1976	Golden Globe Awards	Best Director	Bound for Glory	Nominated	
1978	Golden Globe Awards	Best Director	Coming Home	Nominated	
1979	Golden Globe Awards	Best Director	Being There	Nominated	
1973	Cannes Film Festival	Palme d'Or	The Last Detail	Nominated	
1976	Cannes Film Festival	Palme d'Or	Bound for Glory	Nominated	
1978	Cannes Film Festival	Palme d'Or	Coming Home	Nominated	
1979	Cannes Film Festival	Palme d'Or	Being There	Nominated	

Accolades received by films directed by Ashby

Year	Title	Academy Awards		BAFTA Awards		Golden Globe Awards	
Year	Title	Nominations	Wins	Nominations	Wins	Nominations	Wins
1970	The Landlord	1		1		1	
1971	Harold and Maude			1		2	
1973	The Last Detail	3		4	2	2	
1975	Shampoo	4	1	1		5	
1976	Bound for Glory	6	2			4	
1978	Coming Home	8	3			6	2
1979	Being There	2	1	4	1	6	2
Total		24	7	11	3	26	4

Directed Academy Award Performances

Year	Performer	Film	Result
Academy Award for Best Actor
1974	Jack Nicholson	The Last Detail	Nominated
1979	Jon Voight	Coming Home	Won
1980	Peter Sellers	Being There	Nominated
Academy Award for Best Supporting Actor
1974	Randy Quaid	The Last Detail	Nominated
1976	Jack Warden	Shampoo	Nominated
1979	Bruce Dern	Coming Home	Nominated
1980	Melvyn Douglas	Being There	Won
Academy Award for Best Actress
1979	Jane Fonda	Coming Home	Won
Academy Award for Best Supporting Actress
1971	Lee Grant	The Landlord	Nominated
1976	Lee Grant	Shampoo	Won
1979	Penelope Milford	Coming Home	Nominated

== See also ==
- Hal Ashby's unrealized projects

== Bibliography ==
- Dawson, Nick (2009). Being Hal Ashby: Life of a Hollywood Rebel. Lexington, Kentucky: University Press of Kentucky. ISBN 9780813173344.
