= 51st Academy Awards =

- Official poster
- Date: April 9, 1979
- Site: Dorothy Chandler Pavilion; Los Angeles, California, U.S.
- Hosted by: Johnny Carson
- Produced by: Jack Haley Jr.
- Directed by: Marty Pasetta

Highlights
- Best Picture: The Deer Hunter
- Most awards: The Deer Hunter (5)
- Most nominations: The Deer Hunter and Heaven Can Wait (9)

TV in the United States
- Network: ABC
- Duration: 3 hours, 25 minutes
- Ratings: 46.3 million 34.6 (Nielsen ratings)

The 51st Academy Awards ceremony, organized by the Academy of Motion Picture Arts and Sciences (AMPAS), honored films released in 1978 and took place on April 9, 1979, at the Dorothy Chandler Pavilion in Los Angeles, beginning at 7:00 p.m. PST / 10:00 p.m. EST. During the ceremony, AMPAS presented Academy Awards (commonly referred to as Oscars) in 21 categories. The ceremony, televised in the United States by ABC, was produced by Jack Haley Jr. and directed by Marty Pasetta. Comedian and talk show host Johnny Carson hosted the show for the first time. Three days earlier, in a ceremony held at The Beverly Hilton in Beverly Hills, California, the Academy Awards for Technical Achievement were presented by hosts Gregory Peck and Christopher Reeve.

The Deer Hunter won five awards at the main awards ceremony, including Best Picture. Other winners included Coming Home with three awards, Midnight Express with two, and The Buddy Holly Story, California Suite, Days of Heaven, Death on the Nile, The Flight of the Gossamer Condor, Get Out Your Handkerchiefs, Heaven Can Wait, Scared Straight!, Special Delivery, Superman, Teenage Father, and Thank God It's Friday with one. The telecast was watched by 46.3 million viewers and earned a 34.6 Nielsen rating in the United States.

== Ceremony ==
The ceremony, held at the Dorothy Chandler Pavilion in Downtown Los Angeles, was hosted by late-night talk host Johnny Carson for the first time. Jack Elliott and Allyn Ferguson served as musical directors for the telecast. Singers Sammy Davis Jr. and Steve Lawrence performed a medley called "Oscar's Only Human," which was composed of movie songs that were not nominated for Best Original Song. Initially, the academy's music branch protested the segment and urged that it be dropped from the ceremony, but it was kept after Haley threatened to leave his position as producer and pull Carson from emcee duties.

It is also remembered for being the final public appearance of Oscar-winning actor John Wayne, where he was given a standing ovation before presenting the award for Best Picture. On June 11, two months after the ceremony, he died from complications from stomach cancer at age 72. This was also the final public appearance for Jack Haley, the father of producer Jack Haley Jr., who presented the Best Costume Design with his Wizard of Oz co-star Ray Bolger.

== Winners and nominees ==
The nominees for the 51st Academy Awards were announced on February 20, 1979, by Academy president Howard W. Koch and actress Susan Blakely. The Deer Hunter and Heaven Can Wait tied for the most nominations with nine each. The winners were announced during the awards ceremony on April 9. Best Director nominees Warren Beatty and Buck Henry became the second pair of directors nominated in that category for the same film; Jerome Robbins and Robert Wise had won for co-directing 1961's West Side Story. Furthermore, Beatty was the first person to earn acting, directing, producing, and screenwriting nominations for the same film. While Orson Welles had previously achieved the same feat for Citizen Kane, rules at the time determined that the studio releasing the film, as opposed to the individual producers, were the official nominees for Best Picture. With Jon Voight and Jane Fonda's respective wins in the Best Actor and Best Actress categories, Coming Home was the fourth film to win both lead acting awards. Best Supporting Actress winner Maggie Smith became the only person to win an Oscar for playing an Oscar loser in California Suite.

=== Awards ===
Michael Cimino, Best Picture co-winner and Best Director winner

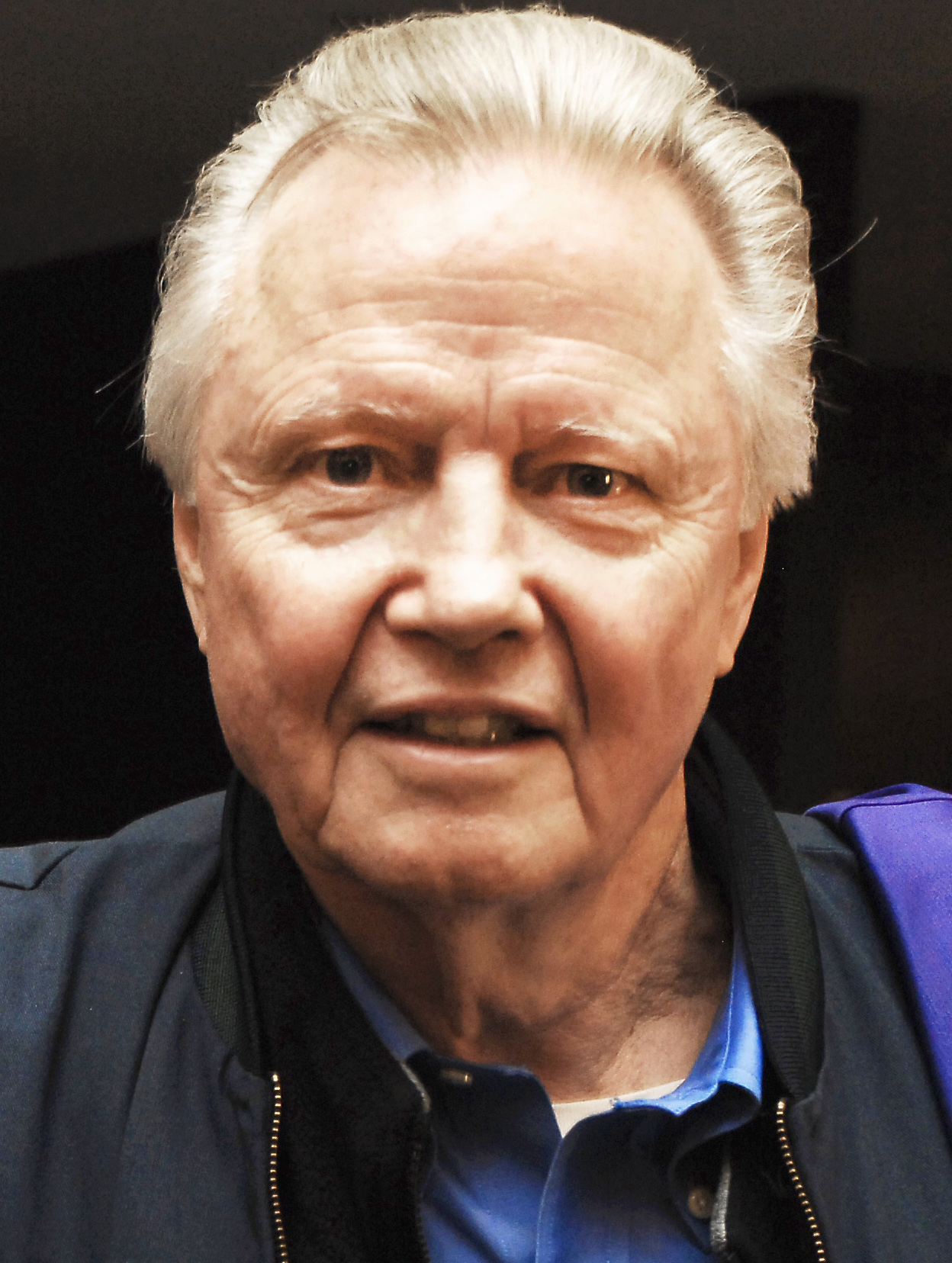
Jon Voight, Best Actor winner

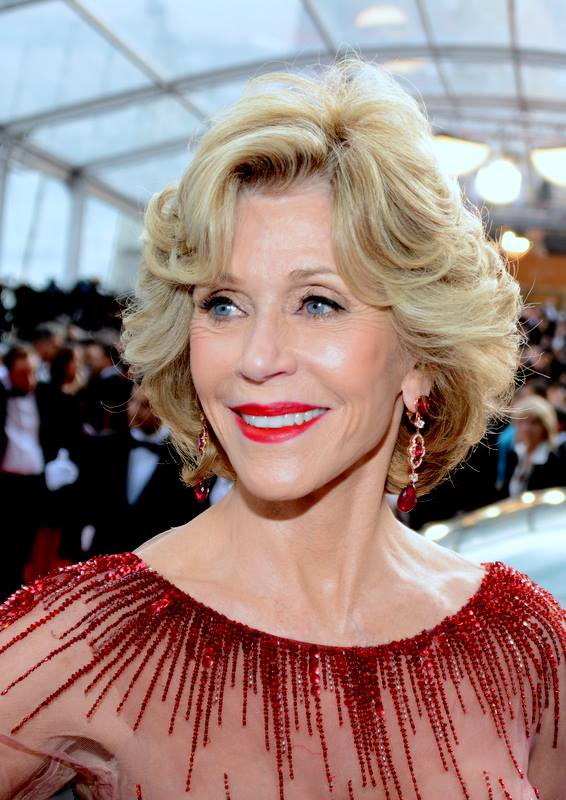
Jane Fonda, Best Actress winner

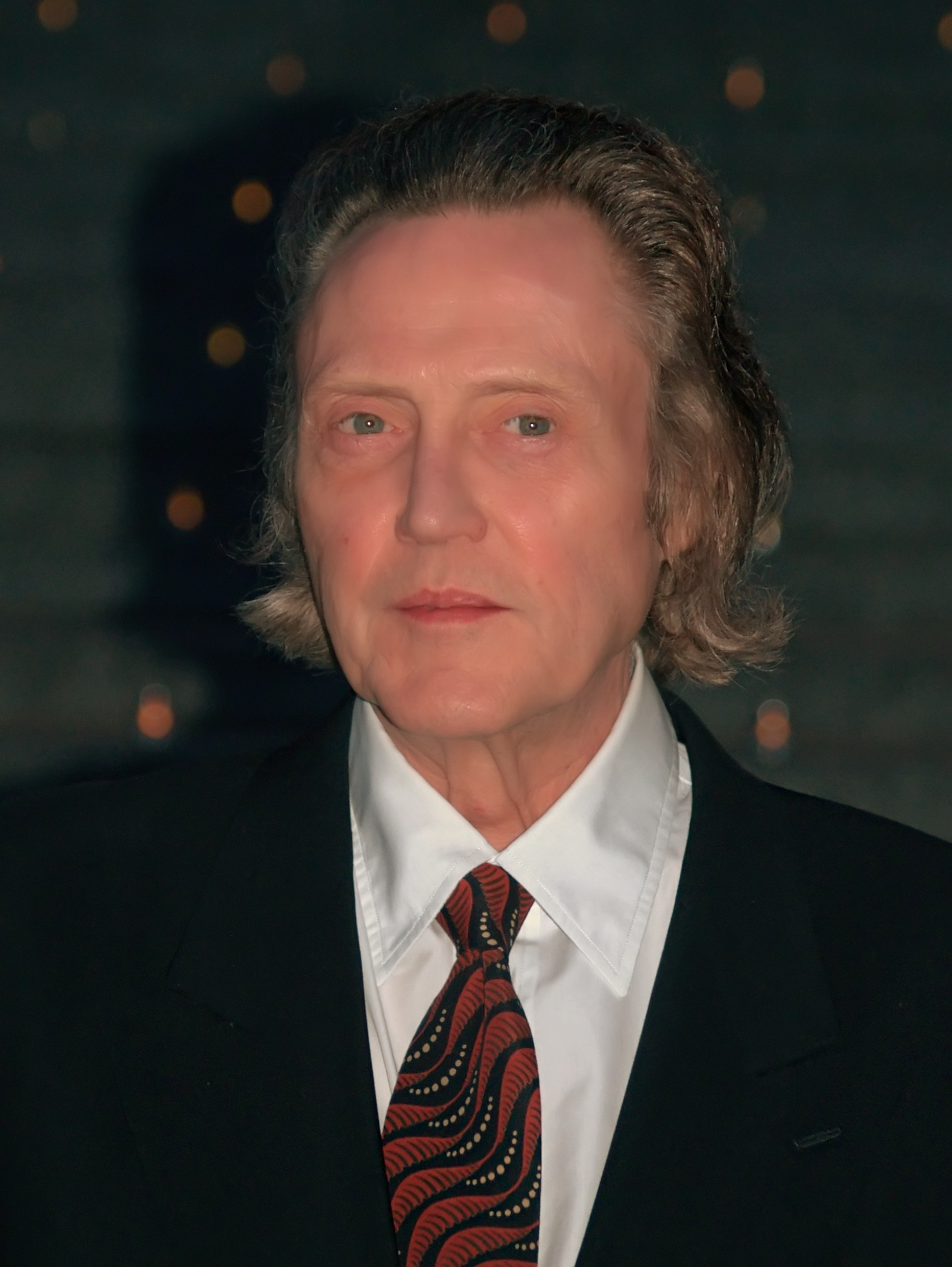
Christopher Walken, Best Supporting Actor winner

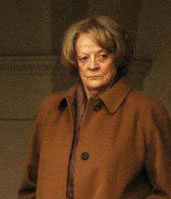
Maggie Smith, Best Supporting Actress winner

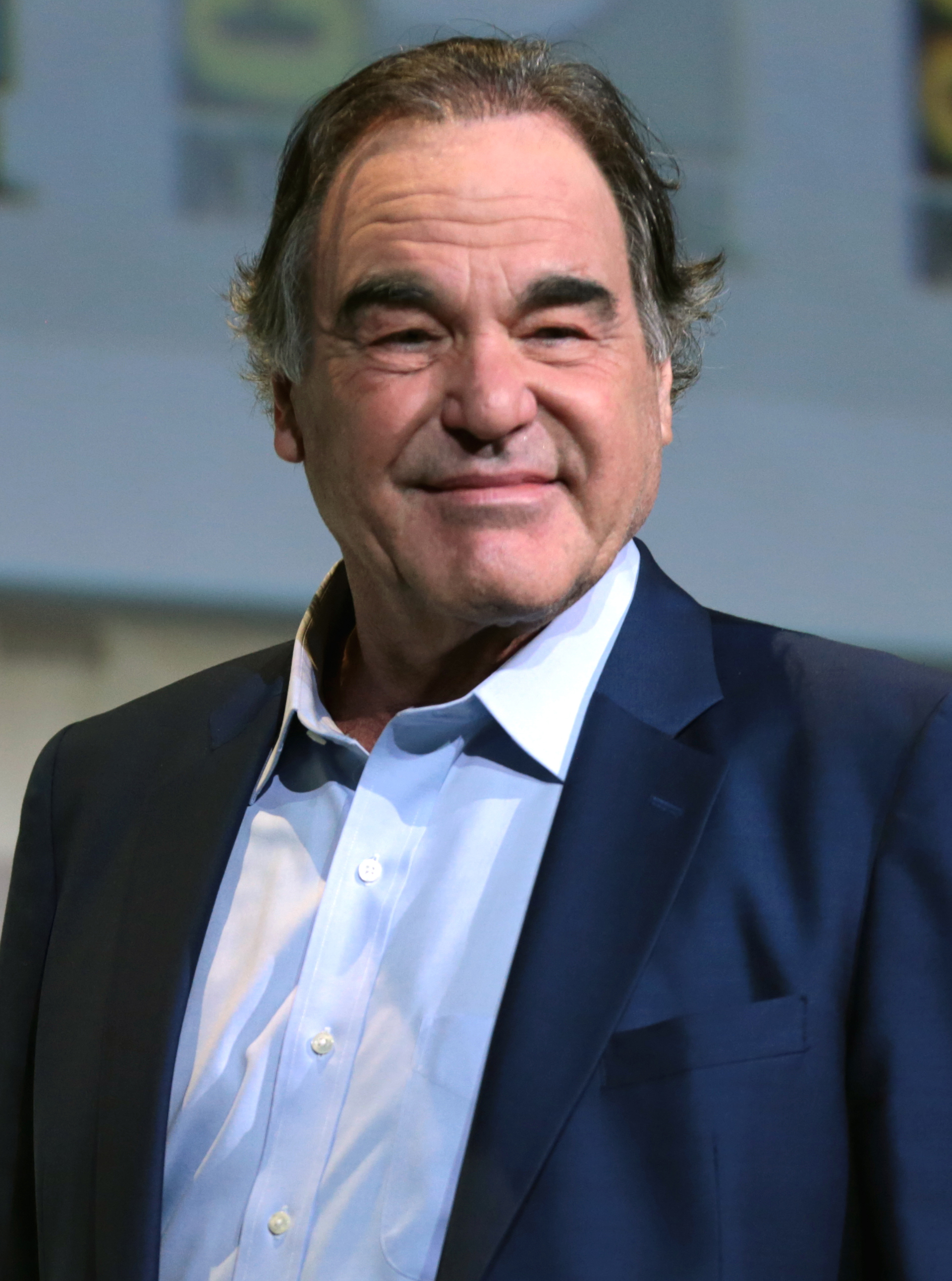
Oliver Stone, Best Adapted Screenplay winner

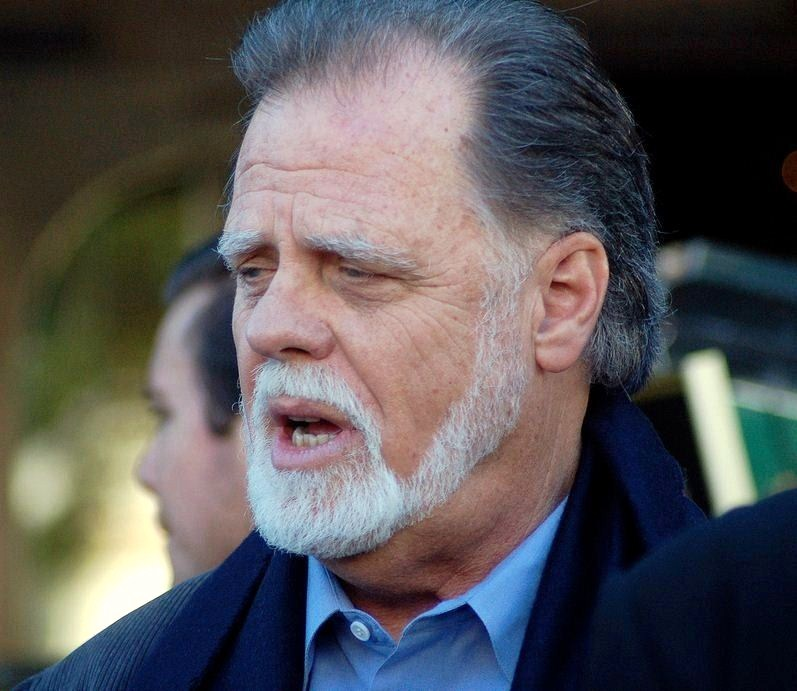
Taylor Hackford, Best Live Action Short Film winner

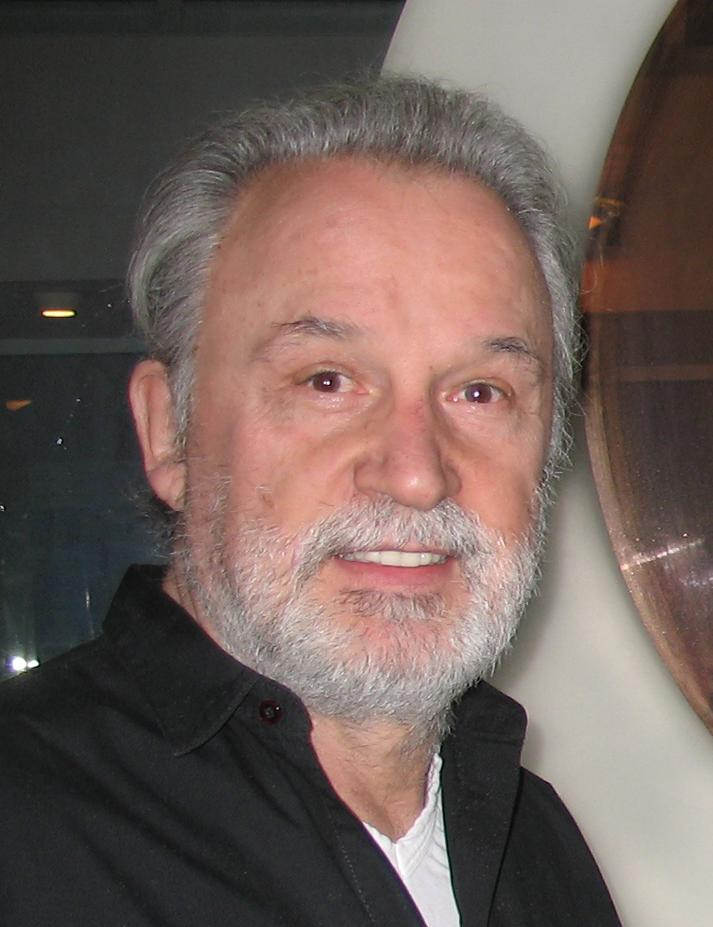
Giorgio Moroder, Best Original Score winner

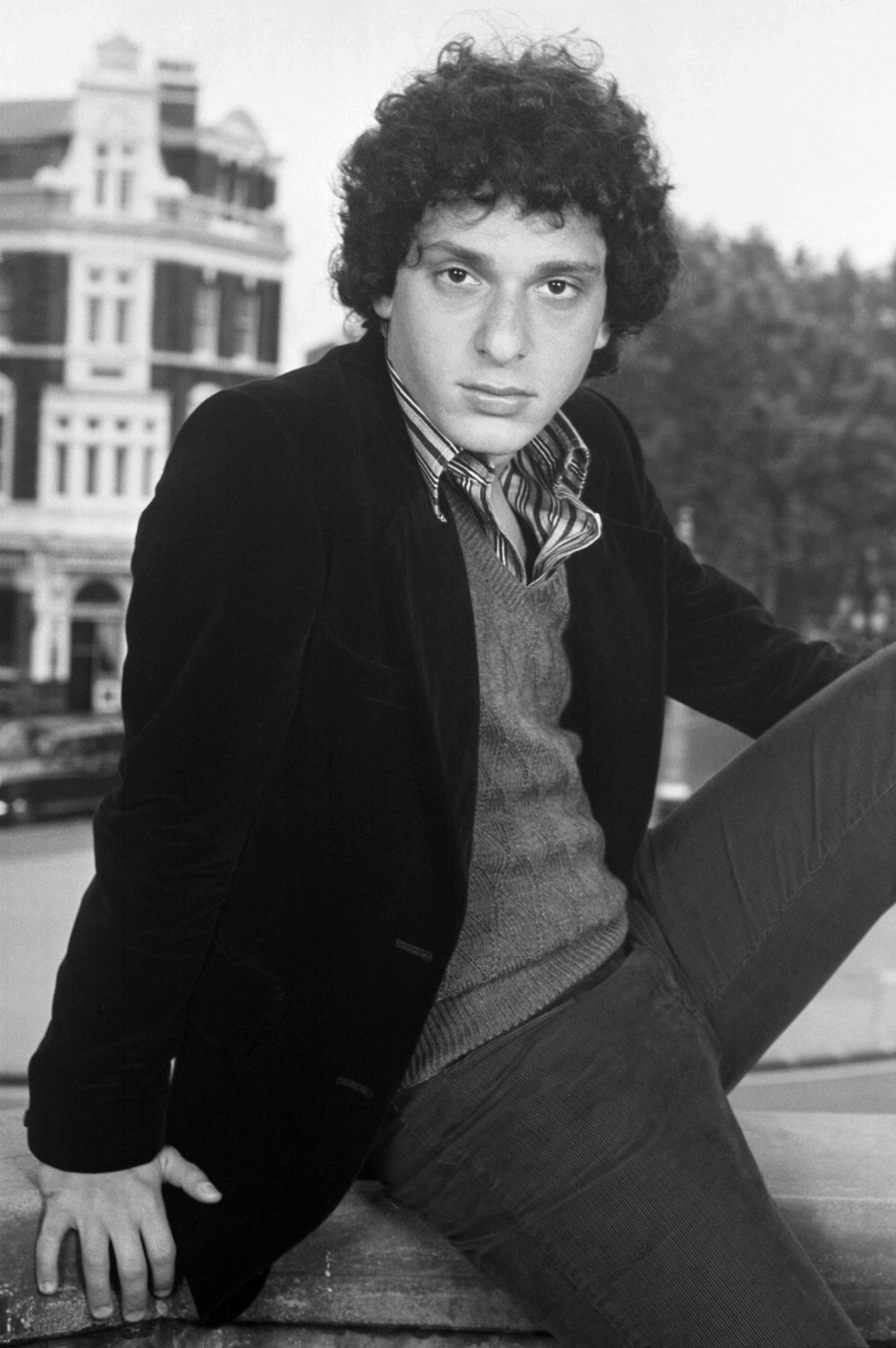
Paul Jabara, Best Original Song winner

Winners are listed first, highlighted in boldface and indicated with a double dagger (‡).

**Best Picture**: **The Deer Hunter – Barry Spikings, Michael Deeley, Michael Cimino and John Peverall, producers**‡; Coming Home – Jerome Hellman, producer; Heaven Can Wait – Warren Beatty, producer; Midnight Express – Alan Marshall and David Puttnam, producers; An Unmarried Woman – Paul Mazursky and Anthony Ray, producers	**Best Directing**: **Michael Cimino – The Deer Hunter**‡; Hal Ashby – Coming Home; Warren Beatty and Buck Henry – Heaven Can Wait; Woody Allen – Interiors; Alan Parker – Midnight Express
**Best Actor in a Leading Role**: **Jon Voight – Coming Home as Luke Martin**‡; Warren Beatty – Heaven Can Wait as Joe Pendleton/Leo Farnsworth/Tom Jarrett; Gary Busey – The Buddy Holly Story as Buddy Holly; Robert De Niro – The Deer Hunter as Sergeant Michael "Mike" Vronsky; Laurence Olivier – The Boys from Brazil as Ezra Lieberman	**Best Actress in a Leading Role**: **Jane Fonda – Coming Home as Sally Hyde**‡; Ingrid Bergman – Autumn Sonata as Charlotte Andergast; Ellen Burstyn – Same Time, Next Year as Doris; Jill Clayburgh – An Unmarried Woman as Erica Benton; Geraldine Page – Interiors as Eve
**Best Actor in a Supporting Role**: **Christopher Walken – The Deer Hunter as Corporal Nikanor "Nick" Chevotarevich**‡; Bruce Dern – Coming Home as Captain Bob Hyde; Richard Farnsworth – Comes a Horseman as Dodger; John Hurt – Midnight Express as Max; Jack Warden – Heaven Can Wait as Max Corkle	**Best Actress in a Supporting Role**: **Maggie Smith – California Suite as Diana Barrie**‡; Dyan Cannon – Heaven Can Wait as Julia Farnsworth; Penelope Milford – Coming Home as Vi Munson; Maureen Stapleton – Interiors as Pearl; Meryl Streep – The Deer Hunter as Linda
**Best Writing (Screenplay Written Directly for the Screen)**: **Coming Home – Story by Nancy Dowd; Screenplay by Waldo Salt and Robert C. Jones**‡; Autumn Sonata – Ingmar Bergman; The Deer Hunter – Story by Michael Cimino, Deric Washburn, Louis A. Garfinkle and Quinn Redeker; Screenplay by Deric Washburn; Interiors – Woody Allen; An Unmarried Woman – Paul Mazursky	**Best Writing (Screenplay Based on Material from Another Medium)**: **Midnight Express – Oliver Stone based on the book by Billy Hayes and William Hoffer**‡; Bloodbrothers – Walter Newman based on the novel by Richard Price; California Suite – Neil Simon based on his play; Heaven Can Wait – Elaine May and Warren Beatty based on the play by Harry Segall; Same Time, Next Year – Bernard Slade based on his play
**Best Foreign Language Film**: **Get Out Your Handkerchiefs (France) in French – Directed by Bertrand Blier**‡; The Glass Cell (West Germany) in German – Directed by Hans W. Geißendörfer; Hungarians (Hungary) in Hungarian – Directed by Zoltán Fábri; Viva Italia! (Italy) in Italian – Directed by Dino Risi, Ettore Scola, and Mario Monicelli; White Bim Black Ear (Soviet Union) in Russian – Directed by Stanislav Rostotsky	**Best Documentary (Feature)**: **Scared Straight! – Arnold Shapiro**‡; The Lovers' Wind (Le vent des amoureux) – Albert Lamorisse (posthumous nomination); Mysterious Castles of Clay – Alan Root; Raoni – Jean-Pierre Dutilleux, Barry Hugh Williams and Michel Gast; With Babies and Banners: Story of the Women's Emergency Brigade – Anne Bohlen, Lyn Goldfarb and Lorraine Gray
**Best Documentary (Short Subject)**: **The Flight of the Gossamer Condor – Jacqueline Phillips Shedd and Ben Shedd**‡; The Divided Trail: A Native American Odyssey – Jerry Aronson; An Encounter with Faces – K. K. Kapil; Goodnight Miss Ann – August Cinquegrana; Squires of San Quentin – J. Gary Mitchell	**Best Short Film (Live Action)**: **Teenage Father – Taylor Hackford**‡; A Different Approach – Jim Belcher and Fern Field; Mandy's Grandmother – Andrew Sugerman; Strange Fruit – Seth Pinsker
**Best Short Film (Animated)**: **Special Delivery – Eunice Macaulay and John Weldon**‡; Oh My Darling – Nico Crama; Rip Van Winkle – Will Vinton	**Best Music (Original Score)**: **Midnight Express – Giorgio Moroder**‡; The Boys from Brazil – Jerry Goldsmith; Days of Heaven – Ennio Morricone; Heaven Can Wait – Dave Grusin; Superman – John Williams
**Best Music (Adaptation Score)**: **The Buddy Holly Story – Joe Renzetti**‡; Pretty Baby – Jerry Wexler; The Wiz – Quincy Jones	**Best Music (Original Song)**: **"Last Dance" from Thank God It's Friday – Music and lyrics by Paul Jabara**‡; "Hopelessly Devoted to You" from Grease – Music and lyrics by John Farrar; "The Last Time I Felt Like This" from Same Time, Next Year – Music by Marvin Hamlisch; lyrics by Alan and Marilyn Bergman; "Ready to Take a Chance Again" from Foul Play – Music by Charles Fox; lyrics by Norman Gimbel; "When You're Loved" from The Magic of Lassie – Music and lyrics by Richard M. Sherman and Robert B. Sherman
**Best Sound**: **The Deer Hunter – Richard Portman, William McCaughey, Aaron Rochin and Darin Knight**‡; The Buddy Holly Story – Tex Rudloff, Joel Fein, Curly Thirlwell and Willie D. Burton; Days of Heaven – John Wilkinson, Robert W. Glass Jr., John T. Reitz and Barry Thomas; Hooper – Robert Knudson, Robert Glass, Don MacDougall and Jack Solomon; Superman – Gordon McCallum, Graham V. Hartstone, Nicolas Le Messurier and Roy Charman	**Best Art Direction**: **Heaven Can Wait – Art Direction: Paul Sylbert and Edwin O'Donovan; Set Decoration: George Gaines**‡; The Brink's Job – Art Direction: Dean Tavoularis and Angelo P. Graham; Set Decoration: George R. Nelson and Bruce Kay; California Suite – Art Direction: Albert Brenner; Set Decoration: Marvin March; Interiors – Art Direction: Mel Bourne; Set Decoration: Daniel Robert; The Wiz – Art Direction: Tony Walton and Philip Rosenberg; Set Decoration: Edward Stewart and Robert Drumheller
**Best Cinematography**: **Days of Heaven – Néstor Almendros**‡; The Deer Hunter – Vilmos Zsigmond; Heaven Can Wait – William A. Fraker; Same Time, Next Year – Robert Surtees; The Wiz – Oswald Morris	**Best Costume Design**: **Death on the Nile – Anthony Powell**‡; Caravans – Renié; Days of Heaven – Patricia Norris; The Swarm – Paul Zastupnevich; The Wiz – Tony Walton
**Best Film Editing**: **The Deer Hunter – Peter Zinner**‡; The Boys from Brazil – Robert E. Swink; Coming Home – Don Zimmerman; Midnight Express – Gerry Hambling; Superman – Stuart Baird

=== Special Achievement Award (Visual Effects) ===
- Superman – Les Bowie, Colin Chilvers, Denys Coop, Roy Field, Derek Meddings and Zoran Perisic.

=== Honorary Awards ===
- To Walter Lantz for bringing joy and laughter to every part of the world through his unique animated motion pictures.
- To The Museum of Modern Art Department of Film for the contribution it has made to the public's perception of movies as an art form.
- To Laurence Olivier for the full body of his work, for the unique achievements of his entire career and his lifetime of contribution to the art of film.
- To King Vidor for his incomparable achievements as a cinematic creator and innovator.

=== Jean Hersholt Humanitarian Award ===
The award recognizes individuals whose humanitarian efforts have brought credit to the motion picture industry.

- Leo Jaffe

=== Multiple nominations and awards ===
The following fourteen films had multiple nominations:

Nominations	Film
9	The Deer Hunter
9	Heaven Can Wait
8	Coming Home
6	Midnight Express
5	Interiors
4	Days of Heaven
4	Same Time, Next Year
4	The Wiz
3	The Boys from Brazil
3	The Buddy Holly Story
3	California Suite
3	Superman (Note: Not counting the non-competitive Special Achievement Award for Superman.)
3	An Unmarried Woman
2	Autumn Sonata

The following three films received multiple awards.

Awards	Film
5	The Deer Hunter
3	Coming Home
2	Midnight Express

== Presenters and performers ==
The following individuals, listed in order of appearance, presented awards or performed musical numbers:

=== Presenters ===
Name(s)	Role
John Harlan	Announcer for the 51st Academy Awards
Howard W. Koch (AMPAS President)	Gave opening remarks welcoming guests to the awards ceremony
Robin Williams Woody Woodpecker	Presenters of the Honorary Award to Walter Lantz
Danny Thomas	Explained the voting rules to the public
Dyan Cannon Telly Savalas	Presenters of the award for Best Supporting Actor
Maggie Smith Maureen Stapleton	Presenters of the Scientific and Technical Awards
Robby Benson Carol Lynley	Presenters of the Short Subject Awards
Mia Farrow David L. Wolper	Presenters of the Documentary Awards
Shirley Jones Ricky Schroder	Presenters of the award for Best Art Direction
Ray Bolger Jack Haley	Presenters of the award for Best Costume Design
Dom DeLuise Valerie Perrine	Presenters of the award for Best Film Editing
Steve Martin	Presenter of the award for Best Visual Effects
Margot Kidder Christopher Reeve	Presenters of the award for Best Sound
James Coburn Kim Novak	Presenters of the award for Best Cinematography
Ruby Keeler Kris Kristofferson	Presenters of the award for Best Original Song
Paul Williams	Introducer to Sammy Davis Jr. and Steve Lawrence performance
Dean Martin Raquel Welch	Presenters of the Music Awards
Gregory Peck	Presenter of the Honorary Award to the Museum of Modern Art Department of Film
Yul Brynner Natalie Wood	Presenters of the award for Best Foreign Language Film
George Burns Brooke Shields	Presenters of the award for Best Supporting Actress
Lauren Bacall Jon Voight	Presenters of the Writing Awards
Audrey Hepburn	Presenter of the Honorary Award to King Vidor
Francis Ford Coppola Ali MacGraw	Presenters of the award for Best Director
Cary Grant	Presenter of the Honorary Award to Laurence Olivier
Richard Dreyfuss Shirley MacLaine	Presenters of the award for Best Actress
Jack Valenti	Presenter of the Jean Hersholt Humanitarian Award
Ginger Rogers Diana Ross	Presenters of the award for Best Actor
John Wayne	Presenter of the award for Best Picture

=== Performers ===
Name	Role	Performed
Jack Elliot	Musical arrangers	Orchestral
Allyn Ferguson	Musical arrangers	Orchestral
Olivia Newton-John	Performer	"Hopelessly Devoted to You" from Grease
Jane Olivor	Performers	"The Last Time I Felt Like This" from Same Time, Next Year
Johnny Mathis	Performers	"The Last Time I Felt Like This" from Same Time, Next Year
Donna Summer	Performer	"Last Dance" from Thank God It's Friday
Debby Boone	Performer	"When You're Loved" from The Magic of Lassie
Barry Manilow	Performer	"Ready to Take a Chance Again" from Foul Play
Sammy Davis Jr.	Performers	"Not Even Nominated (Oscar's Only Human)"
Steve Lawrence	Performers	"Not Even Nominated (Oscar's Only Human)"
Academy Awards Orchestra	Performers	"That's Entertainment!" (instrumental)

== See also ==
- List of submissions to the 51st Academy Awards for Best Foreign Language Film

== Bibliography ==
- Franks, Don (2005), Entertainment Awards: A Music, Cinema, Theatre and Broadcasting Guide, 1928 through 2003 (3rd ed.), Jefferson, North Carolina, United States: McFarland & Company, ISBN 978-1-5791-2396-3
- Kinn, Gail; Piazza, Jim (2002), The Academy Awards: The Complete Unofficial History, New York, New York, United States: Workman Publishing Company, ISBN 978-1-5791-2396-3
- Osborne, Robert (2013). 85 Years of the Oscar: The Complete History of the Academy Awards. New York, New York, United States: Abbeville Publishing Group. ISBN 978-0-7892-1142-2.
- Pond, Steve (2005), The Big Show: High Times and Dirty Dealings Backstage at the Academy Awards, New York, New York, United States: Faber and Faber, ISBN 978-0-5712-1193-7
- Wiley, Mason; Bona, Damien (1996), Inside Oscar: The Unofficial History of the Academy Awards (5 ed.), New York, New York, United States: Ballantine Books, ISBN 978-0-3454-0053-6, OCLC 779680732
