= İmralı prison =

Prison on İmralı, Turkey

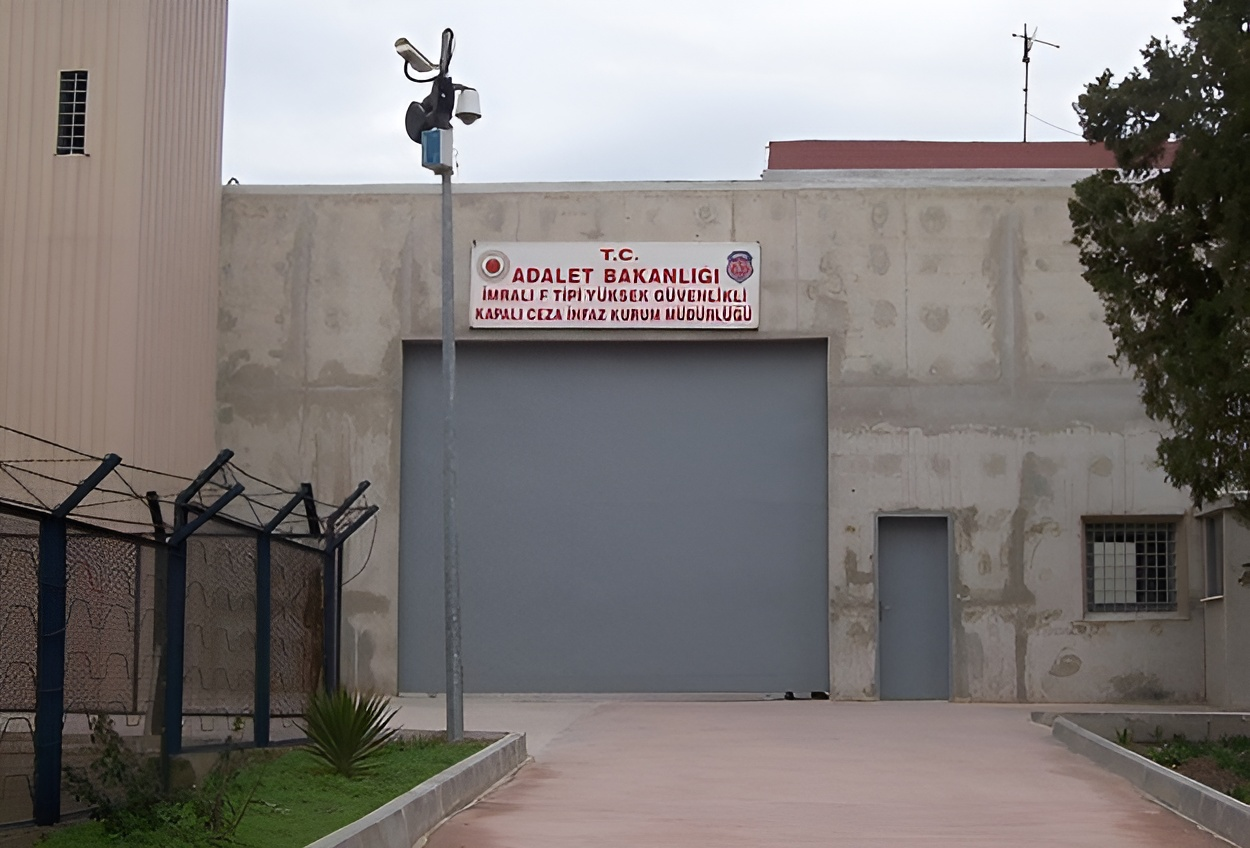
- Entrance of İmralı prison

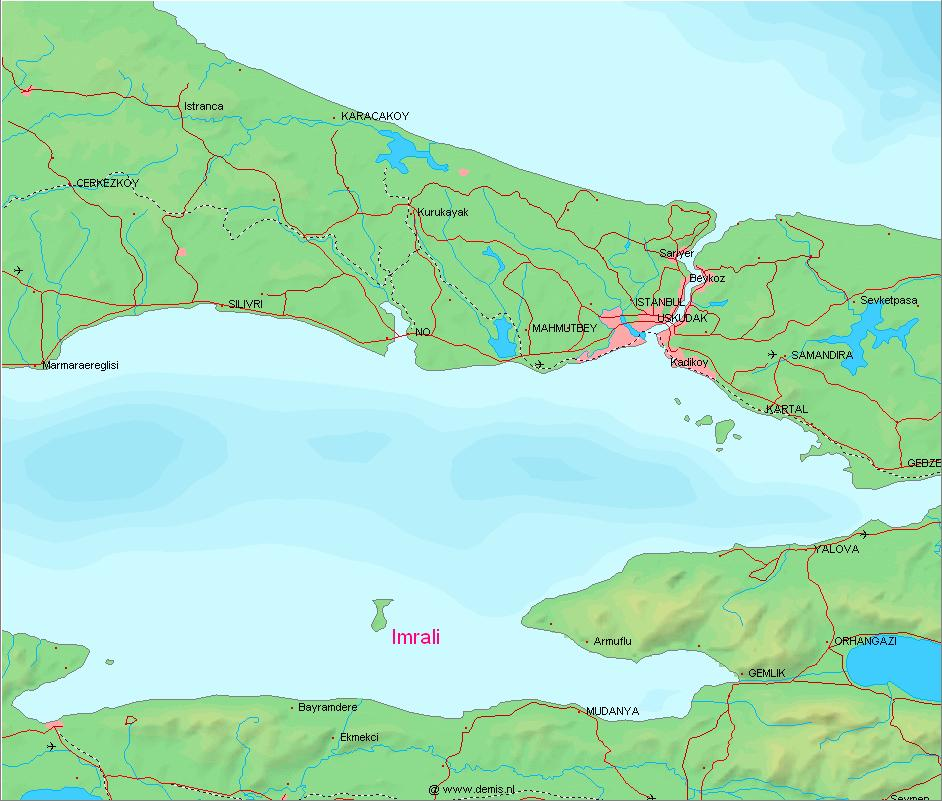
- Interactive map of İmralı prison
- Location: Bursa Province, Turkey; 40°33′21″N 28°32′35″E
- Opened: 1935

İmralı prison is a high-security prison on the island of İmralı in the Sea of Marmara in Turkey. It holds prisoners from the Kurdistan Workers' Party (PKK) and one prisoner of the Communist Party of Turkey/Marxist–Leninist (TKP/ML). The prison facility is guarded by the military and is also monitored over satellite imagery from space. The prison was the scene of several memorable moments in Turkish history.

== Location ==
The prison is located on İmralı island in the Sea of Marmara, south of Istanbul. The island is accessible by boat from Mudanya at the southern coast of the Sea of Marmara.

== History ==
The idea to create an agricultural colony on the island existed since 1933. By July 1935 the creation of semi-open prison facility was discussed in the Cumhuriyet. In January 1936 the first fifty inmates tasked to construct the dorms for the prison facility set foot on the island. Later they were deployed to fishing and engage in agriculture. The following years, the population of the prison facility increased significantly and reached four hundred in 1937 and nine hundred in 1941. Until 1947, close to five-thousand have become inmates of the prison facility at some point of which 443 were sent to other prisons due to disciplinary measures. The prison became known as a model prison and inspired the creation of other prisons in which prisoners were employed to work in agriculture and mines. Until 1953 several Ministers of Justice visited the island and hundreds of law students visited the island to conduct research.

Following the Turkish military coup in 1960, ex-Prime Minister Adnan Menderes was imprisoned on the island. After the death sentences delivered at the Yassıada trials, on Yassiada island, the ex-Foreign Minister Fatin Rüştü Zorlu and ex-Finance Minister Hasan Polatkan were both hanged on the 15 September 1961 while Menderes was hanged two days later. After February 1999, the leader of the Kurdistan Workers Party (PKK) Abdullah Öcalan was captured, the island was vacated and placed within a military zone. In November 2009, a new detention facility was inaugurated, to which Öcalan and five other prisoners coming from mainland Turkey were transferred.

== Detention conditions ==
Until 1999, the prison's inmates produced soap and some were employed as shepherds of animals. After the capture of Abdullah Öcalan in February 1999, the animals as well as the prison population were transferred to mainland Turkey to make space for the security personnel and Öcalan. Between 1999 and 2009, he was the only inmate. In November 2009, he was joined by five other prisoners. Since 1999 the detention conditions have been reviewed several times by the Committee for the Prevention of Torture (CPT). The prisoners have access to health facilities on the island and can interact with each other for six hours per week.

== Prison breaks ==
Between 1937 and 1945 there were reportedly nineteen attempts to escape the island prison. Sixteen escapees were eventually captured while three died.

Billy Hayes, who was imprisoned for smuggling hashish from Turkey, escaped from the island in 1975.

Yilmaz Güney escaped from the prison in 1981 by fleeing the country while on furlough.

In 1997, several Chechens who were imprisoned on the island were also able to escape.

== In popular culture ==
Inspired by the well detention conditions the inmates experienced in 1940s, the Turkish playwright Vedat Nedim Tör wrote the play Men in Imrali.

Billy Hayes's stay in and escape from prison on İmralı are portrayed in the film Midnight Express by Alan Parker, which is based on Hayes's book of the same name.

In the film Yol by Yilmaz Güney, originally a government supported production designed to counteract the negative image of Turkish prisons portrayed in Midnight Express, inmates are seen preparing to visit their homes.

== Notable inmates ==
- Adnan Menderes, Prime Minister of Turkey
- Celâl Bayar, Turkish president
- Yılmaz Güney, Kurdish film director
- Billy Hayes, author of Midnight Express
