= 1979 Academy Awards =

1979 Academy Awards may refer to:

- 51st Academy Awards, the Academy Awards ceremony that took place in 1979
- 52nd Academy Awards, the 1980 ceremony honoring the best in film for 1979
