= Midnight Express (film) =

1978 prison drama film directed by Alan Parker

- Theatrical release poster
- Directed by: Alan Parker
- Screenplay by: Oliver Stone
- Based on: the book by William Hayes with William Hoffer
- Produced by: Alan Marshall; David Puttnam
- Starring: Brad Davis
- Cinematography: Michael Seresin (lighting cameraman)
- Edited by: Gerry Hambling
- Music by: Giorgio Moroder
- Production company: Casablanca FilmWorks
- Distributed by: Columbia Pictures
- Release dates: 18 May 1978 (Cannes); 10 August 1978 (U.K.); 6 October 1978 (U.S.)
- Running time: 121 minutes
- Countries: United Kingdom; United States
- Languages: English; Turkish; Maltese
- Budget: $2.3 million
- Box office: $35 million

Midnight Express is a 1978 prison drama film directed by Alan Parker with a screenplay by Oliver Stone. It is based on Billy Hayes's 1977 memoir of the same name (co-authored with William Hoffer), which recounts his imprisonment in Turkey for drug smuggling. The film's title is prison slang for an escape attempt. The cast includes Brad Davis as Hayes, with Irene Miracle, Bo Hopkins, Paul L. Smith, Randy Quaid, and John Hurt in supporting roles.

Midnight Express received generally positive reviews from critics. The film was nominated for Best Picture and Best Director for Parker at the 51st Academy Awards in 1979, and won Best Adapted Screenplay for Stone and Best Original Score for Giorgio Moroder. It also won six Golden Globes, including Best Motion Picture – Drama and BAFTA Awards for Best Direction, Best Editing and Best Actor in a Supporting Role (for John Hurt).

The film faced criticism for its overwhelmingly negative portrayal of Turks and for deviating too much from Hayes' account in order to add shock value.

== Plot ==
Returning from a trip to Istanbul with his girlfriend, American college student Billy Hayes straps 2 kg (4.4 lb) of hashish bricks to his chest with the intent to smuggle the drug into the United States where he will sell it.

At the Yeşilköy Airport, Billy is frisked by soldiers who discover the hidden hashish, leading to his arrest and strip-search. An American operative nicknamed "Tex" arrives to translate and assist police. Billy claims he purchased the drugs from a taxi driver and offers to identify the driver in exchange for his own release. He is taken to a local market where Billy points out the driver. As police approach, Billy attempts to flee but encounters Tex, who recaptures him at gunpoint.

During his first night at Sultanahmet Jail, Billy sneaks out of his cell to steal a blanket and is subsequently beaten by chief guard Hamidou. He awakens days later at Sağmalcılar Prison among fellow Western inmates: Jimmy, an American thief; Max, an English heroin addict; and Erich, a Swedish smuggler. Jimmy warns Billy that foreigners face extreme danger in the prison and that no one can be trusted.

Billy is visited by his father and a Turkish attorney to discuss his defense. At the trial, the prosecutor argues for a smuggling conviction, but a sympathetic lead judge sentences Billy to four years for the lesser crime of possession. Though Billy and his father are dismayed, their lawyer reassures them that the outcome is favorable given the prosecutor's push for a smuggling conviction, which carries a life sentence.

Jimmy invites Billy to join a tunnel escape attempt, but Billy declines as his release approaches. Jimmy attempts the escape alone and is caught and beaten by guards. Fifty-three days before Billy's scheduled release, the Turkish High Court upholds a prosecution appeal which overturns his possession conviction. Billy is re-sentenced to 30 years for the more serious crime of smuggling.

Now desperate, Billy joins Jimmy and Max in their escape through the prison catacombs, but they hit dead ends. Informant Rifki exposes them, causing Jimmy's removal and disappearance. Following severe abuse, Billy suffers a breakdown and beats Rifki to death. He is transferred to an asylum ward where he finds Max severely injured after an altercation with Hamidou.

In 1975, Susan visits Billy in prison and passes him money hidden in a scrapbook, urging him to escape. The encounter restores his resolve, and he bids farewell to a dying Max. Billy then attempts to bribe Hamidou to transfer him to the hospital. In response, Hamidou tries to rape him. In the ensuing struggle, Billy kills Hamidou by impaling his head on a wall hook. Billy then dons a guard's uniform, bluffs his way past security, and steps out the main entrance to his freedom.

== Cast ==
(in order of appearance)

- Brad Davis as Billy Hayes
- Irene Miracle as Susan
- Bo Hopkins as Tex
- Paolo Bonacelli as Rifki
- Paul Smith as Hamidou
- Randy Quaid as Jimmy Booth
- Norbert Weisser as Erich
- John Hurt as Max
- Mike Kellin as Mr. Hayes
- Franco Diogene as Yesil
- Michael Ensign as Stanley Daniels
- Gigi Ballista as Chief Judge
- Kevork Malikyan as Prosecutor
- Peter Jeffrey as Ahmet
- Joe Zammit Cordina as airport customs officer
- Zanninos Zanninou as police detective
- Yashar Adem as airport police chief
- Michael Yannatos as court interpreter
- Raad Rawi as airport security chief
- Vic Tablian as Star
- Tony Boyd as Aslan
- Ahmed El Shenawi as Negdir

Alan Parker makes a cameo appearance as a long-haired man in airport.

== Production ==
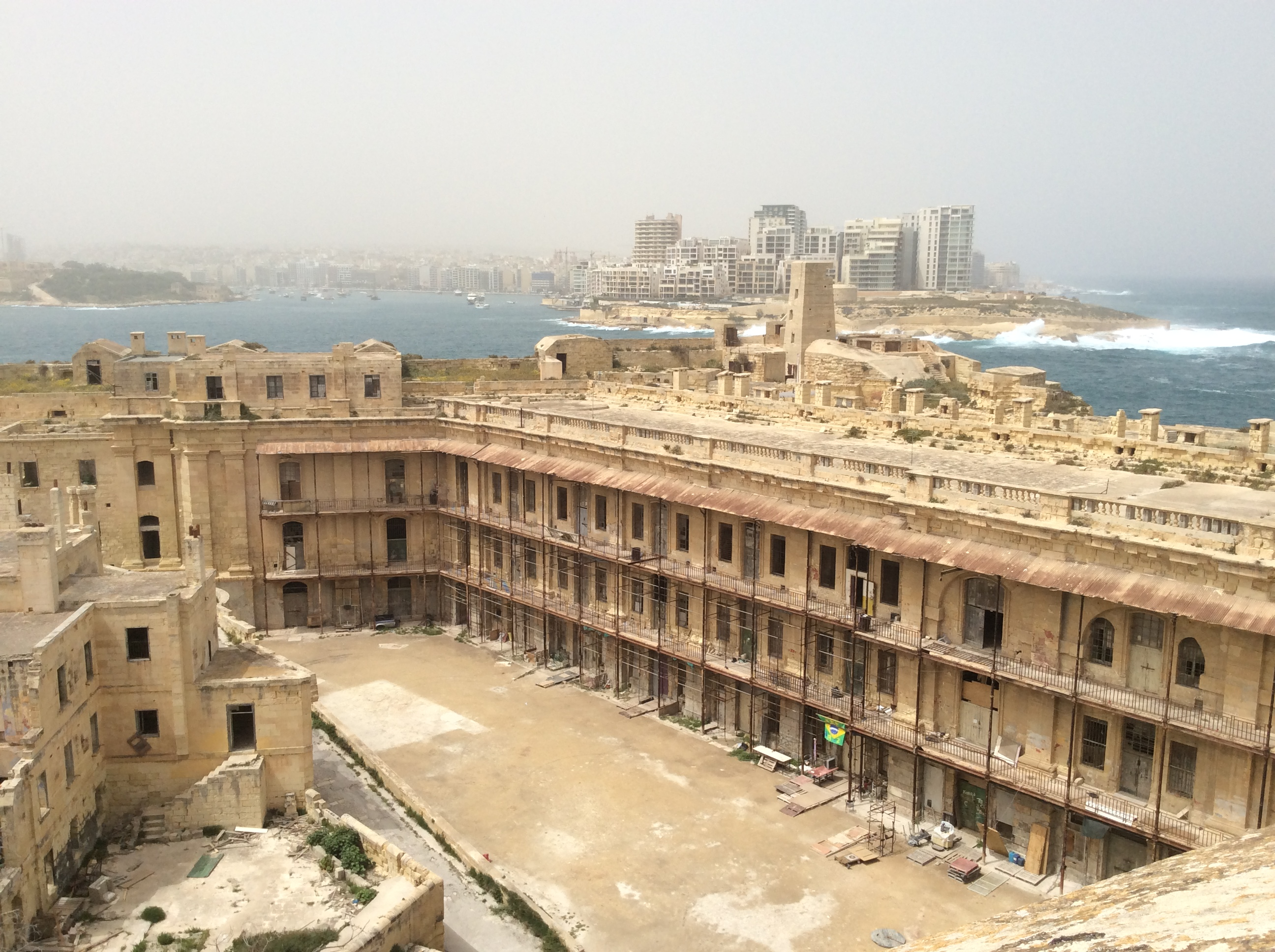
The film was mostly shot in the lower parts of Fort Saint Elmo in Valletta.

Production took place almost entirely at Fort Saint Elmo in the Maltese capital Valletta, after permission to film in Istanbul was denied. Background shots of Istanbul were taken by a small crew pretending to be making a cigarette commercial.

== Release ==
The film screened at the 1978 Cannes Film Festival. It opened at the Odeon Haymarket in London on Thursday, 10 August 1978 grossing $3,472 in its opening day, a Columbia Pictures record in the UK. It opened in New York on 6 October 1978 before opening nationwide in the United States on 27 October.

=== Censorship ===
In the Netherlands, the local distributors of the film, pressured by the Turkish community, cut selected subtitles in which Hayes is depicted as abusive toward Turkey and to the Turkish people in general; After a brief reinstatement of the subtitles, the country's Turkish community went to court to have them removed; a judge deemed the subtitles acceptable but said they could be removed at the discretion of the distributor, who then did so. In 1978, the Turkish government attempted to prevent the film from being screened in Israel. Variety reported that the attempt was successful. Israel's Theatre and Film Control Board denied that there was any official pressure on the decision, but Variety suspected Turkish influence behind the Board's decision.

In September 1978, the Turkish Ambassador to Ireland attempted to get the film banned in Ireland. Irish Censor Dermot Breen responded that the film was a "brilliant but shattering experience". The attempt was ultimately unsuccessful.

The Turkish government made a further unsuccessful attempt to ban the film in Federal Republic of Germany (West Germany); the German government said that it did not have the authority to ban films.

=== Home media ===
The film was first released on VHS and Betamax by Columbia Pictures Home Entertainment in 1979. It made its DVD debut in 1998. A 30th Anniversary DVD of the film was released in 2008, and a Blu-ray was released in 2009.

== Reception ==
According to the film review aggregator Rotten Tomatoes, 90% of critics gave the film positive reviews, based on 31 reviews with an average rating of 7.6/10. The website's critics consensus reads, "Raw and unrelenting, Midnight Express is riveting in its realistic depiction of incarceration -- mining pathos from the simple act of enduring hardship." On Metacritic, the film has a weighted average score of 59 out of 100, based on 11 critics, indicating "mixed or average reviews".

Roger Ebert gave Midnight Express three stars out of four in a review that concluded, "The movie creates spellbinding terror, all right; my only objection is that it's so eager to have us sympathize with Billy Hayes." Gene Siskel gave the film two and a half stars out of four and called it "a powerful film, but we leave the theater thinking it should have been more so. It was for that reason that I was persuaded to read the book, which is where I found the story I had been expecting to see on the screen." He also thought that Brad Davis "is simply not up to the lead role. He appears unsure of himself and, like the film itself, he overacts."

Arthur D. Murphy of Variety wrote, "Acceptance of the film depends a lot on forgetting several things," namely that Hayes was smuggling drugs. Nevertheless, he thought Davis gave "a strong performance" and that "Alan Parker's direction and other credits are also admirable, once you swallow the specious and hypocritical story."

Charles Champlin, of the Los Angeles Times, was positive, writing that the film "has a kind of wailing, arid authenticity and enormous power. It is strong and uncompromising stuff, made bearable by its artistry and the saving awareness that Hayes, at least, slipped free and lived to tell the tale." Gary Arnold, of The Washington Post, described the film as "outrageously sensationalistic" and "loaded with show-stopping fabrications," and wrote of the protagonist that "there's never a compelling reason for sympathizing with the callow boy he appears to be from start to finish."

=== Allegations of anti-Turkish sentiment ===
Midnight Express was also criticized for its highly negative portrayal of Turkish people. Shortly following the film's premiere at Cannes, the Turkish government attempted to ban the film in the country based on its "anti-Turk rhetoric". On 23 May 1978, the Turkish Ministry of Foreign Affairs released a statement condemning the film through its embassies around the world. Showings of the film were protested by the Turkish diaspora in the UK, France, Ireland, the Netherlands, Denmark, Sweden, Finland and West Germany, The Turkish press viewed it as insulting and a political "assault" on Turkey and the Turkish people upon its initial release in 1978, causing three theaters in France to stop showing it. A cinema in Australia had to be evacuated due to a bomb threat. In her 1991 book Turkish Reflections: A Biography of Place, Mary Lee Settle wrote: "The Turks I saw in Lawrence of Arabia and Midnight Express were like cartoon caricatures, compared to the people I had known and lived among for three of the happiest years of my life."

Pauline Kael, in reviewing the film for The New Yorker, commented, "This story could have happened in almost any country, but if Billy Hayes had planned to be arrested to get the maximum commercial benefit from it, where else could he get the advantages of a Turkish jail? Who wants to defend Turks? (They don't even constitute enough of a movie market for Columbia Pictures to be concerned about how they are represented.)" A reviewer in World Film Directors wrote, "Midnight Express is 'more violent, as a national hate-film than anything I can remember', 'a cultural form that narrows horizons, confirming the audience's meanest fears and prejudices and resentments'."

David Denby of New York criticized Midnight Express as "merely anti-Turkish, and hardly a defense of prisoners' rights or a protest against prison conditions." Denby said also that all Turks in the film – guardian or prisoner – were portrayed as "losers" and "swine", and that "without exception [all the Turks] are presented as degenerate, stupid slobs". Bruno Villien of the French magazine Cinématographe also described it as an example of "anti-Turk racism".

Fotogramas called it "One of the most sibylline exercises in racism ever produced, and one peddled under a progressive label to boot. The true story of an American arrested in Turkey for drug trafficking becomes a nightmare resolved with a sensationalism that is impactful yet worthy of a better cause, as is always the case in its director's career."

British historian and author Norman Stone (no relation to screenwriter Oliver) described it as a "brilliant, but quite misleading, film."

Alan Parker stressed that the film did not present an "anti-Turkish" view of the world, remarking that "it is a criticism of the penal system...and could have taken place in any number of countries. The film is basically about injustice."

Billy Hayes criticized the film's negative depiction of Turkey and its people, attributing it to Oliver Stone's screenplay rather than to his own account. Stone apologized for his screenplay in 2004. Hayes returned to Istanbul in June 2007 and apologized for the film’s portrayal of Turkey and its people.

=== Box office ===
The film was made for $2.3 million and grossed over $35 million worldwide.

== Awards and nominations ==
Award	Category	Recipient	Result
Academy Awards	Best Picture	Alan Marshall, David Puttnam	Nominated
Academy Awards	Best Director	Alan Parker	Nominated
Academy Awards	Best Supporting Actor	John Hurt	Nominated
Academy Awards	Best Screenplay – Based on Material from Another Medium	Oliver Stone	Won
Academy Awards	Best Film Editing	Gerry Hambling	Nominated
Academy Awards	Best Original Score	Giorgio Moroder	Won
British Academy Film Awards	Best Film	Alan Parker	Nominated
British Academy Film Awards	Best Direction	Alan Parker	Won
British Academy Film Awards	Best Actor in a Leading Role	Brad Davis	Nominated
British Academy Film Awards	Best Actor in a Supporting Role	John Hurt	Won
British Academy Film Awards	Best Film Editing	Gerry Hambling	Won
British Academy Film Awards	Most Promising Newcomer to Leading Film Roles	Brad Davis	Nominated
Cannes Film Festival	Palme d'Or	Alan Parker	Nominated
Directors Guild of America Awards	Outstanding Directorial Achievement in Motion Pictures	Alan Parker	Nominated
Golden Globe Awards	Best Motion Picture – Drama		Won
Golden Globe Awards	Best Actor in a Motion Picture – Drama	Brad Davis	Nominated
Golden Globe Awards	Best Supporting Actor – Motion Picture	John Hurt	Won
Golden Globe Awards	Best Director – Motion Picture	Alan Parker	Nominated
Golden Globe Awards	Best Screenplay – Motion Picture	Oliver Stone	Won
Golden Globe Awards	Best Original Score – Motion Picture	Giorgio Moroder	Won
Golden Globe Awards	Best Motion Picture Acting Debut – Male	Brad Davis	Won
Golden Globe Awards	Best Motion Picture Acting Debut – Female	Irene Miracle	Won
Grammy Awards	Best Album of Original Score Written for a Motion Picture or Television Special	Giorgio Moroder, Billy Hayes, Oliver Stone	Nominated
Kansas City Film Critics Circle Awards	Best Actor	Brad Davis	Won
Los Angeles Film Critics Association Awards	Best Film		Nominated
Los Angeles Film Critics Association Awards	Best Director	Alan Parker	Runner-up
Los Angeles Film Critics Association Awards	Best Music Score	Giorgio Moroder	Won
National Board of Review Awards	Top Ten Films		6th Place
Political Film Society	Special Award		Won
Writers Guild of America Awards	Best Drama Adapted from Another Medium	Oliver Stone	Won

== Soundtrack ==
Midnight Express: Music from the Original Motion Picture Soundtrack

Soundtrack album by Giorgio Moroder
- Released: 6 October 1978
- Studios: Musicland, Munich, Germany
- Genre: Disco
- Length: 37:00
- Label: Casablanca
- Producer: Giorgio Moroder

Giorgio Moroder chronology
From Here to Eternity (1977)	Midnight Express: Music from the Original Motion Picture Soundtrack (1978)	Music from "Battlestar Galactica" and Other Original Compositions (1978)

Singles from Midnight Express: Music from the Original Motion Picture Soundtrack
- 1. "Chase" Released: 1978

Released on 6 October 1978, by Casablanca Records, the soundtrack to Midnight Express was composed by Italian synth-pioneer Giorgio Moroder. The score won the Academy Award for Best Original Score in 1979.

1. "Chase" – Giorgio Moroder (8:24)
2. "Love's Theme" – Giorgio Moroder (5:33)
3. "(Theme from) Midnight Express (Instrumental)" – Giorgio Moroder (4:39)
4. "Istanbul Blues" (Vocal) – David Castle (3:17)
5. "The Wheel" – Giorgio Moroder (2:24)
6. "Istanbul Opening" – Giorgio Moroder (4:43)
7. "Cacaphoney" – Giorgio Moroder (2:58)
8. "(Theme from) Midnight Express" (Vocal) – Chris Bennett (4:47)

=== Charts ===
Chart (1979)	Peak position
Australia (Kent Music Report)	26

== Legacy ==
In 1978, a made-for-television short documentary entitled I'm Healthy, I'm Alive and I'm Free (alternately The Making of Midnight Express) was released. The seven minute piece features commentary from the cast and crew about the making of the film and footage of Hayes's visit to the prison set.

In October 2010, Hayes, Parker, and Stone were invited to a screening of the film at a prison in Döşemealtı, Turkey, with prisoners in attendance, as part of the 47th Antalya Golden Orange Film Festival .

In 2016, Parker attended Valletta Film Festival to attend a screening of the film at Fort St Elmo.

=== Apologies from Hayes and Stone ===
In an interview recorded during the 1999 Cannes Film Festival Hayes expressed his disappointment with the film adaptation. In an article for the Seattle Post-Intelligencer, Hayes said the film "depicts all Turks as monsters". Hayes travelled to Istanbul in June 2007 where he apologized for the film’s excesses.

In 2004 Oliver Stone, who won an Academy Award for Best Screenplay for the film, apologized for his depiction of Turks and for "tampering with the truth".

=== In popular culture ===
The line "Have you ever been in a Turkish prison?" in the American comedy film Airplane! (1980) is a reference to Midnight Express.

Giorgio Moroder's work "The Chase" is often used as bumper music on the American late-night radio talk show radio program Coast to Coast AM.

"Theme from Midnight Express" is sampled on J Dilla's "Phantom of the Synths", which is prominently used on "Gazzillion Ear", produced by J Dilla and performed by MF Doom, released in 2005 and 2009 respectively.

In the 1996 film The Cable Guy, Chip Douglas (Jim Carrey), visits Steven Kovacs (Matthew Broderick) in jail and parodies the visitation scene from Midnight Express.

== See also ==
- Crime in Turkey
- Return to Paradise
- Brokedown Palace
