= Heaven Can Wait (1978 film) =

1978 film by Warren Beatty and Buck Henry

- Theatrical release poster by Birney Lettick
- Directed by: Warren Beatty; Buck Henry
- Screenplay by: Elaine May; Warren Beatty
- Based on: Heaven Can Wait by Harry Segall
- Produced by: Warren Beatty
- Starring: Warren Beatty; Julie Christie; James Mason; Charles Grodin; Dyan Cannon; Buck Henry; Vincent Gardenia; Jack Warden
- Cinematography: William A. Fraker
- Edited by: Robert C. Jones; Don Zimmerman
- Music by: Dave Grusin
- Distributed by: Paramount Pictures
- Release date: June 28, 1978
- Running time: 101 minutes
- Country: United States
- Language: English
- Budget: $6 million
- Box office: $98.8 million

Heaven Can Wait is a 1978 American sports fantasy comedy-drama film directed by Warren Beatty and Buck Henry about Joe Pendleton, a young man (played by Beatty) mistakenly taken to heaven by his guardian angel The Escort, and the complications involved in undoing the mistake after his earthly body has been cremated. It was the second of three film adaptations of Harry Segall's 1938 play of the same name.

The film was nominated for nine Academy Awards, with Beatty becoming the first and to date only person to be nominated for producing (Best Picture), directing (Best Director with Henry), writing (Best Adapted Screenplay with May) and acting (Best Actor) for the same film, and the film won for Best Art Direction. The cast includes Beatty, Julie Christie and Jack Warden, all of whom had appeared in Shampoo (1975). Jack Warden received a nomination for Best Supporting Actor, his second nomination (the first was for Shampoo).

The film was released on June 28, 1978, by Paramount Pictures, and received positive reviews from critics, while earning a total of $98.8 million against a budget of $6 million, making it a financial success.

== Plot ==
Joe Pendleton, a backup quarterback for the National Football League's Los Angeles Rams, is looking forward to leading his team to the Super Bowl. While he is riding his bicycle through a tunnel, an overzealous guardian angel on his first assignment, known only as the Escort, sees a large truck heading into the other end of the tunnel towards Joe. The Escort plucks Joe out of his body early, in the mistaken belief that Joe was about to be killed, to save him from any suffering.

Once in the afterlife, Joe refuses to believe that his time is up, and upon investigation, Mr. Jordan (the Escort's supervisor) discovers that Joe was going to just narrowly miss the truck and he was not destined to die until March 20, 2025, at 10:17 am. Unfortunately, his body has already been cremated, so a new body must be found for him. After rejecting several possible men who are about to die, Joe is persuaded to accept the body of a multimillionaire industrialist. Leo Farnsworth has just been drugged and drowned in his bathtub by his cheating gold digger wife Julia Farnsworth and her lover Tony Abbott, Leo's personal secretary.

Julia and Tony are amazed when Leo reappears alive and well, and Leo's domestic staff is confused by the changes in some of his habits and tastes. Still obsessed with his football destiny, Leo/Joe buys the Rams and plans to lead them to the Super Bowl as their quarterback. To succeed, he must first convince and then secure the help of his longtime friend and Rams trainer Max Corkle to get his new body in shape. At the same time, he falls in love with Betty Logan, an environmental activist, whom he met when she came to his doorstep to protest the original Leo's corporate policies.

With the Rams about to play in the Super Bowl, all the characters face a crisis. Mr. Jordan informs Joe that he must give up Leo's body, as well. Joe resists, but hints to Betty that she might someday meet someone else, possibly another quarterback, and should think of him. Julia and Tony continue their murderous plans, and Tony finally shoots Leo/Joe dead. The Rams are forced to start Tom Jarrett, another quarterback, in the climactic game. A detective, Lieutenant Krim, interrogates the suspects while they watch the game on television. With the help of Max, he gets Julia and Tony to incriminate each other.

After a brutal hit on the field, Tom is killed. With Mr. Jordan's help, Joe occupies Tom's body and leads the Rams to victory. During the team's postgame celebration, Max finds Tom/Joe, and when he realizes that it is him, they share an emotional embrace. As Tom/Joe is being interviewed on television, Mr. Jordan tells him that to live as Tom Jarrett, he will have to lose his memories of his life as Joe Pendleton and Leo Farnsworth. As Mr. Jordan disappears, Tom/Joe becomes disoriented. Max goes to find him later and is crestfallen to realize that Joe has "left" Tom.

Tom bumps into Betty while leaving the stadium. They strike up a conversation, and each appears to recognize the other, but they do not know how. The lights go out one by one in the stadium as they exit the venue, and Tom says something that reminds Betty of Leo/Joe. Looking into his eyes, Betty remembers what he said to her before and whispers, "You're the quarterback." Tom asks her to go with him for coffee, and she accepts.

== Cast ==
- Warren Beatty as Joe Pendleton
- Julie Christie as Betty Logan
- James Mason as Mr. Jordan
- Jack Warden as Max Corkle
- Charles Grodin as Tony Abbott
- Dyan Cannon as Julia Farnsworth
- Buck Henry as The Escort
- Vincent Gardenia as Krim
- Joseph Maher as Sisk
- Hamilton Camp as Bentley
- Arthur Malet as Everett
- Stephanie Faracy as Corinne
- Jeannie Linero as Lavinia
- Larry Block as Peters
- Frank Campanella as Conway
- Dick Enberg as TV Interviewer
- Dolph Sweet as Head Coach
- R.G. Armstrong as General Manager
- Ed V. Peck as Trainer
- John Randolph as Former Owner
- Will Hare as Team Doctor
- Lee Weaver as Way Station Attendant
- Roger Bowen as Newspaperman
- Keene Curtis as Oppenheim
- Morgan Farley as Middleton
- William Bogert as Lawson
- Peter Tomarken as Reporter
- William Sylvester as Nuclear Reporter
- Jerry Scanlan as Hodges
- Jim Boeke as Kowalsky
- Les Josephson as Owens
- Jack T. Snow as Cassidy
- Byron Webster as Waiter
- Curt Gowdy as TV Commentator
- Al DeRogatis as TV Color Analyst

Several former Los Angeles Rams players have cameo roles in the film, including Deacon Jones, Les Josephson, Jack T. Snow, Jim Boeke, and Charley Cowan. Some well-known sportscasters also appear, playing familiar roles. Curt Gowdy and Al DeRogatis can be heard doing the Super Bowl play-by-play commentary. Dick Enberg conducts an abortive postgame interview of Joe Pendleton/Tom Jarrett. Beatty lobbied hard for Cary Grant to accept the role of Mr. Jordan, going so far as to have Grant's ex-wife, Dyan Cannon, who stars as Julia Farnsworth, urge him to take the role. Although Grant was tempted, he ultimately decided not to end his retirement from film-making.

== Production ==
The music during the comic training scene with Joe Pendleton (Warren Beatty) and the servants at the Farnsworth mansion, as well as the later training session with the Rams is George Frederic Handel's Sonata No. 3 in F Major, performed by Paul Brodie (sopranino saxophone) and Antonin Kubálek (piano). The main theme is the song "Heaven Can Wait" performed by Dave Grusin and the London Symphony Orchestra. Neil Diamond composed a song titled "Heaven Can Wait" specifically for the film that he thought would be a good theme song, but Beatty declined to use it. The Paul McCartney and Wings song "Did We Meet Somewhere Before?" was considered as a theme song for the film, but was ruled out. It later appeared in the film Rock 'n' Roll High School (1979).

The Super Bowl game (Pittsburgh Steelers vs. the Rams) was filmed during halftime of the San Diego Chargers vs. Los Angeles Rams preseason game at the Los Angeles Memorial Coliseum on September 1, 1977. (About a year and a half after the film's release, in January 1980, the Rams and Steelers met in real life in Super Bowl XIV.)

The estate used as Farnsworth mansion was filmed at Filoli, located in Woodside, California, south of San Francisco. Another filming location, albeit brief, was at Evergreen Cemetery in Los Angeles on the grounds beside the Gothic stone chapel in the scene where Joe discovers his body was cremated and scattered on the cemetery grounds.

Videotape was used for effects shots and transferred to 35 mm movie film.

== Other adaptations and sequel ==
This 1978 film was the second of three film adaptations of Harry Segall's 1938 play of the same name. The first adaptation was Here Comes Mr. Jordan (1941). The play and the first film were about a boxer. In this 1978 film, Beatty initially wanted Muhammad Ali to play the central character, but because of Ali's continued commitment to boxing, Beatty changed the character from a boxer to an American football player, and played the character himself. The type of instrument he played was also changed; in Here Comes Mr. Jordan, Pendleton (Robert Montgomery) assays "The Last Rose of Summer" on the alto saxophone, and in this 1978 film, he plays "Ciribiribin" on a soprano sax.

The third adaptation was Down to Earth (2001), starring Chris Rock as comedian Lance Barton.

This 1978 film didn't have a direct sequel. But there was a sequel to the 1941 version, also titled Down to Earth (1947).

The 1982 Hong Kong TVB television drama series You Only Live Twice (飛越十八層) was inspired by this film.

The 1986 Malayalam film Pappan Priyappetta Pappan has a similar storyline.

== Reception ==
=== Critical response ===
On Rotten Tomatoes, the film holds an approval rating of 82% based on 51 reviews. The site's critical consensus reads "A throwback to the high-gloss screwball comedies of the 1940s, Heaven Can Wait beguiles with seamless production values and great comic relief from Charles Grodin and Dyan Cannon." Metacritic gave the film a weighted average score of 72 out of 100 based on 10 critics, indicating "generally favorable" reviews.

Roger Ebert gave the film three out of four and called it "the kind of upbeat screwball comedy Hollywood used to do smoothly and well". Gene Siskel gave the film three-and-a-half out of four and declared it "a delightful film that is both surprisingly fresh and old-fashioned". Vincent Canby of The New York Times wrote that the film "hasn't much personality of its own. Instead, it has a kind of earnest cheerfulness that is sometimes most winning. Mr. Beatty and Miss Christie are performers who bring to their roles the easy sort of gravity that establishes characters of import, no matter how simply they are drawn in the script." Charles Champlin of the Los Angeles Times wrote that "Beatty and his accomplices have brought it off, with only minor patches of turbulence. The script has been expertly contemporized." Gary Arnold of The Washington Post wrote "Heaven Can Wait is easily the most appealing new American movie on the market. It manages to preserve much of the charm and romantic fantasy that worked for its predecessor, the 1941 crowd-pleaser Here Comes Mr. Jordan, while freshening up some of the settings and details and tailoring the roles to a different cast." Penelope Gilliatt of The New Yorker praised the script as "sometimes both loopy and brainy", but asked "good grief, what is all this braininess and talent doing in a remake of a Harry Segall play that has no relation to the real world we come out into from the cinema? One can see why there were films about transmigration and reincarnation during the war, but not now."

=== Awards and nominations ===
| Award | Category | Nominee(s) | Result |
|---|---|---|---|
| Academy Awards | Best Picture | Warren Beatty | Nominated |
| Academy Awards | Best Director | Warren Beatty and Buck Henry | Nominated |
| Academy Awards | Best Actor | Warren Beatty | Nominated |
| Academy Awards | Best Supporting Actor | Jack Warden | Nominated |
| Academy Awards | Best Supporting Actress | Dyan Cannon | Nominated |
| Academy Awards | Best Screenplay – Based on Material from Another Medium | Elaine May and Warren Beatty | Nominated |
| Academy Awards | Best Art Direction | Paul Sylbert, Edwin O'Donovan and George Gaines | Won |
| Academy Awards | Best Cinematography | William A. Fraker | Nominated |
| Academy Awards | Best Original Score | Dave Grusin | Nominated |
| Directors Guild of America Awards | Outstanding Directorial Achievement in Motion Pictures | Warren Beatty and Buck Henry | Nominated |
| Golden Globe Awards | Best Motion Picture – Musical or Comedy | | Won |
| Golden Globe Awards | Best Actor in a Motion Picture – Musical or Comedy | Warren Beatty | Won |
| Golden Globe Awards | Best Supporting Actress – Motion Picture | Dyan Cannon | Won |
| Jupiter Awards | Best International Actor | Warren Beatty | Nominated |
| Saturn Awards | Best Fantasy Film | | Won |
| Saturn Awards | Best Actor | Warren Beatty | Won |
| Saturn Awards | Best Supporting Actor | James Mason | Nominated |
| Saturn Awards | Best Supporting Actress | Dyan Cannon | Won |
| Saturn Awards | Best Director | Warren Beatty and Buck Henry | Nominated |
| Saturn Awards | Best Writing | Elaine May and Warren Beatty | Won |
| Saturn Awards | Best Costumes | Theadora Van Runkle and Richard Bruno | Nominated |
| Saturn Awards | Best Music | Dave Grusin | Nominated |
| Writers Guild of America Awards | Best Comedy Adapted from Another Medium | Elaine May and Warren Beatty | Won |

== See also ==
- List of films about angels
- List of American football films
