= 1978 Academy Awards =

1978 Academy Awards may refer to:

- 50th Academy Awards, the Academy Awards ceremony that took place in 1978
- 51st Academy Awards, the 1979 ceremony honoring the best in film for 1978
