= Sultanahmet Jail =

Former prison in Istanbul, Turkey

Coordinates: 41°0′23″N 28°58′48″E

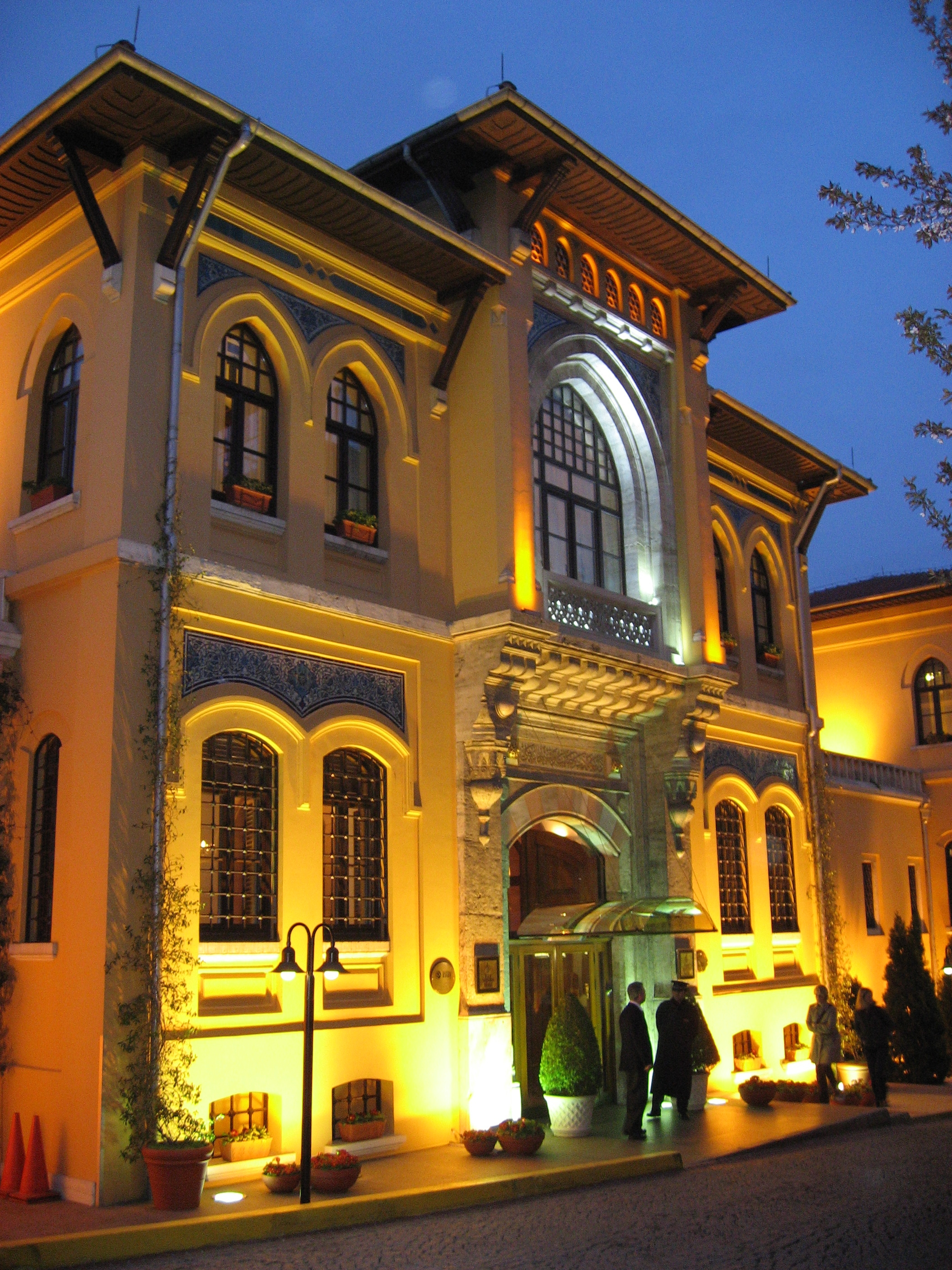
Main entrance of the hotel (former Sultanahmet Jail)

Sultanahmet Jail (Turkish: Sultanahmet Cezaevi), a former prison in Istanbul, Turkey, is now the luxury Four Seasons Hotel at Sultanahmet. It is located in Sultanahmet neighborhood of Fatih district on the historical peninsula.

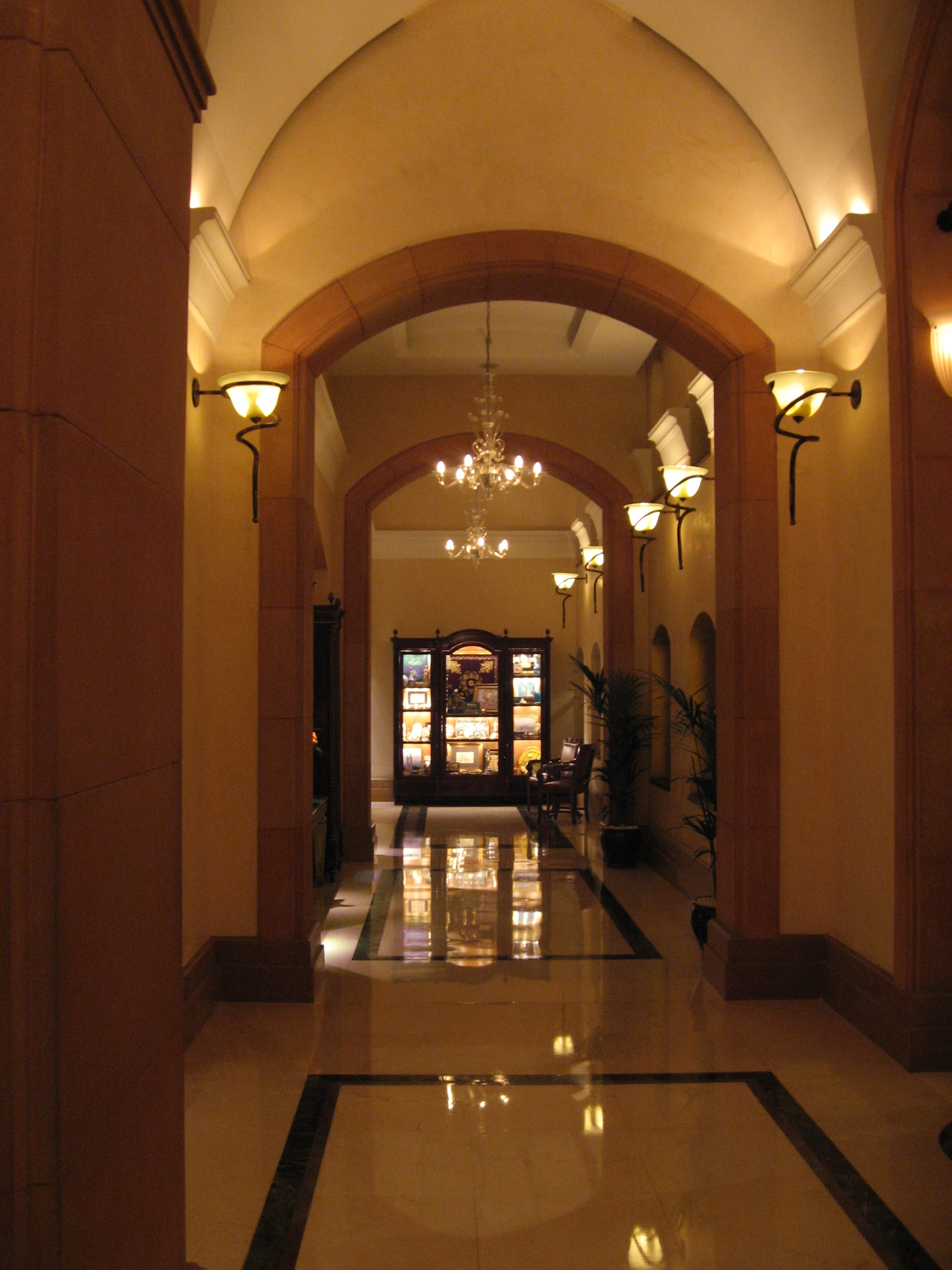
The interior of the Four Seasons Sultanahmet

== History ==
Built in 1918/1919, it was the first jailhouse in the capital of the Ottoman Empire, constructed in a contemporary concept considering the regulation of the daily life and relationship with the outside of inmates, who were awaiting trial or serving brief sentences. The building was designed in Turkish neoclassical style in the beginning of the period called "First National Architecture". It was built next to the courthouse building, which was constructed in 1845 initially as university (Ottoman Turkish: Darülfünun). An inscription in Ottoman language upon the main gate of the building states the name of the facility as the "Dersaadet Murder Jail" (Ottoman Turkish: Dersaadet Cinayet Tevkifhanesi). It is a four-story building with guard towers enclosing a courtyard.

In the jailhouse, juveniles and women were also detained. Following the establishment of the Sağmalcılar prison, the inmates were transferred to the new site and the jail was abandoned on January 25, 1969. Later during the military rule, the building continued to be used as a military jailhouse.

== Notable inmates ==
Sultanahmet Jail served mostly as a prison reserved for writers, journalists, artists as intellectual dissidents sentenced.

- William “Billy” Hayes (1947–) American drug trafficker, co-author of Midnight Express
- Mihri Belli (1916–2011) communist leader
- Deniz Gezmiş (1947–1972) militant
- Nazım Hikmet (1901–1963) poet, in 1938/1939 and later in 1950 again
- Rıfat Ilgaz (1911–1993) lecturer and writer
- Orhan Kemal (1914–1970) novelist
- Hikmet Kıvılcımlı (1902–1971) communist leader
- Aziz Nesin (1915–1995) humorist
- Kemal Tahir (1910–1973) novelist
- Vedat Türkali (1919–2016) screenwriter

== Conversion into hotel ==
In 1992, after a long period of neglect, a redevelopment project was considered to convert the building into a hotel. The jailhouse, having great significance in terms of history of art and architecture, was to undergo a meticulous renovation and open as a deluxe hotel under Regent Hotels & Resorts as The Regent Istanbul. Following the acquisition of Regent by Four Seasons Hotels & Resorts in 1992, the project was rebranded and opened in 1996 as Four Seasons Hotel Istanbul at Sultanahmet.

The hotel does not feature any pool or spa facilities. Instead, guests may book a complimentary shuttle service to use the pool and spa facilities at Four Seasons Hotel Istanbul at the Bosphorus, the chain's sister property in the city, which opened in 2008.

The property closed in 2020 to undergo a comprehensive renovation, and reopened on December 1, 2021.

== In literature ==
The jailhouse was mentioned in Graham Greene's 1932 thriller novel Stamboul Train.

The site is featured in the poem "For Nazim Hikmet in the Old Prison, Now a Four Seasons Hotel" by the American poet Myra Shapiro.

== See also ==
- Hotels in Istanbul
