= Richard Bruno =

American costume designer (1924–2012)

Richard Bruno (August 21, 1924 – January 11, 2012) was an American costume designer, best known for his frequent collaborations with director Martin Scorsese and actor Robert De Niro. His film credits include Heaven Can Wait (1978), Raging Bull (1980), The Color of Money (1986), and Goodfellas (1990), the lattermost of which earned him a BAFTA Award.

Bruno died in Port Townsend, Washington, on January 11, 2012, aged 87.

== Selected filmography ==
Year	Title	Director	Notes
1965	Dr. Goldfoot and the Bikini Machine	Norman Taurog	
1965	The Wild Weird World of Dr. Goldfoot	Mel Ferber	Television special
1967	Devil's Angels	Daniel Haller	
1970	Black Water Gold	Alan Landsburg	Television film
1970	Darker than Amber	Robert Clouse	
1971	Two-Lane Blacktop	Monte Hellman	
1971	The Hired Hand	Peter Fonda	
1971	Something Big	Andrew V. McLaglen	with Ray Summers
1978	Heaven Can Wait	Warren Beatty; Buck Henry	Nominated - Saturn Award for Best Costume Design
1978	Ice Castles	Donald Wrye	
1979	Players	Anthony Harvey	
1980	Raging Bull	Martin Scorsese	with John Boxer
1981	Stripes	Ivan Reitman	
1982	The King of Comedy	Martin Scorsese	
1983	Gorky Park	Michael Apted	
1984	The Karate Kid	John G. Avildsen	with Aida Swinson
1984	Falling in Love	Ulu Grosbard	
1986	Wise Guys	Brian De Palma	
1986	The Color of Money	Martin Scorsese	
1987	Big Shots	Robert Mandel	
1988	Shoot to Kill	Roger Spottiswoode	
1988	Red Scorpion	Joseph Zito	
1989	Casualties of War	Brian De Palma	
1990	Goodfellas	Martin Scorsese	Won - BAFTA Award for Best Costume Design
1991	Guilty by Suspicion	Irwin Winkler	
1991	Out for Justice	John Flynn	
1992	Under Siege	Andrew Davis	
1992	Night and the City	Irwin Winkler	
1995	Under Siege 2: Dark Territory	Geoff Murphy	
1996	Eraser	Chuck Russell	
1997	Hoodlum	Bill Duke	
1998	Species II	Peter Medak	
