= The Divided Trail: A Native American Odyssey =

1978 American short documentary film

- Directed by: Jerry Aronson
- Cinematography: Baird Bryant
- Edited by: Jerry Aronson; Michal Goldman
- Distributed by: Phoenix Films
- Release date: 1978
- Running time: 33 minutes
- Country: United States
- Language: English

The Divided Trail: A Native American Odyssey is a 1978 American short documentary film directed by Jerry Aronson. It was nominated in 1978 for an Academy Award for Best Documentary Short. It lost to The Flight of the Gossamer Condor.
