= Goodnight Miss Ann =

1978 film

- Directed by: August Cinquegrana
- Produced by: August Cinquegrana
- Distributed by: Pyramid Films
- Release date: 1978
- Running time: 10 minutes
- Country: United States
- Language: English

Goodnight Miss Ann is a 1978 American short documentary film directed by August Cinquegrana. It was nominated for an Academy Award for Best Documentary Short The Academy Film Archive preserved Goodnight Miss Ann in 2012.
