= The Flight of the Gossamer Condor =

1978 film

- Directed by: Ben Shedd
- Produced by: Jacqueline Phillips Shedd; Ben Shedd
- Starring: Bryan Allen
- Cinematography: Boyd Estus
- Edited by: Ben Shedd
- Distributed by: Churchill Films
- Release date: 1978
- Running time: 27 minutes
- Country: United States
- Language: English

The Flight of the Gossamer Condor is a 1978 American short documentary film directed by Ben Shedd, about the development of the Gossamer Condor, the first human-powered aircraft, by a team led by Paul MacCready. The Academy Film Archive preserved The Flight of the Gossamer Condor in 2007.

== Reception ==
In the education magazine Media & Methods, David Mallery called Flight of the Gossamer Condor "a film or extraordinary appeal", writing that "the Shedds' most subtle achievement - least flashy, most serving to their subject - is that we are thoroughly caught up in the work of the MacCready group, are intimately a part of their struggles, their determination, their energy." Mallery concludes "It's a joyous experience. I recommend it with special enthusiasm."

The Flight of the Gossamer Condor won an Oscar at the 51st Academy Awards in 1979 for Documentary Short Subject.

== Cast ==
- Bryan Allen as Himself - Final Pilot
- Paul B. MacCready as Himself (as Paul MacCready)
- Tyler MacCready as Himself
- Greg Miller as Himself
- Peter Lissaman (Engineer) as Himself
- Roger Steffens as Narrator (voice)
