= Ben Shedd =

American filmmaker

Ben Shedd is an American director, producer, and writer of film and video. He shared the 1978 Academy Award for Best Documentary Short Film.

== Education ==
He earned a BA from San Francisco State University in 1968 and an MA from the University of Southern California School of Cinematic Arts in 1973.

== Career ==
As a member of the original production team, he worked on the PBS science series Nova. He worked on the first program in 1972 and acted as a director, producer, and writer during Nova’s second and third seasons in 1973-1976.

Since 1985, he has directed and produced giant screen IMAX-type science films, including Seasons and Tropical Rainforest. Ben Shedd has described large-format film and fulldome video as “exploding the frame,” where the frame to which he refers relates to experiences typified by “framed” cinematic art.

== Recognition ==
Ben Shedd shared a Peabody Award for the second season of Nova.

Shedd and Jacqueline Phillips Shedd, producers of The Flight of the Gossamer Condor film, received the 1978 Academy Award for Documentary Short Subject. The film tells the story of history's first successful human powered airplane—designed by inventor Paul MacCready and his team from AeroVironment, flown by pilot Bryan Allen.
