= Birney A. Lettick =

American commercial artist (1919–1986)

Birney A. Lettick (1919–1986) was an American commercial artist. Born in New Haven, Connecticut, he graduated from Yale University. After serving in World War II, he did movie posters and illustrations for Time Magazine. His work is in the collection of the National Portrait Gallery.
