= Billy Hayes (writer) =

American drug trafficker and author

- Born: April 3, 1947 (age 79); New York City, New York, U.S.
- Education: Marquette University 1964–1968 (withdrew)
- Occupations: Writer; Actor; Film Director
- Spouse: Wendy West
- Parent(s): William H. and Dorothy E. Hayes
- Status: Escaped after serving approximately five years in prison
- Conviction: Drug smuggling
- Criminal charges: Drug possession; Drug smuggling
- Penalty: 4 years (1970); Life Imprisonment (1973); Sentence commuted to 30 years (1975)

William "Billy" Hayes (born April 3, 1947) is an American author, entertainer, and convicted drug trafficker. Hayes is best known for his autobiographical book Midnight Express, co-authored with William Hoffer, and its 1978 film adaptation. The works recount his imprisonment in Turkey for attempting to smuggle hashish, and his unlikely escape and repatriation.

== Early life and education ==
William "Billy" Hayes was born on April 3, 1947, in the Bronx, New York City to William Hayes, Sr., a Metropolitan Life Insurance executive, and Dorothy E (Dottie) née Banks, a housewife. He is the oldest of their three children. Hayes attended a Catholic high school in Long Island. He graduated in 1964 and enrolled at Marquette University where he majored in journalism. He described his background as middle class.

Hayes dropped out of college in his senior year at Marquette. He forged a psychiatric report to escape the Vietnam draft.

== Drug trafficking ==
In 1967, Hayes conceived of a plan to smuggle illegal drugs from Turkey to the US to sell. He claimed to have made this plan after learning of a friend who successfully transported hashish from Turkey by hiding it in his money belt.

In April 1969, Hayes traveled to Istanbul, where he bought 2 kg of hashish for US$300 (equivalent to $3,000 in 2025). He had fashioned a leg cast to wear in which he secreted the drug, and returned the US, where he then sold the hashish for a profit of $4,700 (equivalent to $41,000 in 2025).

Hayes would complete two more smuggling trips before being apprehended in Turkey.

=== Arrest, trial and sentencing ===
On his fourth smuggling attempt in October 1970, Hayes was caught carrying 2 kg of hashish by Turkish authorities at Istanbul Airport. The airport was on heightened alert after the Dawson's Field hijackings in 1970 and had introduced new controls for detecting contraband.

Hayes was convicted for possession of hashish and sentenced to four years in prison. In 1973, Hayes learned that the Turkish prosecutor had successfully appealed the four-year sentence (Note: The Nixon administration had recently proclaimed a "War on drugs" in the U.S., prompting the Turkish government to strictly enforce its own drug laws, as it acceded that 80 percent of the heroin smuggled into New York City alone came from Turkey. In 1972 the administration pressured the Turkish government to ban opium cultivation.) and that he was to be re-sentenced for the more serious offense of smuggling. He was given a life sentence on September 10, 1973.

=== Life in prison ===
Hayes was initially imprisoned at Sağmalcılar prison in Istanbul after spending one night in Sultanahmet Jail. He was briefly interred in Bakırköy Psychiatric Hospital in 1972.

Hayes was one of hundreds of U.S citizens in foreign jails at the time of his imprisonment. The State Department sought Hayes's transfer to detention in the United States; the Turkish government refused, arguing that the U.S. was not in a position to dispute a sentence issued by a Turkish court.

In May 1975 the Constitutional Court of Turkey declared amnesty for all drug offenses, which shortened Hayes' sentence from life imprisonment to 30 year. He was finally transferred to İmralı prison in July 1975.

Declassified telegrams from the U.S. State Department indicate that discussions with the Turkish Director of Consular Affairs suggested Hayes might be released and expelled from Turkey in October 1978.

Hayes's father mortgaged the family house to pay Hayes's legal fees and to make extended trips to Turkey for visitation.

=== Escape from prison ===
In 1975, Hayes was transferred to İmralı prison on the island of İmralı in the Sea of Marmara.In October 2, 1975, three months after his arrival, Hayes escaped from İmralı, carrying with him money that his family had sent him in prison. Under cover of night Hayes swam into the harbour and found a dinghy attached to a small cargo ship. He rowed the dinghy 27 km to Bandırma on the Turkish mainland, then took a bus to Istanbul and checked in to a hotel.

He then rode a bus to Edirne on the Greek border. Hayes was refused entry into Greece, but managed to enter by swimming across a river.

Greek security forces caught him the following day. On October 20, 1975, after two weeks of detention and interrogation, Hayes was deported from Thessaloniki to Frankfurt, where he was interrogated by American authorities before being allowed to proceed to the U.S. via Amsterdam. Hayes arrived at John F. Kennedy International Airport on October 24, 1975.

== Midnight Express and life after prison ==
Hayes wrote a memoir with William Hoffer entitled Midnight Express about Hayes's trafficking attempt and his experience in the Turkish prison system. The title is prison slang for an escape. The book was published in 1977 and adapted into the 1978 film of the same name directed by Alan Parker with a screenplay by Oliver Stone. Both the book and the film were met with widespread acclaim and commercial success. Hayes was critical of what he considered the film's unwarranted and overwhelmingly negative depictions of Turkey and the Turkish people, a portrayal which Hayes maintained had originated in Stone's screenplay and not in Hayes's more nuanced, and truthful, account.

Hayes later self-published a pair of sequels to Midnight Express, studied acting and directing, and recounted his imprisonment on television and stage.

== Return to Turkey ==
The Midnight Express film's negative depiction of Turkey and the Turkish people damaged Turkey's reputation in the United States and abroad. American tourism to Turkey dropped, and there were reports of discrimination against Turkish Americans. Many Turks blamed Hayes personally for the film's tone and its consequences. He was widely reviled in Turkey for more than two decades and subject to an entry ban.

In 1999 Hayes publicly expressed regret over the film adaptation's highly negative portrayal of Turkish people and of Turkey’s image. He returned to Istanbul on June 2007, after the Turkish government suspended his entry ban following his public statements, and Hayes apologized for the film’s depiction of the country and its people.
