= A Different Approach =

1978 film

- Directed by: Fern Field
- Written by: Jim Belcher
- Produced by: Jim Belcher; Fern Field
- Starring: Melissa Sue Anderson; Lucie Arnaz; Stockard Channing; Michael Keaton
- Cinematography: Jose Luis Mignone
- Music by: Marvin Laird
- Distributed by: South Bay Mayors' Committee for Employment of the Handicapped
- Release date: 1978
- Running time: 21 minutes
- Country: United States
- Language: English

A Different Approach is a 1978 live-action short film starring Michael Keaton alongside an all-star cast.

== Summary ==
The film is an all-star educational film about the positive side of hiring people with disabilities. A committee of government representatives sits and watch the film Michael Keaton's character's assembled to sell companies on hiring people with disabilities, which takes "a different approach" by combining several approaches—most of them suggested by Hollywood personalities.

== Accolades ==
The film was nominated for an Academy Award for Best Live Action Short Film.
