= Museum of Modern Art Department of Film =

Film department of the Museum of Modern Art

Coordinates: 40.761°N 73.978°W

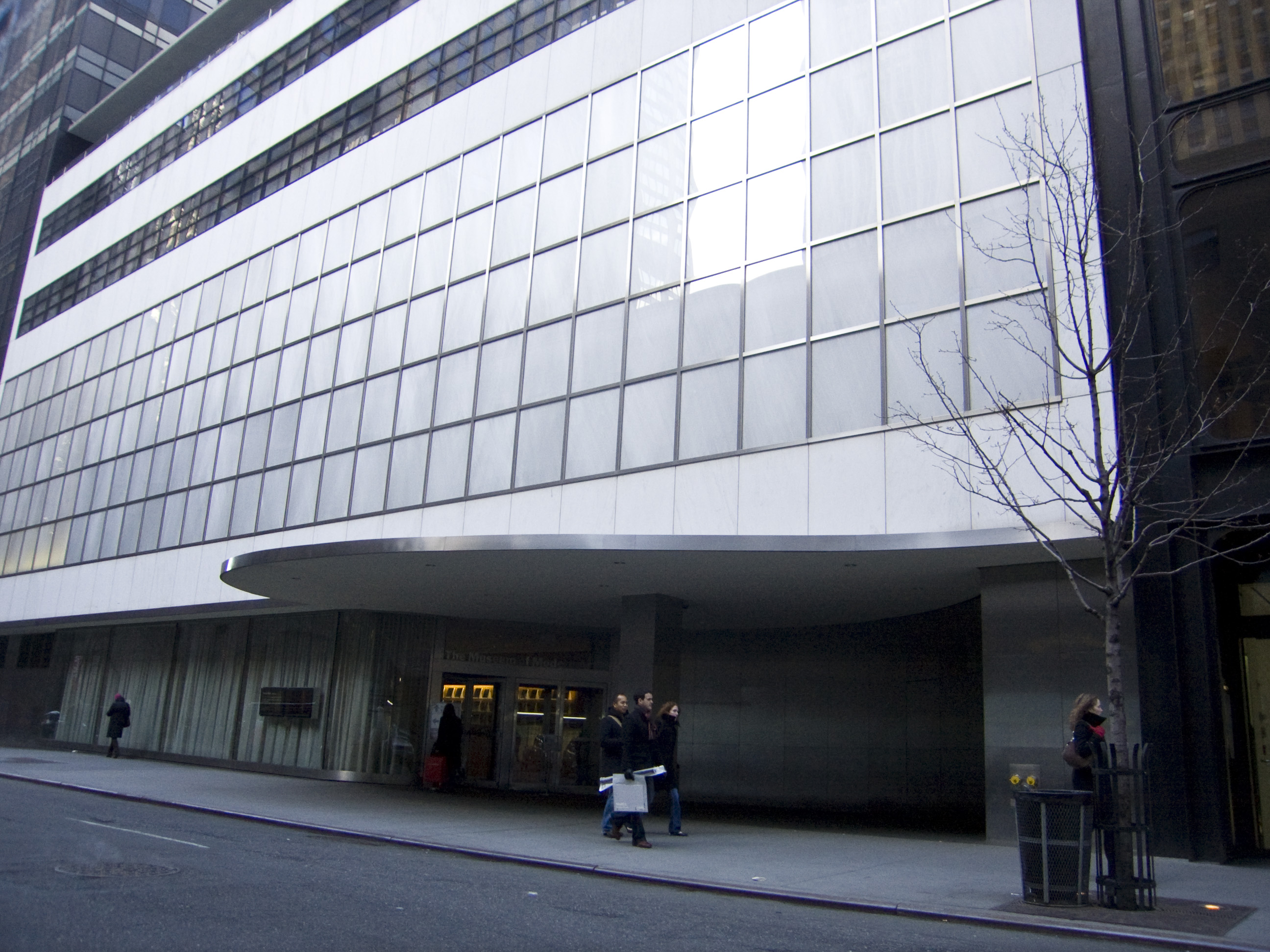
53rd Street MoMA entrance often used by the public for film screenings.

The Museum of Modern Art Department of Film, based in the Museum of Modern Art in New York City, New York, and founded in 1935, contains works of international cinema, focusing on the art and history of the film medium. The collection comprises more than 22,000 films and 4 million film stills.

The department's public film screenings are held at the museum's 53rd Street building. The Celeste Bartos International Film Study Center, also at the 53rd Street building, maintains scholarly resources on film and has facilities for viewing films from the collection for research purposes. The film and film stills collections are stored at the Celeste Bartos Film Preservation Center in Hamlin, Pennsylvania. The department also operates a circulating film and video library.

== Notable films in the collection ==
- Biograph Studio Collection (1905–1914)
- The Country Doctor (1909)
- Edison Company Collection (1912–1914)
- Judith of Bethulia (1914)
- Blind Husbands (1919)
- Tol'able David (1921)
- The Call of the Wild (1923)
- The Marriage Circle (1924)
- Moana (1926)
- The Man Who Laughs (1928)
- Blackmail (1929, sound version)
- Rebecca (1940)
- Spellbound (1945)
- Notorious (1946)
- Empire (1965)
