= Squires of San Quentin =

1978 film

- Produced by: J. Gary Mitchell
- Production company: J. Gary Mitchell Film Company
- Distributed by: MTI Telepictures
- Release date: 1978
- Running time: 30 minutes
- Country: United States
- Language: English

Squires of San Quentin is a 1978 American short documentary film produced by J. Gary Mitchell. It was nominated for an Academy Award for Best Documentary Short. The film was shot in San Quentin State Prison and depicts "The Squires", inmates who attempt to convince troubled children to avoid criminal behavior.
