= Edwin O'Donovan =

American art director

- Born: June 11, 1914
- Died: April 22, 2000 (aged 85)
- Occupation: Art director
- Years active: 1975-1981

Edwin O'Donovan (June 11, 1914 – April 22, 2000) was an American art director. He won an Academy Award in the category Best Art Direction for the film Heaven Can Wait.

== Selected filmography ==
- Heaven Can Wait (1978)
