= Bayrampaşa Prison =

Former prison in Istanbul, Turkey

- Interactive map of Bayrampaşa Prison
- Location: Istanbul, Turkey; 41.0441°N 28.9021°E
- Opened: 1968
- Closed: 18 July 2008
- Former name: Sağmalcılar prison

The Bayrampaşa Prison (Turkish: Bayrampaşa Cezaevi) is a former prison in the Bayrampaşa district of Istanbul Province in Turkey. It was established in 1968 in an area of 120,000m².

== History ==
The construction of the prison was started 1956. 12 years later, in 1968, it was opened with the name Sağmalcılar Prison (Turkish: Sağmalcılar Cezaevi). Inmates of the closing Sultanahmet Jail were moved to Sağmalcılar.

In late 2000, many prisoners across Turkey went on a hunger strike to protest against a cell system in F-type Prisons. On 19 December 2000, an operation called "Hayata Dönüş Operasyonu" was launched in those prisons, which left 32 people dead including 12 prisoners in the Bayrampaşa Prison.

The Turkish Ministry of Justice decided to close the prison because of its works aiming to "close old prisons which not meet contemporary standards and have a bad image, and moving detainees and convicts to newly built modern prisons." The prison was officially closed on 18 July 2008.

2270 houses have been built on the site of the former prison, which sparked controversy in November 2019, when the zoning plan was not accepted by the Municipal Council of Istanbul.

== Notable inmates ==
- William “Billy” Hayes
