= Midnight Express (book) =

1977 book by Billy Hayes and William Hoffer

- First edition
- Author: Billy Hayes, William Hoffer
- Genre: Non-fiction
- Publisher: E. P. Dutton
- Publication date: 1977
- ISBN: 0-525-15605-4

Midnight Express is a 1977 nonfiction book by William “Billy” Hayes and William Hoffer about Hayes's experience in the Turkish prison system. Hayes, an American, was imprisoned in 1970 after Turkish authorities caught him trying to smuggle hashish out of the country to sell in the United States. Hayes and Hoffer's book was adapted into a 1978 feature film of the same name, directed by Alan Parker with a screenplay by Oliver Stone. The film was met with widespread acclaim. Hayes was critical of the film's overwhelmingly negative depiction of Turkey and its people; he attributed the portrayal to Stone's screenplay.

Hayes had completed three successful smuggling trips prior to his apprehension. On his fourth attempt in October 1970, Hayes was caught at Istanbul Airport and initially sentenced to four years in prison for possession of hashish. His offense was then upgraded to the more serious crime of smuggling and his sentence was increased to life imprisonment, later reduced to 30 years. In October 1975, after five years of confinement, Hayes escaped from an island prison by rowboat, crossed into Greece, and returned to the U.S.

== See also ==
- Crime in Turkey

== Editions ==
- Hayes, Billy; Hoffer, William (1977). Midnight Express. E.P. Dutton & Co., Inc. ISBN 978-0-525-15605-5.
