= Robert Altman filmography =

American film director, producer and screenwriter

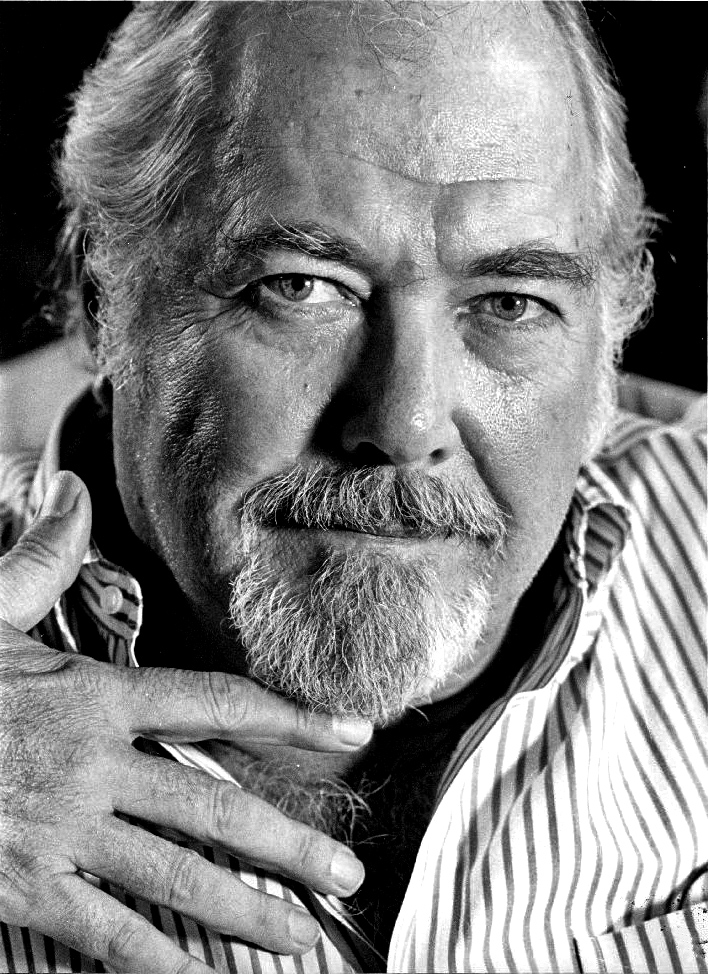
Robert Altman in 1983

Robert Altman was an American film director, producer and screenwriter. He is considered an enduring figure from the New Hollywood era. His films are known for having satirical themes, unexpected quirks, with overlapping and improvised dialogue. He has deconstructed classic film genres like Westerns, crime dramas, musicals and classic whodunits. He has worked with frequent collaborators such as actors Shelley Duvall, Elliott Gould, René Auberjonois, Henry Gibson and Lily Tomlin. Over his career he received five Oscar nominations winning the Honorary Academy Award in 2005.

Altman made his directorial film debut with The Delinquents (1957) and gained his career breakthrough with war comedy M*A*S*H (1970) for which he was nominated for the Academy Award for Best Director. Robert then earned critical acclaim for western drama McCabe & Mrs. Miller (1971), the musical film Nashville (1975), and the psychological thriller 3 Women (1977). During this time he also directed a string of counter cultural genre films such as the black comedy Brewster McCloud (1970), the neo-noir The Long Goodbye (1973), the comedy-drama California Split (1974), the crime film Thieves Like Us (1974), the revisionist western Buffalo Bill and the Indians, or Sitting Bull's History Lesson (1976), and the satirical comedy-drama A Wedding (1978).

He then directed the musical comedy Popeye (1980) which was a financial success but received a mixed reception. The films which followed become more sporadic with a career fluctuations. Roger Ebert stated of Altman's career that he "insisted on expressing a distinct personal vision that made him the hottest director of the 1970s but not the 1980s". During this time he directed the comedy-drama Come Back to the 5 & Dime, Jimmy Dean, Jimmy Dean (1982), the play adaptation Streamers (1983), and the historical drama Secret Honor (1984). He received a career resurgence earning Academy Award for Best Director nominations for the Hollywood mystery The Player (1992), the dark comedy Short Cuts (1993), and the murder mystery Gosford Park (2001). He also directed Vincent & Theo (1990), Prêt-à-Porter (1994), The Company (2003), and A Prairie Home Companion (2006).

== Film ==
=== Features ===
Year	Title	Director	Writer	Producer
1948	Bodyguard	No	Story	No
1957	The James Dean Story (Note: Also credited as editor)	Yes	Yes	Yes
1957	The Delinquents	Yes	Yes	Yes
1967	Countdown	Yes	No	No
1969	That Cold Day in the Park	Yes	No	No
1970	M*A*S*H	Yes	No	No
1970	Brewster McCloud	Yes	No	No
1971	McCabe & Mrs. Miller	Yes	Yes	No
1972	Images	Yes	Yes	No
1973	The Long Goodbye	Yes	No	No
1974	Thieves Like Us	Yes	Yes	No
1974	California Split	Yes	No	Yes
1975	Nashville	Yes	No	Yes
1976	Buffalo Bill and the Indians, or Sitting Bull's History Lesson	Yes	Yes	Yes
1977	3 Women	Yes	Yes	Yes
1978	A Wedding	Yes	Yes	Yes
1979	Quintet	Yes	Yes	Yes
1979	A Perfect Couple	Yes	Yes	Yes
1980	HealtH	Yes	Yes	Yes
1980	Popeye	Yes	No	No
1982	Come Back to the 5 & Dime, Jimmy Dean, Jimmy Dean	Yes	No	No
1983	Streamers	Yes	No	Yes
1984	Secret Honor	Yes	No	Yes
1985	Fool for Love	Yes	No	No
1987	Beyond Therapy	Yes	Yes	No
1987	O.C. and Stiggs	Yes	No	Yes
1990	Vincent & Theo	Yes	No	No
1992	The Player	Yes	No	No
1993	Short Cuts	Yes	Yes	No
1994	Prêt-à-Porter	Yes	Yes	Yes
1996	Kansas City	Yes	Yes	Yes
1998	The Gingerbread Man	Yes	Yes (Note: Credited as Al Hayes)	No
1999	Cookie's Fortune	Yes	No	Yes
2000	Dr. T & the Women	Yes	No	Yes
2001	Gosford Park	Yes	Idea	Yes
2003	The Company	Yes	No	Yes
2006	A Prairie Home Companion	Yes	No	Yes

Producer only

- Welcome to L.A. (1976)
- The Late Show (1977)
- Remember My Name (1978)
- Mrs. Parker and the Vicious Circle (1994)
- Afterglow (1997)
- Trixie (2000)

Executive producer

- Rich Kids (1979)
- Roads and Bridges (2001)

Acting roles

Year	Title	Role	Notes
1947	The Secret Life of Walter Mitty	Man Drinking	Uncredited
1948	Bodyguard	Man Drinking	Uncredited
1970	Events	Bob	
1973	The Long Goodbye	Ambulance Driver	Uncredited
1981	Endless Love	Hotel Manager	

=== Short film ===
Year	Title	Director	Writer	Editor	Notes
1950	Honeymoon for Harriet	No	Yes	Yes	
1952	The Sound of Bells	Yes	Yes	No	
1952	King Basketball	Yes	Yes	No	
1954	The Dirty Look	Yes	Yes	No	
1955	The Perfect Crime	Yes	Yes	No	
1955	Corn's-A-Poppin	No	Yes	No	
1956	The Magic Bond	Yes	Yes	No	
1964	The Party	Yes	No	No	
1965	The Katherine Reed Story	Yes	No	No	
1967	Pot au feu	Yes	No	No	Acting role: Player
1987	Les Boréades	Yes	Yes	Yes	Segment of Aria

Producer

- Liv (1993)

Documentary short

Year	Title	Director	Writer	Editor
1951	Modern Football	Yes	Yes	Yes
1953	The Last Mile	Yes	Yes	No
1953	How To Run a Filling Station	Yes	Yes	No
1953	Modern Baseball	No	No	Yes
1954	Better Football	Yes	Yes	No
1954	The Builders	Yes	Yes	No

== Television ==
Year	Title	Director	Writer	Producer	Notes
1953	Pulse of the City	Yes	Yes	No	Episode "The Case of Capt. Denning"
1957–58	Alfred Hitchcock Presents	Yes	No	No	Episodes "The Young One" and "Together"
1958	M Squad	Yes	No	No	Episode "Lover's Lane Killing"
1959	Hawaiian Eye	Yes	No	No	Episode "Three Tickets to Lani"
1958–59	The Millionaire	Yes	Yes	No	13 episodes
1958–59	Whirlybirds	Yes	No	No	20 episodes
1959–60	Sugarfoot	Yes	No	No	2 episodes
1959–60	Troubleshooters	Yes	Yes	No	14 episodes
1959–60	U.S. Marshal	Yes	No	No	15 episodes
1960	The Gale Storm Show	Yes	No	No	Episode "It's Magic"
1960	Bronco	Yes	No	No	Episode "The Mustangers"
1960	Maverick	Yes	Yes	No	Episode "Bolt from the Blue"
1960–61	The Roaring 20's	Yes	No	No	9 episodes
1960–61	Bonanza	Yes	No	No	8 episodes
1961	Lawman	Yes	No	No	Episode "The Robbery"
1961	Surfside 6	Yes	No	No	Episode "Thieves Among Honor"
1961	Peter Gunn	Yes	No	No	Episode "The Murder Bond"
1961	Route 66	Yes	No	No	Episode "Some of the People, Some of the Time"
1961–62	Bus Stop	Yes	Yes	No	8 episodes
1962	Cain's Hundred	Yes	No	No	Episode "The Left Side of Canada"
1962	Kraft Television Theatre	Yes	No	No	3 episodes
1962	The Gallant Men	Yes	No	No	Episode "Pilot"
1962–63	Combat!	Yes	Yes	Yes	10 episodes
1963–64	Kraft Suspense Theatre	Yes	Yes	Yes	3 episodes
1965	The Long, Hot Summer	Yes	No	No	Episode "The Long, Hot Summer"
1968	Premiere	Yes	Yes	Yes	Episode "Walk in the Sky"
1977	Saturday Night Live	Yes	No	No	Episode "Sissy Spacek/Richard Baskin" (Segment "Sissy's Role")
1988	Tanner '88	Yes	No	Executive	Miniseries
1993, 1997	Great Performances	Yes	Yes	Yes	Episodes "Black and Blue", "The Real McTeague: A Synthesis of Form", and "Jazz '34"
1993	Gun	Yes	No	Executive	Episode "All the President's Women"
1998	Killer App	Yes	No	No	Unaired pilot
2004	Tanner on Tanner	Yes	No	Executive	Miniseries

Television films

Year	Title	Director	Producer
1964	Nightmare in Chicago	Yes	Yes
1982	Rattlesnake in a Cooler	Yes	Executive
1982	Precious Blood	Yes	Executive
1985	The Laundromat	Yes	No
1987	Basements: The Room / The Dumb Waiter	Yes	Yes
1988	The Caine Mutiny Court-Martial	Yes	Yes

== Theatre ==
Year	Title	Author	Venue	Ref.
1952	Hope Is the Thing with Feathers	Richard Harrity	Resident Theatre, Kansas City	
1981	2 By South: Rattlesnake in a Cooler and Precious Blood	Frank South	Los Angeles Actors' Theater	
1981	2 By South: Rattlesnake in a Cooler and Precious Blood	Frank South	St. Clement's Theater, New York City	
1982	Come Back to the 5 & Dime, Jimmy Dean, Jimmy Dean	Ed Graczyk	Martin Beck Theater, Broadway	
1983	The Rake's Progress	Igor Stravinsky	University of Michigan, Ann Arbor	
1987	The Rake's Progress	Igor Stravinsky	Opéra de Lille, Lille	
1992	McTeague	William Bolcom	Lyric Opera of Chicago, World premiere	
2004	A Wedding	William Bolcom	Lyric Opera of Chicago, World premiere	
2006	Resurrection Blues	Arthur Miller	Old Vic Theatre, London	

== Music video ==
Year	Title	Artist
1966	"Girl Talk"	Bobby Troup
1966	"The Party"	Herb Alpert and the Tijuana Brass
1966	"Speak Low"	Lili St. Cyr
1966	"Ebb Tide"	Lili St. Cyr

== Unrealized projects ==
Year	Title and description	Ref.
1960s	Death, Where is Thy Sting-a-ling-ling?, retitled from The Chicken and the Hawk	
1970s	The Extra, a film about Hollywood bit players starring Lily Tomlin	
1970s	92 in the Shade	
1970s	North Dallas Forty	
1970s	A film adaptation of Kurt Vonnegut's novel Breakfast of Champions written by Alan Rudolph starring Burt Lancaster	
1970s	Ragtime	
1970s	The Y.I.G. Epoxy, a film adaptation of Robert Grossbach's novel Easy and Hard Ways Out written by Alan Rudolph starring Peter Falk, Sterling Hayden and Henry Gibson	
1980s	White Mansons, retitled from Vicksburg, a drama set during the American Civil War	
1980s	A film adaptation of James McLure's one-act play Lone Star starring Sigourney Weaver and Powers Boothe	
1980s	The Smith County Widow, a "serious" comedy-mystery-farce starring Malcolm McDowell and Mary Steenburgen	
1980s	A film adaptation of Marsha Norman's play The Holdup	
1980s	A film adaptation of Jim Leonard, Jr.'s two-act play The Diviners starring William Hurt	
1980s	A film adaptation of Thomas Berger's novel The Feud written by Jim Leonard, Jr.	
1980s	Biarritz, a film set in a European hotel for wealthy vacationers written by Robert Harders starring Jon Voight	
1980s	A film adaptation of Ernest Hemingway's novel Across the River and Into the Trees written by Robert Harders starring Roy Scheider and Julie Christie	
1980s	Heat	
1980s	Nashville 12, a sequel to Nashville written by Robert Harders set twelve years later	
1980s	Rossini! Rossini!	
1990s	An untitled biopic on the life of actress Jean Seberg	
1990s	Mata Hari, a biopic written by David Williamson and Julie Talen based on the life of Danish entertainer Mata Hari starring Cate Blanchett	
1990s	A film adaptation of Peter Everett's novel A Death In Ireland written by Tom Berenger	
1990s	A film adaptation of Tony Kushner's two-part play Angels in America	
1990s	Cork, a film written by Harry Belafonte about subject of blackface and minstrel shows set in the era of Amos 'n' Andy	
1990s	The Singing Detective starring Dustin Hoffman	
1990s	Stamp and Deliver, a "modern-day postal Western" written by Dan Mirvish starring Peter Fonda, Mark Hamill, Dom DeLuise and Ed Asner	
1990s	More Short Cuts, a sequel to Short Cuts written by Anne Rapp	
1990s	A film adaptation of Dominick Dunne's novel Another City, Not My Own	
2000s	A film adaptation of Artie Shaw's unpublished autobiography The Education of Albie Snow starring Johnny Depp	
2000s	Voltage, a film adaptation of Robert Grossbach's novel A Shortage of Engineers starring Liv Tyler, Philip Seymour Hoffman, Steve Buscemi, Joaquin Phoenix, William H. Macy, Tony Shalhoub, Harry Belafonte, Elliott Gould and Taye Diggs	
2000s	Gambit	
2000s	The Widow Claire, a "period romance" set during World War II starring Winona Rider, Jake Gyllenhaal and Matthew McConaughey	
2000s	Paint, retitled from Ultraviolent, a film set in the New York art gallery scene starring Salma Hayek, James Franco and Glenn Close	
2000s	An Unfinished Life	
2000s	A film adaptation of Aesop's fable "The Tortoise and the Hare" written by Andrew Davies starring Emma Thompson	
2000s	It's Always Now, a film adaptation of Raymond Chandler's short story "The Curtain" starring Elliott Gould as Philip Marlowe	
2000s	A fictionalized film version based on S. R. Bindler's 1997 documentary Hands on a Hardbody written by Stephen Harrigan starring Hilary Swank, Meryl Streep, Billy Bob Thornton, Jack Black, Jack White, Chris Rock, Dwayne Johnson, Lily Tomlin and Tommy Lee Jones	
