= List of awards and nominations received by Robert Altman =

Robert Altman awards and nominations
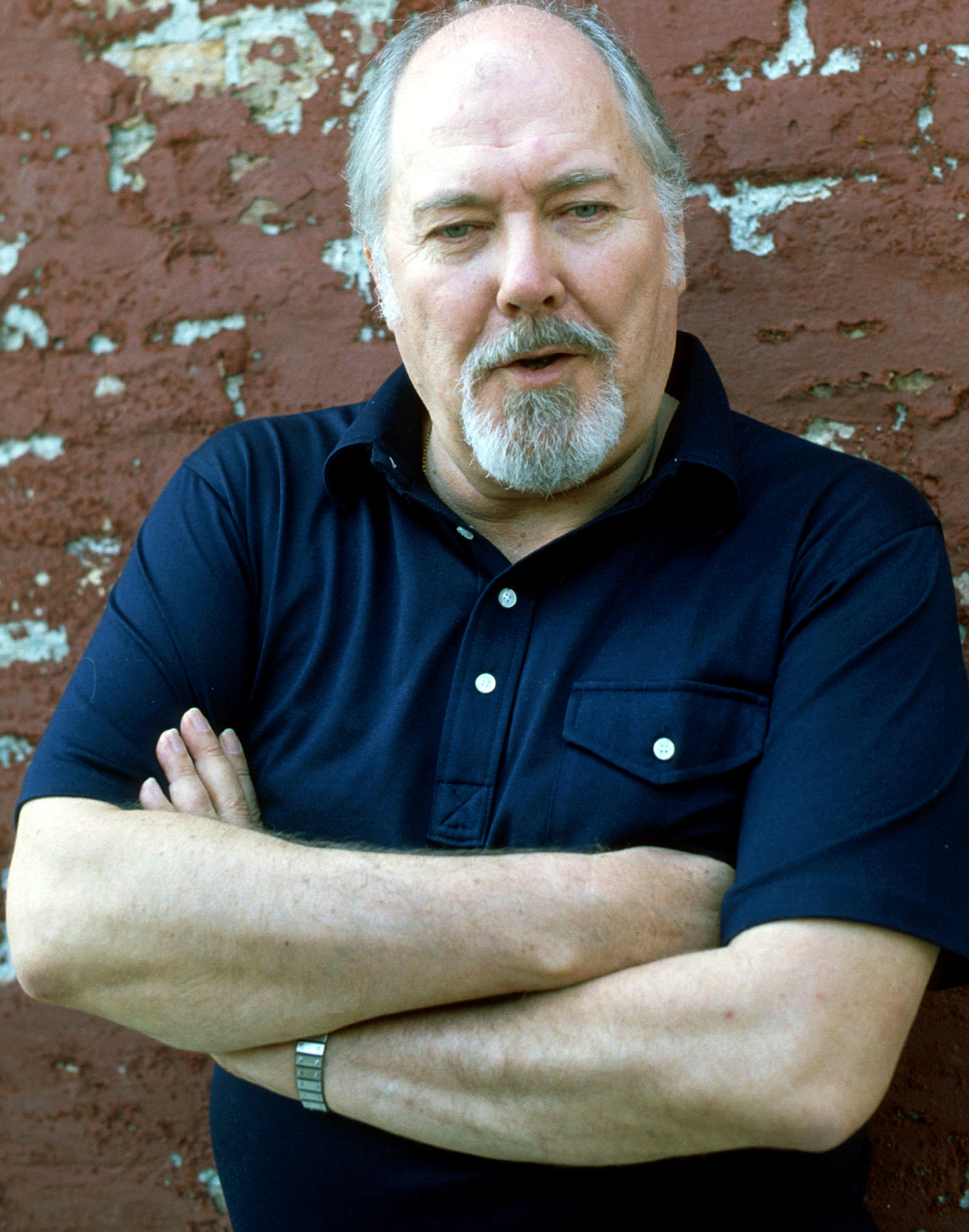
- Altman at the 1982 Venice Film Festival
Awards and nominations
Award	Wins	Nominations
Academy Awards	1	8
British Academy Film Awards	2	7
Emmy Awards	1	2
Golden Globe Awards	1	5

Totals (Note: Certain award groups do not simply award one winner. They acknowledge several different recipients, have runners-up, and have third place. Since this is a specific recognition and is different from losing an award, runner-up mentions are considered wins in this award tally. For simplification and to avoid errors, each award in this list has been presumed to have had a prior nomination.)
- Wins: 35
- Nominations: 88

The following article is a List of awards and nominations received by Robert Altman.

Robert Altman was an American film director, producer, and screenwriter. He has received several awards including two British Academy Film Awards, a Primetime Emmy Award and a Golden Globe Award as well as nominations for seven Academy Awards.

He is known for such films as the war comedy M*A*S*H (1970), the revisionist western McCabe & Mrs. Miller (1971), the neo-noir The Long Goodbye (1973), the dramedy film California Split (1974), the satirical musical film Nashville (1975), the drama 3 Women (1977), the comedy A Wedding (1978), the musical comedy Popeye (1980), the drama Secret Honor (1984), the black comedy The Player (1992), the ensemble film Short Cuts (1993), the British murder mystery film Gosford Park (2001), and A Prairie Home Companion (2006).

Altman received various awards and nominations including seven Academy Award nominations winning the Honorary Oscar in 2006. He received seven British Academy Film Award nominations winning twice for The Player (1992), and Gosford Park (2001). He received the Primetime Emmy Award for Outstanding Directing for a Drama Series for Tanner '88 (1988). He also received five Golden Globe Award nominations winning the Golden Globe Award for Best Director for Gosford Park. He also received various awards from film festivals including the Cannes Film Festival's prestigious Palme d'Or for M*A*S*H and the Cannes Film Festival Award for Best Director for The Player.

He has received numerous honorary awards including Berlin International Film Festival's Golden Bear, and the Venice Film Festival's Golden Lion. In 1994, he received the Directors Guild of America Lifetime Achievement Award.

== Major associations ==
=== Academy Awards ===
Year	Category	Nominated work	Result	Ref.
1971	Best Director	MASH	Nominated	
1976	Best Picture	Nashville	Nominated	
1976	Best Director	Nashville	Nominated	
1993	Best Director	The Player	Nominated	
1994	Best Director	Short Cuts	Nominated	
2002	Best Director	Gosford Park	Nominated	
2002	Best Picture	Gosford Park	Nominated	
2006	Academy Honorary Award		Won	

=== BAFTA Awards ===
Year	Category	Nominated work	Result	Ref.
British Academy Film Awards
1971	Best Direction	MASH	Nominated	
1979	Best Direction	A Wedding	Nominated	
1979	Best Screenplay	A Wedding	Nominated	
1993	Best Film	The Player	Nominated	
1993	Best Direction	The Player	Won	
2002	Best British Film	Gosford Park	Won	
2002	Best Director	Gosford Park	Nominated	

=== Emmy Awards ===
Year	Category	Nominated work	Result	Ref.
Primetime Emmy Awards
1989	Directing in a Drama Series	Tanner '88: The Boiler Room	Won	
1993	Directing in a Variety or Music Program	Great Performances: Black and Blue	Nominated	

=== Golden Globe Awards ===
Year	Category	Nominated work	Result	Ref.
1971	Best Director	MASH	Nominated	
1976	Best Director	Nashville	Nominated	
1993	Best Director	The Player	Nominated	
1994	Best Screenplay	Short Cuts	Nominated	
2002	Best Director	Gosford Park	Won	

== Festival awards ==
=== Cannes Film Festival ===
Year	Category	Nominated work	Result	Ref.
1970	Palme d'Or	MASH	Won	
1972	Palme d'Or	Images	Nominated	
1977	Palme d'Or	3 Women	Nominated	
1986	Palme d'Or	Fool for Love	Nominated	
1987	Palme d'Or	Aria	Nominated	
1992	Palme d'Or	The Player	Nominated	
1992	Best Director	The Player	Won	
1996	Palme d'Or	Kansas City	Nominated	

=== Berlin International Film Festival ===
Year	Category	Nominated work	Result	Ref.
1976	Golden Bear	Buffalo Bill and the Indians, or Sitting Bull's History Lesson	Won	
1985	FIPRESCI Prize	Secret Honor	Won	
1999	Golden Bear	Cookie's Fortune	Nominated	
1999	Prize of the Guild	Cookie's Fortune	Won	
2002	Honorary Golden Bear	—N/a	Won	
2006	Golden Bear	A Prairie Home Companion	Nominated	
2006	Reader Jury	A Prairie Home Companion	Won	

=== Venice Film Festival ===
Year	Category	Nominated work	Result	Ref.
1983	Golden Lion	Streamers	Nominated	
1993	Golden Lion	Short Cuts	Won	
1993	FIPRESCI Prize	Short Cuts	Won	
1993	Pasinetti Award	Short Cuts	Won	
1996	Golden Lion for Lifetime Achievement	—N/a	Won	
2000	Golden Lion	Dr T and the Women	Nominated	

== Industry awards ==
=== Independent Spirit Awards ===
Year	Category	Nominated work	Result	Ref.
1993	Best Director	Short Cuts	Won	
1993	Best Screenplay	Short Cuts	Won	
1994	Best Feature	Mrs. Parker and the Vicious Circle	Nominated	
1999	Best Feature	Cookie's Fortune	Nominated	
2006	Best Director	A Prairie Home Companion	Nominated	

=== Directors Guild of America Award ===
Year	Category	Nominated work	Result	Ref.
1971	Outstanding Directorial in Motion Pictures	MASH	Nominated	
1976	Outstanding Directorial in Motion Pictures	Nashville	Nominated	
1993	Outstanding Directorial in Motion Pictures	The Player	Nominated	
1994	Lifetime Achievement Award	—N/a	Won	
2005	Outstanding Directing - Miniseries or Movie	Tanner on Tanner	Nominated	

=== Writers Guild of America Award ===
Year	Category	Nominated work	Result	Ref.
1971	Best Drama Adapted from Another Medium	McCabe & Mrs. Miller	Nominated	
1972	Best Drama Written Directly for the Screen	Images	Nominated	
1978	Best Comedy Written Directly for the Screen	A Wedding	Nominated	
