= Robert Reed Altman =

American cinematographer (born 1959)

Robert Altman
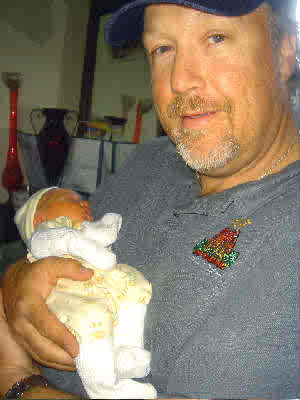
- Altman holding his daughter, March 2008
- Born: Robert Reed Altman; December 22, 1959 (age 66); Los Angeles, California, U.S.
- Occupations: Camera operator, director of photography
- Years active: 1975-present
- Children: 1

Robert Reed Altman (born December 22, 1959) is an American cinematographer. He has served as a camera operator and director of photography on feature films and television series since the 1970s. He is the son of filmmaker Robert Altman and Kathryn Reed.

== Career ==
Altman began his career serving as focus puller and second assistant camera on the films such as: Nashville (1975), Buffalo Bill and the Indians (1976), A Wedding (1978), Popeye (1980), Health (1982), Come Back to the Five and Dime, Jimmy Dean, Jimmy Dean (1982), Streamers (1983), and Fool for Love (1985).

Altman moved to television, where he served as camera operator on the TV series Alien Nation (1989), Tales of the City (1993), Melrose Place (1992), and Robert Altman's Gun (1997). Altman also served as second unit director of photography on the hit TV series The Wonder Years.

In 2004, Altman served as director of photography on director Robert Altman and writer/cartoonist Garry Trudeau's Tanner on Tanner. Premiering at the Sundance Film Festival, the film was a follow-up to their documentary-style Emmy-winning film, Tanner '88. The new "Tanner", a four-part series following the new adventures of fictional presidential nominee Tanner, was filmed to coincide with the Bush-Kerry elections.

In between his work for television, Altman continues to return to feature filmmaking as a camera operator or cinematographer. Credits include Looking for Trouble for Roger Corman; several projects directed by Robert Altman, Kansas City (1996), The Gingerbread Man (1998), Cookie's Fortune (1999) and Dr. T & the Women (2000), as well as Jay and Silent Bob Strike Back (2001) directed by Kevin Smith, and The Scorpion King (2002) starring the Rock.

Altman last worked with his father on A Prairie Home Companion. Altman worked on the network shows Boston Legal, The O.C., Bones and Lost.

== Personal life ==
Altman was married to Barbara Ann Altman but was divorced in 2022 and has one daughter, Cora Kathryn Ann Altman.
