= The Long Goodbye (film) =

1973 film by Robert Altman

- Theatrical release poster
- Directed by: Robert Altman
- Screenplay by: Leigh Brackett
- Based on: The Long Goodbye by Raymond Chandler
- Produced by: Jerry Bick
- Starring: Elliott Gould; Nina van Pallandt; Sterling Hayden
- Cinematography: Vilmos Zsigmond
- Edited by: Lou Lombardo
- Music by: John Williams
- Production company: Lion's Gate Films
- Distributed by: United Artists
- Release date: March 7, 1973
- Running time: 112 minutes
- Country: United States
- Language: English
- Budget: $1.7 million
- Box office: $959,000

The Long Goodbye is a 1973 American satirical neo-noir film directed by Robert Altman, adapted by Leigh Brackett from Raymond Chandler's 1953 novel of the same name. The film stars Elliott Gould as Philip Marlowe along with Nina van Pallandt, Sterling Hayden, Mark Rydell, Henry Gibson, David Arkin, and Jim Bouton, and has an early, uncredited appearance by Arnold Schwarzenegger.

The story's setting was moved from the 1940s to 1970s Hollywood. The film has been called "a study of a moral and decent man cast adrift in a selfish, self-obsessed society where lives can be thrown away without a backward glance ... and any notions of friendship and loyalty are meaningless."

United Artists released the film on March 7, 1973. It received mixed to positive reviews upon release, but its critical assessment has grown over time. In 2021, the Library of Congress selected the film for preservation in the United States National Film Registry as "culturally, historically, or aesthetically significant".

== Plot ==
Terry Lennox shows up at the Los Angeles apartment of his close friend, down-on-his-luck private eye Philip Marlowe, claiming he is in trouble and asking for a ride to Tijuana, Mexico. Returning from Tijuana, Marlowe learns that Terry's wife, Sylvia, was murdered. He is arrested on suspicion of being an accomplice, but soon released after Mexican authorities report that Terry has committed suicide in Mexico and admitted to killing his wife in a suicide note. Marlowe refuses to believe Terry was guilty.

Meanwhile, Eileen Wade hires Marlowe to find her missing husband, macho, alcoholic, and self-destructive novelist Roger Wade. Marlowe learns that the Wades were the Lennoxes' neighbors in Malibu Colony. He finds Roger at a rehab clinic and brings him home, but before they leave, the clinician, Dr. Verringer, demands payment for his services and vows to see Roger again.

Local gangster Marty Augustine and his henchmen rough Marlowe up at his apartment and demand that he help recover $355,000 that Terry was hired to deliver to Augustine's associates in Mexico City. Once they leave, Marlowe follows them to the Wades' house, where he sees Eileen and Augustine having a heated conversation. This leads him to conclude that the Wades are connected to the Lennoxes' deaths. He later learns that Roger owes Augustine a significant sum of money.

Marlowe travels to Mexico, but the Mexican police stick to their story. He returns to Malibu, where the Wades are hosting a party. Dr. Verringer crashes the party, once again demanding payment and slapping Roger. Although Roger drunkenly insults him, he pays Dr. Verringer and ends the party. Later that night, he walks into the ocean to commit suicide. Eileen and Marlowe rush into the water after him but cannot save him.

Hoping that Terry is still alive, Marlowe theorizes that Roger was having an affair with Sylvia and killed her to hide his infidelity, forcing Terry to flee the country. He badgers Eileen, who reluctantly confirms his theory. Marlowe asks the police to reopen the Lennox investigation; they dismiss his theory but confirm that Roger met with Sylvia before going to rehab.

Marlowe receives a goodbye letter from "Terry", with a rare $5,000 bill enclosed. Marlowe meets Augustine in his office, where upon discovering the bill, Augustine grows suspicious, noting that the money Terry was delivering included three such bills. Augustine threatens to cut Marlowe's genitalia off, but Terry's money arrives in the nick of time. Augustine lets Marlowe go and gives him the bill for his troubles. Outside, Marlowe glimpses Eileen driving away. He runs after her, but she does not acknowledge him, and he is hit by a car during the pursuit. Following a brief hospital stay, he finds that Eileen has sold her house and disappeared.

Marlowe returns to Mexico, where upon bribing local officials with the $5,000 bill, he learns that they were paid by a man with another $5,000 bill to fake Terry's suicide. Marlowe tracks Terry down at a Mexican villa. Terry explains that there was in fact an affair, but it was between him and Eileen. Roger discovered the affair and told Sylvia, who confronted Terry. Terry then killed Sylvia during a violent argument and fled. Terry gloats that no one cares about the case anymore since he is legally dead and Augustine got his money back. Marlowe asks Terry why he was framed as a suspect, but Terry dismissively calls him a "born loser". In response, Marlowe fatally shoots Terry.

As Marlowe walks away, he passes Eileen, who is driving to meet Terry. She is shocked to see him there, but continues on. Having obtained his revenge, Marlowe happily strolls down the road.

== Cast ==
- Elliott Gould as Philip Marlowe
- Nina van Pallandt as Eileen Wade
- Sterling Hayden as Roger Wade
- Mark Rydell as Marty Augustine
- Henry Gibson as Dr. Verringer
- David Arkin as Harry
- Jim Bouton as Terry Lennox
- Warren Berlinger as Morgan
- Pancho Córdova as Doctor
- Enrique Lucero as Jefe
- Rutanya Alda as Rutanya Sweet
- Jack Riley as Riley
- Jerry Jones as Det. Green
- John Davies as Det. Dayton
- Ken Sansom as Colony Guard

Uncredited

- David Carradine as Dave "Socrates"
- Danny Goldman as Bartender
- Carl Gottlieb as Wade's Party Guest
- Arnold Schwarzenegger as Hood in Augustine's Office

== Development ==
It took a number of years for a film of The Long Goodbye to be made, although a television production with Dick Powell was released in 1954. On Chandler's death in 1959, the only of his Marlowe novels that had not been made into films were The Little Sister, The Long Goodbye, and Playback. Playback remains unadapted.

In October 1965 it was announced that producers Elliott Kastner and Jerry Gershwin held the rights to Goodbye and would film it the following year in Los Angeles and Mexico. In 1967, producer Gabriel Katzka had the rights. He wanted to make it as a follow-up to the adaptation of The Little Sister (which became Marlowe). Stirling Silliphant, who wrote Marlowe, wrote a script, but the film was not made and MGM let its option lapse. Kastner and producer Jerry Bick bought the rights back and made a production deal with United Artists to finance a film. Chandler's books were selling as well in the early 1970s as they had while he was alive.

=== Leigh Brackett ===
The producers commissioned a screenplay from Leigh Brackett, who had been Kastner's client when he was an agent and had written the script for the Humphrey Bogart version of The Big Sleep. Brackett:

set the deal with United Artists, and they had a commitment for a film with Elliott Gould, so either you take Elliott Gould or you don't make the film. Elliott Gould was not exactly my idea of Philip Marlowe, but anyway there we were. Also, as far as the story was concerned, time had gone by—it was twenty-odd years since the novel was written, and the private eye had become a cliché. It had become funny. You had to watch out what you were doing. If you had Humphrey Bogart at the same age that he was when he did The Big Sleep, he wouldn't do it the same way. Also, we were faced with a technical problem of this enormous book, which was the longest one Chandler ever wrote. It's tremendously involuted and convoluted. If you did it the way he wrote it, you would have a five-hour film.

Brian G. Hutton, who had made a number of movies for Kastner, was originally attached as director and Brackett says Hutton wanted the script structured so that "the heavy had planned the whole thing from the start" but when writing it she found the idea contrived.

The script deviates markedly from Chandler's novel; Brackett took many liberties with the story, plot, and characters. In the film, Marlowe kills his best friend, Terry Lennox. Lennox did kill his own wife, because she discovered he was having an affair with Eileen, and he admits this to Marlowe. Neither Sylvia Lennox, her sister, nor her father appears in the film; Roger Wade commits suicide, rather than being murdered; and gangster Marty Augustine and his subplots are additions to the film. Bernie Ohls, Marlowe's sometime friend on the LAPD, is also absent.

The film quotes from the novel when Marlowe, under police interrogation, asks, "Is this where I'm supposed to say, 'What's all this about?' and he [the cop] says, 'Shut up! I ask the questions'?"

Throughout the film are stylistic nods to the Chandler novels and 1950s American culture. Marlowe drives a 1948 Lincoln Continental convertible Cabriolet, in contrast with the contemporary cars others drive. Marlowe also chain smokes in the film, in contrast with a health-conscious California; no one else smokes on screen.

A "making-of" featurette on the DVD is titled "Rip van Marlowe", a reference to the character Rip Van Winkle, to emphasize the contrast between Marlowe's anachronistic 1950s behavior and the film's 1970s setting.

=== Robert Altman ===
The producers offered the script to both Howard Hawks and Peter Bogdanovich to direct. Both declined, but Bogdanovich recommended Robert Altman. United Artists president David Picker may have picked Gould to play Marlowe as a ploy to get Altman to direct. At the time, Gould was in professional disfavor because of his rumored troubles on the set of A Glimpse of Tiger, in which he bickered with costar Kim Darby, fought with director Anthony Harvey, and acted erratically. Consequently, he had not worked in nearly two years; nevertheless, Altman convinced Bick that Gould suited the role. United Artists had Gould undergo the usual employment medical examination, and a psychological examination attesting to his mental stability. In January 1972 it was announced that Altman and Gould would make the film. Altman called it "a satire in melancholy".

Brackett had problems with Chandler's plot, which she felt was "riddled with cliches", and faced the choice of making it a period piece or updating it. Altman received a copy of the script while shooting Images in Ireland. He liked the ending because it was so out of character for Marlowe. He agreed to direct as long as the ending was not changed. Brackett recalled meeting Altman while he was making Images: "We conferred about ten o'clock in the morning and yakked all day, and I went back to the hotel and typed all the notes and went back the next day. In a week we had it all worked out. He was a joy to work with. He had a very keen story mind." Altman and Brackett spent a lot of time discussing the plot. Altman wanted Marlowe to be a loser. He even nicknamed Gould's character Rip Van Marlowe, as if he had been asleep for 20 years, awakened, and was wandering around Los Angeles in the early 1970s but "trying to invoke the morals of a previous era".

Brackett said her first draft was too long, and she shortened it, but the ending was inconclusive. She had Marlowe shooting Terry Lennox. Altman made several changes to the script, like having Roger Wade commit suicide and having Marty Augustine smash a Coke bottle across his girlfriend's face. Altman said, "it was supposed to get the attention of the audience and remind them that, in spite of Marlowe, there is a real world out there, and it is a violent world". "Chandler fans will hate my guts", Altman said. "I don't give a damn."

== Production ==
=== Casting ===
Many of the film's roles were unconventionally cast. Jim Bouton was not an actor; he was a former Major League Baseball pitcher and the author of the bestselling book Ball Four. Nina van Pallandt was best known at the time as the ex-lover of writer Clifford Irving, who had written a fake autobiography of Howard Hughes that turned into a major scandal. Mark Rydell had an acting background, but was better known as the director of films like The Cowboys and The Reivers. Henry Gibson, who was then best known for his work in the comedy ensemble of Rowan and Martin's Laugh-In, was cast as Dr. Verringer.

In May 1972, it was announced that Dan Blocker would appear. He was cast as Roger Wade but died before filming started. The film is dedicated to his memory in the closing credits. In June Vilmos Zsigmond was confirmed as cinematographer.

Near the end of the film, during a scene in which Marlowe meets with Marty Augustine, Augustine orders everyone to strip and Arnold Schwarzenegger appears in briefs in a non-speaking role as a thug working for Augustine; Schwarzenegger did not receive screen credit for this appearance.

=== Filming ===
Altman did not read all of Chandler's book and instead used Raymond Chandler Speaking, a collection of letters and essays, copies of which he gave the cast and crew, advising them to study the essays. The opening scene with Marlowe and his cat came from a story a friend of Altman's told him about his cat only eating one type of cat food. Altman saw it as a comment on friendship. He decided that the camera should never stop moving and put it on a dolly. The camera movements counter the characters' actions so that the viewer feels like a voyeur. To compensate for Southern California's harsh light, Altman gave the film a soft pastel look reminiscent of postcards from the 1940s.

Altman had Gould and Hayden ad lib most of their dialogue because, according to the director, Hayden was drunk and stoned on marijuana most of the time. Altman was reportedly thrilled by Hayden's performance. Altman's home in Malibu Colony was used as Wade's house. "I hope it works", Altman said during filming. "We've got a script but we don't follow it closely."

As a reference to the American iconography of Chandler's novels, Marlowe wears a tie with American flags on it (the tie looks plain red in the movie due to Zsigmond's post-flashing).

== Music ==
The soundtrack of The Long Goodbye features two songs, "Hooray for Hollywood" and "The Long Goodbye", composed by John Williams and Johnny Mercer. It was Altman's idea to have every occurrence of the latter song arranged differently, from hippie chant to supermarket muzak to radio music, setting the mood for Marlowe's encounters with eccentric Californians while pursuing his case.

== Release ==
The Long Goodbye was previewed at the Tarrytown Conference Center in Tarrytown, New York. Judith Crist, then the film critic for New York magazine, hosted the gala. The film was not well received by the audience, except for Nina van Pallandt's performance. Altman attended a question-and-answer session afterward, where the mood was "vaguely hostile", reportedly leaving the director "depressed". The Long Goodbye was not well received by critics during its limited release in Los Angeles, Chicago, Philadelphia, and Miami. The New York opening was canceled at the last minute after several advance screenings had already been held for the press. The film was abruptly withdrawn from release with rumors that it would be reedited.

Studio executives analyzed the reviews for months, concluding that the reason for the film's failure was the misleading advertising campaign in which it had been promoted as a "detective story". They spent $40,000 on a new release campaign that included a poster by Mad magazine artist Jack Davis; the new poster contained caricatures and comic book word balloons to underline the film as a satire. When the film screened on TV in 1977, ABC cut Marlowe's shooting of Lennox.

MGM Home Entertainment released the film on DVD on September 17, 2002. Varèse Sarabande released selections from Williams's score on a CD in 2004 paired with the album rerecording of Williams's music from Fitzwilly; in 2015 Quartet Records issued a CD entirely devoted to The Long Goodbye.

== Reception ==
=== Critical response ===
Contemporaneous reviews complained of Altman's handling of the noir genre and Gould's portrayal of Marlowe. Time magazine's Jay Cocks wrote, "Altman's lazy, haphazard putdown is without affection or understanding, a nose-thumb not only at the idea of Philip Marlowe but at the genre that his tough-guy-soft-heart character epitomized. It is a curious spectacle to see Altman mocking a level of achievement to which, at his best, he could only aspire". Charles Champlin of the Los Angeles Times found the film "quite sleek, marvelously and inventively photographed ... The problem is that the Altman-Brackett Marlowe, played by Elliott Gould, is an untidy, unshaven, semiliterate, dim-wit slob who could not locate a missing skyscraper and would be refused service at a hot dog stand. He is not Chandler's Marlowe, or mine, and I can't find him interesting, sympathetic or amusing, and I can't be sure who will." Gary Arnold of The Washington Post wrote that the film "is not a movie version of the Chandler mystery that anyone with a liking for Chandler could possibly enjoy ... If you are not prepared to shuffle along from scene to pointless, protracted scene with klutzy old Elliott, there will be little to occupy your time or offset your annoyance."

Roger Ebert gave the film three out of four stars and praised Gould's performance, "particularly the virtuoso ten-minute stretch at the beginning of the movie when he goes out to buy food for his cat. Gould has enough of the paranoid in his acting style to really put over Altman's revised view of the private eye". Gene Siskel also liked the film and gave it three-and-a-half out of four stars, calling it "a most satisfying motion picture" with Gould displaying "surprising finesse and reserve" in his performance, though he faulted the "convoluted and too quickly resolved plot".

When The Long Goodbye was rereleased, reviewer Vincent Canby wrote, "it's an original work, complex without being obscure, visually breathtaking without seeming to be inappropriately fancy". Pauline Kael's review in The New Yorker said the film was "comic and melancholy" and called the film "a high-flying rap on Chandler and the movies", hailed Gould's performance as "his best yet", and praised Altman for achieving "a self-mocking fairy-tale poetry".

Despite her effusive endorsement and its influence on younger critics, The Long Goodbye was relatively unpopular and did poorly at the box office in the rest of the U.S. The New York Times included it on its Ten Best List for film that year and Zsigmond was awarded the National Society of Film Critics' prize for Best Cinematographer. Ebert later ranked it among his Great Movies collection, writing, "Most of its effect comes from the way it pushes against the genre, and the way Altman undermines the premise of all private eye movies, which is that the hero can walk down mean streets, see clearly, and tell right from wrong".

On Rotten Tomatoes, the film has an approval rating of 93% based on 58 reviews. The site's critical consensus reads, "An ice-cold noir that retains Robert Altman's idiosyncratic sensibilities, The Long Goodbye ranks among the smartest and most satisfying Marlowe mysteries." On Metacritic, the film has a score of 87 out of 100, based on 17 critics, indicating "universal acclaim".

=== Accolades ===
Institution	Year	Category	Nominee	Result
National Society of Film Critics	1973	Best Cinematography	Vilmos Zsigmond	Won
San Sebastián International Film Festival	1973	Golden Shell	Robert Altman	Lost to Terrence Malick for Badlands

== Japanese remake ==
The Long Goodbye was loosely remade as Yokohama BJ Blues, directed by Eiichi Kudo.

== Proposed sequel ==
After the film's release, Gould said, "originally, Bob and I had talked about doing a series, another Chandler/Marlowe story every other year, all set in the present", but this never came to pass.

The two later envisioned a sequel called It's Always Now that would center on an old, arthritic Marlowe with Gould set to reprise the role. Though he did not initially specify which Chandler story would be used, Gould said it was "obscure", written before The Big Sleep, and did not involve Marlowe specifically—though Chandler's estate had granted permission to use the character. He completed a synopsis, and continued to work on it with Altman until the director's death in 2006. Alan Rudolph then wrote the first draft of a script, and for a time was attached to direct it. In 2008, The New York Times reported that It's Always Now was based on Chandler's short story "The Curtain", first published in the September 1936 issue of Black Mask magazine. The story features a young boy as the murder suspect.

In a March 2012 interview, Gould described his continued efforts to realize the film, saying, "I'm still trying to make the sequel to The Long Goodbye but I can't find a nickel to make it!" He added, "I'd like to do it in a way we've never seen the character of Marlowe before. The values don't age." During a Long Goodbye post-screening Q&A the next month, he said the location of Marlowe's Hollywood Heights apartment still existed and could appear in the sequel, but said he doubted it would be made. By 2019, Gould had asked Steven Soderbergh to direct the sequel.

== See also ==
- List of American films of 1973
- List of cult films
- Robert Altman filmography
