= Robert Grossbach =

American writer and engineer (born 1941)

- Born: 1941 (age 84–85)
- Occupations: Writer; engineer

Robert Grossbach (born 1941) is an American writer and engineer. He has written four novels, including Easy and Hard Ways Out. He has also penned many novelizations of Neil Simon screenplays, as well as the novelization of Going in Style.

The 1984 movie Best Defense, starring Dudley Moore, is loosely based on Easy and Hard Ways Out. Robert Altman considered directing an adaptation of the novel in 1976, from a screenplay by Alan Rudolph. The director and screenwriter also tried to film an adaptation of A Shortage of Engineers, in 2002, before Altman moved on to The Company.

Grossbach's novels have received strong reviews. The New York Times wrote that "as a stylist, Grossbach is in a league with Wallace Markfield, Mordecai Richter and Bruce Jay Friedman."

He has contributed short stories to The Magazine of Fantasy & Science Fiction and Transatlantic Review. Grossbach has taught at NYU and UCLA Extension.

== Novels ==
- Someone Great (1971)
- Easy and Hard Ways Out (1974)
- Never Say Die: An Autonecrographical Novel (1979)
- A Shortage of Engineers (2001)

== Novelizations ==
- The Cheap Detective (1978)
- The Goodbye Girl (1978)
- "...And Justice for All" (1979)
- California Suite (1979)
- The Frisco Kid (1979)
- Going in Style (1979)
- Chapter Two (1980)
- The Devil and Max Devlin (1980)
- Four Friends (1981)
- Georgia (1982)
