= Robert Altman =

American filmmaker (1925–2006)

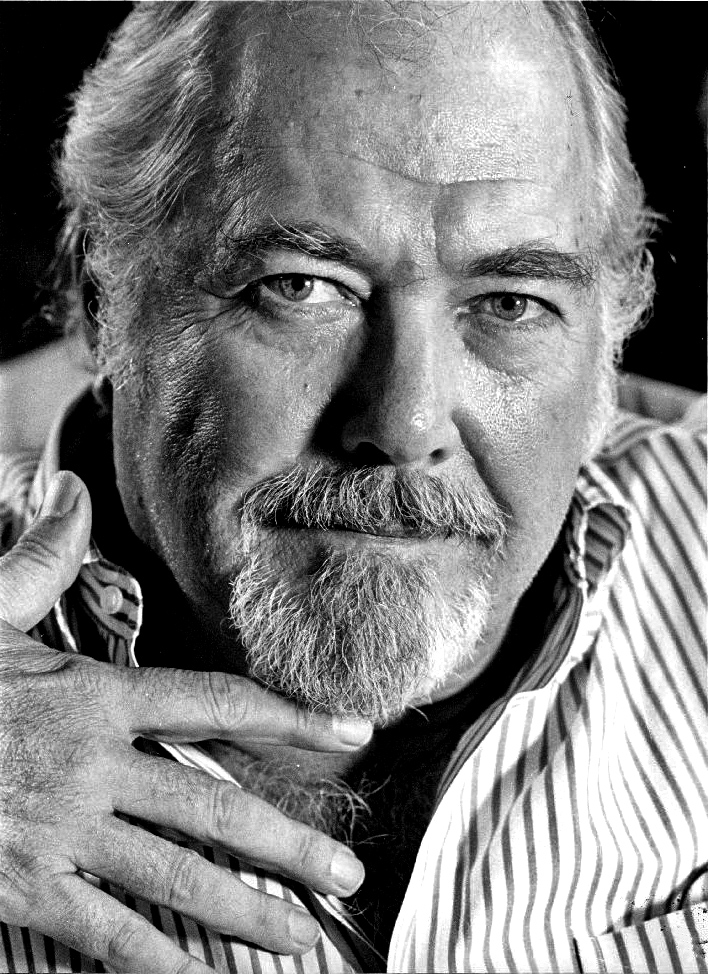
- Altman in 1983
- Born: Robert Bernard Altman; February 20, 1925; Kansas City, Missouri, U.S.
- Died: November 20, 2006 (aged 81); Los Angeles, California, U.S.
- Occupations: Film director; screenwriter; film producer
- Years active: 1947–2006
- Works: Full list
- Spouses: LaVonne Elmer (m. 1946–1951) Lotus Corelli (m. 1954–1957) Kathryn Reed (m. 1959)
- Children: 6, including Stephen and Robert Reed
- Military career
- Allegiance: United States
- Branch: United States Army Air Forces
- Service years: 1943–1947
- Rank: First lieutenant
- Units: Thirteenth Air Force; 307th Bombardment Group
- Conflicts: World War II; Asiatic-Pacific Theater
- Awards: Army Air Force Pilot Badge; Air Force Presidential Unit Citation; American Campaign Medal; Asiatic–Pacific Campaign Medal; World War II Victory Medal; Philippine Presidential Unit Citation

Robert Bernard Altman (/ˈɔːltmən/ AWLT-mən; February 20, 1925 – November 20, 2006) was an American filmmaker. He is considered an enduring figure from the New Hollywood era, known for directing subversive and satirical films with overlapping dialogue and ensemble casts. Over his career he received numerous accolades, including an Academy Honorary Award, two BAFTAs, three Independent Spirit Awards, a Primetime Emmy Award, a David di Donatello Award, and a Golden Globe, as well as nominations for seven competitive Academy Awards.

Altman was nominated for five Academy Awards for Best Director for the war comedy M*A*S*H (1970), the musical film Nashville (1975), the Hollywood satire The Player (1992), the dark comedy Short Cuts (1993), and the murder mystery Gosford Park (2001). He is also known for directing Brewster McCloud (1970), McCabe & Mrs. Miller (1971), The Long Goodbye (1973), California Split (1974), Thieves Like Us (1974), 3 Women (1977), A Wedding (1978), Popeye (1980), Secret Honor (1984), The Company (2003), and A Prairie Home Companion (2006).

Also known for his work on television, he directed the HBO political mockumentary miniseries Tanner '88 (1988) for which he won the Primetime Emmy Award for Outstanding Directing for a Drama Series. He also directed the HBO television film The Laundromat (1985). On stage, he directed the Broadway revival of the Ed Graczyk play Come Back to the 5 & Dime, Jimmy Dean, Jimmy Dean (1981) and later the 1982 film of the same name. He directed the West End revival of Arthur Miller's penultimate play Resurrection Blues (2006).

In 2006, the Academy of Motion Picture Arts and Sciences recognized Altman's body of work with an Academy Honorary Award. He died that same year at the age of 81. Despite seven nominations, Altman never won a competitive Academy Award. His films M*A*S*H, McCabe & Mrs. Miller, The Long Goodbye and Nashville have been selected for the United States National Film Registry. Altman is also one of five filmmakers whose films have won the Golden Bear at Berlin, the Golden Lion at Venice, and the Palme d'Or at Cannes (the other four being Henri-Georges Clouzot, Michelangelo Antonioni, Jean-Luc Godard and Jafar Panahi).

== Early life ==
Altman was born on February 20, 1925, in Kansas City, Missouri, the son of Helen (née Matthews), a Mayflower descendant from Nebraska, and Bernard Clement Altman, a wealthy insurance salesman and amateur gambler who came from an upper-class family. Altman's ancestry was German, English and Irish; his paternal grandfather, Frank Altman Sr., anglicized the spelling of the family name from "Altmann" to "Altman". Altman had a Catholic upbringing, but he did not continue to follow or practice the religion as an adult, although he has been referred to as "a sort of Catholic" and a Catholic director. He was educated at Jesuit schools, including Rockhurst High School, in Kansas City. He graduated from Wentworth Military Academy in Lexington, Missouri in 1943.

Soon after graduation, Altman joined the United States Army Air Forces at the age of 18. During World War II, he flew more than 50 bombing missions as a co-pilot of a B-24 Liberator with the 307th Bomb Group in Borneo and the Dutch East Indies. Upon his discharge in 1947 he moved to California. He worked in publicity for a company that had invented a tattooing machine to identify dogs. He entered filmmaking on a whim, selling a script to RKO for the 1948 picture Bodyguard, which he co-wrote with George W. George. Altman's immediate success encouraged him to move to New York City, where he attempted to forge a career as a writer. Having enjoyed little success, he returned to Kansas City in 1949 and accepted a job as a director and writer of industrial films for the Calvin Company. He directed some 65 industrial films and documentaries for the Calvin Company. Through his early work on industrial films, he experimented with narrative technique and developed his characteristic use of overlapping dialogue. In February 2012, an early Calvin film directed by Altman, Modern Football (1951), was found by filmmaker Gary Huggins.

Altman also had a career directing plays and operas parallel to his film career. While he was employed by the Calvin Company he began directing plays at the Resident Theatre of the Jewish Community Center. These plays allowed him to work with local actors, such as fellow future director Richard C. Sarafian, whom he directed in a production of Richard Harrity's Hope Is the Thing with Feathers. Sarafian would later marry Altman's sister and follow him to Hollywood.

== Career ==
=== 1957–1969: Directorial debut and early work ===
Altman's first forays into television directing were on the DuMont drama series Pulse of the City (1953–1954), and an episode of the 1956 western series The Sheriff of Cochise. In 1956, he was hired by a local businessman to write and direct a feature film in Kansas City on juvenile delinquency. The film, titled The Delinquents, made for $60,000, was purchased by United Artists for $150,000, and released in 1957. While primitive, this teen exploitation film contained the foundations of Altman's later work in its use of casual, naturalistic dialogue. With its success, Altman moved from Kansas City to California for the last time. He co-directed The James Dean Story (1957), a documentary rushed into theaters to capitalize on the actor's recent death and marketed to his emerging cult following. Both works caught the attention of Alfred Hitchcock who hired Altman as a director for his CBS anthology series Alfred Hitchcock Presents. After just two episodes, Altman resigned due to differences with a producer, but this exposure enabled him to forge a successful television career. Over the next decade Altman worked prolifically in television (and almost exclusively in series dramas) directing multiple episodes of Whirlybirds, The Millionaire, U.S. Marshal, The Troubleshooters, The Roaring 20s, Bonanza, Bus Stop, Kraft Mystery Theater, Combat!, as well as single episodes of several other notable series including Hawaiian Eye, Maverick (the fourth season episode "Bolt From the Blue" also written by Altman and starring Roger Moore), Lawman, Surfside 6, Peter Gunn, and Route 66.

By the 1960s, Altman had established himself as a television director due to his ability to work quickly and efficiently on a limited budget. Though he was frequently fired from television projects for refusing to conform to network mandates, Altman always was able to land new assignments. In 1964, the producers decided to expand "Once Upon a Savage Night", one of his episodes of Kraft Suspense Theatre, for release as a television film under the title Nightmare in Chicago. In a 1963 episode, "The Hunt", his cast included James Caan and Bruce Dern.

Two years later, Altman was hired to direct the low-budget space travel feature Countdown, but was fired within days of the project's conclusion because he had refused to edit the film to a manageable length. He worked with Caan again, who led the cast with Robert Duvall. He did not direct another film until That Cold Day in the Park (1969), which was a critical and box-office disaster. During the decade, Altman began to express political subtexts within his works. In particular he expressed anti-war sentiments regarding the Vietnam War. Because of this, Altman's career would somewhat suffer as he came to be associated with the anti-war movement.

=== 1970–1979: Breakthrough and stardom ===
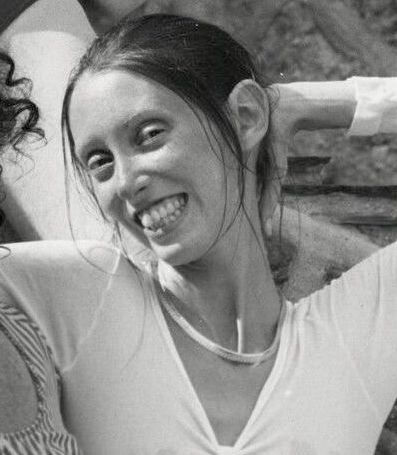
Shelley Duvall was a muse of Altman's, acting in seven of his films including Brewster McCloud (1970), Nashville (1975), 3 Women (1977), and Popeye (1980)

In 1969 Altman was offered the script for M*A*S*H, an adaptation of a little-known Korean War-era novel satirizing life in the armed services; more than a dozen other filmmakers had passed on it. Altman had been hesitant to take the production, and the shoot was so tumultuous that Elliott Gould and Donald Sutherland tried to have Altman fired over his unorthodox filming methods. Nevertheless, M*A*S*H was widely hailed as a classic upon its 1970 release. It won the Palme d'Or at the 1970 Cannes Film Festival and netted five Academy Award nominations. It was Altman's highest-grossing film, released during a time of increasing anti-war sentiment in the United States. The Academy Film Archive preserved M*A*S*H in 2000.

Now recognized as a major talent, Altman notched critical successes with McCabe & Mrs. Miller (1971), a revisionist Western in which the mordant songs of Leonard Cohen underscore a gritty vision of the American frontier; Images, his single, Bergman-inspired attempt at making a horror film; The Long Goodbye (1973), a controversial adaptation of the Raymond Chandler novel (scripted by Leigh Brackett) now ranked as a seminal influence on the neo-noir subgenre; Thieves Like Us (1974), an adaptation of the Edward Anderson novel previously filmed by Nicholas Ray as They Live by Night (1949); California Split (1974), a gambling comedy-drama shot partially on location in Reno, Nevada; and Nashville (1975), which had a strong political theme set against the world of country music. The stars of the film wrote their own songs; Keith Carradine won an Academy Award for the song "I'm Easy". Altman's next film, Buffalo Bill and the Indians, or Sitting Bull's History Lesson, won the Golden Bear at the 28th Berlin International Film Festival.

Although his films were often met with divisive notices, and some, like A Perfect Couple and Quintet were widely panned, many of the prominent film critics of the era (including Pauline Kael, Vincent Canby and Roger Ebert) remained steadfastly loyal to his directorial style throughout the decade. Audiences took some time to appreciate his films, and he did not want to have to satisfy studio officials. In 1970, following the release of M*A*S*H, he founded Lion's Gate Films to have independent production freedom. Altman's company is not to be confused with the current Lionsgate, a Canada/U.S. entertainment company. The films he made through his company included Brewster McCloud, A Wedding, and 3 Women.

=== 1980–1991: Career fluctuations ===
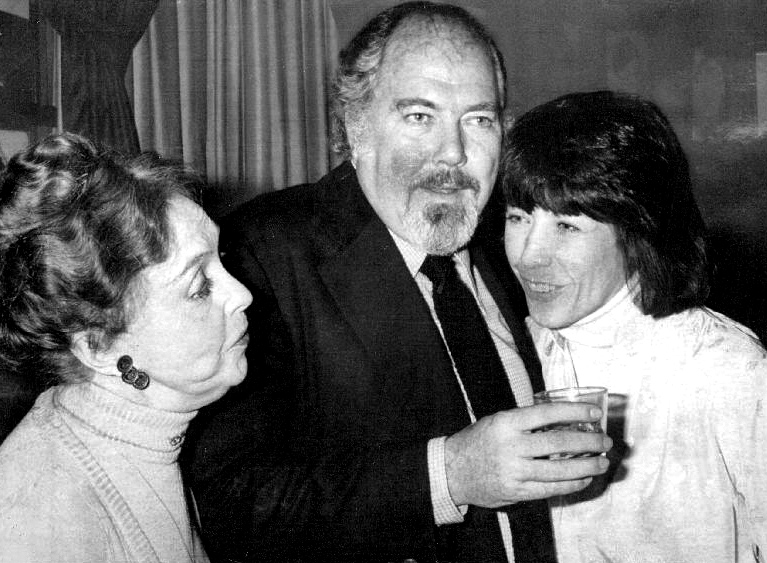
Altman with Lillian Gish and Lily Tomlin at Nashville awards ceremony in 1976

In 1980, he directed the musical film Popeye. Produced by Robert Evans and written by Jules Feiffer, the film was based on the comic strip / cartoon of the same name and starred Shelley Duvall and the comedian Robin Williams in his film debut. Gilda Radner was also considered for the lead female role; her manager, Bernie Brillstein, discouraged her from taking the role, in part due to his worries of her working for months on an isolated set with Altman, known for his erratic behavior and unorthodox creative methods. Designed as a vehicle to increase Altman's commercial clout following a series of critically acclaimed but commercially unsuccessful low-budget films in the late 1970s (including 3 Women, A Wedding, and Quintet), Popeye was filmed on location in Malta. It was soon beleaguered by heavy drug and alcohol use among most of the cast and crew, including the director; Altman reportedly clashed with Evans, Williams (who threatened to leave the film), and songwriter Harry Nilsson (who departed midway through the shoot, leaving Van Dyke Parks to finish the orchestrations). Although the film grossed $60 million worldwide on a $20 million budget and was the second highest-grossing film Altman had directed to that point, it failed to meet studio expectations and was considered a box office disappointment.

In 1981 the director sold Lion's Gate to producer Jonathan Taplin after his political satire Health (shot in early 1979 for a Christmas release) was shelved by longtime distributor 20th Century Fox following tepid test and festival screenings throughout 1980. The departure of longtime Altman partisan Alan Ladd Jr. from Fox also played a decisive role in forestalling the release of the film.

Unable to secure major financing in the post-New Hollywood blockbuster era because of his mercurial reputation and the particularly tumultuous events surrounding the production of Popeye, Altman returned to television and theater between films. His first project after Popeye was 2 by South, a double bill of plays by unknown playwright Frank South, Rattlesnake in a Cooler and Precious Blood. The production debuted in Los Angeles and transferred off-Broadway, before Altman adapted it as a pair of television films. Altman's next project was to revive Ed Graczyk's play, Come Back to the 5 & Dime, Jimmy Dean, Jimmy Dean. Like 2 by South, Altman adapted his production as a film. The film, which starred Cher, Karen Black, and Sandy Dennis, played at film festivals before its independent theatrical release; Altman turned down several distribution deals to keep the film under his control.

In 1982, after finishing work on Come Back to the Five and Dime, Jimmy Dean, Jimmy Dean, Altman travelled to Dallas to film his next film, Streamers. The film, adapted by David Rabe from his hit play, was shot in only 18 days. Its 1983 release made it Altman's third theatrical adaptation in as many years. Afterwards, he began teaching a course on his films at the University of Michigan, where he concurrently staged his first production of Igor Stravinsky's The Rake's Progress. He also co-wrote John Anderson's 1983 hit single "Black Sheep".

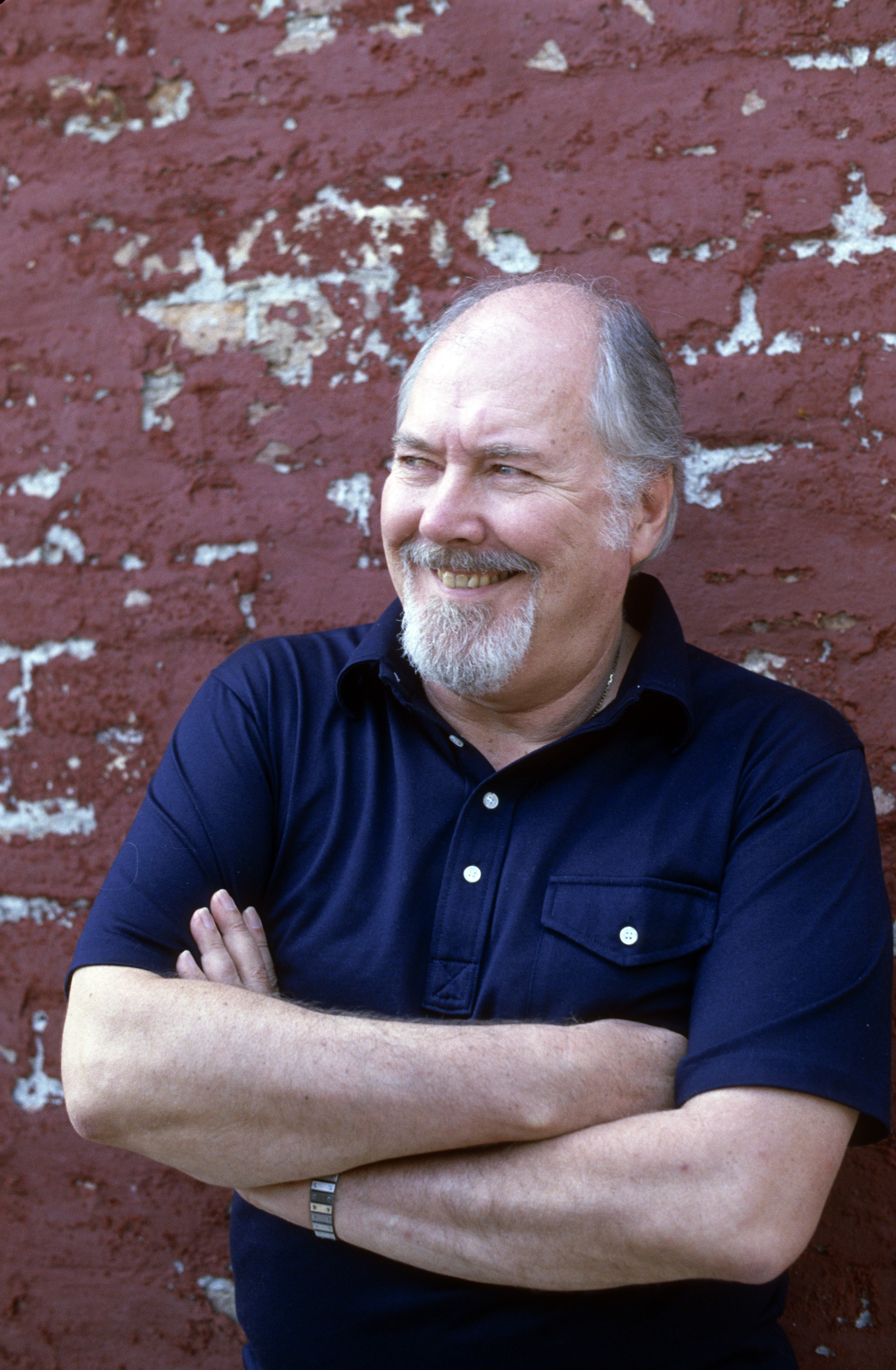
Altman in 1980

After the critical success of his three successive theatrical adaptations, Altman attempted to return to Hollywood with the teen comedy O.C. and Stiggs (1985). Like Popeye, the chaotic production was characterized by tension between Altman and the studio, MGM. Altman travelled to Arizona to shoot away from the executives and the screenwriters, whom he banned from the set. There he shot the film in the summer of 1983, but poor test screenings, chaos within the studio, and changing ownership delayed the film's release. It finally received a belated limited commercial release in 1987, four years after it was shot. The British Film Institute later referred to it as "probably Altman's least successful film".

While O.C. and Stiggs was shelved, Altman returned to theatrical adaptations and to the University of Michigan to film Secret Honor, using his students as crew members. Based on a one man-play about former president Richard Nixon, the film starred Philip Baker Hall as the ex-president. In 2008, the University of Michigan Library acquired Altman's archive. Adapted by Altman and Sam Shepard for The Cannon Group from Shepard's Pulitzer Prize-nominated play, Fool for Love (1985) featured the playwright-actor alongside Kim Basinger, Harry Dean Stanton, and Randy Quaid; it fared better than most of his films from the era, earning $900,000 domestically on a $2 million budget and positive reviews from Roger Ebert and Vincent Canby.

Disappointed by his string of critical and commercial failures, including the still-unreleased O.C. and Stiggs, Altman moved to Paris. There, he shot another television film, The Laundromat, which he completed before Fool for Love. He then wrote and directed Beyond Therapy, which proved to be one of his biggest failures. Altman then mounted his second production of The Rake's Progress, this time at the prestigious Opéra de Lille. The Opéra was undergoing financial collapse at the time, and its failure to regain money through ambitious productions caused it close later that year. Altman also used a selection from Jean-Phillipe Rameau's Les Boréades as the basis for his contribution to Aria, which was shown at the 1987 Cannes Film Festival to mixed reception. Altman made his next television film, Basements, based on two plays by Harold Pinter. Though Pinter wrote the screenplay himself, this film became the latest of Altman's failures. The long-awaited release of O.C. and Stiggs that year was also panned.

Altman finally regained a modicum of critical favor in 1988 for his television work. He returned to America early that year to shoot the mockumentary show Tanner '88 (1988), a collaboration with Garry Trudeau set in the milieu of a United States presidential campaign, for which he earned a Primetime Emmy Award. The series was shot on the actual campaign trail and featured several real candidates. During the show's run, Altman's television production of The Caine Mutiny Court-Martial aired. Though it received high acclaim, it would be his last television film. In 1990, Altman directed Vincent & Theo, a biographical film about Vincent van Gogh that was intended as a television miniseries for broadcast in the United Kingdom. A theatrical version of the film was a modest success in the United States, marking a significant turning point in the director's critical resurgence. (Note: Powerfully realized study of Vincent van Gogh and his brother Theo marks a return to the mainstream arena for director Robert Altman. Brilliantly acted, splendid film fare should be welcomed in specialty houses and beyond.) (Note: When The Player came out in 1992, it was greeted as a welcome comeback for director Robert Altman, who spent much of the previous decade working small—making filmed plays instead of the ambitious, character-heavy genre reinventions he'd been known for in the 1970s. But Altman actually reclaimed his "critics' darling" status two years earlier with Vincent & Theo, a luminous biopic about painter Vincent Van Gogh (played by Tim Roth) and his art-dealer brother (Paul Rhys).)

=== 1992–2006: Career resurgence and final films ===
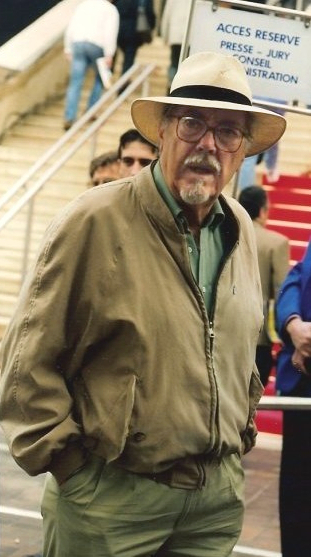
Altman at the 1992 Cannes Film Festival

He revitalized his career in earnest with The Player (1992), a satire of Hollywood. Co-produced by the influential David Brown (The Sting, Jaws, Cocoon), the film was nominated for three Academy Awards, including Best Director. While he did not win the Oscar, he was awarded Best Director by the Cannes Film Festival, BAFTA, and the New York Film Critics Circle.

Altman then directed Short Cuts (1993), an ambitious adaptation of several short stories by Raymond Carver, which portrayed the lives of various citizens of Los Angeles over the course of several days. The film's large cast and intertwining of many different storylines were similar to his large-cast films of the 1970s; he won the Golden Lion at the 1993 Venice International Film Festival and another Oscar nomination for Best Director.

Between shooting and editing Short Cuts, Altman made his return to opera as the director and co-librettist of McTeague. Altman was hired on the project by William Bolcom, who had been commissioned with his regular librettist, Arnold Weinstein, to write an opera by the Lyric Opera of Chicago. Bolcom, a teacher at the University of Michigan, had admired Altman's first production of The Rake's Progress a decade prior and asked him for help adapting Frank Norris's novel. After finishing Short Cuts, Altman directed two episodes of Great Performances. The first was an R&B revue; the second was a television adaptation of McTeague.

The rest of the 1990s saw limited success for Altman. His 1994 release Prêt-à-Porter (also known as Ready to Wear) garnered significant pre-release publicity, but was a commercial and critical flop, though it got several nominations for year-end awards, including two Golden Globe nominations and won the National Board of Review award for Best Acting By An Ensemble. In 1996, Altman directed Kansas City, expressing his love of 1930s jazz through a complicated kidnapping story. Altman encouraged the film's on-set musicians to improvise, and unused footage of their performances formed the basis for Altman's third episode of Great Performances. The film received lukewarm-to-positive reviews, but made next to nothing at the box office, as did the 1998 legal thriller The Gingerbread Man. Though his 1997 anthology series Gun had a high-profile cast, it was cancelled after only six episodes.

He did close the decade on a high note, with 1999's Cookie's Fortune, a quirky black comedy about the suicide of a wealthy dowager, his first film in almost 6 years to make back its budget, and which earned him generally positive praise from critics. He was elected a Fellow of the American Academy of Arts and Sciences in 1999. Though Altman's first film of the new millennium, Dr. T & the Women, received only moderate reviews and middling financial success. His next film, Gosford Park (2001), was included on many critics' lists of the ten best films of that year. A large-cast, British country house murder mystery, it won the Academy Award for Best Original Screenplay (Julian Fellowes) plus six more nominations, including two for Altman, as Best Director and Best Picture.

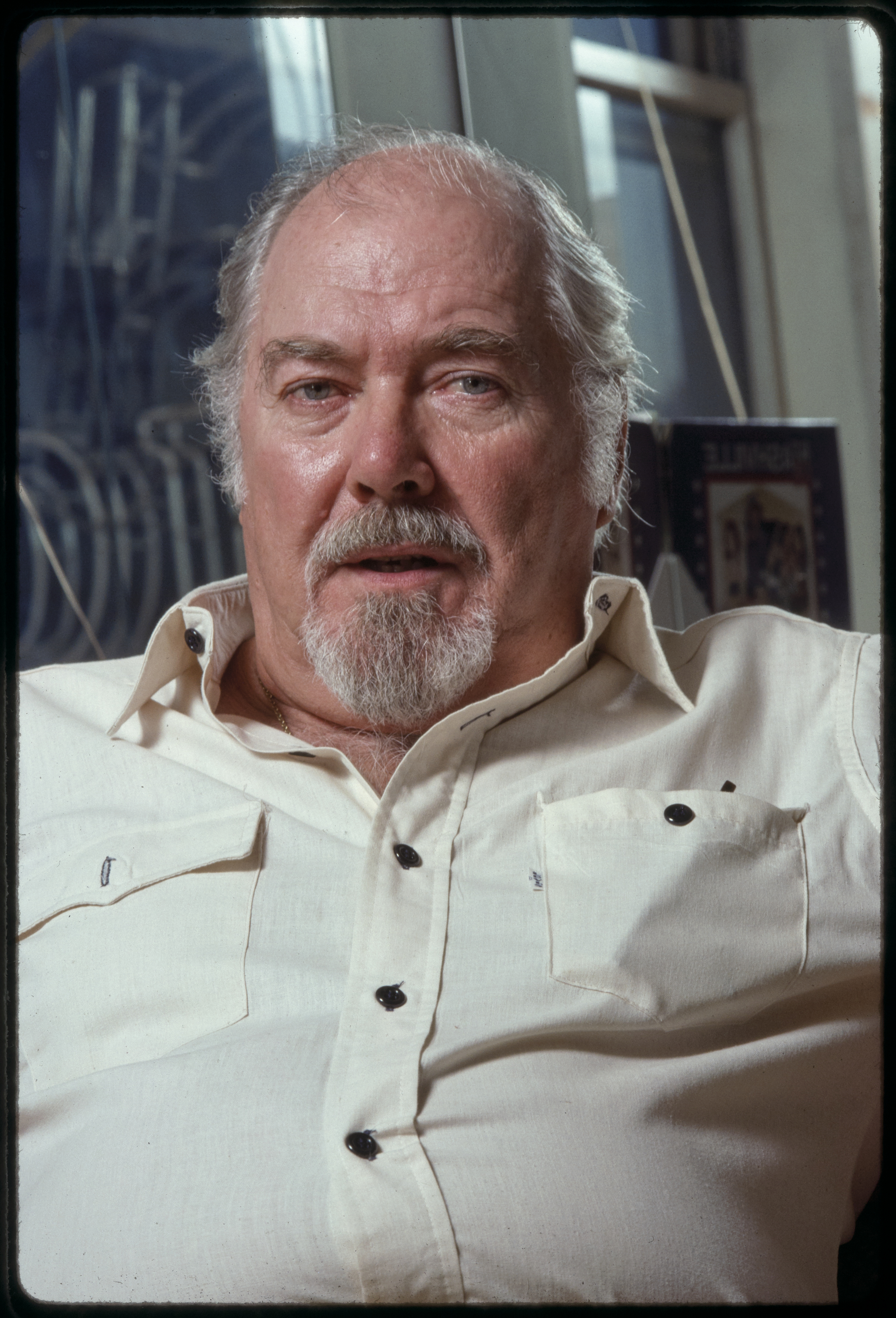
Altman in 1980

Altman returned to the stage twice more. In 2004 He reunited with Bolcom, Weinstein, and the Lyric Opera to adapt his 1978 film, A Wedding, as an opera. It was generally well received. His final stage production was poorly received. In 2006, Altman travelled to England to direct the West End debut of Arthur Miller's final play, Resurrection Blues at the Old Vic Theatre. At this time, the Old Vic was managed by Kevin Spacey, and the production starred Maximilian Schell, James Fox, Neve Campbell, Matthew Modine, and Jane Adams. However, despite the pedigree of all involved, the production was an abject failure with poor reviews and behind-the-scenes bickering.

Working with independent studios such as the now-shuttered Fine Line, Artisan (which was absorbed into today's Lionsgate), and USA Films (now Focus Features), gave Altman the edge in making the kinds of films he always wanted to make without studio interference. The Company, a film about the Joffrey Ballet in Chicago, featured a cast composed mainly of actual dancers. The film had been conceived by star Neve Campbell, an ex ballerina, and written by Altman's longtime friend, Barbara Turner. Altman directed a follow-up to Tanner '88 for the Sundance Channel, reuniting him with Michael Murphy as an older Jack Tanner. A film version of Garrison Keillor's public radio series A Prairie Home Companion was released in June 2006. Altman was still developing new projects up until his death, including a film based on Hands on a Hard Body: The Documentary (1997).

In 2006, the Academy of Motion Picture Arts and Sciences awarded Altman an Academy Honorary Award for Lifetime Achievement. During his acceptance speech he revealed that he had received a heart transplant approximately ten or eleven years earlier. The director then quipped that perhaps the academy had acted prematurely in recognizing the body of his work, as he felt like he might have four more decades of life ahead of him.

== Directing style and technique ==
Altman's particular style of filmmaking covered many genres — referred to as Altmanesque — but usually with a "subversive" or "anti-Hollywood" twist which typically relied on satire and humor to express his personal views. Actors especially enjoyed working under his direction because he encouraged them to improvise. He preferred large ensemble casts for his films, and developed a multitrack recording technique which produced overlapping dialogue from multiple actors. This produced a more natural, more dynamic, and more complex experience for the viewer. He also used highly mobile camera work and zoom lenses to enhance the activity taking place on the screen. Critic Pauline Kael, writing about his directing style, said that Altman could "make film fireworks out of next to nothing" and calls his method for making movies as "a step toward a new kind of movie naturalism."

=== Maverick and auteur ===
Following his successful career in television, Altman began his new career in the film industry when he was in middle-age. He understood the creative limits imposed by the television medium, and now set out to direct and write films which would express his personal visions about American society and Hollywood. His films would later be described as "auteuristic attacks" and "idiosyncratic variations" of traditional films, typically using subtle comedy or satire as a way of expressing his observations.

His films were typically related to political, ideological, and personal subjects, and Altman was known for "refusing to compromise his own artistic vision." He has been described as "anti-Hollywood," often ignoring the social pressures that affected others in the industry, which made it more difficult for him to get many of his films seen. He said his independence as a filmmaker helped him overall:

I don't think there's a filmmaker alive, or who ever lived, who's had a better shake than I've had. I've never been without a project and it's always been a project of my own choosing. So I don't know how much better it could be. I have not become a mogul, I don't build castles and I don't have a vast personal fortune, but I have been able to do what I've wanted to do and I've done it a lot.

"Altman was a genuine movie maverick," states author Ian Freer, because he went against the commercial conformity of the film industry: "He was the scourge of the film establishment, and his work generally cast an astute, scathing eye over the breadth of American culture, often exploding genres and character archetypes; Altman was fascinated by people with imperfections, people as they really are, not as the movies would have you believe." Director Alan Rudolph, during a special tribute to Altman, refers to his moviemaking style as "Altmanesque."

With his independent style of directing, he developed a bad reputation among screenwriters and those on the business side of films. He admits, "I have a bad reputation with writers, developed over the years: 'Oh, he doesn't do what you write, blah blah blah.' ... Ring Lardner was very pissed off with me," for not following his script. Nor did Altman get along well with studio heads, once punching an executive in the nose and knocking him into a swimming pool because he insisted he cut six minutes from a film he was working on.

His reputation among actors was better. With them, his independence sometimes extended to his choice of actors, often going against consensus. Cher, for instance, credits him for launching her career with both the stage play and film, Come Back to the Five and Dime, Jimmy Dean, Jimmy Dean (1982). "Without Bob I would have never had a film career. Everyone told him not to cast me. Everyone. ... Nobody would give me a break. I am convinced that Bob was the only one who was brave enough to do it." Others, like Julianne Moore, describes working with him:

You know, all this talk about Bob being this kind of irascible, difficult kind of person? Well, he was never that way with an actor or with a creative person that I saw. Never, never, never. He saved all that for the money people.

Director Robert Dornhelm said Altman "looked at film as a pure, artistic venue." With Short Cuts (1993), for instance, the distributor "begged him" to cut a few minutes from the length, to keep it commercially viable: "Bob just thought the antiChrist was trying to destroy his art. They were well-meaning people who wanted him to get what he deserved, which was a big commercial hit. But when it came down to the art or the money, he was with the art."

Sally Kellerman, noting Altman's willful attitude, looked back with regret at giving up a chance to act in one of his films:

I had just finished filming Last of the Red Hot Lovers when Bob called me one day at home. "Sally, do you want to be in my picture after next?" he asked. "Only if it's a good part," I said. He hung up on me. Bob was as stubborn and arrogant as I was at the time, but the sad thing is that I cheated myself out of working with someone I loved so much, someone who made acting both fun and easy and who trusted his actors. Bob loved actors. Stars would line up to work for nothing for Bob Altman.

=== Themes and subjects ===
Unlike directors whose work fits within various film genres, such as Westerns, musicals, war films, or comedies, Altman's work has been defined as more "anti-genre" by various critics. This is partly due to the satirical and comedy nature of many of his films. Geraldine Chaplin, daughter of Charlie Chaplin, compared the humor in his films to her father's films:

They're funny in the right way. Funny in a critical way — of what the world is and the world we live in. They were both geniuses in their way. They alter your experience of reality. They have their world and they have their humor. That humor is so rare.

Altman made it clear that he did not like "storytelling" in his films, contrary to the way most television and mainstream film are made. According to Altman biographer Mitchell Zuckoff, "he disliked the word 'story,' believing that a plot should be secondary to an exploration of pure (or, even better, impure) human behavior." Zuckoff describes the purposes underlying many of Altman's films: "He loved the chaotic nature of real life, with conflicting perspectives, surprising twists, unexplained actions, and ambiguous endings. He especially loved many voices, sometimes arguing, sometimes agreeing, ideally overlapping, a cocktail party or a street scene captured as he experienced it. Julianne Moore, after seeing some of his movies, credits Altman's style of directing for her decision to become a film actress, rather than a stage actress:

I felt it really strongly. And I thought, "I don't know who this guy is, but that's what I want to do. I want to do that kind of work." From then on I'd see his films whenever I could, and he was always my absolute favorite director, for what he said thematically and emotionally and how he felt about people.

Film author Charles Derry writes that Altman's films "characteristically contain perceptive observations, telling exchanges, and moments of crystal clear revelation of human folly." Because Altman was an astute observer of society and "especially interested in people," notes Derry, many of his film characters had "that sloppy imperfection associated with human beings as they are, with life as it is lived." As a result, his films are often an indirect critique of American society.

The satirical content is evident In many of Altman's films: M*A*S*H (1970), for example, is a satirical black comedy set during the Korean War; McCabe & Mrs. Miller (1971) is a satire on Westerns; author Matthew Kennedy states that Nashville (1975) is a "brilliant satire of America immediately prior to the Bicentennial"; A Wedding (1978) is a satire on American marriage rituals and hypocrisy; Altman himself said that The Player (1992) was "a very mild satire" about the Hollywood film industry, and Vincent Canby agreed, stating that "as a satire, The Player tickles. It doesn't draw blood." The satire of his films sometimes led to their failure at the box office if their satirical nature was not understood by the distributor. Altman blames the box office failure of The Long Goodbye (1973), a detective story, on the erroneous marketing of the film as a thriller:

When the picture opened, it was a big, big flop. ... I went to David Picker and said, "You can't do this. No wonder the fucking picture is failing. It's giving the wrong impression. You make it look like a thriller and it's not, it's a satire.

Similarly, Altman also blames the failure of O.C. & Stiggs on it being marketed as a typical "teenage movie," rather than what he filmed it as, a "satire of a teenage movie," he said.

=== Improvisation dialogue ===
Altman favored stories expressing the interrelationships among several characters, being more interested in character motivation than in intricate plots. He therefore tended to sketch out only a basic plot for the film, referring to the screenplay as a "blueprint" for action. By encouraging his actors to improvise dialogue, Altman thus became known as an "actor's director," a reputation that attracted many notable actors to work as part of his large casts. Performers enjoy working with Altman in part because "he provides them with the freedom to develop their characters and often alter the script through improvisation and collaboration," notes Derry. Richard Baskin says that "Bob was rather extraordinary in his way of letting people do what they did. He trusted you to do what you did and therefore you would kill for him."

Geraldine Chaplin, who acted in Nashville, recalls one of her first rehearsal sessions:

He said, "Have you brought your scripts?" We said yes. He said, "Well, throw them away. You don't need them. You need to know who you are and where you are and who you're with." ... It was like being onstage with a full house every second. All the circus acts you had inside your body you'd do just for him.

Altman regularly let his actors develop a character through improvisation during rehearsal or sometimes during the actual filming. Such improvisation was uncommon in film due to the high cost of film production which requires careful planning, precise scripts, and rehearsal, before costly film was exposed. Nevertheless, Altman preferred to use improvisation as a tool for helping his actors develop their character. Altman said that "once we start shooting it's a very set thing. Improvisation is misunderstood. We don't just turn people loose." Although he tried to avoid dictating an actor's every move, preferring to let them be in control:

When I cast a film, most of my creative work is done. I have to be there to turn the switch on and give them encouragement as a father figure, but they do all the work. ... All I'm trying to do is make it easy on the actor, because once you start to shoot, the actor is the artist. ... I have to give them confidence and see that they have a certain amount of protection so they can be creative. ... I let them do what they became actors for in the first place: to create.

Carol Burnett remembers Altman admitting that many of the ideas in his films came from the actors. "You never hear a director say that. That was truly an astonishing thing," she said. Others, such as Jennifer Jason Leigh, became creatively driven:

He would inspire you out of sheer necessity to come up with stuff that you didn't know you were capable of, that you didn't know you had in you. He was so genuinely mischievous and so damn funny.

Krin Gabbard adds that Altman enjoyed using actors "who flourish as improvisers," such as Elliott Gould, who starred in 5 of his films, including M*A*S*H, The Long Goodbye and California Split. Gould recalls that when filming M*A*S*H, his first acting job with Altman, he and costar Donald Sutherland didn't think Altman knew what he was doing. He wrote years later, "I think that in hindsight, Donald and I were two elitist, arrogant actors who really weren't getting Altman's genius." Others in the cast immediately appreciated Altman's directing style. René Auberjonois explains:

We thought that's the way movies were. That they were that joyous an experience. If you had any kind of career, you quickly saw that most directors don't really trust actors, don't really want to see actors acting. That was the difference with Bob Altman. He loved actors and wanted to see acting.

Unlike television and traditional films, Altman also avoided "conventional storytelling," and would opt for showing the "busy confusion of real life," observes Albert Lindauer. Among the various techniques to achieve this effect, his films often include "a profusion of sounds and images, by huge casts or crazy characters, multiple plots or no plots at all, ... and a reliance on improvisation." A few months before he died, Altman tried to summarize the motives behind his filmmaking style:

I equate this work more with painting than with theater or literature. Stories don't interest me. Basically, I'm more interested in behavior. I don't direct, I watch. I have to be thrilled if I expect the audience to be thrilled. Because what I really want to see from an actor is something I've never seen before, so I can't tell them what it is. I try to encourage actors not to take turns. To deal with conversation as conversation. I mean, that's what the job is, I think. It's to make a comfort area so that an actor can go beyond what he thought he could do.

=== Sound techniques ===
Altman was one of the few filmmakers who "paid full attention to the possibilities of sound" when filming. He tried to replicate natural conversational sounds, even with large casts, by wiring hidden microphones to actors, then recording them talking over each other with multiple soundtracks. During the filming, he wore a headset to ensure that important dialogue could be heard, without emphasizing it. This produced a "dense audio experience" for viewers, allowing them to hear multiple scraps of dialogue, as if they were listening in on various private conversations. Altman recognized that although large casts hurt a film commercially, "I like to see a lot of stuff going on."

Altman first used overlapping soundtracks in M*A*S*H (1970), a sound technique which film author Michael Barson describes as "a breathtaking innovation at the time." He developed it, Altman said, to force viewers to pay attention and become engaged in the film as if they were an active participant. According to some critics, one of the more extreme uses of the technique is in McCabe and Mrs. Miller (1971), also considered among his finest films.

Film historian/scholar Robert P. Kolker pointed out that the aural and visual simultaneity in Altman's films was critical as that represented an emphasis on the plurality of events, which required viewers to become active spectators.

=== Ensemble casts ===
Overlapping dialogue among large groups of actors adds complexity to Altman's films, and they were often criticized as appearing haphazard or disconnected on first viewing. Some of his critics changed their minds after seeing them again. British film critic David Thomson gave Nashville (1975) a bad review after watching it the first time, but later wrote, "But going back to Nashville and some of the earlier films, ... made me reflect: It remains enigmatic how organized or purposeful Nashville is. ... The mosaic, or mix, permits a freedom and a human idiosyncrasy that Renoir might have admired." During the making of the film, the actors were inspired, and co-star Ronee Blakley was convinced of the film's ultimate success:

Yes, I did think it was going to be great, all the work was so good, every actor was inspired, and Altman's team was intensely competent, and he was that rare kind of genius who knows what works and what doesn't at the moment it is happening.

Thomson later recognized those aspects as being part of Altman's style, beginning with M*A*S*H (1970): "MASH began to develop the crucial Altman style of overlapping, blurred sound and images so slippery with zoom that there was no sense of composition. That is what makes Nashville so absorbing." Altman explained that to him such overlapping dialogue in his films was closer to reality, especially with large groups: "If you've got fourteen people at a dinner table, it seems to me it's pretty unlikely that only two of them are going to be talking." Pauline Kael writes that Altman, "the master of large ensembles, loose action, and overlapping voices, demonstrates that ... he can make film fireworks out of next to nothing."

=== Photography ===
Altman's distinctive style of directing carried over into his preferences for camerawork. Among them was his use of widescreen compositions, intended to capture the many people or activities taking place on screen at the same time. For some films, such as McCabe and Mrs. Miller, he created a powerful visual atmosphere with cinematographer Vilmos Zsigmond, such as scenes using fluid camerawork, zoom lenses, and a smoky effect using special fog filters. Director Stanley Kubrick told Altman that "the camerawork was wonderful," and asked, "How did you do it?"

In Nashville, Altman used sets with noticeable colors of reds, whites and blues. For The Long Goodbye, he insisted that Zsigmond keep the camera mobile by mounting it to moving objects. Zsigmond states that Altman "wanted to do something different" in this film, and told him he "wanted the camera to move — all the time. Up. down. In and out. Side to side." Cinematographer Roger Deakins, discussing his use of zoom lenses, commented, "I would find it quite exciting to shoot a film with a zoom lens if it was that observational, roving kind of look that Robert Altman was known for. He'd put the camera on a jib arm and float across the scene and pick out these shots as he went along – quite a nice way of working."

Zsigmond also recalls that working with Altman was fun:

We rather enjoyed doing things "improv." Altman is a great improviser. During the first few days of the shoot, he would "create" different approaches on a moment's notice. He would show me how he wanted the camera to move — always move. Which was fun. The actors loved it, and I was always challenged to find ways to shoot what Altman came up with.

Vilmos Zsigmond's cinematography in McCabe and Mrs. Miller received a nomination by the British Academy Film Awards.

=== Music scores ===
When using music in his films, Altman was known to be highly selective, often choosing music that he personally liked. Director Paul Thomas Anderson, who worked with him, notes that "Altman's use of music is always important," adding, "Bob loved his music, didn't he? My God, he loved his music". Since he was a "great fan" of Leonard Cohen's music, for example, saying he would "just get stoned and play that stuff" all the time he used three of his songs in McCabe and Mrs. Miller (1971), and another for the final scene in A Wedding (1978).

For Nashville (1975), Altman had numerous new country music songs written by his cast to create a realistic atmosphere. He incorporated a "hauntingly repeated melody" in The Long Goodbye (1973), and employed Harry Nilsson and Van Dyke Parks to score Popeye (1980).

A number of music experts have written about Altman's use of music, including Richard R. Ness, who wrote about the scores for many of Altman's films in an article, considered to be a valuable resource for understanding Altman's filmmaking technique. Similarly, cinema studies professor Krin Gabbard wrote an analysis of Altman's use of jazz music in Short Cuts (1993), noting that few critics have considered the "importance of the music" in the film.

Jazz was also significant in Kansas City (1996). In that film, the music is considered to be the basis of the story. Altman states that "the whole idea was not to be too specific about the story," but to have the film itself be "rather a sort of jazz." Altman's technique of making the theme of a film a form of music, was considered "an experiment nobody has tried before," with Altman admitting it was risky. "I didn't know if it would work. ... If people 'get it,' then they really tend to like it."

== Influence ==
Directors who are influenced by Altman include Paul Thomas Anderson, Wes Anderson, Judd Apatow, Richard Linklater, Alejandro González Iñárritu, Noah Baumbach, David Gordon Green, Phil Lord and Christopher Miller, the Safdie brothers, Harmony Korine, Michael Winterbottom, and James Gunn. Altman gave several directors, including Alan Rudolph, Reza Badiyi, and Richard C. Sarafian, their starts in filmmaking.

== Filmography ==
Directed features
Year	Title	Distribution
1957	The Delinquents	United Artists
1957	The James Dean Story	Warner Bros.
1967	Countdown	Warner Bros.
1969	That Cold Day in the Park	Commonwealth United Entertainment
1970	M*A*S*H	20th Century Fox
1970	Brewster McCloud	Metro-Goldwyn-Mayer
1971	McCabe & Mrs. Miller	Warner Bros.
1972	Images	Columbia Pictures
1973	The Long Goodbye	United Artists
1974	Thieves Like Us	United Artists
1974	California Split	Columbia Pictures
1975	Nashville	Paramount Pictures
1976	Buffalo Bill and the Indians, or Sitting Bull's History Lesson	United Artists
1977	3 Women	20th Century Fox
1978	A Wedding	20th Century Fox
1979	Quintet	20th Century Fox
1979	A Perfect Couple	20th Century Fox
1980	Health	20th Century Fox
1980	Popeye	Paramount Pictures
1982	Come Back to the 5 & Dime, Jimmy Dean, Jimmy Dean	Cinecom Pictures
1983	Streamers	United Artists Classics
1984	Secret Honor	Cinecom Pictures
1985	Fool for Love	Cannon Group
1987	Beyond Therapy	New World Pictures
1987	O.C. and Stiggs	Metro-Goldwyn-Mayer
1990	Vincent & Theo	Hemdale Film Corporation
1992	The Player	Fine Line Features
1993	Short Cuts	Fine Line Features
1994	Prêt-à-Porter	Miramax Films
1996	Kansas City	Fine Line Features
1998	The Gingerbread Man	PolyGram Filmed Entertainment
1999	Cookie's Fortune	October Films
2000	Dr. T & the Women	Artisan Entertainment
2001	Gosford Park	USA Films
2003	The Company	Sony Pictures Classics
2006	A Prairie Home Companion	Picturehouse

== Frequent collaborators ==
Altman's improvisational, ensemble-based approach to filmmaking led him to cast many of the same actors repeatedly. Actors who appeared in three or more of his films, in lead, supporting or cameo roles, include Shelley Duvall (7), Bert Remsen (7), Paul Dooley (6), Elliott Gould (5), Rene Auberjonois (5), Michael Murphy (5), Jeff Goldblum (4), Lily Tomlin (4), Lyle Lovett (4), Henry Gibson (4), David Arkin (4), John Schuck (4), Tim Robbins (3), Carol Burnett (3), Keith Carradine (3), Sally Kellerman (3), Geraldine Chaplin (3), Ann Ryerson (3), Belita Moreno (3), Richard E. Grant (3) and Craig Richard Nelson (3).

Work Actor	1957	1967	1969	1970		1971	1972	1973	1974		1975	1976	1977	1978	1979		1980		1982	1983	1984	1985	1987		1990	1992	1993	1994	1996	1998	1999	2000	2001	2003	2006
Work Actor	The Delinquents	Countdown	That Cold Day in the Park	M*A*S*H	Brewster McCloud	McCabe & Mrs. Miller	Images	The Long Goodbye	Thieves Like Us	California Split	Nashville	Buffalo Bill and the Indians, or Sitting Bull's History Lesson	3 Women	A Wedding	Quintet	A Perfect Couple	Health	Popeye	Come Back to the 5 & Dime, Jimmy Dean, Jimmy Dean	Streamers	Secret Honor	Fool for Love	O.C. and Stiggs	Beyond Therapy	Vincent & Theo	The Player	Short Cuts	Prêt-à-Porter	Kansas City	The Gingerbread Man	Cookie's Fortune	Dr. T & the Women	Gosford Park	The Company	A Prairie Home Companion
Caroline Aaron																			check				check												
David Arkin				check				check			check							check																	
René Auberjonois				check	check	check	check																			check									
Ned Beatty											check																				check				
Karen Black											check								check							check									
Carol Burnett														check			check																		
Keith Carradine						check			check		check																								
Geraldine Chaplin											check	check		check																					
Robert DoQui											check	check																							
Paul Dooley														check		check	check	check					check			check									
Robert Downey Jr.																											check			check					
Robert Duvall		check		check																										check					
Shelley Duvall					check	check			check		check	check	check					check																	
Henry Gibson								check			check					check	check																		
Jeff Goldblum									check	check	check													check		check									
Elliott Gould				check				check		check	check															check									
Richard E. Grant																										check		check					check		
Glenda Jackson																	check							check											
Sally Kellerman				check	check																							check							
Jennifer Jason Leigh																											check		check						
Lyle Lovett																										check	check		check		check				
Matthew Modine																				check							check								
Julianne Moore																											check				check				
Belita Moreno													check	check		check																			
Michael Murphy		check	check	check	check	check					check																		check						
Craig Richard Nelson													check	check	check																				
Paul Newman												check			check																				
Bert Remsen					check	check			check	check	check	check		check																					
Jack Riley						check		check																											
Tim Robbins																										check	check	check							
Ann Ryerson														check		check	check																		
John Schuck				check	check	check			check																										
Tom Skerritt				check					check																										
Lili Taylor																											check	check							
Lily Tomlin											check															check	check								check
Liv Tyler																															check	check			
Ray Walston																		check					check												
Fred Ward																										check	check								

== Awards and honors ==
Altman received various awards and nominations including seven Academy Award nominations winning the Honorary Oscar in 2006. He received seven British Academy Film Award nominations winning twice for The Player (1992), and Gosford Park (2001). He received the Primetime Emmy Award for Outstanding Directing for a Drama Series for Tanner '88 (1988). He also received five Golden Globe Award nominations, winning the Golden Globe Award for Best Director for Gosford Park. He also received various awards from film festivals including the Cannes Film Festival's prestigious Palme d'Or for M*A*S*H and the Cannes Film Festival Award for Best Director for The Player. He has also received the Berlin International Film Festival's Golden Bear, and the Venice Film Festival's Golden Lion. In 1994, he received the Directors Guild of America Lifetime Achievement Award.

Awards and nominations received by Altman's films
Year	Title	Academy Awards		BAFTA Awards		Golden Globe Awards	
Year	Title	Nominations	Wins	Nominations	Wins	Nominations	Wins
1970	M*A*S*H	5	1	6	1	6	1
1971	McCabe & Mrs. Miller	1		1			
1972	Images	1		1		1	
1975	Nashville	5	1	5	1	11	1
1977	3 Women			1			
1978	A Wedding			2		1	
1982	Come Back to the Five and Dime, Jimmy Dean, Jimmy Dean					1	
1992	The Player	3		5	2	4	2
1993	Short Cuts	1				2	1
1994	Prêt-à-Porter					2	
2001	Gosford Park	7	1	9	2	5	1
Total		21	3	30	6	33	6

Directed Academy Award performances
Under Altman's direction, these actors have received Academy Award nominations for their performances in their respective roles.

Year	Performer	Film	Result
Academy Award for Best Actress
1971	Julie Christie	McCabe & Mrs. Miller	Nominated
Academy Award for Best Supporting Actress
1970	Sally Kellerman	M*A*S*H	Nominated
1975	Ronee Blakley	Nashville	Nominated
1975	Lily Tomlin	Nashville	Nominated
2001	Helen Mirren	Gosford Park	Nominated
2001	Maggie Smith	Gosford Park	Nominated

== Personal life ==
=== Family ===
Altman was married three times: His first wife was LaVonne Elmer. They were married from 1947 to 1949, and had a daughter, Christine. His second wife was Lotus Corelli. They were married from 1950 to 1955, and had two sons, Michael and Stephen. At fifteen, Michael wrote the lyrics to "Suicide Is Painless", the theme song to Altman's film, M*A*S*H. Stephen is a production designer who often worked with his father. Altman's third wife was Kathryn Reed. They were married from 1957 until his death in 2006. They had two sons, Robert and Matthew. Altman became the stepfather to Konni Reed when he married Kathryn.

Kathryn Altman, who died in 2016, co-authored a book about Altman that was published in 2014. She had served as a consultant and narrator for the 2014 documentary Altman, and had spoken at many retrospective screenings of her husband's films.

=== Homes ===
In the 1960s, Altman lived for years in Mandeville Canyon in Brentwood, California. He resided in Malibu throughout the 1970s, but sold that home and the Lion's Gate production company in 1981. "I had no choice", he told The New York Times. "Nobody was answering the phone" after the flop of Popeye. He moved his family and business headquarters to New York City, but eventually moved back to Malibu, where he lived until his death.

=== Political views ===
In November 2000, Altman claimed that he would move to Paris if George W. Bush were elected, but joked that he had meant Paris, Texas, when it came to pass. He noted that "the state would be better off if he (Bush) is out of it." Altman was an outspoken marijuana user, and served as a member of the NORML advisory board. He was also an atheist and an anti-war activist. He was one of numerous public figures, including linguist Noam Chomsky and actress Susan Sarandon, who signed the "Not in Our Name" declaration opposing the 2003 invasion of Iraq. Julian Fellowes believes that Altman's anti-war and anti-Bush stance cost him the Best Director Oscar for Gosford Park.

Altman despised the television series M*A*S*H which followed his 1970 film, citing it as being the antithesis of what his movie was about, and citing its anti-war messages as being "racist". In the 2001 DVD commentary for M*A*S*H, he stated clearly the reasons for which he disapproved of the series.

== Death and legacy ==
Altman died from leukemia at Cedars-Sinai Medical Center in Los Angeles on November 20, 2006, at age 81.

Fellow film director Paul Thomas Anderson dedicated his 2007 film There Will Be Blood to Altman. Anderson had worked as a standby director on A Prairie Home Companion for insurance purposes in the event the ailing 80-year-old Altman would be unable to finish shooting.

During a celebration tribute to Altman a few months after his death, he was described as a "passionate filmmaker" and auteur who rejected convention, creating what director Alan Rudolph called an "Altmanesque" style of films. He preferred large casts of actors and natural overlapping conversations, and encouraged his actors to improvise and express their innate creativity without fear of failing. Lily Tomlin compared him to "a great benign patriarch who was always looking out for you as an actor," adding that "you're not afraid to take chances with him."

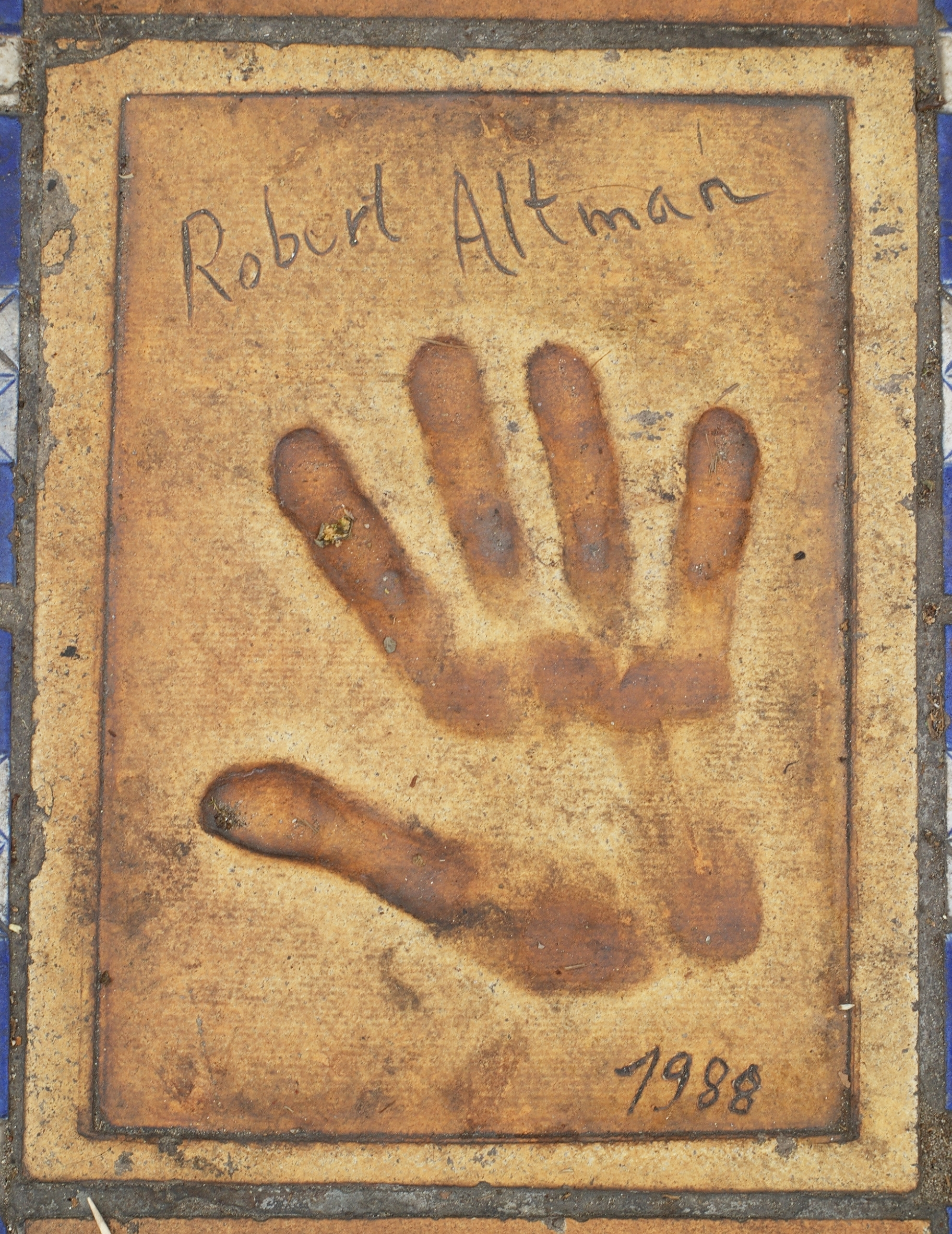
Altman's handprints outside Palais des Festivals et des Congrès in Cannes, France

Many of his films are described as "acid satires and counterculture character studies that redefined and reinvigorated modern cinema." Although his films spanned most film genres, such as Westerns, musicals, war films, or comedies, he was considered "anti-genre," and his films were "candidly subversive." He was known to hate the "phoniness" he saw in most mainstream films, and "he wanted to explode them" through satire.

Actor Tim Robbins, who starred in a number of Altman's films, describes some of the unique aspects of his directing method:

He created a unique and wonderful world on his sets, ... where the mischievous dad unleashed the "children actors" to play. Where your imagination was encouraged, nurtured, laughed at, embraced and Altman-ized. A sweet anarchy that many of us hadn't felt since the schoolyard, unleashed by Bob's wild heart.

Altman's personal archives are located at the University of Michigan, which include about 900 boxes of personal papers, scripts, legal, business and financial records, photographs, props and related material. Altman had filmed Secret Honor at the university, as well as directed several operas there.

Since 2009, the Robert Altman Award is awarded to the director, casting director, and ensemble cast of films at the yearly Independent Spirit Awards.

In 2014 a feature-length documentary film, Altman, was released, which looks at his life and work with film clips and interviews.

== See also ==
- List of atheists in film, radio, television and theater
- List of Golden Globe winners
- List of Primetime Emmy Award winners
- Hyperlink cinema

== Bibliography ==
- "Robert Altman Bibliography". U.C. Berkeley. Archived from the original on August 9, 2018.
- Syska, Rafal (2008). Keep the Distance. The film world of Robert Altman. Kraków: Rabid. ISBN 978-83-60236-36-9.
- Caso, Frank (2015). Robert Altman in the American Grain. London: Reaktion Books. ISBN 978-1-78023-522-6.
- The director's commentary on the McCabe & Mrs. Miller DVD, while focusing on that film, also to some degree covers Altman's general methodology as a director.
- Judith M. Kass. Robert Altman: American Innovator early (1978) assessment of the director's work and his interest in gambling. Part of Leonard Maltin's Popular Library filmmaker series.
- The English band Maxïmo Park have a song named "Robert Altman," a b-side to their single "Our Velocity."
- The Criterion Collection has released several of Altman's films on DVD (Short Cuts, 3 Women, Tanner 88, Secret Honor) which include audio commentary and video interviews with him that shed light on his directing style.
- Warren, Charles (2006). Crouse, Jeffey (ed.). "Cavell, Altman and Cassavetes". Film International. Stanley Cavell special issue. Vol. 4, no. 22. pp. 14–20.
- Rick Armstrong, "Robert Altman: Critical Essays" Actors, historians, film scholars, and cultural theorists reflect on Altman and his five-decade career... (McFarland, February 18, 2011.)
- Mitchell Zuckoff, Robert Altman: The Oral Biography. New York: Alfred A. Knopf, 2009. ISBN 978-0-307-26768-9
- Description and details on the Short Cuts Soundtrack for more in-depth information about this title.
- Helene Keyssar, Robert Altman's America. Oxford, 1991.
