= That Cold Day in the Park =

1969 film by Robert Altman

- Theatrical release poster
- Directed by: Robert Altman
- Screenplay by: Gillian Freeman
- Based on: That Cold Day in the Park; 1965 novel by Richard Miles
- Produced by: Donald Factor; Leon Mirell
- Starring: Sandy Dennis; Michael Burns; Susanne Benton; John Garfield, Jr. Luana Anders
- Cinematography: László Kovács
- Edited by: Danford B. Greene
- Music by: Johnny Mandel
- Production company: Commonwealth United Entertainment
- Distributed by: Commonwealth United
- Release date: June 8, 1969 (US)
- Running time: 113 minutes
- Countries: United States; Canada
- Language: English
- Budget: $1,200,000

That Cold Day in the Park is a 1969 psychological drama thriller film directed by Robert Altman and starring Sandy Dennis. Based on the novel of the same name by Richard Miles and adapted for the screen by Gillian Freeman, it was filmed on location in Vancouver, British Columbia, where the events occur. The supporting cast includes Michael Burns, Susanne Benton, Luana Anders, John Garfield, Jr., and Michael Murphy.

== Plot ==
Frances Austen, a woman who has inherited her late parents' Vancouver apartment, notices a nineteen-year-old boy sitting in the rain in a nearby park and invites him inside. The boy does not speak but appears to understand everything. Frances runs a bath for him, gives him a meal, and makes up a bed in her spare room; when the boy has settled down for the night, she quietly locks him in. Frances buys him new clothes the next day. That night the boy slips away through the spare room window. He briefly visits his parents and younger siblings, then goes to a houseboat owned by his older sister, Nina. He tells Nina and her boyfriend Nick what has happened to him. He is perfectly well able to speak, but Nina explains to Nick that he has a habit of going mute and refusing to talk to people. The three of them share cookies, home made by Nina and containing cannabis.

The next day, the boy returns bearing homemade cookies and unexpectedly encounters Frances' maid, Mrs. Parnell. Frances invites him in and tells Mrs. Parnell to leave early. Mrs. Parnell remarks that the cookies are burnt, but Frances opens an expensive bottle of wine to accompany them; neither woman notices their real nature. Frances holds one-sided conversations and flirts with the boy, developing a growing attachment. The following day she has to go out and will not return before evening. While she is away, Nina enters by the spare room window. She takes a bath, and pulls her half-dressed brother into the water. Meanwhile Frances has had a contraceptive diaphragm fitted and dispensed at a local family planning clinic; she then goes to play lawn bowls with a group of friends, most of them people much older than herself. Charles, a doctor from the group, accompanies Frances home, where he makes romantic and sexual advances towards her. She refuses him and he leaves.

Frances goes to the spare room. It is in darkness, with a shape visible under the bedclothes. She tells the boy about Charles. For years he has wanted to have sex with her. Frances says repeatedly that she is not at all attracted to him, that he smells old, that he disgusts her. Finally she lies down on the bed and asks the boy to have sex with her - only to discover that no one else is there, and the shape under the bedcover is made of dolls and stuffed toys.

The boy sneaks back into his room and sleeps until the next day, when he finds that all of the doors and windows have been nailed shut. He confronts Frances, who apologizes but insists that she wants things to remain as they are, leaving him locked in the house as she goes out to a bar. She notices a woman sitting alone and invites her to come spend the night with the boy, but the woman becomes upset. A man overhears and helps Frances find a prostitute named Sylvia at a nearby diner. Frances brings Sylvia home and locks her in the room with the boy, then listens through the door as they have sex. Overcome with emotion, Frances enters the room and stabs Sylvia through the heart, killing her. The boy desperately searches for an exit but Frances tells him that he can stay with her and that he does not have to be afraid. As the credits roll, she kisses him repeatedly and tells him she wants him to have sex with her while he remains in a horrified state.

== Cast ==
- Sandy Dennis - Frances Austen
- Michael Burns - The Boy
- Susanne Benton - Nina
- David Garfield - Nick (billed as John Garfield, Jr.)
- Luana Anders - Sylvia
- Edward Greenhalgh - Dr. Stevenson
- Lloyd Berry - Mr. Parnell
- Rae Brown - Mrs. Parnell
- Linda Sorenson - Prostitute
- Doris Buckingham - Mrs. Ebury
- Frank Wade - Mr. Ebury
- Alicia Ammon - Mrs. Pitt
- Michael Murphy - The Rounder

== Themes ==
Writer Frank Caso identified themes of the film as including obsession and personality disorder, and linked the film to director Robert Altman's later films Images (1972) and 3 Women (1977), declaring them a trilogy.

== Release ==
The film was screened at the 1969 Cannes Film Festival outside of the main competition.

== Critical reception ==
Roger Ebert of the Chicago Sun-Times gave the film a negative review, declaring that while it was well-shot, the plot was too convoluted and absurd to generate any suspense:

The plot is too improbable to be taken seriously, and yet director Robert Altman apparently does take it seriously. And so we get a torturous essay on abnormal psychology when, with less trouble, we could have had a simple, juicy horror film. There are some of the same exploitation angles as Rosemary's Baby (clinical discussions of reproduction, an eerie apartment, strange games), but they just don't work. In a straightforward horror movie, you can push pretty far before the audience starts laughing; they want to be scared. But That Cold Day in the Park doesn't declare itself as a horror film until too late, and the audience is already lost.

The review aggregator Rotten Tomatoes gave the film a rating of 50% based on 8 reviews.

== See also ==
- List of American films of 1969
