= The Laundromat (1985 film) =

1985 film directed by Robert Altman

- Title card
- Based on: Third and Oak: The Laundromat by Marsha Norman
- Written by: Marsha Norman
- Directed by: Robert Altman
- Starring: Carol Burnett; Amy Madigan; Michael Wright
- Composer: Alberta Hunter
- Country of origin: United States
- Original language: English

Production
- Cinematography: Pierre Mignot
- Editor: Luce Grunenwaldt
- Running time: 59 minutes
- Production companies: Byck-Lancaster Production; Sandcastle 5 Productions

Original release
- Network: HBO
- Release: April 1, 1985

The Laundromat is a 1985 drama television film directed by Robert Altman starring Carol Burnett, Amy Madigan, and Michael Wright. It is adapted from the first act of the play Third and Oak: The Laundromat by Marsha Norman. It was the third and final film made together by Altman and Burnett.

== Plot ==
Alberta Johnson visits a laundromat at night and finds the attendant asleep. She posts an ad for unused gardening tools on the bulletin board. Later DeeDee Johnson enters and attempts to converse with Alberta, who remains guarded. DeeDee requires assistance doing the laundry correctly and explains that she is waiting for her husband to return to their apartment that can be seen across the street. DeeDee attempts to wash a shirt in Alberta's bag stained by cabbage soup but Alberta refuses to let her wash it, claiming that she intends to pre-soak it first.

A deejay named Shooter Stevens enters and DeeDee converses with him with interest. He invites DeeDee to come play pool with him at the bar next door and DeeDee, fearing that her husband is cheating on her, considers leaving with him but ultimately remains in the laundromat with Alberta. When Alberta suggests that DeeDee should leave her husband, the two get into an argument about their relationships until Alberta explains that her husband died a year earlier when he was taking out the trash, causing his shirt to be stained with her cabbage soup.

DeeDee sees that her husband has returned just as her laundry is done. Alberta places her husband's shirt in the washer and dumps the rest of the box of detergent in with it, causing suds to overflow from the machine as the two women laugh.

== Cast ==
- Carol Burnett as Alberta Johnson
- Amy Madigan as DeeDee Johnson
- Michael Wright as Shooter Stevens

== Production ==
The film was shot in Paris, France. The songs in the film were performed by Alberta Hunter courtesy of CBS Records.

== Reception ==
Reviewer Sheila Benson of the Los Angeles Times wrote, "Even if you know the dynamics of the piece before it begins, there are great portions of Norman’s dialogue between these two deeply lonely wives that speak about the expected in an unexpectedly moving manner."

Reviewer John J. O'Connor of The New York Times wrote, "Miss Madigan manages to be frail and tough, aggressive and vulnerable in equally impressive doses. And Miss Burnett, once again demonstrating her stunning capabilities as a dramatic actress, takes the familiar character of Alberta through a range of emotions that makes this ordinary woman memorable. In the end, it is a display of acting power very much worth watching."

== Accolades ==
Amy Madigan received an ACE Award for Best Actress in a Theatrical or Dramatic Special and Robert Altman received an ACE Award for Best Director of a Theatrical or Dramatic Special. Writer Marsha Norman and editor Luce Grunenwaldt were also nominated for ACE Awards.
