= Beyond Therapy (film) =

1987 film by Robert Altman

- Theatrical release poster
- Directed by: Robert Altman
- Screenplay by: Robert Altman
- Based on: Beyond Therapy by Christopher Durang
- Produced by: Steven Haft
- Starring: Julie Hagerty; Jeff Goldblum; Glenda Jackson; Tom Conti; Christopher Guest
- Cinematography: Pierre Mignot
- Edited by: Jennifer Augé
- Music by: Gabriel Yared; George Gershwin
- Production company: Sandcastle 5 Productions
- Distributed by: New World Pictures
- Release date: February 27, 1987
- Running time: 93 minutes
- Country: United States
- Language: English
- Budget: $3.5 million
- Box office: $790,000

Beyond Therapy is a 1987 American comedy film written and directed by Robert Altman, based on the 1981 play of the same name by Christopher Durang. It stars Julie Hagerty, Jeff Goldblum, Glenda Jackson, Tom Conti, and Christopher Guest.

== Plot ==
Two Manhattanites, Prudence and Bruce, are seeking stable romantic relationships with the help of their respective psychiatrists, lecherous Stuart and scatterbrained Charlotte, each of whom suggests the patient place a personal ad. Their first meeting proves to be a disaster, but when they reunite sparks begin to fly. Complications ensue when bisexual Bruce's jealous live-in lover Bob decides to assert himself and do everything possible to maintain his status quo.

== Cast ==
- Julie Hagerty as Prudence
- Jeff Goldblum as Bruce
- Glenda Jackson as Charlotte
- Tom Conti as Stuart
- Christopher Guest as Bob
- Geneviève Page as Zizi
- Cris Campion as Andrew
- Sandrine Dumas as Cindy
- Bertrand Bonvoisin as Le Gérant
- Nicole Evans as The Cashier
- Louis-Marie Taillefer as Le Chef
- Matthew Leonard-Lesniak as Mr. Bean
- Laure Killing as Charlie

== Production ==
According to Durang, both he and Altman wrote separate screenplays. Ultimately, Durang's script was rewritten substantially by Altman, and Durang later described the project as "a very unhappy experience and outcome."

Despite its New York City setting, the film was made in Paris where director Robert Altman was living at the time.

== Reception ==
Gene Siskel and Roger Ebert gave the film "two thumbs down" on their TV program. Ebert, in his print review, gave it one star out of four and called it a film "killed by terminal whimsy. It's a movie in which every scene must have seemed like a lot of fun at the time, but, when they're edited together, there's no pattern to the movie, nothing to build toward, no reason for us to care. It's all behavior." Vincent Canby of The New York Times wrote that the film lacked "the kind of inexorable logic that is the fuel of any farce and makes its loony characters so funny...The performances are good, but the film has been assembled without an overriding sense of humor and style. It remains in bits and pieces." Frank Rizzo of Variety called it "a mediocre film version of Christopher Durang's mediocre play. The difference is that this comedy somehow won a good measure of popular success onstage, whereas the screen version is headed nowhere." Dave Kehr of the Chicago Tribune gave the film one star out of four and wrote, "When Altman goes wrong, he usually goes spectacularly wrong—as in 'Quintet' and 'Health'—but this time he has just gone glumly, crushingly wrong. 'Beyond Therapy' never builds up any genuine energy, direction or swing: It just huffs and puffs and eventually hyperventilates." Sheila Benson of the Los Angeles Times was positive, praising "three great comic performances" from "the juiciest cast imaginable." Tom Milne of The Monthly Film Bulletin wrote, "Beyond Therapy is a scattershot film, even more so than usual with Altman, offering a firework display of one-liners and their visual equivalents, some brilliantly funny, some less successful."

On Rotten Tomatoes, the film has an approval rating of 17%, based on reviews from 12 critics.
