= The James Dean Story =

1957 film by Robert Altman

- Theatrical release poster
- Directed by: Robert Altman; George W. George
- Story by: Stewart Stern
- Produced by: Robert Altman; George W. George
- Narrated by: Martin Gabel
- Edited by: Robert Altman; George W. George
- Music by: Leith Stevens
- Distributed by: Warner Bros.
- Release date: January 14, 1957 (Japan)
- Running time: 81 minutes
- Country: United States
- Language: English

The James Dean Story is a 1957 American documentary.

Released two years after Dean's death, the Warner Bros. release chronicles his short life and career through black-and-white still photographs, interviews with the aunt and uncle who raised him, his paternal grandparents, a New York City cabdriver friend, and the owner of his favorite Los Angeles restaurant, and outtakes from East of Eden, footage of the opening night of Giant, and Dean's public service announcement for safe driving from Warner Bros. Presents.

Martin Gabel's narration was written by Stewart Stern, who scripted Dean's Rebel Without a Cause. A directing credit was shared by Robert Altman and George W. George.

== Soundtrack ==
The music accompanying The James Dean Story was composed and conducted by Leith Stevens, and featured Tommy Sands singing the theme song, "Let Me Be Loved". A tie-in album, Theme Music from "The James Dean Story", released by World Pacific Records in 1957, featured the jazz trumpeter, Chet Baker, and the flutist and saxophonist, Bud Shank.

The film is available on DVD.
