= The Gingerbread Man (film) =

- Theatrical release poster
- Directed by: Robert Altman
- Screenplay by: Robert Altman (as Al Hayes)
- Based on: A manuscript by John Grisham
- Produced by: Jeremy Tannenbaum
- Starring: Kenneth Branagh; Embeth Davidtz; Robert Downey Jr.; Daryl Hannah; Tom Berenger; Robert Duvall
- Cinematography: Gu Changwei
- Edited by: Geraldine Peroni
- Music by: Mark Isham
- Production companies: Island Pictures; Enchanter Entertainment
- Distributed by: PolyGram Filmed Entertainment
- Release date: January 23, 1998
- Running time: 114 minutes
- Country: United States
- Language: English
- Budget: $25 million
- Box office: $1.5 million (USA)

The Gingerbread Man is a 1998 American legal thriller film directed by Robert Altman and based on a discarded John Grisham manuscript. The film stars Kenneth Branagh, Embeth Davidtz, Robert Downey Jr., Tom Berenger, Daryl Hannah, Famke Janssen, and Robert Duvall.

== Plot ==
Rick Magruder is a successful attorney in Savannah, Georgia, with a reputation for underhanded dealings and a tense relationship with his ex-wife, Leeanne. After a party hosted by his firm, waitress Mallory Doss has her car stolen and Rick drives her home, where her car has seemingly been left by her father, Dixon. Arguing about her father's abusive behavior, an emotional Mallory undresses in front of Rick, and they spend the night together.

Rick discovers Mallory's cat has been killed, and she asks him for protection from her father. With the help of his associate Lois Harlan and investigator Clyde Pell, Rick has Dixon taken into custody and arranges a hearing, where Mallory's ex-husband Pete Randle reluctantly testifies about his former father-in-law's unstable and violent behavior. Declaring that the charges against him are fabricated, the erratic Dixon is sentenced to treatment in a mental institution and nearly attacks Mallory, vowing revenge.

Rick and Mallory continue their relationship, but learn that Dixon's friends have broken him out of the institution. A threatening photograph of Mallory arrives on Rick's doorstep just before her car is set on fire, but Rick's history of defending criminals leaves the police unwilling to help. He brings her to stay with Lois, guarded by Clyde, and receives threatening photographs of his own children. Taking his gun, Rick forcibly pulls his children out of school and calls Leeanne from a motel to assure her it is for their own safety, but discovers the children are missing.

Desperate to find them, Rick picks up Mallory as she is leaving town, and she brings him to her father's remote cabin, where Dixon confronts him with a shotgun and Rick fatally shoots him in self-defense. Dixon's friends flee and Rick gives chase, but Clyde arrives with news that his children were safely left at a police station. Rick is taken into custody, as is Mallory as the cabin burns down. In the aftermath, Rick begins to suspect Mallory has set him up.

Dixon's will is destroyed in the fire, but Rick discovers the timber on his land is worth millions, and that Mallory and Pete never actually divorced. With Mallory granted ownership of Dixon's estate, Rick sends Clyde to watch her as a hurricane arrives. Unable to reach Clyde, Rick sneaks aboard Pete's ship and finds Clyde dead. He is attacked by Pete, and Mallory fires a flare gun at them as they struggle, knocking Pete into the water to his death. She claims to have been trying to save Rick, who tricks her into trying to shoot him as well. Revealing that a surviving copy of her father's will left everything to her, Rick traps Mallory and signals for help.

Sometime later, at the courthouse, Rick agrees to a plea deal that includes disbarment, accepting his role in Dixon's death, and watches as Mallory is led away in handcuffs to her own fate.

== Cast ==
- Kenneth Branagh as Rick Magruder
- Embeth Davidtz as Mallory Doss
- Robert Downey Jr. as Clyde Pell
- Tom Berenger as Pete Randle
- Daryl Hannah as Lois Harlan
- Robert Duvall as Dixon Doss
- Famke Janssen as Leeanne Magruder
- Jesse James as Jeff Magruder
- Mae Whitman as Libby Magruder
- Wilbur Fitzgerald as Judge Russo
- Christine Seabrook as School Secretary

== Production ==
The film was based on an original story by John Grisham that was subsequently adapted into screenplay form. Kenneth Branagh liked the story and agreed to do the film but only if a highly regarded director signed on as well. In July 1996, it was announced that Luis Mandoki was to direct the film, with Annette Bening in the female lead, and it was to have been filmed in Memphis, Tennessee. However, when Bening fell pregnant, she had to drop out, with Mandoki departing shortly afterwards. Branagh went to work on The Proposition while the producers looked for another director. John Dahl was offered the film before the producers settled on Robert Altman. Altman wanted to work with Branagh but only, as he told him, "If we can fool the audience by not making you the hero, by making you flawed."

Once Altman came on board, he heavily re-worked the script, giving credit to the pseudonymous Al Hayes. Altman said in an interview, "I just wanted to change the elements of these kinds of stories as much as I could and then I wanted to stay out of the courtroom." Altman changed the setting to Savannah, Georgia, and added the threat of a hurricane throughout the movie. For the look of the film, Altman was inspired by The Night of the Hunter.

Principal photography would occur during early 1997. In addition to Two Girls and a Guy, which was also shot in the early months of 1997, the film was Robert Downey Jr.'s first acting role after a 1996 drug arrest. It has been said that Downey Jr. "didn't even read the script" when he accepted the role.

== Release ==
The Gingerbread Man was intended to open in the fall of 1997 but was delayed after an audience test screening reportedly went poorly. Polygram Films brought in an outsider to re-edit the movie without informing Altman, and claimed that his version "lacked tension and suffered from an inappropriate music score". At one point, the publicized squabble between the studio and the filmmaker got so bad that he wanted his name taken off the film. According to Branagh, the film previewed well but not up to the expectations of the studio. He said in an interview: "There's this enormous pressure to wrap everything up neatly and to resist things that stray from formula. Anything that suggests complexity in a character makes them unsympathetic in the eyes of some people, and they see that as a great crime." Polygram backed down when their version tested worse than Altman's in a preview. The studio was upset that Altman had completely rewritten Grisham's script so that it was more critical about lawyers.

Years later, Ray Pride interviewed Altman about the post-production debacle and he replied, "Well, it's criminal, their treatment of that film. There was a vindictive order from the guy who was running [Polygram Films], he was so pissed off with me, he literally told them, 'I want that movie killed.' We're talking to lawyers, but it's almost impossible to win a lawsuit. You can't prove what a film could have done. They were just pissed off because it didn't test the way they wanted it to with the teenagers, y'know, in those malls."

== Reception ==
On the review aggregator website Rotten Tomatoes, 60% of 47 critics' reviews are positive. Metacritic, which uses a weighted average, assigned the film a score of 65 out of 100, based on 18 critics, indicating "generally favorable" reviews.

In his review for the San Francisco Chronicle, Mick LaSalle wrote, "If it weren't for Altman's touches, The Gingerbread Man would be a mediocre thriller. Even with them, it can't be more than a top-notch genre film, but top-notch is top-notch." Jay Carr of The Boston Globe said that the film "is fun junk...We're talking claptrap here, but it's more enjoyable than it has any business being, thanks to director Robert Altman and star Kenneth Branagh." In his review for The Independent, Boyd Tonkin wrote, "It does not sprawl or wander as the Altman of old would have. Neither does it ever really catch alight. This is a waterlogged venture in more ways than one." Roger Ebert, giving the film three stars, labeled the film as "all atmospheric, quirky, and entertaining."
