= Kansas City (film) =

1996 American crime film by Robert Altman

- Theatrical release poster
- Directed by: Robert Altman
- Written by: Robert Altman; Frank Barhydt
- Produced by: Robert Altman
- Starring: Jennifer Jason Leigh; Miranda Richardson; Harry Belafonte; Michael Murphy; Dermot Mulroney; Steve Buscemi; Brooke Smith; Jane Adams
- Cinematography: Oliver Stapleton
- Edited by: Geraldine Peroni
- Production company: Ciby 2000
- Distributed by: Fine Line Features
- Release date: August 16, 1996
- Running time: 116 minutes
- Country: United States
- Language: English
- Budget: $19 million
- Box office: $1,356,329

Kansas City is a 1996 American crime film directed by Robert Altman, and starring Jennifer Jason Leigh, Miranda Richardson, Harry Belafonte, Michael Murphy, Dermot Mulroney and Steve Buscemi. The musical score of Kansas City is integrated into the film, with modern-day musicians recreating the Kansas City jazz of 1930s.

The film was entered into the 1996 Cannes Film Festival.

== Plot ==
On the afternoon before the 1934 Democratic primary election in Kansas City, petty thief Johnny O'Hara botches a robbery of Sheepshan Red, a wealthy Black gambler on a semi-annual trip to the Hey Hey Club, local Black mob kingpin Seldom Seen's jazz club and casino. As a token of respect to a highly lucrative customer, Seldom kidnaps Johnny himself and holds him at the Hey Hey Club, where he monologues to Johnny about racism and deliberates on how best to punish him. Kansas City jazz performances played at the Hey Hey Club are intercut with much of the film.

Blondie O'Hara, Johnny's Jean Harlow-obsessed wife, desperately searches for a way to secure Johnny's release. She decides to kidnap Carolyn Stilton, the wife of an influential local politician Henry Stilton, an adviser to President Franklin D. Roosevelt, leveraging his involvement with the imminent election to force him to free Johnny. Blondie kidnaps Carolyn at the Stilton mansion without much resistance. She finds that Carolyn is trapped in a loveless marriage, nursing a laudanum addiction to cope with her husband's emotional distance. Carolyn finds Blondie's devotion to her husband admirable, and a tenuous friendship forms between the two as they travel across the city and flee the alerted police.

When Blondie tells Henry about the kidnapping, he is torn between the obligation he feels towards his wife and the risks presented towards his re-election campaign. As a member of the Pendergast political machine, he secures the aid of its boss Thomas Pendergast, who agrees to indirectly reach out to Seldom. On the morning of the election, Blondie attempts to hide Carolyn at a bar owned by her brother (ironically a Pendergast ward heeler himself tasked with paying local vagrants and addicts to vote), but he realizes who Carolyn is and drives them away. When Seldom makes his decision to kill Johnny known, the latter offers to give himself as a slave to Seldom.

In the evening, Blondie and Carolyn finally return to the O'Hara home, from which Johnny had been kidnapped a day before. Henry manages to get Johnny released, but Seldom and his gangsters shoot and mutilate him before turning him over, and he collapses and dies once he enters the house. As Blondie weeps over his body, Carolyn grabs her gun and shoots Blondie dead. She leaves the house and enters Henry's car. He anxiously asks her if she is alright, but she does not reply.

== Cast ==
- Jennifer Jason Leigh as "Blondie" O'Hara
- Miranda Richardson as Carolyn Stilton
- Harry Belafonte as "Seldom Seen"
- Michael Murphy as Henry Stilton
- Dermot Mulroney as Johnny O'Hara
- Steve Buscemi as Johnny Flynn
- Brooke Smith as "Babe" Flynn
- Jane Adams as Nettie Bolt

== Reception ==
The film holds a 60% positive rating on Rotten Tomatoes, based on 42 reviews with an average rating of 6.0/10, earning it a "Fresh" score. On Metacritic, the film holds a weighted average score of 58 out of 100, based on 23 critics, indicating "mixed or average" reviews.

Roger Ebert gave it three stars for Altman's "originality and invention", saying the story is "fairly thin" but "Altman gathered some of the best living jazz musicians, put them on a set representing the Hey Hey Club, and asked them to play period material in the style of the Kansas City jazz giants (Count Basie, Coleman Hawkins, Jay McShann, Lester Young, etc.). He filmed their work in a concert documentary style, and intercuts it". Ebert praised the period recreation of colors and looks of the clothes, cars, and advertising and was reminded of Altman's other 1930s gangster movie, Thieves Like Us (1974). The Washington Post review commended the soundtrack, describing the film as Altman's "noir hommage to gangsters, dolls, pols and all that jazz. ... A mosaic of machine politics, misbegotten love and simmering swing era sound", concluding: "But ditch the characters and the plot, and you'd have yourself a swell music video."

Harry Belafonte won the New York Film Critics Award for Best Supporting Actor.

== Soundtrack ==
Professional ratings
Review scores
Source	Rating
AllMusic	4.5/5 stars

The soundtrack was produced by Hal Willner and Steven Bernstein and featured several contemporary musicians playing the roles of jazz musicians from the 1930s. For example, Joshua Redman plays the role of Lester Young, Craig Handy plays Coleman Hawkins, Geri Allen plays Mary Lou Williams, and James Carter plays Ben Webster.

=== Track listing ===
No.	Title	Writer(s)	Soloist(s)	Length
1.	"Blues in the Dark"	William "Count" Basie; James Rushing	James Carter & Joshua Redman	4:54
2.	"Moten Swing"	Bennie Moten; Buster Moten	Jesse Davis & James Carter	3:43
3.	"I Surrender Dear"	Harry Barris; Gordon Clifford	James Carter, Nicholas Payton & Cyrus Chestnut	6:02
4.	"Queer Notions"	Coleman Hawkins	David Murray, Russell Malone & Cyrus Chestnut	5:40
5.	"Lullaby of the Leaves"	Joe Young; Bernice Petkere	Jesse Davis, Clark Gayton & Geri Allen	4:26
6.	"I Left My Baby"	William "Count" Basie; James Rushing; Andy Gibson	Mark Whitfield, David Newman, Craig Handy & Curtis Fowlkes	7:24
7.	"Yeah, Man"	Joseph Russell Robinson; Noble Sissle	Craig Handy & Joshua Redman	5:00
8.	"Froggy Bottom"	Mary Lou Williams	Geri Allen, David Newman & Mark Whitfield	6:20
9.	"Solitude"	Irving Mills; Eddie DeLange; Duke Ellington	Joshua Redman	6:02
10.	"Pagin' the Devil"	Walter Page; Milt Gabler	Don Byron, Olu Dara & Clark Gayton	5:27
11.	"Lafayette"	William "Count" Basie; Eddie Durham	Nicholas Payton, James Zollar & Olu Dara	4:04
12.	"Solitude (Reprise)"	Irving Mills; Eddie DeLange; Duke Ellington	Don Byron, Christian McBride & Ron Carter	4:05
Total length:				63:07

=== Charts ===
Chart (1996)	Peak position
US Top Jazz Albums (Billboard)	6
