= Images (film) =

1972 psychological horror film by Robert Altman

- British theatrical poster, based on Charles Allan Gilbert's All is Vanity (1892)
- Directed by: Robert Altman
- Written by: Robert Altman; Susannah York (Note: York received a co-writing credit for having written In Search of Unicorns, a book featured in the film.)
- Produced by: Tommy Thompson
- Starring: Susannah York; René Auberjonois; Marcel Bozzuffi; Cathryn Harrison
- Cinematography: Vilmos Zsigmond
- Edited by: Graeme Clifford
- Music by: John Williams; Stomu Yamashta
- Production company: Hemdale Film Corporation
- Distributed by: Columbia Pictures (United States); Hemdale Film Distributors (United Kingdom)
- Release dates: May 9, 1972 (Cannes); October 19, 1972 (United Kingdom); December 18, 1972 (United States)
- Running time: 101 minutes
- Countries: United Kingdom; United States
- Language: English
- Budget: ~US$807,000

Images is a 1972 psychological horror film directed and co-written by Robert Altman and starring Susannah York, René Auberjonois and Marcel Bozzuffi. The picture follows an unstable children's author who finds herself engulfed in apparitions and hallucinations while staying at her remote vacation home.

Conceived by Altman in the mid-1960s, Images secured financing in 1971 by Hemdale Film Group Ltd., and shot on location in County Wicklow, Ireland in the fall of that year. The script, which had been sparsely composed by Altman, was collaboratively developed further throughout the shoot with the actors. Images premiered at the 25th Cannes Film Festival, where York won the award for Best Actress, after which it was released theatrically in the United States by Columbia Pictures on December 18, 1972. Its theatrical run in the United States was short-lived, and the film received little promotion from Hemdale in the United Kingdom.

Critical reception of the film was mixed, with some critics praising York's performance and Vilmos Zsigmond's cinematography, while others faulted it for being incoherent, comparing it to films like Repulsion (1965). The film was nominated for a Golden Globe Award for Best English-Language Foreign Film, and John Williams was nominated for an Academy Award for Best Original Score.

== Plot ==
Wealthy children's author Cathryn receives several disturbing calls in her home in London one night; the female voice on the other end, sometimes cutting in on other phone conversations, suggests mockingly that her husband Hugh is having an affair. Hugh comes home, finding Cathryn in distress. Hugh attempts to comfort Cathryn, who witnesses a different man who is behaving as if he were her husband. She screams in horror and backs away, only to see her vision of the figure revert to Hugh.

Hugh attributes Cathryn's outburst to stress and her pregnancy. He decides to take her on a vacation to an isolated cottage in the Irish countryside, where Cathryn can work on her book and take photographs for its illustrations. Upon her arrival, however, Cathryn hears voices saying her name and sees apparitions: while preparing lunch one day, she sees Hugh pass through the kitchen, then transform into her dead lover, Rene. Rene continues to appear to Cathryn around the house, and even speaks with her.

Cathryn's paranoia and visions become increasingly pervasive, and are exacerbated when a neighbor and ex-lover, Marcel, brings his adolescent daughter, Susannah, to visit. Cathryn becomes unable to distinguish Hugh from Rene or Marcel as the men shift before her eyes. One day, Rene taunts Cathryn, asking her to kill him if she wants to be rid of him, and hands her a shotgun. She shoots him through the abdomen; Susannah runs into the house and finds Cathryn standing in the den, having shot Hugh's camera to pieces. Cathryn claims that the gun accidentally fired when she was moving it.

Seeking solace, Cathryn goes to a nearby waterfall, where she often sees her doppelgänger staring back at her. After one such occurrence, she returns to the house, where Hugh tells her that he has to leave for business. Cathryn drives him to the train station and returns to the house, finding Marcel waiting inside. He begins to undress to have sex with her but she stabs him through the chest with a kitchen knife. The next morning, she encounters an elderly man walking his dog and invites him to come inside for coffee, in spite of the fact that Marcel's corpse apparently lies in the living room (which suggests that she regards the "murder" as a hallucination); the old man declines the invitation. Later in the evening, Susannah stops by the house and remarks that her father was not at home when she awoke that morning. Cathryn is alarmed by this as it could mean that she really did kill Marcel. She is relieved to hear that Marcel returned drunk after midnight, and invites Susannah in for a cup of tea after reasoning that Marcel cannot be dead on her living room floor. Susannah asks Cathryn if she looked like her when she was young before saying, "I'm going to be exactly like you."

After having tea, Cathryn drives Susannah home. Marcel comes out of the house and attempts to talk to Cathryn but she drives away. While on a stretch of road through a desolate field, Cathryn witnesses her doppelgänger again, attempting to wave her down. At the house, she finds that both Rene and Marcel's corpses have reappeared in the living room. Cathryn leaves again and encounters her doppelgänger at a bend in the road; this time she stops. The doppelgänger begs Cathryn to let her into the car and the two begin to speak in unison. She then hits the doppelgänger with the car, knocking her off a cliff and into a waterfall below. Cathryn then drives back to her home in London. There, she goes to take a shower. While in the bathroom, the door opens and the doppelgänger walks inside. Cathryn screams in terror, "I killed you," to which the doppelgänger responds serenely, "Not me." Hugh's corpse is then shown lying at the bottom of the falls: in reality it was he who begged her to let him into the car and was killed when Cathryn, believing that he was her doppelgänger, knocked him off the cliff.

== Cast ==
- Susannah York as Cathryn
- René Auberjonois as Hugh
- Marcel Bozzuffi as Rene
- Hugh Millais as Marcel
- Cathryn Harrison as Susannah
- John Morley as Old Man
- Barbara Baxley as voice on telephone (uncredited)

== Themes and interpretations ==
The film's loose narrative structure and ambiguities have led to numerous readings of it from film scholars. Joe McElhaney suggests in A Companion to Robert Altman that the majority of film critics and scholars have tended to note that Altman's 3 Women (1977) was inspired directly by Ingmar Bergman's Persona (1966), but, according to McElhaney, Altman himself claimed to have been more influenced by the film when writing and directing Images five years prior. In a retrospective interview, Altman attested to this, saying: "What I see becomes personal, so I am as involved in the fabric of those films [with smaller casts] as I am in the others. The difference between those films with many, many characters and small films like Images and 3 Women is just the size of the canvas. Some are small paintings, whereas others are big, broad murals."

Filmmaker Louis Lombardo has read the character of Cathryn as a stand-in figure for Altman himself, and the film thus an exploration of the multi-dimensional creative process. In 1982's American Skeptic: Robert Altman's Genre-Commentary Films by Norman Kagan, he cites the film as an "anti-genre exploration of what might be called the theme of madness. This genre includes such critically revered films as Psycho, Repulsion, and Persona." Writer Frank Caso identified themes of the film as including obsession, schizophrenia and personality disorder, and linked the film to Altman's earlier film That Cold Day in the Park (1969) and his later 3 Women, declaring them a trilogy.

== Production ==
=== Development ===
Director Altman, who had begun to write the project in the 1960s, had said that he wanted to make a film similar to the work of Joseph Losey, whose films he admired. According to Susannah York, the shoot was loose in form as well as collaborative, and the cast would meet with Altman over dinner each night to discuss the scenes of the upcoming day: "It was quite a bare script originally," said York. "Certainly I began to have very strong ideas about Cathryn. Cathryn and I seemed to be becoming one in many respects. But Bob drew from all of us, he wanted from us, actors love that, and we all responded. There was never any doubt that he was a master director, the master writer of the story, though he didn't necessarily put pen to paper during all those sessions."

=== Casting ===
Altman initially considered several actresses for the lead role, including Vanessa Redgrave, Faye Dunaway, and Julie Christie. However, after seeing Susannah York's performance in Jane Eyre (1970), Altman sought her for the part. After Altman revised the screenplay, York accepted the role but nearly backed out after discovering that she was pregnant. In order to conceal her pregnancy during the shoot, she was dressed in loose-fitting clothing.

The characters' names in the film are the inverses of the real-life names of the actors playing their counterparts: For example, the protagonist Cathryn (played by Susannah York) shares the name of actress Cathryn Harrison, who likewise plays a character named Susannah.

=== Filming ===
Images was shot at Ardmore Studios and at a country home in County Wicklow, Ireland, between October and December 1971. According to a piece published by Variety in December 1969 while the film was in pre-production, Altman had intended to shoot the film in North America, specifically in Vancouver, British Columbia, Canada.

== Release ==
Images premiered at the Cannes Film Festival on May 9, 1972. It was released theatrically in the United Kingdom by Hemdale, opening in London on October 19, 1972. The film was distributed by Columbia Pictures in the United States, premiering in New York City on December 18, 1972. The film's theatrical runs in both countries were short-lived; Hemdale reportedly pulled its advertising campaign from circulation in the United Kingdom, and its distribution in the United States was minimal. In an interview with Variety, Altman lambasted Hemdale for what he saw as their failure to properly promote the film, and criticized the company's head, John Daley.

=== Home media ===
In 2003, Metro-Goldwyn-Mayer issued Images on DVD in North America, featuring a documentary short and partial audio commentary with Altman. In 2018, Arrow Films issued a restored version of the film on Blu-ray in the United States and United Kingdom under their Arrow Academy label.

== Reception ==
=== Critical response ===
The film received mixed reviews from critics; Roger Ebert gave Images three stars out of four, recommending it to fans of Altman's filmography but also writing that it "inspires admiration rather than involvement. It's a technical success but not quite an emotional one." Gene Siskel also gave the film three stars out of four, praising the "extraordinary photography" and John Williams' "nicely disturbing score," although he found Altman's technique of mixing fantasy and reality "repetitious when extended for nearly two hours." Howard Thompson of The New York Times gave the film a negative review, writing: "As for why Robert Altman, the brilliant director of the comedy, M*A*S*H, elected to write and direct this mish-mash, that's his own business. It just doesn't work." Charles Champlin of the Los Angeles Times wrote, "'Images' is an entertainment, with no solemn claims to be seen as a metaphor for our troubled but laugh-provoking times, and it entertains in a fine, shuddery fashion. Pauline Kael of The New Yorker was negative, writing: "To be effective, the movie needs to draw us in to identify with Susannah York's hallucinations, but the cold shine of the surfaces doesn't do it ... This is a psychological thriller with no psychological content, so there's no suspense and the climax has no power."

Michael Scheinfeld in TV Guide gave the film a positive assessment, writing: "Spectacularly filmed on location in Ireland, the country landscapes become an intricate part of the psychological puzzle, as Altman juxtaposes images such as the "real" Cathryn standing on top of an enormous hill and looking down at "herself;" blood dripping onto a carpet that dissolves into the rippling waves in a river; and mysterious shots of horses, clouds, and waterfalls that echo the voice-over narration of Cathryn's children's story "In Search of Unicorns" (which was actually written by Susannah York). York gives a sensational performance..." Variety also published a favorable review of the film, praising York's performance: "[She has] the intensity and innocence marked by strain as well as sensual underpinnings, and brings off the final denouement with restraint and potency."

John Simon wrote that the film "shows Robert Altman at his most trivial".

=== Accolades ===
Award	Date of ceremony	Category	Recipient(s)	Result	Ref(s)
Academy Awards	March 27, 1973	Best Original Score	John Williams	Nominated	
British Academy Film Awards	1973	Best Cinematography	Vilmos Zsigmond	Nominated	
Cannes Film Festival	May 4 – 19, 1972	Best Actress	Susannah York	Won	
Golden Globe Awards	January 28, 1973	Best English-Language Foreign Film	Robert Altman	Nominated	
New York Film Critics Circle	January 3, 1973	Best Actress	Susannah York	9th Place	
Writers Guild of America Awards	March 16, 1973	Best Original Screenplay	Robert Altman	Nominated	

== See also ==
- Mental disorders in film
- Surrealism

== Sources ==
- Caso, Frank (2015). "Strange Interlude". Robert Altman: In the American Grain. Reaktion Books. ISBN 978-1780235523.
- Cook, David A. (2002). Lost Illusions: American Cinema in the Shadow of Watergate and Vietnam, 1970–1979. History of the American Cinema. Berkeley, California: University of California Press. ISBN 978-0-520-23265-5. OCLC 608881348.
- Kagan, Norman (1982). American Skeptic: Robert Altman's Genre-Commentary Films. Ann Arbor, Michigan: Pierian Press. ISBN 978-0-876-50144-3.
- McElhaney, Rob (2015). "Floating Above the Awful Abyss". In Danks, Adrian (ed.). A Companion to Robert Altman. Wiley Blackwell Companions to Film Directors. London, England: John Wiley & Sons, Inc. ISBN 978-1-118-28890-0. OCLC 899114094.
- McGilligan, Patrick (1989). Robert Altman: Jumping Off the Cliff. New York City, New York: St. Martins Press. ISBN 978-0-312-02636-3. OCLC 230990555.
- Simon, John (1982). Reverse Angle A Decade of American films. New York City, New York: Clarkson N. Potter, Inc. ISBN 978-0-517-54471-6.
- Sterritt, David, ed. (2000). Robert Altman: Interviews. Jackson, Mississippi: University of Mississippi Press. ISBN 978-1-57806-186-0. OCLC 925249746.
