= List of accolades received by Nashville =

Nashville received numerous awards and nominations from various critical organizations, including major institutions such as the Academy Awards, Golden Globes, and British Academy Film Awards, as well as regional critical associations. The film was nominated for a total of 11 Golden Globe nominations, to date the most ever received by one film. It also received four Golden Globe nominations in a single acting category; this was and remains unprecedented for major film award shows.

It won a BAFTA Film Award for Best Sound Track. Altman won for best director from: Cartagena Film Festival; Kansas City Film Critics Circle Awards; National Board of Review; National Society of Film Critics Awards; and the New York Film Critics Circle Awards. Lily Tomlin was awarded the New York Film Critics Circle Award for Best Supporting Actress.

== Accolades ==
Awards	Date of ceremony	Category	Recipient(s)	Result	Ref.
Academy Awards	March 29, 1976	Best Picture	Robert Altman	Nominated	
Academy Awards	March 29, 1976	Best Director	Robert Altman	Nominated	
Academy Awards	March 29, 1976	Best Supporting Actress	Ronee Blakley	Nominated	
Academy Awards	March 29, 1976	Best Supporting Actress	Lily Tomlin	Nominated	
Academy Awards	March 29, 1976	Best Original Song	"I'm Easy" (Keith Carradine)	Won	
American Film Institute	June 20, 2007	100 Years...100 Movies	Nashville	No. 59	
American Film Institute	June 22, 2004	100 Years...100 Songs	"I'm Easy" (Keith Carradine)	No. 81	
Bodil Awards	March 25, 1977	Best Non-European Film	Nashville	Won	
British Academy Film Awards	1976	Best Screenplay	Joan Tewkesbury	Nominated	
British Academy Film Awards	1976	Best Actress in a Supporting Role	Ronee Blakley	Nominated	
British Academy Film Awards	1976	Best Actress in a Supporting Role	Gwen Welles	Nominated	
British Academy Film Awards	1976	Most Promising Newcomer to Leading Film Roles	Lily Tomlin	Nominated	
British Academy Film Awards	1976	Best Sound	William A. Sawyer, James Webb, Chris McLaughlin, and Richard Portman	Won	
César Awards	April 3, 1976	Best Foreign Film	Nashville	Nominated	
David di Donatello Awards	1976	Best Foreign Film	Nashville	Won	
Golden Globes	January 24, 1976	Best Motion Picture – Drama	Nashville	Nominated	
Golden Globes	January 24, 1976	Best Director	Robert Altman	Nominated	
Golden Globes	January 24, 1976	Best Screenplay	Joan Tewkesbury	Nominated	
Golden Globes	January 24, 1976	Best Supporting Actor	Henry Gibson	Nominated	
Golden Globes	January 24, 1976	Best Supporting Actress	Ronee Blakley	Nominated	
Golden Globes	January 24, 1976	Best Supporting Actress	Geraldine Chaplin	Nominated	
Golden Globes	January 24, 1976	Best Supporting Actress	Barbara Harris	Nominated	
Golden Globes	January 24, 1976	Best Supporting Actress	Lily Tomlin	Nominated	
Golden Globes	January 24, 1976	Best Original Song	"I'm Easy" (Keith Carradine)	Won	
Golden Globes	January 24, 1976	Best Acting Debut in a Motion Picture (Female)	Ronee Blakley	Nominated	
Golden Globes	January 24, 1976	Best Acting Debut in a Motion Picture (Female)	Lily Tomlin	Nominated	
Grammy Awards	February 28, 1976	Best Score Soundtrack for Visual Media	Richard Baskin, Karen Black, Ronee Blakley, Keith Carradine, Henry Gibson, Ben Raleigh, and Richard Reicheg	Nominated	
Kansas City Film Critics Circle Awards	1976	Best Film	Nashville	Won	
Kansas City Film Critics Circle Awards	1976	Best Supporting Actress	Lily Tomlin	Won	
Kansas City Film Critics Circle Awards	1976	Best Director	Robert Altman	Won	
Los Angeles Film Critics Association	1976	Best Screenplay	Joan Tewkesbury	Won	
National Board of Review	December 23, 1976	Best Film	Nashville	Tied (Note: Tied with Barry Lyndon.)	
National Board of Review	December 23, 1976	Best Director	Robert Altman	Tied (Note: Tied with Stanley Kubrick for Barry Lyndon.)	
National Board of Review	December 23, 1976	Best Supporting Actress	Ronee Blakley	Won	
National Board of Review	December 23, 1976	Top Ten Films	Nashville	Won	
National Society of Film Critics	December 29, 1975	Best Film	Nashville	Won	
National Society of Film Critics	December 29, 1975	Best Supporting Actor	Henry Gibson	Won	
National Society of Film Critics	December 29, 1975	Best Supporting Actress	Lily Tomlin	Won	
National Society of Film Critics	December 29, 1975	Best Director	Robert Altman	Won	
New York Film Critics Circle Awards	January 25, 1976	Best Film	Nashville	Won	
New York Film Critics Circle Awards	January 25, 1976	Best Director	Robert Altman	Won	
New York Film Critics Circle Awards	January 25, 1976	Best Supporting Actress	Lily Tomlin	Won	
New York Film Critics Circle Awards	January 25, 1976	Best Supporting Actor	Henry Gibson	Nominated	

== Sources ==
- Emery, Robert J. (2003). The Directors: Take Three. New York: Simon & Schuster. ISBN 978-1-621-53115-9.
