= National Lampoon's Movie Madness =

- Theatrical release poster
- Directed by: Bob Giraldi; Henry Jaglom
- Written by: Tod Carroll; Gerald Sussman; Shary Flenniken; Pat Mephitis; Ellis Weiner
- Produced by: Matty Simmons
- Starring: Robby Benson; Richard Widmark; Diane Lane; Candy Clark; Christopher Lloyd; Peter Riegert; Ann Dusenberry
- Cinematography: Charles Correll; Tak Fujimoto
- Edited by: James Coblentz
- Music by: Andy Stein
- Production company: Matty Simmons Productions
- Distributed by: MGM/United Artists Distribution and Marketing
- Release date: April 23, 1982
- Running time: 89 minutes
- Country: United States
- Language: English
- Box office: $63,405

National Lampoon's Movie Madness is a 1982 American comedy film produced by National Lampoon as the second film from the magazine. The film was originally produced under the title National Lampoon Goes to the Movies; completed in 1981, the film was not released until 1982, and was reedited and retitled as Movie Madness.

Movie Madness consists of three short segments which satirize personal growth films, glossy soap operas, and police stories. The first two segments of the film, Growing Yourself and Success Wanters, were directed by Bob Giraldi, while the film's final segment, Municipalians, was directed by Henry Jaglom, and featuring Julie Kavner's first film appearance. Its title song, "Going to the Movies", was sung by Dr. John.

The film was a critical and commercial failure.

== Cast ==
=== Growing Yourself ===
Growing Yourself has a confused family man who throws his wife out of the house in order for him to "grow" a new path in life and raise his four children on his own.

- Peter Riegert as Jason Cooper
- Diane Lane as Liza
- Candy Clark as Susan Cooper
- Teresa Ganzel as Diana
- Schnootie Neff as Jennifer Cooper
- Andy Shakman as Josh Cooper
- Tamar Howard as Judy Cooper
- Ina Fried as Jeffrey Cooper
- Trinidad Silva as Carlos
- John Lawlor as Mr. Haggis
- Nedra Volz as Old Lady

=== Success Wanters ===
In Success Wanters, Dominique Corsaire is a young college graduate determined to succeed in life, who in a few days time lands a job as a stripper, then becomes the mistress to the owner of a margarine company which she inherits when he dies, and is then romanced by a Greek shipping tycoon, and ultimately the US president.

- Ann Dusenberry as Dominique Corsaire
- Robert Culp as Paul Everest
- Titos Vandis as Nixos Naxos
- Bobby Di Cicco as Nicholas Naxos
- Margaret Whitton as First Lady Lousille Fogerty
- Fred Willard as President Robert Fogerty
- Olympia Dukakis as Helena Naxos
- Mary Woronov as Joyce, The Secretary
- Dick Miller as Dr. Hans Kleiner

=== Municipalians ===
Municipalians includes a naive rookie Los Angeles policeman paired with a cynical veteran of the force to catch an inept serial killer.

- Robby Benson as Officer Brent Falcone
- Richard Widmark as Stan Nagurski
- Christopher Lloyd as Samuel Starkman
- Barry Diamond as Junkie
- Julie Kavner as Mrs. Falcone (in her first film appearance)
- Elisha Cook as "Mousy"
- Rockne Tarkington as Black Cop

== Production ==
National Lampoon Goes to the Movies was the second film produced by the magazine National Lampoon, after Animal House. National Lampoon Goes to the Movies was conceived as a parody of ten film and television genres. In A Futile and Stupid Gesture, Josh Karp described the project as "a cocaine-fueled fiasco; nobody had a sense of structure or any idea how to write a screenplay." Eventually, the screenplay was trimmed down to four segments: a "divorce movie", a "making-it-big movie", a "cop movie" and a "terrorist movie". Writer Shary Flenniken said of the project, "We cut stuff and boiled it down. It lost its purpose and just became a bunch of crazy crap."

During the filming of "Success Wanters", Bob Giraldi required an "opulent, yet tasty enough bedroom"; Muhammad Ali provided his own for the shoot, and Giraldi also filmed another scene in Ali's dining room. Ali received the standard location fee for the use of his rooms and props.

== Release ==
Flenniken states that a test screening of the film in Rhode Island was met with extremely negative response, and that audience members tore up the seats in the theater to express their dislike of the film. The film was completed in 1981, but not released until two years later.

A fourth segment intended for the film was entirely removed. A disaster movie parody directed by Jaglom, the segment was entitled The Bomb, and starred Kenneth Mars, Allen Garfield, and Marcia Strassman. Steven Bach, United Artists' vice president of production at the time, later wrote that the film's "high commercial promise was dashed when its two directors delivered three good, funny segments and a fourth that rendered the other three pointless because it was of an awfulness that made the whole picture--too short with merely three sections--look unreleasable." Nonetheless, images from the segment appeared in press materials, despite not appearing in the final film.

== Reception ==
National Lampoon's Movie Madness was universally panned by critics and audiences. On the review aggregator website Rotten Tomatoes, 0% of 5 critics' reviews are positive, with an average rating of 2.5/10.

Leonard Maltin gave the film a "bomb" rating, describing it as an "incredibly idiotic parody", describing the segments as "each one worse than the next [sic]."

Producer Matty Simmons later said, "Scenes between Peter and Diane in Movie Madness are possibly worth the price of admission but the rest of the movie didn't come off as well."

== Soundtrack ==
There was never an official soundtrack released, but four songs are known for appearing in the film.

1. "Going to the Movies" by Dr. John
2. "Growing Yourself" by Don McLean
3. "You Don't Love Me"
4. "Feelings" by New Orleans Nighthawks
