= Thomas Hal Phillips =

American actor

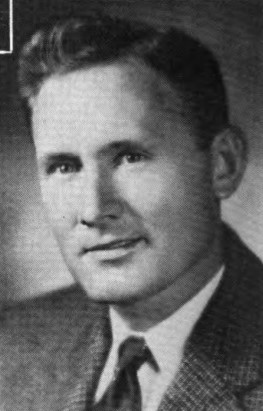
Phillips circa 1964

Thomas Hal Phillips (October 11, 1922 – April 3, 2007) was an American novelist, actor and screenwriter.

== Biography ==
=== Early life ===
Phillips was born on October 11, 1922, on a farm between Corinth and Kossuth in Alcorn County, northeastern Mississippi.

He was one of five sons and a daughter born to William Thomas Phillips, a farmer of English descent, and Ollie Fare Phillips, a schoolteacher with Scottish and Irish ancestry. The family moved in the 1940s to Kossuth so that the children might gain a better education. After schooling in Kossuth, Phillips attended Hinds Junior College.

Phillips served in the United States Navy in the Mediterranean during World War II, after obtaining a degree in social science from Mississippi State University in 1943.

After the war, he used the G.I. Bill to finance a master's degree in writing at the University of Alabama, which resulted in a thesis that later became his first novel, The Bitterweed Path. His adviser was Hudson Strode and the thesis won Phillips a Julius Rosenwald Fellowship in 1947 and the Eugene F. Saxton Award in 1948.

Upon completion of his degree in 1948, Phillips taught for two years at Southern Methodist University in Dallas, Texas. He was able to study in France in 1950 when he was awarded a Fulbright Fellowship.

=== Writing ===
Phillips's first novel – The Bitterweed Path – was first published in hardback in 1950 by Rinehart & Company and was advertised, at the time, as "something new in the literature dealing with man's love for man ... in a period when even psychologists knew little of such matters, and people in small towns knew nothing." The book depicts the struggles of two gay men in the Southern United States at the turn of the 20th century, and how an unconventional love triangle involving these two men, and one of their fathers, impacts their three marriages in small-town, Deep South. The book's theme was notable in an era of repression, and even more so for coming from a particularly repressive state.

Phillips, for whom Corinth-based writer Henry Dalton was a mentor, was awarded a Guggenheim Fellowship for work in fiction in 1953 and again in 1956. His next four books, including another – Kangaroo Hollow – that had a queer theme, were less successful than the first, even though they were well received by literary critics. These literary efforts had been in part subsidised by his investment in his brother Frank's trucking business.

By the late 1950s, he had given up writing novels and did not return to the field until 2002, when Red Midnight was published.

=== Politics ===
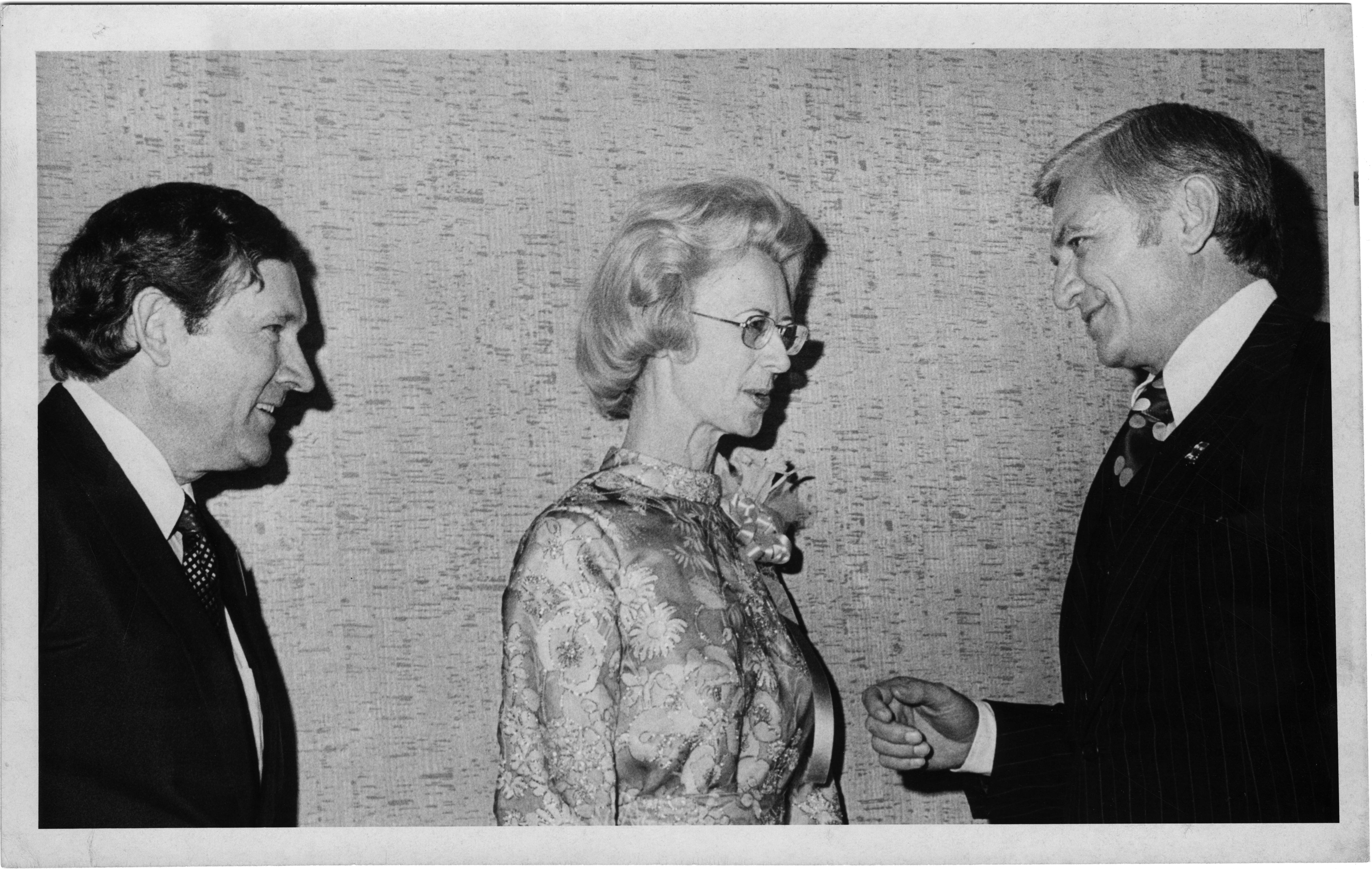
Phillips (left) with Mississippi Lieutenant Governor Evelyn Gandy and Governor Cliff Finch

Around 1958–1960, (Note: Sources give different years for his appointment to the Mississippi Public Service Commission.) Phillips was appointed to the Mississippi Public Service Commission to fill the vacancy created by the resignation of his younger brother, attorney Rubel Phillips. He resigned that post in 1963 so that he could help Rubel in what proved to be an unsuccessful Republican gubernatorial campaign. Phillips managed that campaign and another unsuccessful attempt by Rubel in 1967. However, Jan Stuart says that Thomas wrote speeches and literature for Rubel but was himself a "dyed-in-the-wool" Democrat:

To the young Tom, Franklin Delano Roosevelt was God. He would later admire, if not exalt, JFK, Jimmy Carter and, despite the blotch of scandal and impeachment, William Jefferson Clinton.

=== Film and later life ===
The film rights to Phillips's 1955 novel The Loved and the Unloved were sold and in the 1960s, he began working with Hollywood director Robert Altman. He contributed in various capacities to films such as Thieves Like Us (1974, associate producer), The Autobiography of Miss Jane Pittman (not an Altman film) and Nashville.

He was a consultant for Ode to Billy Joe in 1976, when he was the first chairman of the Mississippi Film Commission.

Phillips, who never married, spent much of his post-military life living alternately between California and Corinth, where he usually resided at the Phillips Brothers Truck Stop that he and Frank had opened in 1960. He died on April 3, 2007, in Kossuth, aged 84.

== Works ==
=== Books ===
Phillips wrote six novels:

- The Bitterweed Path (1950)
- The Golden Lie (1951)
- Search for a Hero (1952)
- Kangaroo Hollow (1954), published only in the UK until 2000
- The Loved and the Unloved (1955)
- Red Midnight (2002)

=== Selected filmography ===
- Tarzan's Fight for Life (1958)
- California Split (1974)
- Thieves Like Us (1974; associate producer)
- Nashville (1975; consultant and voice actor)
- Buffalo Bill and the Indians, or Sitting Bull's History Lesson (1976)
- Ode to Billy Joe (1976; consultant)
- Nightmare in Badham County (1976; actor)
- The Brain Machine (1977; writer, producer and actor)
- Roll of Thunder, Hear My Cry (1978; screenwriter and actor)
- Barn Burning (1980; actor)
- O.C. and Stiggs (1987; actor)
- Matewan (1987; actor)
- Cookie's Fortune (1999)

=== Short stories ===
Phillips's short stories include:

- "A Touch of Earth", published in the Southwest Review of 1949 and subsequently in the Best American Short Stories of 1949 collection
- "The Shadow of an Arm", published in the Virginia Quarterly Review, 1950, was a winner in the 1951 O. Henry Awards
- "Lone Bridge", published in the Southwest Review of 1951 and subsequently in the Best American Short Stories of 1949 collection
- "Mostly in the Fields", published in the Virginia Quarterly Review, 1951 and subsequently used as a part of Search for a Hero
