= Lawrence Hauben =

American screenwriter (1931–1985)

Lawrence Hauben

Lawrence Alan Hauben (3 March 1931 – 22 December 1985) was an American actor and screenwriter. Born in New York, he won the Academy Award for Best Adapted Screenplay along with Bo Goldman for One Flew Over the Cuckoo's Nest (1975) at the 48th Academy Awards. He also won a Golden Globe and a Writers Guild of America Award.

He had a small role as a car salesman in Point Blank (1967). In 1971, he released a documentary film, Venus, about his brief relationship with actress Sally Kellerman.

He died of cancer on 22 December 1985, in Santa Barbara, California at the age of 54.

== Awards ==
| Award | Category | Result | Year | Notes |
|---|---|---|---|---|
| Academy Awards | Best Adapted Screenplay | Won | 1976 | with Bo Goldman |
| Golden Globe Awards | Best Screenplay | Won | 1976 | with Bo Goldman |
| Writers Guild of America Awards | Best Adapted Screenplay | Won | 1976 | with Bo Goldman |
| British Academy Film Awards | Best Screenplay | Nominated | 1976 | with Bo Goldman |
