= Friends & Lovers (1999 film) =

1999 film

- Directed by: George Haas
- Written by: George Haas
- Story by: Neill Barry; George Haas
- Produced by: Josi W. Konski
- Starring: Stephen Baldwin; Danny Nucci; George Newbern; Alison Eastwood; Claudia Schiffer; Suzanne Cryer; David Rasche; Neill Barry; Leon; Ann Magnuson; Robert Downey Jr.
- Cinematography: Carlos Montaner
- Edited by: Barry B. Leirer
- Music by: Emilio Kauderer
- Production company: Laguna Entertainment
- Distributed by: Lions Gate Films
- Release date: April 16, 1999
- Running time: 103 minutes
- Country: United States
- Language: English
- Box office: $33,543

Friends & Lovers is a 1999 American romantic-drama film directed and co-written by George Haas about a group of twentysomethings on a ski trip. It stars Stephen Baldwin, Claudia Schiffer and Robert Downey Jr.

== Plot ==
As Christmas season approaches, Ian is invited by his father, Richie, to join him for a skiing holiday in Park City, Utah. Ian persuades several of his friends to come along. There is Jon, who brings along his German girlfriend, Carla, but has competition for her from a German ski instructor, Hans. Another friend, David, is gay and wants to lose his virginity. Keaton discovers his sister Jane is pregnant and has no plans to tell the man who might be the father. Keaton also has issues with his friend, Lisa, who wants their relationship to become romantic.

== Cast ==
- Stephen Baldwin as Jon
- Danny Nucci as Dave
- George Newbern as Ian Wickham
- Alison Eastwood as Lisa
- Claudia Schiffer as Carla
- Robert Downey Jr. as Hans
- Neill Barry as Keaton McCarthy
- Suzanne Cryer as Jane McCarthy
- David Rasche as Richard "Richie" Wickham
- Ann Magnuson as Katherine
- Leon as Manny

== Critical reaction ==
The film has overwhelmingly negative reviews. Rotten Tomatoes reported that 7% of critics gave positive reviews based on 15 reviews (1 "Fresh", 14 "Rotten") with an average score of 2.2/10, while Roger Ebert considered it not just an example of a bad film, giving it a half star, but incompetent filmmaking, going so far as to suggest in his oral review that it could be shown in film class as an example of what not to do.

== Soundtrack ==
The soundtrack to Friends & Lovers was released on April 20, 1999.

No.	Title	Artist	Length
1.	"Friends and Lovers"	Ali Olmo	3:34
2.	"Too Shy"	Mike Riojas	2:24
3.	"Can't Keep Still"	Mike Riojas	2:48
4.	"Stuck in the Middle"	Orphan	4:08
5.	"Anything for You"	Ali Olmo	3:26
6.	"You Belong to the Moon"	Orphan	3:41
7.	"Someone Like You"	Mike Riojas	2:58
8.	"Father and Son"	Peter Tomashek	2:39
9.	"Jacuzzi"	Peter Tomashek	2:24
10.	"David, and Manny"	Peter Tomashek	1:24
11.	"Hallways and Stairs"	Peter Tomashek	1:34
12.	"Meditation"	Peter Tomashek	1:14
13.	"Hans' Theme"	Peter Tomashek	0:47
14.	"Getting Ready"	Peter Tomashek	2:33
15.	"Keaton and Jane"	Peter Tomashek	2:20
16.	"Bedroom Bug"	Peter Tomashek	1:13
17.	"Country Motel"	Peter Tomashek	1:20
18.	"Everything 'Bout Sex"	Peter Tomashek	1:19
19.	"Morning Confessions"	Peter Tomashek	4:02
20.	"Pointed Head"	Peter Tomashek	0:59
Total length:			47:20
