= O.C. and Stiggs =

1987 film directed by Robert Altman

- Directed by: Robert Altman
- Screenplay by: Donald Cantrell; Ted Mann
- Story by: Tod Carroll; Ted Mann
- Produced by: Robert Altman; Peter Newman
- Starring: Daniel H. Jenkins; Neill Barry; Paul Dooley; Jane Curtin; Martin Mull; Dennis Hopper; Ray Walston
- Cinematography: Pierre Mignot
- Edited by: Elizabeth Kling
- Music by: King Sunny Adé
- Production companies: Lewis Allen/Peter Newman Productions; Metro-Goldwyn-Mayer
- Distributed by: MGM/UA Communications Co.
- Release date: October 9, 1987
- Running time: 109 minutes
- Country: United States
- Language: English
- Budget: $7 million
- Box office: $29,815

O.C. and Stiggs is a 1987 American teen comedy film directed by Robert Altman, based on two characters that were originally featured in a series of stories published in National Lampoon magazine. The film stars Daniel H. Jenkins and Neill Barry as the title characters. Other members of the cast include Paul Dooley, Jane Curtin, Martin Mull, Dennis Hopper, Ray Walston, Louis Nye, Melvin Van Peebles, Tina Louise, Cynthia Nixon, Jon Cryer, Thomas Hal Phillips and Bob Uecker.

The film, a raunchy teen comedy described by the British Film Institute as "probably Altman's least successful film", was shot in 1983, but not released until long after post-production was completed (copyrighted in 1985). MGM shelved it for a couple of years, finally giving it a limited theatrical release in 1987 and 1988.

== Plot ==
Oliver Cromwell Oglivie (also known as "O.C.") and Mark Stiggs are two ne'er-do-well, middle-class Phoenix, Arizona high school students. Disgusted with what they see as an omnipresent culture of vulgar and vapid suburban consumerism, they spend their days slacking off and committing pranks and outright crimes victimizing their nemeses, the Schwab family. The patriarch of the Schwab family, Randall Schwab, is a wealthy regional insurance salesman responsible for the involuntary commitment of O.C.'s grandfather into a group home. An extreme social conservative, Randall is blinded by greed, ideology, and plain stupidity to his wife Elinore's chronic alcoholism, his daughter Lenore's complicated relationship with business associate Frankie Tang, and the stunted emotional maturation of his son Randall Jr.

The majority of the film is presented as a frame story, narrated by O.C. and Stiggs to the president of Gabon Omar Bongo. In it, they loosely retell the story of their ultimate revenge against the Schwab clan, which they had to accomplish before the summer's end forced O.C.'s grandfather to relinquish custody of O.C. to out-of-state relatives. O.C. and Stiggs' first major plan is to ruin Lenore and Frankie's wedding. They acquire an Uzi from deranged Vietnam veteran Sponson and modify a barely-functioning Studebaker Champion into an irregular, hydraulically-suspended car they call the "Gila Monster". Crashing the wedding, they convince Randall Jr. to fire the gun wildly into the wedding presents, cake, and a chandelier. O.C. strikes up a romantic friendship with fellow high school student Michelle.

O.C. and Stiggs' next plot involves the participation of an African pop band King Sunny Adé and His African Beats; the two, along with their friend Barney, raft and walk their way to a Mexican fiesta, where they hire Adé (and also find the time to terrorize their drama teacher Garth for his homosexuality). Exhausted by his relentless commitment to juvenile pranks and stunts, Michelle stops seeing O.C. Later, O.C. and Stiggs connect with women's clothing magnate Pat Colletti, to whom they give marketing advice for his latest slumping fashion line. After finding their friend and drinking buddy Wino Bob (who had participated in other pranks targeting the Schwabs) dead, the two resolve to avenge the Schwabs' supposed abuse of the man. They sabotage a kitschy dinner theater performance (directed by Garth) which the Schwabs are attending by substituting Adé's band for the performers. The Schwabs convulse in horror at the unfamiliar music, which is otherwise warmly received.

O.C. and Stiggs finally launch their master plan of revenge against the Schwabs. They infiltrate the Schwab family home while the Schwabs are away and turn it into a homeless shelter. In the process, they also discover an elaborate doomsday bunker underneath the house, filled with guns, fireworks, and videotapes featuring the political messages of ultraconservative politician Hal Phillip Walker. When the Schwabs return, chaos breaks out as O.C. and Stiggs engage in an underground gunfight with Randall. They are saved by Sponson, who rescues them by helicopter, grabbing Randall and dropping him in a lake in the process. O.C. is happily reunited with Michelle, and the two retire to her bedroom.

At the end of the summer, Colletti informs O.C. and Stiggs that his fashion line has become wildly successful and pays them the first in a series of large royalty checks, which the two use to hire a 24-hour nurse for O.C.'s grandfather (allowing O.C. to remain in Phoenix). O.C. and Stiggs then drive the Gila Monster triumphantly through the streets of suburban Phoenix.

== Cast ==
- Daniel H. Jenkins as O.C. (Oliver Cromwell Oglivie)
- Neill Barry as Mark Stiggs
- Jane Curtin as Elinore Schwab
- Paul Dooley as Randall Schwab
- Jon Cryer as Randall Schwab, Jr.
- Laura Urstein as Lenore Schwab
- Victor Ho as Frankie Tang
- Ray Walston as Gramps
- Donald May as Jack Stiggs
- Carla Borelli as Stella Stiggs
- Stephanie Elfrink as Missie Stiggs
- Amanda Hull as Debbie Stiggs
- James Gilsenan as Barney Beaugereaux
- Tina Louise as Florence Beaugereaux
- Cynthia Nixon as Michelle
- Greg Wangler as Jefferson Washington
- Dennis Hopper as Sponson
- Alan Autry as Goon
- Louis Nye as Garth Sloan
- Dan Ziskie as Rusty Calloway
- Martin Mull as Pat Coletti
- Melvin van Peebles as Wino Bob
- Tiffany Helm as Charlotte
- Dana Andersen as Robin
- Bob Uecker as himself
- Margery Bond as Mrs. Bunny
- Jeannine Ann Cole as Nancy Pearson
- Nina van Pallandt as Clare Dejavue
- Thomas Hal Phillips as Hal Phillip Walker. Phillips reprised his role from Nashville (1975), also directed by Altman.
- Danny Darst as Schwab Commercial Singer
- Caroline Aaron as Janine
- Gary Guthrie as the KOPA deejay
- Maurice Orozco as Bandido
- Louis Enriques as Promoter
- Frank Sprague as Actor in Play
- Robert Fortier as Wino Jim
- Allan Berne, Bob Reilly, Robert Carter, Richard Thompson, Roy Gunsberg, Wayne Wallace, Robert Ledford, D.C. Warren, Lobo, and Florence White as Winos
- Fred Newman as Bongo Voice
- King Sunny Adé and His African Beats as Themselves

== Production ==
The movie's plot was very loosely based on stories from National Lampoon magazine that were written by Ted Mann and Tod Carroll. O.C. and Stiggs were recurring characters in articles in the magazine, eventually leading up to the entire October 1982 issue being devoted to a fictional first-person account of the story of their summer, "The Utterly Monstrous Mind-Roasting Summer of O.C. and Stiggs". The plotline and main characters of the movie were significantly different from the National Lampoon stories they were based on. Most notably, the original magazine characters were destructive, malevolent teenagers, whereas the main characters of the movie were not inherently destructive, and significant portions of the magazine story were omitted from the movie.

Peter Newman, one of the producers of the film, got interested when he was shown the October '82 issue of National Lampoon (Mann and Carroll had shown up in his office), which he felt was provocative, and his producing partner also agreed, which help get a deal started. The original director in mind after this came together was Mike Nichols, who evidently wanted Eddie Murphy for one of the two leads. However, the many commitments Nichols had on Broadway and abroad did not lead to him making the film. When Newman was socializing with Robert Altman, who had made Come Back to the 5 and Dime, Jimmy Dean, Jimmy Dean (1982) with him, Altman one day decided to direct it. MGM, not wanting Paramount Pictures to do the film (as they had shown initial interest first), green-lighted it in hopes of having a youth hit, complete with having Mann and Carroll's script kept untouched. The film was shot in Phoenix, Arizona, in the later summer of 1983, with Altman trying to keep attention away from executives along with the writers (who Altman banned from the set), where at one point he berated Newman for speaking to a studio executive, as Altman described them as "the enemy". The production proved a wild affair, including an open bar at a hotel chosen by Altman because of its proximity to a racetrack for gambling (with Altman betting with crew members), which he did often; watching dailies of what was shot each day went hand-in-hand with pot-smoking and cocaine use for the production.

Perhaps not surprisingly, Mann detested the final product (which had test screenings in 1984 that MGM also hated), stating "Altman's movie is not an adaptation of my work. The screenplay I wrote with Tod Carroll was not shot. Carroll took his name off because it was not his work. I chose to leave my name on, on the chance it might do me some good. It did not. I consider Altman's film of little interest and believe that the chatter of an ordinary street corner schizo is of equal weight and consequence." Years went by before it was screened at Film Forum from March 18 to March 24 of 1988 that led to a scattered limited release.

== Reception ==
The film received generally lackluster reviews. Janet Maslin of The New York Times, noting the belated release by MGM, called it a rambling film with less of the usual Altman quality but called it "certainly a lively, colorful satire" in terms of American artificiality. In an interview years later for the DVD of the film, Altman made a half-hearted defense of the film, describing it as a satire of teen sex comedies rather than being a straight comedy that the promotions advertised, giving credit to the cast and stating the mutual disagreements between him and the writers (Altman described the film in a different interview as one he made because he hated teenage films so much).

In 2014, Apology magazine published an article detailing the making of the film, and it was subsequently selected for inclusion in the Robert Altman Archives, which is housed at the University of Michigan.

== Legacy ==
Alan Moore's comic characters D.R. and Quinch are a science fiction take on the magazine's O.C. and Stiggs characters.
