= Joey (1986 film) =

1986 American film directed by Joseph Ellison

- VHS cover
- Directed by: Joseph Ellison
- Screenplay by: Joseph Ellison
- Story by: Ellen Hammill
- Produced by: Jeffrey Silver
- Starring: Neill Barry; James Quinn
- Cinematography: Oliver Wood
- Edited by: Christopher Andrews
- Music by: Jim Roberge
- Distributed by: Satori
- Release date: January 31, 1986
- Running time: 97 minutes
- Country: United States
- Language: English

Joey is a 1986 film written and directed by Joseph Ellison, based on a story by Ellen Hammill. The rock and roll movie features songs by Tim Worman and the Polecats, The Ramones and Electric Light Orchestra and performances by the Ad-Libs, the Silhouettes, Screamin' Jay Hawkins and others.

== Plot ==
Joey King Sr. (James Quinn) was part of a successful doo wop singing group in the 1950s and now works at a gas station and is a borderline alcoholic. His son, Joey Jr. (Neill Barry) is a Heavy Metal lead guitarist and has started a hard rock band with his teenage friends the laid back John on bass guitar, the nerdy Tony on rhythm guitar and the wisecracking Billy on drums. Joey Sr comes home from work and sings with his son and his son’s band. At first the band and Joey Sr were happy and then Joey Sr asks why they were listening to and learning Doo Wop instead of The Stones or The Who and Tony replied it was the roots of Rock and Roll and Joey Jr reveals to his father that he and his band got an audition for New York Royal Doo Wop show which triggers anger in his father and as Joey Jr is about to leave to go rehearse with his friends elsewhere, he and his father had an argument which Joey Sr takes away his son's guitar and destroys it by smashing it on the amplifier.

Joey Jr runs away and gets into trouble with a gang of college jocks called The Lunatics who attack Joey Jr and destroys Sammy’s Music Store and frame Joey Jr who then runs from the cops. His friends and Janie (Joey Jr’s girlfriend) and her best friend Bonnie (who is the girlfriend of John) are then hanging out at Lonnie’s Restaurant along with the Valley Girls Cindy and Jeanette and all get worried about Joey but are relieved when Joey shows up after fleeing the police and The Lunatics. Joey Jr doesn’t want to go back home and spends the night with his girlfriend Janie after persuasion from his friends. Joey Jr and Janie spend the night together which leads Janie to get grounded.

The next day his bandmates rent Joey Jr an electric guitar for the audition for the Doo Wop show which Joey and his band get the gig after impressing the show’s producer Frankie especially with the Heavy Metal guitar solos on “Unchained Melody” with Vito and the Salutations. Afterwards, Joey Jr and his band perform a concert at the Zoo Lounge and Joey and Janie break up after The Lunatics sent their leader Moe’s girlfriend Renee to flirt with Joey and kisses him after buying her a drink.

The following day, the police show up at the High School Joey Jr attends to arrest Joey and then a chase ensues with Joey outsmarting the police until Joey is stopped by a squad car and is arrested for breaking into the music shop. Joey calls his friends at Lonnie’s explaining why he was arrested and framed and needed $500 for bail. His friends try to get bail money from the fellow patrons and Cindy and Jeanette.

Meanwhile, Bobbie (a female mechanic) revealed to Joey’s father that he was jealous of the son's talent and his drinking snowballed after his wife Cathy’s death. Also, Joey Sr did not want to start his old band back up again as he felt like he was not that good at music anymore. Then after receiving a phone call from the high school principal Mrs O’Neill about Joey Jr’s arrest, Joey Sr takes money out of the cash register to bail his son out of jail and confesses to Bobbie that he blamed himself for what happened to his son and she was right about him being jealous of his son and wanted to make things right with his son and quits drinking right on the spot.

Joey Jr is still in jail when The Lunatics were arrested and they harass an inmate until Joey Jr stands up to The Lunatics who are about to beat him up until the inmates attack The Lunatics as a return favor for Joey giving them his carton of cigarettes as he doesn’t smoke. His bandmates are about to give up until Lonnie suggests calling their boss Frankie to help bail Joey out. At the station, Joey and Janie make up and Frankie bails Joey Jr out while giving the Sgt tickets to the Doo Wop show. The Sgt knew of Joey’s innocence and scolds the two officers who wrongfully arrested Joey. Then Joey Jr and Frankie go to meet Joey Sr at the gas station and are greeted by Bobbie when unbeknownst to them, Joey Sr just missed bailing his son out of jail.

Few minutes later, Bobbie, Joey Jr and Frankie are joined by Joey Sr who apologized to his son for destroying his son’s guitar and their argument a few days earlier and bought him a new red Fender Stratocaster and father and son reconcile and Joey Sr is still reluctant to participate in the Royal New York Doo-Wop Show at Radio City Music Hall but attends to support his son. Meanwhile Frankie persuades Joey Sr to reunite with his old band and both bands play together in joy and happiness to the delight of the crowd.

== Principal cast ==
Actor	Role
Neill Barry	Joey King Jr.
James Quinn	Joey King Sr.
Frank R. Lanziano	Frankie Lanz
Ellen Hammill	Bobbie
John Snyder	Valens
Vicky Cohen	Cindy
Rick Shapiro	Larry

== Critical reception ==
Critic Janet Maslin of The New York Times did not care much for the movie:

Mr. Ellison, best known for directing the horror film Don't Go in the House, has made a different sort of B-movie this time, but the effect is not exactly one of versatility. His style here is plain and perfunctory, so much so that the parts of the plot involving the father seem entirely unrelated to those about the son.
