= I'm Easy (Keith Carradine song) =

Single by Keith Carradine
- B-side: "200 Years (Henry Gibson)"
- Released: May 1976
- Genre: Folk pop
- Length: 2:59
- Label: ABC
- Songwriter: Keith Carradine
- Producer: Richard Baskin

Keith Carradine singles chronology
| "I'm Easy" (1976) | "Mr. Blue" (1978) |

"I'm Easy" is an Academy Award-winning song written and performed by Keith Carradine for the 1975 movie Nashville. Carradine recorded a slightly faster version that became a popular music hit in 1976 in the United States.

== Story ==
The song is a ballad about a lover who is guileless and in awe of the object of his love. The film juxtaposes these lyrics by presenting the song in the context of Tom, a character played by Carradine, who is a manipulative womanizer. In the film, when Tom performs the song at the Exit/In (a real-life Nashville music club where the scene was shot), he dedicates it to "a special someone". Several women in the audience, past, recent and future conquests, believe the song has been written for them.

== Production ==
"I'm Easy" was initially released as an acoustic guitar ballad played by guitarist Ben Benay, with a cello accompaniment. It was re-recorded by Carradine at a slightly higher tempo with the addition of percussion, keyboards and synthesizer accompaniment on Asylum Records. The album was issued late fall 1976.

The song is often mistakenly associated with Jim Croce due to the similarity of Carradine's voice, vocal style and guitar playing. Croce had died in a plane crash two years before Nashville was released.

== Awards and recognition ==
"I'm Easy" won the Academy Award for Best Original Song and the Golden Globe for Best Original Song (Motion Picture). The song peaked at #17 on the Billboard Hot 100 chart, number 10 on the Cash Box Top 100, and spent one week atop the adult contemporary chart. "I'm Easy" was Carradine's only recording to reach the Top 40, and took the #72 slot on the year-end countdown. In 2004 it finished at #81 on AFI's 100 Years...100 Songs survey of the top tunes in American cinema.

== Chart performance ==
=== Weekly charts ===
Ron Nigrini

| Chart (1975/1976) | Peak position |
|---|---|
| Canadian RPM Adult Contemporary | 36 |
| Canadian RPM Top 100 | 22 |

Keith Carradine

| Chart (1976) | Peak position |
|---|---|
| Canadian RPM Top Singles | 72 |
| U.S. Billboard Hot 100 | 17 |
| U.S. Billboard Easy Listening | 1 |
| U.S. Cash Box Top 100 | 10 |

=== Year-end charts ===
| Chart (1976) | Rank |
|---|---|
| U.S. Billboard Hot 100 | 71 |
| U.S. Cash Box | 71 |
| U.S. Billboard Easy Listening | 14 |

== Cover versions ==
The song was covered by Canadian singer Ron Nigrini and released by Attic Records (Canada) in 1975. It became a hit on the Canadian Adult Contemporary chart in the fall of 1975. The song was also covered by American singer/songwriter Dane Donohue, produced by Elliot Mazer and released by Columbia Records in 1976. The song was also covered by Randy Crawford. It was also a hit for Hong Kong singer Teresa Carpio and was on her 1976 album release Songs For You.

== See also ==
- List of number-one adult contemporary singles of 1976 (U.S.)
- List of 1970s one-hit wonders in the United States

== Bibliography ==
- The Billboard Book of Top 40 Hits, Billboard; 9th edition, 2010, ISBN 978-0823085545, 6th Edition
