= 1975 New York Film Critics Circle Awards =

41st New York Film Critics Circle Awards

41st New York Film Critics Circle Awards

January 25, 1976
(announced December 30, 1975)

Best Picture:
Nashville

The 41st New York Film Critics Circle Awards, January 25, 1976, honored the best filmmaking of 1975.

== Winners ==
- Best Actor:
  - Jack Nicholson - One Flew Over the Cuckoo's Nest
  - Runner-up: Al Pacino - Dog Day Afternoon
- Best Actress:
  - Isabelle Adjani - The Story of Adele H. (L'histoire d'Adèle H.)
  - Runner-up: Florinda Bolkan - A Brief Vacation (Una breve vacanza)
- Best Director:
  - Robert Altman - Nashville
  - Runner-up: Stanley Kubrick - Barry Lyndon
- Best Film:
  - Nashville
  - Runner-up: Barry Lyndon
- Best Screenplay:
  - François Truffaut, Jean Gruault and Suzanne Schiffman - The Story of Adele H. (L'histoire d'Adèle H.)
  - Runner-up: Lina Wertmüller - Swept Away (Travolti da un insolito destino nell'azzurro mare d'agosto)
- Best Supporting Actor:
  - Alan Arkin - Hearts of the West
  - Runner-up: Henry Gibson - Nashville
- Best Supporting Actress:
  - Lily Tomlin - Nashville
  - Runner-up: Louise Fletcher - One Flew Over the Cuckoo's Nest
