= 1975 National Society of Film Critics Awards =

Annual US film award ceremony

10th NSFC Awards

December 29, 1975

Best Film:
Nashville

The 10th National Society of Film Critics Awards, given on 29 December 1975, honored the best filmmaking of 1975.

== Winners ==
=== Best Picture ===
- Nashville

=== Best Director ===
- Robert Altman – Nashville

=== Best Actor ===
- Jack Nicholson – One Flew Over the Cuckoo's Nest

=== Best Actress ===
- Isabelle Adjani – The Story of Adele H. (L'histoire d'Adèle H.)

=== Best Supporting Actor ===
- Henry Gibson – Nashville

=== Best Supporting Actress ===
- Lily Tomlin – Nashville

=== Best Screenplay ===
- Robert Towne and Warren Beatty – Shampoo

=== Best Cinematography ===
- John Alcott – Barry Lyndon

=== Special Award ===
- The Magic Flute (Trollflöjten)
