= Neill Barry =

American actor

- Born: November 29, 1965 (age 60); New York City, New York, United States
- Occupations: Actor, screenwriter
- Years active: 1980–present

Neill Barry (born November 29, 1965) is an American film, television and stage actor, as well as an occasional screenwriter.

Barry was born in New York City, New York. He made his acting debut at the age of thirteen in Martin Davidson's film Hero at Large. He co-wrote and starred in the independent film Friends & Lovers, which also starred Robert Downey Jr., Claudia Schiffer and Stephen Baldwin.

Barry portrays Philip Rearden in Atlas Shrugged (2011), the film adaptation of Ayn Rand's novel of the same name.

== Early life ==
Barry is the son of New York playwright P.J. Barry. He is the younger brother of casting director Matthew Barry and actress Nina Barry.

== Selected film and television work ==
=== Film ===
- Hero at Large (1980) - Teenager
- Amityville 3-D (1983) - Jeff
- Old Enough (1984) - Johnny
- O.C. and Stiggs (1985) - Mark Stiggs
- Heat (1986) - Danny DeMarco
- Joey (1986) - Joey
- Fatal Beauty (1987) - Denny Miflin
- Slipping Into Darkness (1988) - Ebin
- She's So Lovely (1998) - Mario
- Show & Tell (1998) - Michael
- Friends & Lovers (1999) - Keaton McCarthy (also co-wrote)
- Atlas Shrugged (2011) - Philip Rearden

=== Television ===
- Spenser: For Hire - (1986) Tony Calone
- Murder, She Wrote - (1992) Richie Floret
- Melrose Place (1996) - Greg Parker
- 7th Heaven (1998) - Louis Dalton Jr.
- CSI: NY (2006) - Salvador Zabo
- Crossing Jordan (2007) - Jack Marshall
- Without a Trace (2007) - Prof. Arrow
- General Hospital: Night Shift (2008) - Will
- Criminal Minds (2009) - Downey
- House M.D. (2011) - Donald

== Broadway stage performances ==
- Almost an Eagle (1982) - Shawn Haley
