= The Story of Adèle H. =

1975 film by François Truffaut

- Theatrical release poster
- French: L'Histoire d'Adèle H.
- Directed by: François Truffaut
- Screenplay by: François Truffaut; Jean Gruault; Suzanne Schiffman; Frances Vernor Guille (Note: Collaboration); Jan Dawson (Note: English adaptation)
- Based on: Le Journal d'Adèle Hugo by Adèle Hugo
- Produced by: Marcel Berbert; Claude Miller
- Starring: Isabelle Adjani; Bruce Robinson; Sylvia Marriott; Joseph Blatchley; Ivry Gitlis
- Cinematography: Nestor Almendros
- Edited by: Yann Dedet; Martine Barraqué; Jean Gargonne; Michèle Neny; Muriel Zeleny
- Music by: Maurice Jaubert
- Production companies: Les Films du Carrosse; Les Productions Artistes Associés
- Distributed by: Les Artistes Associés
- Release date: 8 October 1975 (France)
- Running time: 96 minutes
- Country: France
- Languages: French; English
- Budget: 5 million F
- Box office: 762,644 admissions (France); $1.1 million (US and Canada rentals)

The Story of Adèle H. (French: L'Histoire d'Adèle H.) is a 1975 French historical drama film directed by François Truffaut, and starring Isabelle Adjani, Bruce Robinson, Sylvia Marriott, Joseph Blatchley and Ivry Gitlis. Written by Truffaut, Jean Gruault and Suzanne Schiffman, the film is about Adèle Hugo, the daughter of writer Victor Hugo, whose obsessive unrequited love for a military officer leads to her downfall. The story is based on Adèle Hugo's diaries. Filming took place on location in Guernsey and Senegal.

Adjani received critical acclaim for her performance as Hugo, garnering an Academy Award nomination for Best Actress in a Leading Role, at the time making her the youngest Best Actress nominee ever at age 20. The Story of Adèle H. also won the National Board of Review Award for Best Foreign Language Film, the French Syndicate of Cinema Critics Award for Best Film, and the Cartagena Film Festival Special Critics Award.

== Plot ==
In 1863, in the midst of the American Civil War, British troops are stationed in Halifax, Nova Scotia, carefully checking European passengers disembarking from foreign ships. Adèle Hugo, the second daughter of French writer Victor Hugo, makes it through and takes a carriage into Halifax. Traveling under the pseudonym Miss Lewly, Adèle finds accommodations at a boarding house run by Mr. and Mrs. Saunders.

Adèle finds a notary and inquires about a British officer, Lieutenant Albert Pinson, whom she deeply loves. Adèle later sees Pinson at a bookshop. When she learns that Mr. Saunders will be attending a military dinner which Pinson is likely to attend, Adèle asks him to deliver a love letter announcing her arrival. When Mr. Saunders returns from the dinner, he tells her that he gave Pinson her letter, but he did not open it.

The next day, Adèle writes to her parents, telling them that she must be with her beloved Pinson and that they are planning to marry, but she will wait for their formal consent. She spends her evenings writing in her journal about her life and her love for Pinson. Visiting the boarding house, Pinson demands that Adèle stop following him and leave Halifax, and tells her that her father would never approve their marriage. Adèle tries to persuade Pinson, threatens to expose him and ruin his military career, and even offers him money for his gambling debts, but he remains unmoved.

One night, Adèle follows Pinson to the home of his much older mistress, where she watches them having sex. Undeterred, Adèle continues writing in her journal, and her behavior becomes increasingly erratic. Mr. Whistler, the kind bookseller who provides her with writing paper, shows an interest in her. As she leaves his bookshop, she faints from exhaustion. Mr. Whistler visits her at the boarding house and brings her paper, but she refuses to see him. When Dr. Murdock visits to examine Adèle, he notices one of her letters is addressed to Victor Hugo and informs Mrs. Saunders of the true identity of her boarder.

Victor Hugo sends Adèle a letter informing her of the family's consent to her marriage to Pinson. She shows the letter to Pinson, but he still refuses to marry her. As Adèle's obsession grows stronger, she writes to her parents claiming that she has married Pinson. Upon receiving the news, Victor Hugo posts an announcement of the marriage in his local paper. The news reaches Pinson's colonel. After Pinson writes Victor Hugo to explain that he never will marry Adèle, Hugo writes to his daughter, urging her to return home to Guernsey. Adèle responds to her father's letter with more fantasy, urging her parents to accept Pinson.

Having learned of Adèle's identity, Mr. Whistler offers her a gift of her father's books; she responds in anger and paranoia. She hires a prostitute as a gift for Pinson and later considers hiring a hypnotist to force him to marry her, but realizes that the man is a charlatan. Overcome with despair, she visits the father of Pinson's fiancée and claims that he is married to her and that she is carrying his child. The father ends the engagement. She finds Pinson once more, and he again rebukes her, calling her ridiculous. After leaving the boarding house, Adèle refuses to return to her family despite her father's pleas and her mother's illness; the latter dies shortly afterwards.

In February 1864, Pinson is shipped out to Barbados, and a destitute Adèle follows him. Now married, Pinson learns that Adèle is in Barbados claiming to be his wife. Concerned for her, Pinson searches for her and finds her wandering the streets in rags. When he tries to confront her, Adèle does not acknowledge or recognize him. Helped by a kind former slave, Adèle returns to Paris, where the French Third Republic has been established. Her father places her in an asylum in Saint-Mandé, where she lives for the next 40 years. She gardens, plays the piano and writes in her journal. Adèle Hugo dies in Paris in 1915 at the age of 85.

== Cast ==
- Isabelle Adjani as Adèle Hugo / Adèle Lewly
- Bruce Robinson as Lieutenant Albert Pinson
- Sylvia Marriott as Mrs. Saunders
- Joseph Blatchley as Mr. Whistler, the bookseller
- Ivry Gitlis as the hypnotist
- Louise Bourdet as Victor Hugo's servant
- Cecil de Sausmarez as Mr. Lenoir, a notary
- Ruben Dorey as Mr. Saunders
- Clive Gillingham as Keaton
- Roger Martin as Dr. Murdock
- Mr. White as Colonel White
- Madame Louise as Madame Baa
- Jean-Pierre Leursse as the letter-writer in Barbados
- Edward J. Jackson as O'Brien, the carriage driver (uncredited)
- Carl Hathwell as Hathwell, Lieutenant Pinson's batman (uncredited)
- Raymond Falla, OBE, as Judge Johnstone (uncredited)

François Truffaut has a brief, wordless cameo in the film as an officer Adele mistakes for Pinson in Halifax.

== Production ==
Writing about the film, François Truffaut observed:

In writing the script of L'Enfant sauvage based on the memoirs of Dr. Jean Itard, we discovered, Jean Gruault and myself, the enormous pleasure of writing historical fiction based on real events, without inventing anything and without altering documented facts. If it is difficult to construct an unanimistic intrigue involving a dozen characters whose paths entwine, it is almost as difficult to write an animistic film focusing on a single person. I believe that it was this solitary aspect which attracted me most to this project; having produced love stories involving two and three people, I wanted to attempt to create a passionate experience involving a character where the passion was one-way only.

Truffaut had to get the rights from Jean Hugo, Victor Hugo's direct descendant. He gave his consent after reading a treatment on the condition that Victor Hugo did not appear on screen.

Finance was originally sought from Warner Bros but they turned it down as being too literary. The film was financed by United Artists. The original budget was five million francs so the script was simplified to focus more on Adèle.

Although Truffaut had once promised the role of Adèle to Catherine Deneuve, he decided he wanted a new star to play the lead. He screen-tested Stacey Tendeter, who had co-starred in his 1971 film Two English Girls, but, after seeing Isabelle Adjani's performances in La Gifle (1974) and on stage, he then decided to cast her. At that time, Adjani was under contract as a stage actress to the Comédie-Française, which refused to release her from her contract. There was a legal dispute, but, in the end, Adjani was able to play the part.

=== Filming ===
Filming took place from 8 January to 21 March 1975. Most of the film's exterior scenes were shot on location in Guernsey, Channel Islands, and many of the film extras were well-known locals. Both Raymond Falla (who portrayed Judge Johnstone) and Sir Cecil de Sausmarez (who portrayed Lenoir, the notary) were, at the time of filming, prominent island politicians. Scenes set in Halifax were mainly interiors created in a house in St. Peter Port, Guernsey. No filming took place in Halifax. The scenes set in Barbados were shot on the island of Gorée off the coast of Senegal.

As was his custom, Truffaut fell for his leading lady during the shoot. However, Adjani rebuffed his advances. She did not like to rehearse, and filming in Guernsey was an intense emotional experience for most of the crew. Truffaut later wrote to a friend:

You mention the pleasure I must have directing Isabelle A. It's the opposite of pleasure, it's daily suffering for me, and almost an agony for her. For her profession is her religion, and because of that our shoot is a trial for everyone. It would be too easy to say she is difficult, she is not. She is different from all the women in this profession and since she isn't even 20, add to all this (to her genius, let's not be afraid of words), an unawareness of others and their vulnerability, which creates an unbelievable tension.

The film was shot in both English and French.

== Reception ==
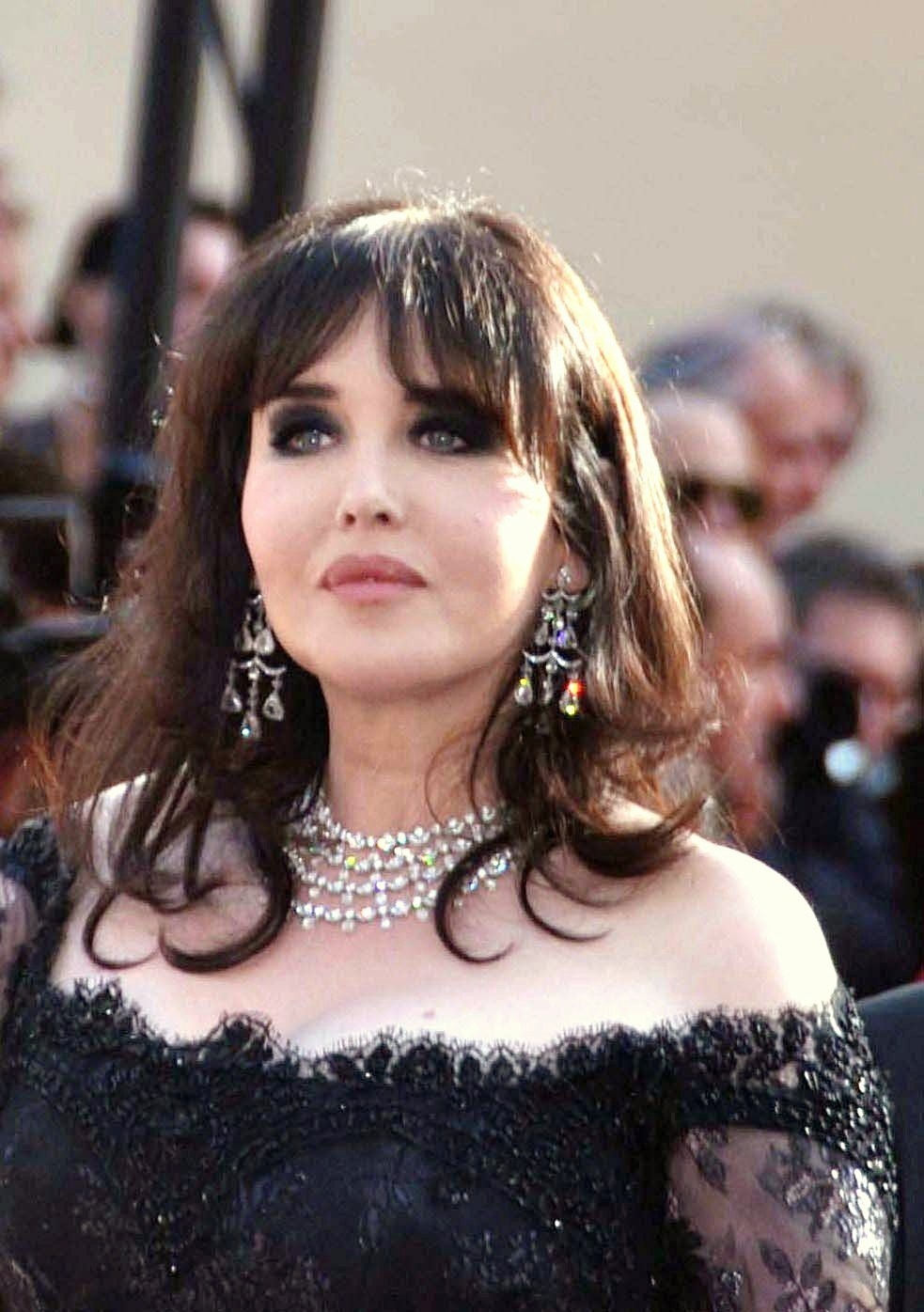
Isabelle Adjani's performance received widespread critical acclaim, earning her a nomination for the Academy Award for Best Actress, making the 20-year-old the youngest-ever Best Actress nominee at the time.

=== Box office ===
The Story of Adèle H. sold 752,160 tickets in France, and was considered a box office disappointment.

=== Critical response ===
In her book When the Lights Go Down, American film critic Pauline Kael gave the film a very positive review:

After a two-year break to read and to write, François Truffaut has come back to moviemaking with new assurance, new elation. The Story of Adèle H. ... is a musical, lilting film with a tidal pull to it.

In his review in the Chicago Sun-Times, Roger Ebert gave the film four stars, calling it "a strange, moody film that belongs very much with the darker side of [Truffaut's] work." Ebert continued:

Truffaut finds a certain nobility in Adèle. He quotes one of the passages in her diaries twice: She writes that she will walk across the ocean to be with her lover. He sees this, not as a declaration of love, but as a statement of a single-mindedness so total that a kind of grandeur creeps into it. Adèle was mad, yes, probably—but she lived her life on such a vast and romantic scale that it's just as well Pinson never married her. He would have been a disappointment.

In his review in The New York Times, Vincent Canby called the film "profoundly beautiful", and Truffaut's "most severe, most romantic meditation upon love." Canby continued:

One of the fascinations of the Truffaut career is in watching the way he circles and explores different aspects of the same subjects that dominate almost all of his films. However, The Story of Adèle H., impeccably photographed by Nestor Almendros (The Wild Child), looks and sounds like no other Truffaut film you've ever seen. ... The colors are deep, rich and often dark, and the soundtrack is full of the noises that one associates with old costume films produced by M-G-M in its great days

On the review aggregator website Rotten Tomatoes, the film holds an approval rating of 93% based on reviews from 29 reviews, with an average score of 8.1/10.

=== Accolades ===
Award	Category	Recipient(s)	Result
Academy Awards	Best Actress	Isabelle Adjani	Nominated
Bambi Awards	Best Film – International	Isabelle Adjani	Won
Cartagena Film Festival	Best Film	François Truffaut	Nominated
Cartagena Film Festival	Best Actress	Isabelle Adjani	Won
Cartagena Film Festival	Special Critics Award	François Truffaut	Won
César Awards	Best Director	François Truffaut	Nominated
César Awards	Best Actress	Isabelle Adjani	Nominated
César Awards	Best Production Design	Jean-Pierre Kohut-Svelko	Nominated
David di Donatello Awards	Best Foreign Actress	Isabelle Adjani	Won (Note: Tied with Glenda Jackson for Hedda)
French Syndicate of Cinema Critics Awards	Best Film	François Truffaut	Won
National Board of Review Awards	Top Foreign Films	The Story of Adele H.	Won
National Board of Review Awards	Best Foreign Language Film	The Story of Adele H.	Won
National Board of Review Awards	Best Actress	Isabelle Adjani	Won
National Society of Film Critics Awards	Best Actress	Isabelle Adjani	Won
New York Film Critics Circle Awards	Best Actress	Isabelle Adjani	Won
New York Film Critics Circle Awards	Best Screenplay	François Truffaut, Jean Gruault and Suzanne Schiffman	Won

== See also ==
- Cinema of France
- List of French-language films
- List of oldest and youngest Academy Award winners and nominees – Youngest nominees for Best Actress in a Leading Role
- Mental disorders in film
