= National Board of Review Awards 1975 =

Annual US film awards ceremony

47th National Board of Review Awards

December 23, 1975

The 47th National Board of Review Awards were announced on December 23, 1975.

== Top 10 films ==
1. Nashville, Barry Lyndon
2. Conduct Unbecoming
3. One Flew Over the Cuckoo's Nest
4. Lies My Father Told Me
5. Dog Day Afternoon
6. The Day of the Locust
7. The Passenger
8. Hearts of the West
9. Farewell, My Lovely
10. Alice Doesn't Live Here Anymore

== Top Foreign Films ==
1. The Story of Adele H.
2. A Brief Vacation
3. Special Section
4. Stavisky
5. Swept Away

== Winners ==
- Best Picture (tie):
  - Barry Lyndon
  - Nashville
- Best Foreign Film:
  - The Story of Adele H.
- Best Actor:
  - Jack Nicholson - One Flew Over the Cuckoo's Nest
- Best Actress:
  - Isabelle Adjani - The Story of Adele H.
- Best Supporting Actor:
  - Charles Durning - Dog Day Afternoon
- Best Supporting Actress:
  - Ronee Blakley - Nashville
- Best Director:
  - Robert Altman - Nashville
  - Stanley Kubrick - Barry Lyndon
- Special Citation:
  - Ingmar Bergman, for outstanding translation of opera to screen, The Magic Flute
