= One Flew Over the Cuckoo's Nest (film) =

1975 American drama film

- Theatrical release poster
- Directed by: Miloš Forman
- Screenplay by: Lawrence Hauben; Bo Goldman
- Based on: One Flew Over the Cuckoo's Nest by Ken Kesey
- Produced by: Saul Zaentz; Michael Douglas
- Starring: Jack Nicholson; Louise Fletcher; William Redfield
- Cinematography: Haskell Wexler
- Edited by: Richard Chew; Lynzee Klingman; Sheldon Kahn
- Music by: Jack Nitzsche
- Production company: Fantasy Films
- Distributed by: United Artists
- Release date: November 19, 1975
- Running time: 135 minutes
- Country: United States
- Language: English
- Budget: $3–4.4 million
- Box office: $163.3 million

One Flew Over the Cuckoo's Nest is a 1975 American psychological comedy-drama film directed by Miloš Forman, based on the 1962 novel of the same name by Ken Kesey. The film stars Jack Nicholson as a new patient at a mental institution and Louise Fletcher as the abusive head nurse. Will Sampson, Danny DeVito, Sydney Lassick, William Redfield, Christopher Lloyd, and Brad Dourif play supporting roles, with the latter two making their feature-film debuts and Sampson having never acted before.

Originally announced in 1962 with Kirk Douglas starring, the film took 13 years to develop. Filming finally began in January 1975 and lasted three months, on location in Salem, Oregon, and the surrounding area, and in Depoe Bay on the north Oregon coast. The producers shot the film in the Oregon State Hospital, an actual psychiatric hospital, which is also the novel's setting. The hospital is still in operation, though the original buildings in the film have been demolished. The film was released on November 19, 1975.

One Flew Over the Cuckoo's Nest received critical acclaim and is considered by critics and audiences to be one of the greatest films ever made. It is the second of three films to win all five major Academy Awards (Best Picture, Best Actor, Best Actress, Best Director, and Best Adapted Screenplay) following It Happened One Night (1934) and preceding 1991's The Silence of the Lambs. It won numerous Golden Globe and BAFTA Awards. In 1993, the film was deemed "culturally, historically, or aesthetically significant" by the United States Library of Congress and selected for preservation in the National Film Registry. Additionally, One Flew Over the Cuckoo's Nest was ranked number 33 on the American Film Institute's updated 100 Years... 100 Movies list in 2007.

== Plot ==
In 1963 Oregon, Randle McMurphy is incarcerated for his statutory rape of a 15-year-old girl and five previous arrests for assault. He feigns mental illness so he can be moved to a mental institution and avoid hard labor at a work farm. The medical ward is dominated by the cold, passive-aggressive Nurse Ratched, who maintains control over the patients through intimidation. Among them are young, anxious, stuttering Billy Bibbit; Charlie Cheswick, who is prone to temper tantrums; delusional, child-like Martini; the articulate and repressed homosexual Dale Harding; belligerent and profane Max Taber; epileptics Jim Sefelt and Bruce Fredrickson; quiet but violent-minded Scanlon; tall, huge, and deaf-mute Euro-Indigenous American Chief Bromden; and several others with chronic conditions.

Ratched sees McMurphy's lively, rebellious presence as a threat to her authority, and she rations the patients' cigarettes and suspends their card-playing privileges. McMurphy bets the other inmates he can escape by hurling a hydrotherapy fountain through a locked window, but unsurprisingly is unable to lift the heavy device. He hijacks a charter bus, picks up his girlfriend Candy, and escapes with several patients to steal a recreational fishing boat, exposing them to the outside world and encouraging them to discover their abilities and find self-confidence.

Returning to the ward, an orderly explains the length of his stay in the mental institution is indefinite, something McMurphy didn't know. Chief, Taber, and McMurphy are the only nonchronic patients who have been involuntarily committed; the others have committed themselves voluntarily, but are too afraid to leave. When Cheswick throws a fit demanding his cigarettes from Ratched, McMurphy starts a fight with the orderlies, and Chief intervenes to help him.

McMurphy, Chief, and Cheswick are sent to the disturbed ward, and Chief reveals to McMurphy he was faking deaf-muteness to avoid interacting with others. The two plan to escape to Canada together. McMurphy is subjected to electroconvulsive therapy and returns to the ward pretending to be brain-damaged before revealing that the treatment has made him even more determined to defeat Ratched. McMurphy and Chief plan a secret Christmas party for their friends after Ratched and the orderlies leave for the night, before making their escape. McMurphy bribes the night orderly, Turkle, to let Candy and her friend Rose into the ward with alcohol for the party. McMurphy and Chief invite Billy to escape with them. Billy refuses, but asks for a "date" with Candy; McMurphy arranges for him to spend a night with her. McMurphy falls asleep, drunk, instead of escaping with Chief.

Ratched arrives in the morning to find most of the patients passed out. Discovering Billy and Candy in bed together, her attempts to embarrass Billy in front of the others fails when Billy overcomes his stutter and stands up to her. She threatens to tell his mother and Billy reverts to stuttering. Ratched has him locked in a separate room as punishment, where he kills himself. McMurphy punches an orderly trying to escape with Chief, and a melee ensues with the other orderlies. Ratched calls for order, but her nonchalant manner enrages McMurphy, who strangles her until he's subdued by the orderlies.

Ratched returns later in a neck brace, speaking weakly, unable to stop Harding from resuming the card games. McMurphy is absent, rumored escaped, but Chief sees McMurphy being returned to his bed that night. He's elated that McMurphy had kept his promise not to escape without him, but discovers McMurphy has been lobotomized. He tearfully embraces McMurphy, then smothers him with a pillow. He rips the heavy hydrotherapy fountain from its base and throws it through the window, as McMurphy had earlier attempted. Chief escapes, with Taber and the other inmates awakening to cheer him on as he runs into the surrounding countryside.

== Cast ==
- Jack Nicholson as Randle Patrick "R.P." McMurphy
- Louise Fletcher as Nurse Mildred Ratched
- Will Sampson as "Chief" Bromden
- William Redfield as Dale Harding
- Brad Dourif as Billy Bibbit
- Sydney Lassick as Charlie Cheswick
- Christopher Lloyd as Max Taber
- Danny DeVito as Martini
- Dean Brooks as Dr. John Spivey
- William Duell as Jim Sefelt
- Vincent Schiavelli as Bruce Frederickson
- Michael Berryman as Ellis
- Alonzo Brown as Attendant Miller
- Mwako Cumbuka as Attendant Warren
- Nathan George as Attendant Washington
- Scatman Crothers as Night Guard Turkle
- Marya Small as Candy
- Louisa Moritz as Rose
- Peter Brocco as Col. Matterson
- Delos V. Smith Jr. as Scanlon
- Josip Elic as Bancini
- Dwight Marfield as Ellsworth
- Phil Roth as Woolsey
- Mimi Sarkisian as Nurse Pilbow
- Ted Markland as Hap Arlich
- Ken Kenny as Beans Garfield
- Kay Lee as Night Supervisor
- Mel Lambert as Harbor Master

== Production ==
=== Development ===
In 1962, Kirk Douglas's company Joel Productions announced that it had acquired the rights to make Broadway stage and film adaptations of One Flew Over the Cuckoo's Nest with Douglas starring as McMurphy in both the play and the film, Dale Wasserman writing the stageplay, and George Roy Hill directing the film based on Wasserman's play. Jack Nicholson had also tried to buy the film rights to the novel, but was outbid by Douglas. Wasserman's 1963–1964 Broadway stage adaptation successfully opened, but Douglas was unable to find a studio willing to make the film with him.

Kirk Douglas hired Miloš Forman to direct after meeting him in Prague during a tour of the Eastern Bloc. Avco-Embassy Pictures optioned the film in 1969, but Forman was prevented from directing the film by the Warsaw Pact invasion of Czechoslovakia and the beginning of the "normalization" period in which the Soviet Union forced Czechoslovakia to reverse most of its Prague Spring liberalization reforms. Forman and Douglas fell completely out of contact after the Czechoslovak StB put Forman under strict surveillance. It also intercepted a copy of the novel Douglas sent to his home in Prague, which meant he was unable to read the book.

Wasserman subsequently sold his film rights to Douglas in 1970, but then delayed the film for several more years with lawsuits. In 1971, Kirk Douglas's son Michael Douglas convinced his father to allow him to produce the film, as he was drawn to the novel's "one man against the system" plot due to his involvement with student activism at the University of California, Santa Barbara. Michael Douglas optioned the film to director Richard Rush, but Rush was unable to secure financing from major studios. In March 1973, Michael Douglas announced a new deal in which he would co-produce the film with Saul Zaentz as the first project of Fantasy Records' new film division.

Zaentz, a voracious reader, felt an affinity with Kesey, so after Hauben's first attempt, he asked Kesey to write the screenplay. Kesey participated in the early stages of script development, but withdrew after creative differences with the producers over casting and narrative point of view; ultimately, he filed suit against the production and won a settlement. Although Kesey was paid for his work, his screenplay from the first-person point of view of Chief Bromden was not used. Instead, Lawrence Hauben and Bo Goldman wrote a new screenplay from a third-person perspective.

Hal Ashby was hired to replace Rush as director in 1973, but he was also replaced by Forman after Forman had successfully fled to the United States. Although Michael Douglas and Zaentz were unaware that Forman had been Kirk Douglas's first choice to direct, they began considering him after Hauben showed them Forman's 1967 Czechoslovak film The Firemen's Ball. Michael Douglas later said that the film "had the sort of qualities we were looking for; it took place in one enclosed situation, with a plethora of unique characters he had the ability to juggle".

Although Forman was suffering from a mental health crisis and refused to leave his Hotel Chelsea room in New York City for months, Douglas and Zaentz sent him a copy of the novel. Although Forman was not aware that the novel was the one which Douglas's father had hired him to direct in the 1960s, he quickly decided that it was "the best material I'd come across in America" and flew to California to discuss the film further with Douglas and Zaentz. They quickly hired Forman because, in Douglas's words, "Unlike the other directors we saw, who kept their cards close to their chest, he went through the script page by page and told us what he would do." Forman wrote in 2012: "To me, [the story] was not just literature, but real life, the life I lived in Czechoslovakia from my birth in 1932 until 1968. The Communist Party was my Nurse Ratched, telling me what I could and could not do; what I was or was not allowed to say; where I was and was not allowed to go; even who I was and was not."

=== Casting ===
Although Kirk Douglas allowed his son to produce the film, he remained interested in playing McMurphy. However, Ashby and Forman felt Kirk Douglas was too old for the role and decided to recast him. This decision would strain relations between Kirk and Michael Douglas for many years, although Michael Douglas claimed it had not been his decision to recast him. Gene Hackman, James Caan, Marlon Brando, and Burt Reynolds were all considered for the role of McMurphy. Ashby wanted 37-year-old Jack Nicholson to play McMurphy, but Douglas was unsure if he was right for the role and Forman's first choice was Reynolds. All four turned down the role, which ultimately went to Nicholson. Nicholson had never played this type of role before. Production was delayed for about six months because of Nicholson's schedule. Douglas later stated in an interview, "[T]hat turned out to be a great blessing; it gave us the chance to get the ensemble right." Nicholson did extensive research for the role and even met patients in a psychiatric ward to watch electroconvulsive shock therapy to prepare for the role.

Danny DeVito was the first to be cast, reprising his role as the patient Martini from the 1971 off-Broadway production. Chief Bromden (who turns out to be the title character), played by Will Sampson, was referred by Mel Lambert (who portrayed the harbormaster in the fishing scene), a used-car dealer Douglas met on an airplane flight when Douglas told him they wanted a "big guy" to play the part. Lambert's father often sold cars to Native American customers, and six months later, Lambert called Douglas to say: "the biggest sonofabitch Indian came in the other day!" Sampson was so large that Nicholson sat in his lap on the small plane Michael Douglas and they flew on after their meeting; Douglas recalled Nicholson repeating, "It's the Chief, man, it's the Chief!"

Jeanne Moreau, Angela Lansbury, Colleen Dewhurst, Geraldine Page, Ellen Burstyn, Anne Bancroft, and Jane Fonda all were considered to portray Nurse Ratched before Lily Tomlin was ultimately cast in the role. However, Forman became interested in recasting Tomlin with Louise Fletcher, who had a supporting role in the film, after viewing her film Thieves Like Us (1974). A mutual acquaintance, casting director Fred Roos, had already mentioned Fletcher's name as a possibility. Even so, four or five meetings across one year were needed for Fletcher to secure the role of Nurse Ratched. Her final audition was late in 1974, with Forman, Zaentz, and Douglas. The day after Christmas, her agent called to say she was expected at the Oregon State Hospital in Salem on January 4 to begin rehearsals. Tomlin subsequently left the film to replace Fletcher in Nashville (1975). In 2016, Fletcher recalled that Nicholson's salary was "enormous", while the rest of the cast worked at or close to scale. She put in 11 weeks, grossing US$10,000 (equivalent to $60,000 in 2025).

Forman also considered Shelley Duvall for the role of Candy; coincidentally, Nicholson, Scatman Crothers (who portrays Turkle), and she all later appeared as part of the main cast of The Shining. Bud Cort was considered for the role of Billy Bibbit before Brad Dourif was cast. Michael Douglas said that he was too young to play McMurphy, but "It did cross my mind that maybe I could play Billy Bibbit. Then Brad Dourif came in for an audition, and I just said, 'Well, that's our Billy.'"

=== Rehearsals ===
Prior to commencement of filming, a week of rehearsals started on January 4, 1975, in Oregon shortly after Nicholson concluded his previous film The Fortune (1975). The cast watched the patients in their daily routine and at group therapy. Jack Nicholson and Louise Fletcher also witnessed electroconvulsive therapy being performed on a patient.

=== Filming ===
Principal photography began on January 13, 1975, and concluded about three months later. The film was shot on location in Salem, Oregon, the surrounding area, and the coastal town of Depoe Bay, Oregon.

The producers decided to shoot the film in the Oregon State Hospital, an actual mental hospital, as this is also the setting of the novel. The hospital's director, Dean Brooks, was supportive of the filming and eventually ended up playing the character of Dr. John Spivey in the film. Brooks identified a patient for each of the actors to shadow, and some of the cast even slept on the wards at night. He also wanted to incorporate his patients into the crew, to which the producers agreed. Douglas recalls that he did not find out until later that many of them were criminally insane.

For the group therapy scenes, Forman and his cinematographer Haskell Wexler used three cameras to record all shots for the scene simultaneously. Although this was unusual for the time and more expensive, it allowed Forman and Wexler to capture the actors' authentic reactions to each other.

Forman's not allowing the actors to see the day's filming led to the cast losing confidence in him, while Nicholson also began to wonder about his performance. Douglas convinced Forman to show Nicholson something, which he did, and restored the actor's confidence.

Haskell Wexler was fired as cinematographer and replaced by Bill Butler. Wexler believed his dismissal was due to his concurrent work on the documentary Underground, in which the radical militant group the Weather Underground was being interviewed while hiding from the law. However, Forman said he had terminated Wexler's services over artistic differences. Douglas also claimed Wexler wanted to get Forman fired to direct the film himself and was fueling the cast's distrust of Forman and lack of confidence in their own performances. Both Wexler and Butler received Academy Award nominations for Best Cinematography for One Flew Over the Cuckoo's Nest, though Wexler said, "[O]nly about a minute or two minutes in that film I didn't shoot.".

According to Butler, Nicholson refused to speak to Forman: "...[Jack] never talked to Miloš at all, he only talked to me".

The production went over the initial budget of $2 million and over schedule, but Zaentz, who was personally financing the movie, was able to come up with the difference by borrowing against his company, Fantasy Records. The total production budget came to $4.4 million.

== Release ==
After many other studios refused to distribute One Flew Over the Cuckoo's Nest, United Artists—Douglas's last choice—agreed. The film’s World Premiere was November 7, 1975, the opening night of the 11th Chicago International Film Festival, where Jack Nicholson and other cast members were present. The film’s U.S commercial opening was two weeks later, at the Sutton and Paramount Theatres in New York City on November 19, 1975. It was the second-highest-grossing film released in 1975 in the United States and Canada at $109 million, one of the seven highest-grossing films of all time at the time. As it was released toward the end of the year, most of its gross was in 1976 and was the highest grosser for calendar year 1976 with rentals of $56.5 million.

Worldwide, One Flew Over the Cuckoo's Nest grossed $163,250,000. It was the highest-grossing film released by UA up to that time.

== Reception ==
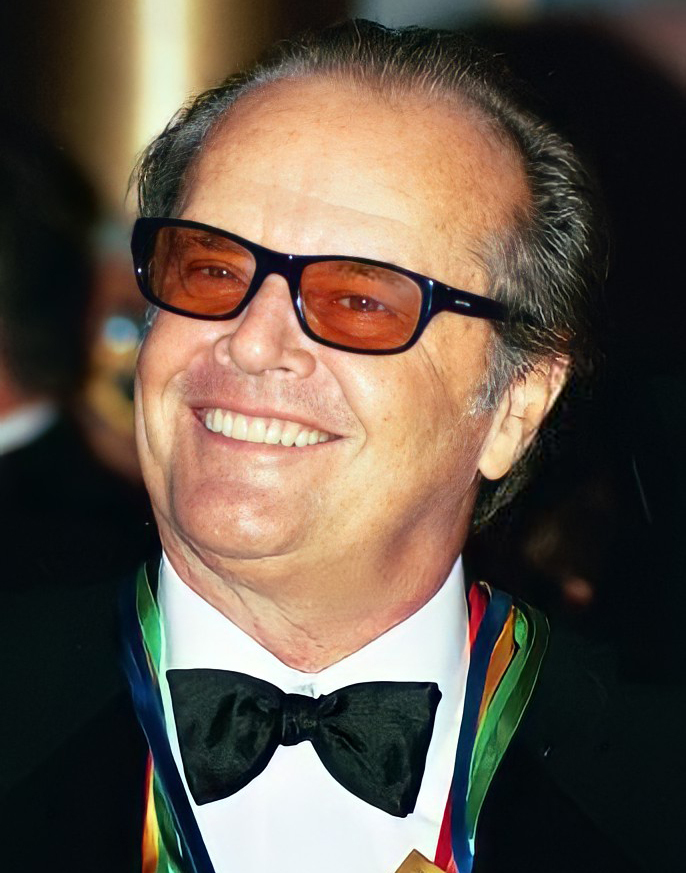
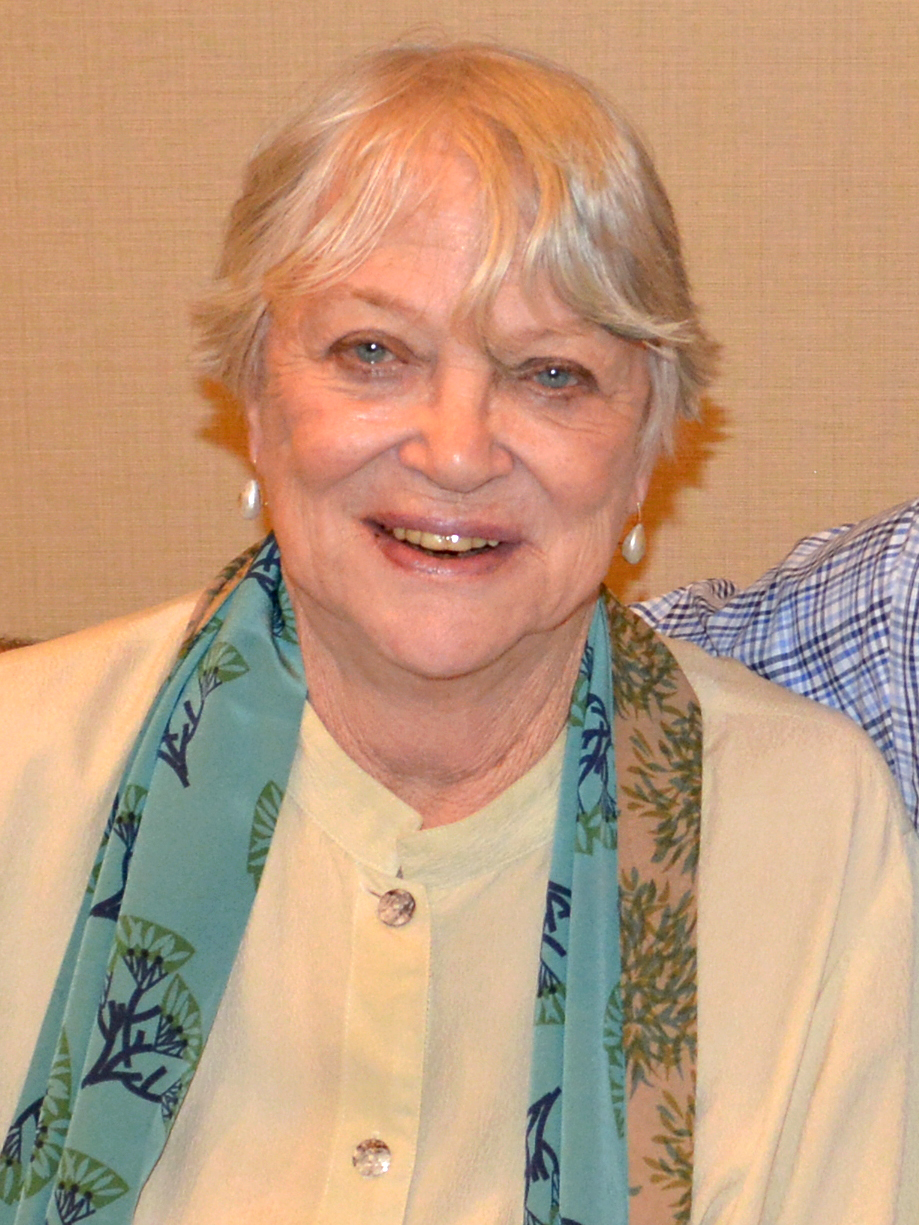
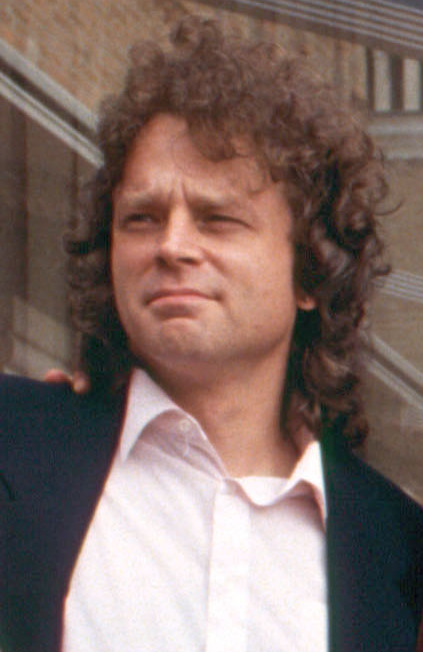
Jack Nicholson, Louise Fletcher and Brad Dourif garnered widespread critical acclaim for their performances, earning them Academy Award nominations for Best Actor, Best Actress, and Best Supporting Actor, respectively, with Nicholson and Fletcher winning.

Critics praised the film, sometimes with reservations. Roger Ebert said:

Miloš Forman's One Flew Over the Cuckoo's Nest is a film so good in so many of its parts that there's a temptation to forgive it when it goes wrong. But it does go wrong, insisting on making larger points than its story really should carry, so that at the end, the human qualities of the characters get lost in the significance of it all. And yet, there are those moments of brilliance.

Ebert later put the film on his "Great Movies" list. A.D. Murphy of Variety wrote a mixed review as well, as did Vincent Canby in The New York Times:

A comedy that can't quite support its tragic conclusion, which is too schematic to be honestly moving, but it is acted with such a sense of life that one responds to its demonstration of humanity if not to its programmed metaphors.

The film opens and closes with original music by composer Jack Nitzsche, featuring an eerie bowed saw (performed by Robert Armstrong) and wine glasses. On the score, reviewer Steven McDonald:

The edgy nature of the film extends into the score, giving it a profoundly disturbing feel at times—even when it appears to be relatively normal. The music has a tendency to always be a little off-kilter, and from time to time, it tilts completely over into a strange little world of its own.

The film won the "Big Five" Academy Awards at the 48th Oscar ceremony. These include the Best Actor for Jack Nicholson, Best Actress for Louise Fletcher, Best Director for Forman, Best Picture, and Best Adapted Screenplay for Lawrence Hauben and Bo Goldman. The film has a 93% rating at Rotten Tomatoes based on reviews from 115 critics, with an average rating of 9.1/10. The website's critics consensus reads: "Jack Nicholson and Louise Fletcher are worthy adversaries in One Flew Over the Cuckoo's Nest, with Miloš Forman's more grounded and morally ambiguous approach to Ken Kesey's surrealistic novel yielding a film of outsized power." The film has an 84 rating on Metacritic.

While Kesey claimed never to have seen the movie, he disliked what he knew of it, which was confirmed by author Chuck Palahniuk, who wrote: "The first time I heard this story, it was through the movie starring Jack Nicholson. A movie that Kesey once told me he disliked."

In 1993, the film was deemed "culturally, historically, or aesthetically significant" by the United States Library of Congress and selected for preservation in its National Film Registry. Michael Douglas was gratified that his father praised the film and Nicholson's performance. He said in 2025 that

The film is a star vehicle for Jack, but it's an ensemble film at its heart. What we're seeing on the screen is camaraderie, and I think that's why it stood the test of time. It's also a funny movie. Yes it gets sad, but when the Chief breaks out and Christopher Lloyd is triumphant, it ends on a very positive note. I think that's partly why it succeeded.

Japanese filmmaker Akira Kurosawa cited Cuckoo's Nest as one of his 100 favorite films.

In 2014, WhatCulture ranked Louise Fletcher's role second in its "Top 10 Most Convincing Movie Psychopath Performances".

== In popular culture ==
Pantera singer Phil Anselmo released a music video, "Choosing Mental Illness", with his band Philip H. Anselmo & The Illegals. The music video pays tribute to One Flew Over the Cuckoo's Nest and it shows scenes recreated from the film with Anselmo playing McMurphy and the rest of the band playing other characters from the film, and Nurse Ratched played by actor Michael St. Michaels.

The film has been referenced several times on The Simpsons, including an episode where Homer is committed to an insane asylum and meets a man who believes himself to be Michael Jackson. In an episode from the fourth season of It's Always Sunny in Philadelphia, titled "Sweet Dee Has a Heart Attack", Danny DeVito's character Frank Reynolds is part of a subplot that directly parodies the film.

Danny DeVito's role in the parody is significant since he was cast in the original film as the character Martini. In the episode of It's Always Sunny in Philadelphia, a reference is made to DeVito's original role with a character in the parody named "Martini". Additionally, the 1975 film featured Will Sampson as Chief Bromden. In the parody, Tim Sampson, son of Will Sampson, plays Chief in mirroring his father's role in the film.

The film is referenced in a song in the musical Next to Normal, "Didn't I See This Movie", where the main character, Diana, fears going under electroconvulsive therapy because of this movie.

In Cult of Chucky, when Nica first meets Malcolm at the asylum, she trades him a stick of Juicy Fruit chewing gum for a cigarette. When he begins to chew he says, "Mmm, Juicy Fruit". This is a reference to the scene when Murphy gives a stick of Juicy Fruit to Chief and he says the same line. Chucky also refers to the asylum as a "cuckoo's nest", another nod to that film, in which Brad Dourif debuted as Billy Bibbit.

== Awards and nominations ==
Award	Category	Nominees	Result
Academy Awards	Best Picture	Michael Douglas and Saul Zaentz	Won
Academy Awards	Best Director	Miloš Forman	Won
Academy Awards	Best Actor	Jack Nicholson	Won
Academy Awards	Best Actress	Louise Fletcher	Won
Academy Awards	Best Supporting Actor	Brad Dourif	Nominated
Academy Awards	Best Screenplay – Adapted from Other Material	Lawrence Hauben and Bo Goldman	Won
Academy Awards	Best Cinematography	Haskell Wexler and Bill Butler	Nominated
Academy Awards	Best Film Editing	Richard Chew, Lynzee Klingman and Sheldon Kahn	Nominated
Academy Awards	Best Original Score	Jack Nitzsche	Nominated
American Cinema Editors Awards	Best Edited Feature Film	Richard Chew, Lynzee Klingman and Sheldon Kahn	Nominated
Bodil Awards	Best Non-European Film	Miloš Forman	Won
British Academy Film Awards	Best Film		Won
British Academy Film Awards	Best Direction	Miloš Forman	Won
British Academy Film Awards	Best Actor in a Leading Role	Jack Nicholson	Won
British Academy Film Awards	Best Actress in a Leading Role	Louise Fletcher	Won
British Academy Film Awards	Best Actor in a Supporting Role	Brad Dourif	Won
British Academy Film Awards	Best Screenplay	Lawrence Hauben and Bo Goldman	Nominated
British Academy Film Awards	Best Cinematography	Haskell Wexler and Bill Butler	Nominated
British Academy Film Awards	Best Editing	Richard Chew, Lynzee Klingman and Sheldon Kahn	Won
Chicago International Film Festival	Best Feature	Miloš Forman	Nominated
César Awards	Best Foreign Film		Nominated
David di Donatello Awards	Best Foreign Director	Miloš Forman	Won
David di Donatello Awards	Best Foreign Actor	Jack Nicholson	Won
Directors Guild of America Awards	Outstanding Directorial Achievement in Motion Pictures	Miloš Forman	Won
Golden Globe Awards	Best Motion Picture – Drama		Won
Golden Globe Awards	Best Actor in a Motion Picture – Drama	Jack Nicholson	Won
Golden Globe Awards	Best Actress in a Motion Picture – Drama	Louise Fletcher	Won
Golden Globe Awards	Best Director – Motion Picture	Miloš Forman	Won
Golden Globe Awards	Best Screenplay – Motion Picture	Lawrence Hauben and Bo Goldman	Won
Golden Globe Awards	New Star of the Year – Actor	Brad Dourif	Won
Golden Screen Awards			Won
Grammy Awards	Best Album of Best Original Score Written for a Motion Picture or Television Special	Jack Nitzsche	Nominated
Kansas City Film Critics Circle Awards	Best Director	Miloš Forman	Won
Kinema Junpo Awards	Best Foreign Director	Miloš Forman	Won
Los Angeles Film Critics Association Awards	Best Film		Won (Note: Tied with Dog Day Afternoon.)
Nastro d'Argento	Best Foreign Director	Miloš Forman	Won
National Board of Review Awards	Top Ten Films		3rd Place
National Board of Review Awards	Best Actor	Jack Nicholson	Won
National Film Preservation Board	National Film Registry		Inducted
National Society of Film Critics Awards	Best Actor	Jack Nicholson	Won
New York Film Critics Circle Awards	Best Actor	Jack Nicholson	Won
New York Film Critics Circle Awards	Best Supporting Actress	Louise Fletcher	Runner-up
Online Film & Television Association Awards	Hall of Fame – Motion Picture		Won
People's Choice Awards	Favorite Motion Picture		Won
Sant Jordi Awards	Best Foreign Actor	Jack Nicholson (also for Carnal Knowledge and The Passenger)	Won
Writers Guild of America Awards	Best Drama Adapted from Another Medium	Lawrence Hauben and Bo Goldman	Won

In 2006, Writers Guild of America West ranked its screenplay 45th in WGA's list of 101 Greatest Screenplays. In 2015, the film ranked 59th on BBC's "100 Greatest American Films" list, voted on by film critics from around the world.

American Film Institute

- AFI's 100 Years... 100 Movies – #20
- AFI's 100 Years... 100 Heroes and Villains:
  - Nurse Ratched – #5 Villain
- AFI's 100 Years... 100 Cheers – #17
- AFI's 100 Years... 100 Movies (10th Anniversary Edition) – #33

== See also ==
- List of Academy Award records
- List of Big Five Academy Award winners and nominees
- Mental illness in film
- Ratched
- One Flew Over the Cuckoo's Nest (play)
