= Tod Carroll =

American film producer

- Born: United States
- Occupation: Screenwriter

Tod Carroll is an American screenwriter and former writer for National Lampoon magazine, best known for such films as Clean and Sober, O.C. and Stiggs and National Lampoon's Movie Madness.
