= Exit/In =

Music venue in Nashville, Tennessee, U.S.

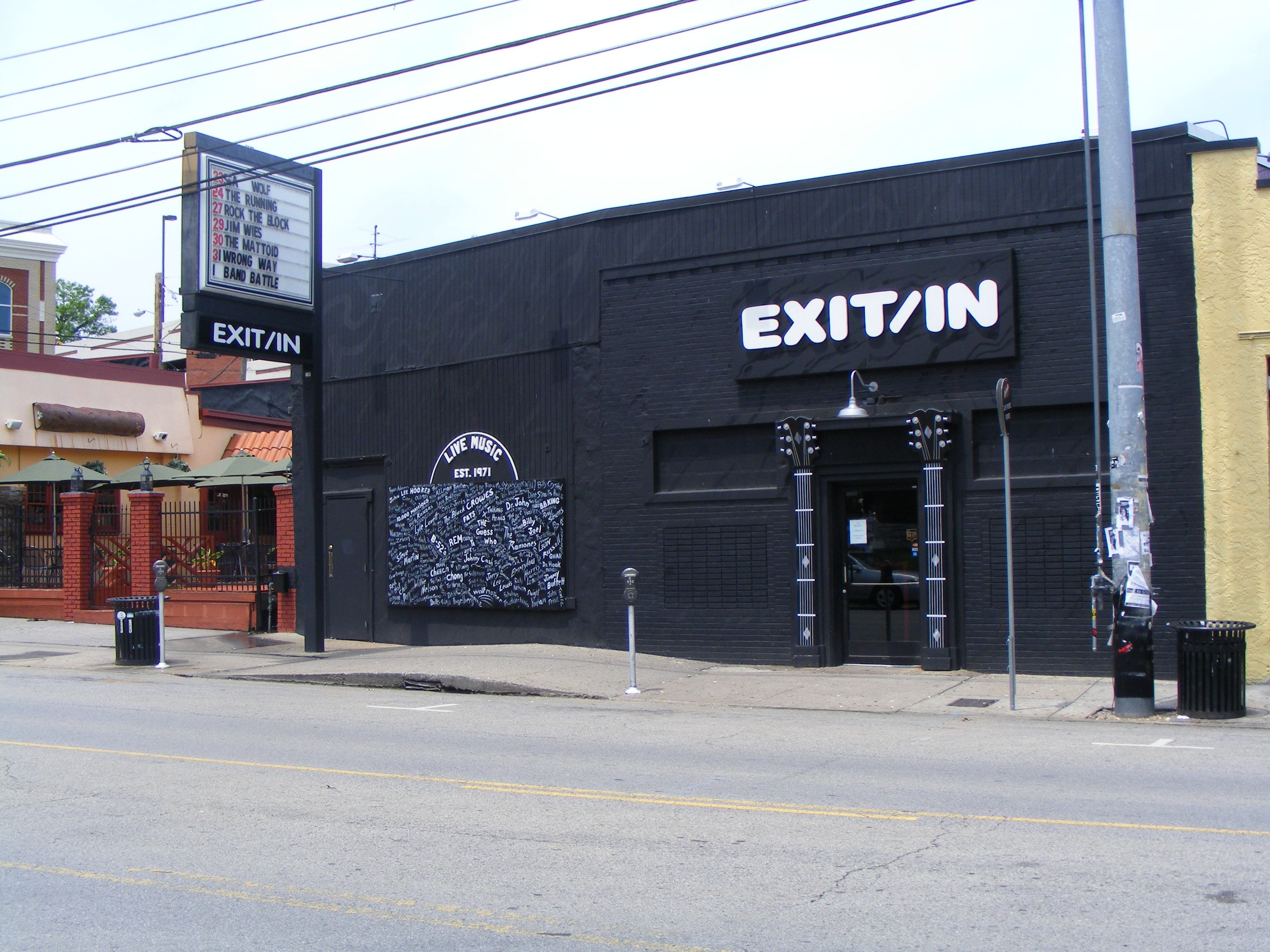
- The front façade of the Exit/In
- Interactive map of Exit/In
- Address: 2208 Elliston Place
- Location: Nashville, Tennessee
- Coordinates: 36.15135°N 86.80434°W
- Owner: AJ Capital Partners
- Capacity: 500
- Event: rock music

Construction
- Opened: 1971

Website
- www.exitin.com

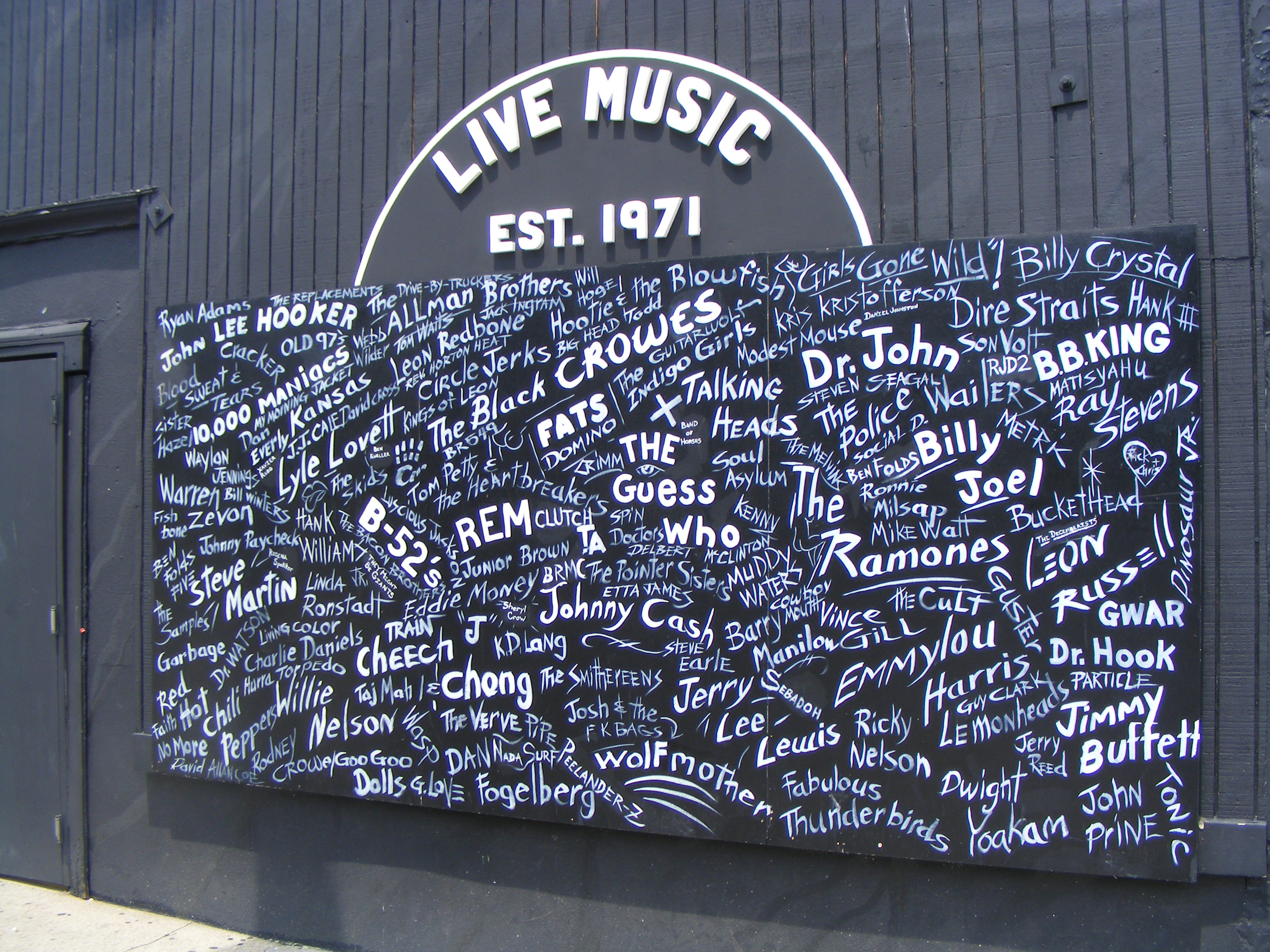
The partial list of bands outside

Exit/In is a music venue in Nashville, Tennessee. Exit/In is located on Elliston Place near Centennial Park and Vanderbilt University, west of downtown. It opened in 1971 under the management of Owsley Manier and Brugh Reynolds. As a small venue seating 200 or so, it developed its unique reputation in the 1970s because of the unusual things that occurred almost nightly. The club was expanded in the early 1980s to accommodate 500 patrons.

In the early years, the establishment featured a variety of genres, ranging from bluegrass to jazz to stand-up comedy; in the latter category, Steve Martin was noted for his frequent shows there in the 1970s before attaining national fame. However, by the 1980s, it had become primarily a rock club, specializing in both aspiring local acts as well as nationally-known artists. Exit/In has reputedly had over 25 separate owners during its half-century of existence, and the club has been closed in the past for extended periods, meaning its history is not continuous, despite its age. An early iteration of the nightspot featured vegetarian cuisine in the 1970s, but this was eventually discontinued, and, today, no food is served, only alcoholic beverages.

Several documentaries have been recorded on the inside of Exit/In, and many artists, including Kellie Pickler, have used the space to shoot music videos.

The club is featured in the 1975 Robert Altman film Nashville. The club was also featured in Steve Martin's Born Standing Up.

On the back cover of The Police's Zenyatta Mondatta album, Sting can be seen in one of the small photos wearing an Exit/In t-shirt.

On November 14, 2022, the club operators, Chris and Telisha Cobb, announced their departure. In December 2022 AJ Capital Partners, was announced as the new purchasers and operators of the venue. The venue was listed on the National Register of Historic Places in 2023.
