= Nashville (film) =

1975 film by Robert Altman

- Theatrical release poster
- Directed by: Robert Altman
- Written by: Joan Tewkesbury
- Produced by: Robert Altman
- Starring: David Arkin; Barbara Baxley; Ned Beatty; Karen Black; Ronee Blakley; Timothy Brown; Keith Carradine; Geraldine Chaplin; Robert DoQui; Shelley Duvall; Allen Garfield; Henry Gibson; Scott Glenn; Jeff Goldblum; Barbara Harris; David Hayward; Michael Murphy; Allan F. Nicholls; Dave Peel; Thomas Hal Phillips; Cristina Raines; Bert Remsen; Lily Tomlin; Gwen Welles; Keenan Wynn
- Cinematography: Paul Lohmann
- Edited by: Dennis M. Hill; Sidney Levin
- Music by: Richard Baskin
- Production company: ABC Motion Pictures
- Distributed by: Paramount Pictures
- Release date: June 11, 1975
- Running time: 160 minutes
- Country: United States
- Language: English
- Budget: $2.2 million
- Box office: $10 million

Nashville is a 1975 American satirical musical comedy drama film directed and produced by Robert Altman. The film follows various people involved in the country and gospel music industry in Nashville, Tennessee, over the five-day period leading up to a gala concert for a populist outsider running for president on the Replacement Party ticket.

Nashville is often noted for its scope; the film contains 24 main characters, an hour's worth of musical numbers, and multiple storylines. Its large ensemble cast includes David Arkin, Barbara Baxley, Ned Beatty, Karen Black, Ronee Blakley, Timothy Brown, Keith Carradine, Geraldine Chaplin, Robert DoQui, Shelley Duvall, Allen Garfield, Henry Gibson, Scott Glenn, Jeff Goldblum, Barbara Harris, David Hayward, Michael Murphy, Allan F. Nicholls, Dave Peel, Cristina Raines, Bert Remsen, Lily Tomlin, Gwen Welles, and Keenan Wynn.

The screenplay for Nashville was written by Altman's frequent collaborator Joan Tewkesbury, based partly on her experiences as an outsider visiting the city and observing its local music industry. Several incidents she experienced appear in the finished film, though Altman improvised numerous additional scenes and plot strands during filming. The film was shot on location in Nashville in 1974.

Nashville was released by Paramount Pictures in the summer of 1975, and opened with widespread critical acclaim, praising the ensemble cast (mainly Blakley and Tomlin), mise-en-scène and soundtrack. It garnered numerous accolades, including five Academy Award nominations, including Best Picture, Best Director, Best Supporting Actress (for both Ronee Blakley and Lily Tomlin), and winning for Best Original Song for Carradine's track "I'm Easy". The film was nominated for a total of 11 Golden Globe Awards, to date the highest number of nominations received by one film. Since then, it has been considered Altman's magnum opus, and one of the greatest films of all time. In 1992, the film was selected for preservation in the United States National Film Registry by the Library of Congress as being "culturally, historically, or aesthetically significant".

== Plot ==
Hal Phillip Walker, Replacement Party candidate in the 1976 United States presidential election, arrives in Nashville for a fundraising gala. Meanwhile, two recording sessions are taking place in a nearby studio: in one room, country superstar Haven Hamilton records a patriotic song commemorating the Bicentennial, while next door, Linnea Reese, a white gospel singer, records a song with the Jubilee Singers of historically black Fisk University. Opal, an Englishwoman who claims to be working on a documentary for the BBC (though she refers to the British Broadcasting Company, not the British Broadcasting Corporation), attempts to listen in on the sessions.

Later that day, country singer Barbara Jean returns to Nashville following what the crowd believes was a burn accident (which may actually have been a nervous breakdown and stay at a mental hospital). She is greeted at Berry Field by local industry elites, including Haven and his companion, Lady Pearl, a nightclub owner. Also present are Pfc. Glenn Kelly, who is obsessed with Barbara Jean, and a popular folk trio consisting of married couple Bill and Mary, and guitarist Tom, who are in town to record an album. Meanwhile, Martha, a teen groupie going by the name "L.A. Joan", is picked up by her uncle, Mr. Green, at the airport; she has arrived to visit her dying aunt Esther, but covertly plans to pursue musicians. In the airport cafe, African-American cook Wade Cooley and his co-worker, a waitress named Sueleen, discuss her aspirations to become a singer.

On the tarmac, Barbara Jean collapses from heat exhaustion, and those in attendance depart the airport only to become stranded after a vehicle pile-up occurs. During the commotion, Winifred, an aspiring country singer, runs away from her husband Star; Star then gives a ride to Kenny Frasier, who has just arrived in town carrying a violin case. Opal takes advantage of the traffic jam to interview Linnea, as well as Tommy Brown, an African-American country singer. That night, Sueleen performs at an open mic, demonstrating no singing ability, but leading to her recruitment as entertainment for Walker's fundraiser. Meanwhile, Linnea's husband Del has John Triplette, Walker's political organizer, over for dinner. Throughout the meal, Linnea mainly focuses on communicating with her two deaf children. Tom, who crossed paths with Linnea a few weeks earlier, phones the house to ask Linnea on a date, but she dissuades him. At a party he hosts, Haven is offered a political career by Triplette despite being informed that Haven will never take political sides. Glamorous singer Connie White performs that night, in lieu of Barbara Jean at the Grand Ole Opry. Mary misses Connie's performance to Bill's dismay, instead having sex with Tom at the hotel. At the hospital, Barbara Jean argues with her manager husband Barnett over Connie replacing her, and he accuses her of having another nervous breakdown, angrily establishing his dominance.

On Sunday morning, Lady Pearl, Wade, and Sueleen attend a Catholic mass, while Linnea sings in the choir of a black Baptist church. In the hospital chapel, Barbara Jean sings "In the Garden" from her wheelchair while Mr. Green, Pfc. Kelly, and others watch. Opal wanders through a massive auto scrapyard, recording observations on a tape recorder. Haven, Tommy, and their families attend the stock car races, where Winifred unsuccessfully attempts to sing on a small stage. Bill and Mary argue in their hotel room and are interrupted by Triplette, who recruits them to perform at the gala, while Tom tries to get chauffeur Norman to score him drugs.

After Barbara Jean is discharged, she gives an initially strong performance at Opryland USA that ends in her being pulled off stage as she rambles between songs. To remediate her poor performance, Barnett pledges her to perform at Walker's gala. Martha meanwhile agitates Kenny, who is renting a room in her uncle's house, when she attempts to open his violin case. At the Exit/In club that night, Linnea, Martha, Bill, Mary, Opal, Norman and Wade are among those attending an open mic. Tom sings "I'm Easy" and Linnea, moved, goes back to his room with him. With Linnea still in bed with him, Tom calls another woman on the phone, but Linnea leaves, unconcerned. Meanwhile, at an all-male Walker fundraiser, Sueleen is booed off stage for singing poorly; Del and Triplette convince her to perform a striptease in exchange for a slot at the gala. A drunken Del later comes onto Sueleen, but Wade rescues her. He tells her that she cannot sing and attempts to persuade her to come to Detroit with him; she refuses, determined to "sing with Barbara Jean".

The next morning, the performers and audience converge at the Parthenon for Walker's gala concert. Barnett, protecting Barbara Jean, objects to a large political banner hanging as the stage backdrop (under an enormous American flag). When the concert opens, the banner has not been removed. The lineup consists of Barbara Jean, Haven, Linnea and her choir, Mary and Tom, and Sueleen; Winifred arrives, hoping to sing. Meanwhile, Mr. Green and Kenny arrive at the gala searching for Martha, who has failed to attend her aunt Esther's funeral, and find her accompanying Bill. During Barbara Jean's set on stage, Kenny produces a gun from his violin case, and begins shooting at the stage. Barbara Jean is shot; a bullet grazes Haven's arm. Chaos breaks out. Kelly disarms Kenny. Barbara Jean is carried off the stage, bleeding profusely. Haven tries to calm the crowd by exhorting them to sing, asserting that "This isn't Dallas.” Being wounded, he gives over the mic to Winifred, who haltingly then more strongly begins singing "It Don't Worry Me", eventually joined by Linnea's gospel choir also on stage.

== Cast ==
Major characters

- David Arkin as Norman, a chauffeur hired to drive Bill, Mary and Tom during their stay in Nashville. While he believes himself to be their friend and confidant, they simply consider him the hired help, though he becomes a confidant to Bill.
- Barbara Baxley as Lady Pearl, Haven Hamilton's companion who manages a bluegrass club. She appears inebriated for most of the film, and postulates on the Kennedys and her Catholicism.
- Ned Beatty as Delbert "Del" Reese, a portly good old boy with a struggling marriage and an endlessly wandering eye. He is Haven Hamilton's lawyer and the local organizer for the Walker campaign. He recruits Sueleen for the Parthenon performance at the film’s finale.
- Karen Black as Connie White, a glamorous country singer and rival of Barbara Jean. She replaces Barbara Jean at the Grand Ole Opry and performs later at a nightclub attended by Haven, Pearl, and Opal.
- Ronee Blakley as Barbara Jean, an emotionally fragile country singer who is regarded as the sweetheart of Nashville. She stays at a hospital for the film’s first half and gives a series of performances in the second half.
- Timothy Brown as Tommy Brown, an African American singer who performs at the Grand Ole Opry. Chastised by Wade for pandering to white audiences with his music, he is Haven Hamilton’s friend and accompanies him to the racetrack and his performance at the Parthenon.
- Keith Carradine as Tom Frank, a member of the folk rock trio Bill, Mary and Tom. Seeking to reinvent himself as a solo artist, he parts ways with Bill and Mary upon arriving in Nashville, and romances Opal and Linnea.
- Geraldine Chaplin as Opal, a wacky, celebrity-obsessed, chatty English woman who claims to be a BBC Radio documentarian. She provides an outsider's perspective on the music business, and acts as a surrogate for the audience as she encounters each of the characters.
- Robert DoQui as Wade Cooley, a cook at the airport restaurant and a friend and protector of Sueleen. He tries to make her aware of her singing limitations so that she doesn't get taken advantage of in her quest for fame.
- Shelley Duvall as Martha, the niece of Mr. Green. Martha, who has changed her name to "L.A. Joan", has come to Nashville ostensibly to visit her dying Aunt Esther, but spends all her time pursuing various male musicians, and skips her aunt’s funeral.
- Allen Garfield as Barnett, Barbara Jean's short-tempered husband and manager who frequently lashes out at others. He appears to be very worried about his wife's health and career, but appears to be more concerned about himself and is very controlling of her.
- Henry Gibson as Haven Hamilton, a self-absorbed, Nudie suit-wearing star of the Grand Ole Opry. His political ambitions play a pivotal role in the film's plot, as he is courted to run for Governor of Tennessee by John Triplette.
- Scott Glenn as Pfc. Glenn Kelly, a Vietnam War veteran who has come to Nashville to see Barbara Jean perform. She recently survived a fire and he claims his mother, a fan, is the one who pulled her out and saved her life.
- Jeff Goldblum as the silent Tricycle Man. He rides his long, low-slung three-wheel motorcycle everywhere, and serves as a structural connector for scenes in the film.
- Barbara Harris as Winifred (or Albuquerque), an aspiring singer-songwriter who runs away from her irascible husband, Star. Despite her straggly appearance and repeated failures, in the most serious moment she reveals singing talent and presence of mind.
- David Hayward as Kenny Frasier, a loner who carries a violin case, discusses Winifred’s aspiration to be a singer, rents a room from Mr. Green.
- Michael Murphy as John Triplette, a young, smooth-talking, and duplicitous operative and advance man for Walker's presidential campaign. He views many of the Nashville locals with a degree of condescension and is only interested in them for the publicity they can bring to the Walker campaign, recruiting Haven Hamilton, Barbara Jean, and Sueleen for the campaign.
- Allan F. Nicholls as Bill, one of the folk trio Bill, Mary and Tom. He is married to Mary. During the film his marriage is tested as a love triangle becomes apparent.
- Dave Peel as Bud Hamilton, the soft-spoken son of Haven Hamilton. A graduate of Harvard Law School, he manages his father's business affairs. He privately admits to Opal that he would like to be a singer himself but that his father won't allow it.
- Cristina Raines as Mary, one of the folk trio Bill, Mary and Tom. She is married to Bill, but is in love with Tom.
- Bert Remsen as Star, an ornery man who is chasing after his runaway wife Winifred.
- Lily Tomlin as Linnea Reese, a gospel singer, wife of Delbert Reese and loving mother of two deaf children. She is pursued by Tom throughout the film.
- Gwen Welles as Sueleen Gay, a pretty but naïve young waitress at the airport lunch counter and a talentless, aspiring country singer. Her refusal to recognize her lack of singing talent and the ulterior motives of those she encounters gets her in trouble.
- Keenan Wynn as Mr. Green, the aging uncle of Martha. His wife is dying and he spends the film trying to get Martha to visit her.
- Thomas Hal Phillips as Hal Phillip Walker, the fictitious, third-party presidential hopeful heard, never seen--but very nearly omnipresent--via a banal, pre-recorded voice casually pontificating the state of politics, culture, and society in modern-day America. His voice is blared over a public address speaker affixed to the top of a lone, ubiquitous campaign van being driven daily throughout the city of Nashville, wherein it is both consistently criss-crossing and appearing at the very contiguous fringes and periphery of the film's intersecting character mosaic. Phillips would later make a cameo appearance as Walker in Altman's O.C. and Stiggs (1987).

Minor characters

- Richard Baskin, the film's musical supervisor, wrote several of the songs performed in the film. He has a cameo as Frog, a session musician, appearing in several scenes.
- Merle Kilgore as Trout, the owner of a club that has an open-mic talent night that gives Sueleen Gay what she believes is her big break as a singer.

There are cameo appearances by Elliott Gould, Julie Christie, Sue Barton, Vassar Clements, and Howard K. Smith, all playing themselves. Gould and Christie were passing through Nashville when Altman added them. Altman plays Bob, an unseen producer who in the beginning of the film is producing Haven Hamilton's song "200 Years". He can be heard on a speaker when Hamilton gets agitated by Frog's inept piano playing.

== Analysis and themes ==
In a 1995 academic article published in American Quarterly, Paul Lauter, a professor of American Studies at Trinity College, compared the film to "a poststructuralist theoretical text", adding that "it invites, indeed valorizes, contradiction and seems designed to resist closure." As a result, he explained, "interpretations of the film have been wildly divergent and evaluations contradictory."

=== Political content ===
Film scholars Yoram Allon, Del Cullen, and Hannah Patterson describe Nashville as an "epic study of ambition, greed, talent, and politics in American culture, with the country and western music businesses serving as a microcosm of American society." Ray Sawhill of Salon views the film as reflective of the 1970s' political climate, writing that the film "comes across as a piece of New Journalism; it's like Norman Mailer's reports from conventions and rallies. Altman is using Nashville metaphorically—he's really talking about politics. I wish he didn't make that quite so explicit. There's a reference to Dallas and a few to the Kennedys, as well as some red-white-and-blue visual cues, that the film could have done without. Still, the result is an X-ray of the era's uneasy political soul. What it reveals is a country trying to pull itself together from a nervous breakdown."

=== Celebrity ===
Sawhill suggests that the film is preoccupied with "a populist culture driving itself mad with celebrity" and presents Nashville as a "provincial New York or Hollywood, as one of the places where the culture manufactures its image of itself." He cites the various recording and communication devices present as evidence of this: "wires, phones, intercoms, cameras, mikes, speakers—seem to be everywhere; so does the machinery of publicity and fame. We watch the city recording itself, playing itself back to itself and marketing that image to itself. We eavesdrop on the culture's conversation with itself. We're watching people decide how they want to see themselves and how they want to sell themselves."

== Production ==
=== Screenplay ===
"[Connie White and Barbara Jean] are the personification of Nashville rivalries... the prototype of what Nashville music wanted its women to look like. Tammy Wynette. Dolly [Parton]. These women are tough, but my God they believe in religion. Dolly is up at four in the morning writing her songs and saying her prayers and she is not bullshitting you about that. There is great heart to these women."

— Screenwriter Tewkesbury on the basis of Connie White and Barbara Jean

In the 1970s, United Artists attempted to hire Robert Altman to direct a screenplay about country-western music titled The Great Southern Amusement Company. Altman declined but became interested in directing a film on the subject after reading William Price Fox's novel Ruby Red, and agreed to make an original film for UA. The original screenplay for Nashville was written by Joan Tewkesbury, who had collaborated with Altman on several of his films, including McCabe & Mrs. Miller (1971) and Thieves Like Us (1974). She had proposed a Nashville-set film to Altman prior to his filming of McCabe & Mrs. Miller; he became interested in the setting and sent Tewkesbury to Nashville in the fall of 1973 to observe the area and its citizenry. Tewkesbury's diary of her trip provided the basis for the screenplay, with many observations making it into the finished film, such as the highway pileup. However, as with most Altman projects, much of the dialogue was improvised with the script acting as a "blueprint" dictating the actions of the characters and the plot.

Tewkesbury, who was working as an instructor at the University of Southern California, rewrote her screenplay several times. In the original draft, the film opened with a scene featuring Tom on the street in New York City prior to his arrival in Nashville. Tewkesbury had been partly inspired to write the film based on her observations of the music industry being geographically "pulled apart. The country-western thing had suddenly exploded in Nashville, but [musicians] still had to come to New York for getting paid, and business deals." None of Tewkesbury's incarnations of the screenplay featured any death scenes, but Altman, who had a "penchant for the tragic denouement", proposed the idea that Barbara Jean would be assassinated in the finale. Altman also conceived the political subplot about the presidential candidate Hal Phillip Walker. The political speeches and dialogue for this subplot were written by Altman's colleague Thomas Hal Phillips, whose brother Rubel Phillips had run as the Republican Party candidate in the 1963 and 1967 Mississippi gubernatorial elections.

Numerous characters in Nashville are based on real country music figures: Henry Gibson's Haven Hamilton is a composite of Roy Acuff, Hank Snow, and Porter Wagoner; Ronee Blakley's Barbara Jean is based on Loretta Lynn; the black country singer Tommy Brown (played by Timothy Brown) is based on Charley Pride; and the feuding folk trio is based on Peter, Paul and Mary; within the trio, the married couple of Bill and Mary were inspired by Bill Danoff and Taffy Nivert, who later became Starland Vocal Band. Keith Carradine's character is believed to be inspired by Kris Kristofferson, and Karen Black's Connie White was conceived as a composite of Lynn Anderson (who spoke unfavorably of the film after its release), Tammy Wynette, and Dolly Parton. Other characters were based on or inspired by real persons: Linnea was inspired by Louise Fletcher, who had appeared in Altman's Thieves Like Us (1974), and who had two deaf parents. The black choir singing with Linnea early in the film is based on the Fisk Jubilee Singers, though it's disputed whether the performers in the film were actually Fisk University students or members of the B. C. & M. (Baptist, Catholic, and Methodist) Choir, a black interdenominational gospel choir based in Nashville. Altman also hired television reporter Howard K. Smith to deliver a commentary on Hal Phillip Walker, for which he instructed him to say anything he wanted either for or against his fictional candidacy.

Although UA had originally agreed to produce the script, the studio reneged because it was unsatisfied with the financial performance of Altman's previous films The Long Goodbye (1973) and Thieves Like Us (1974). After unsuccessfully pitching the film to other studios, producer Jerry Weintraub secured a $2.7 million budget from ABC Records, which wanted to promote a record company it had interest in.

=== Casting ===
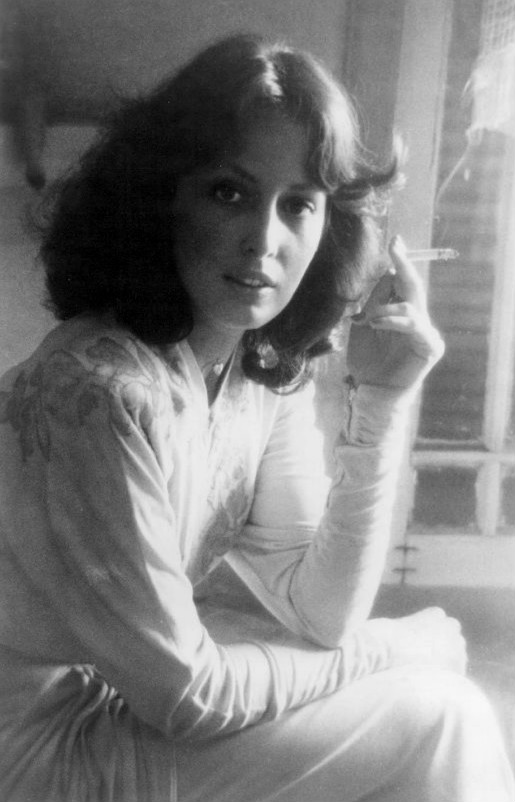
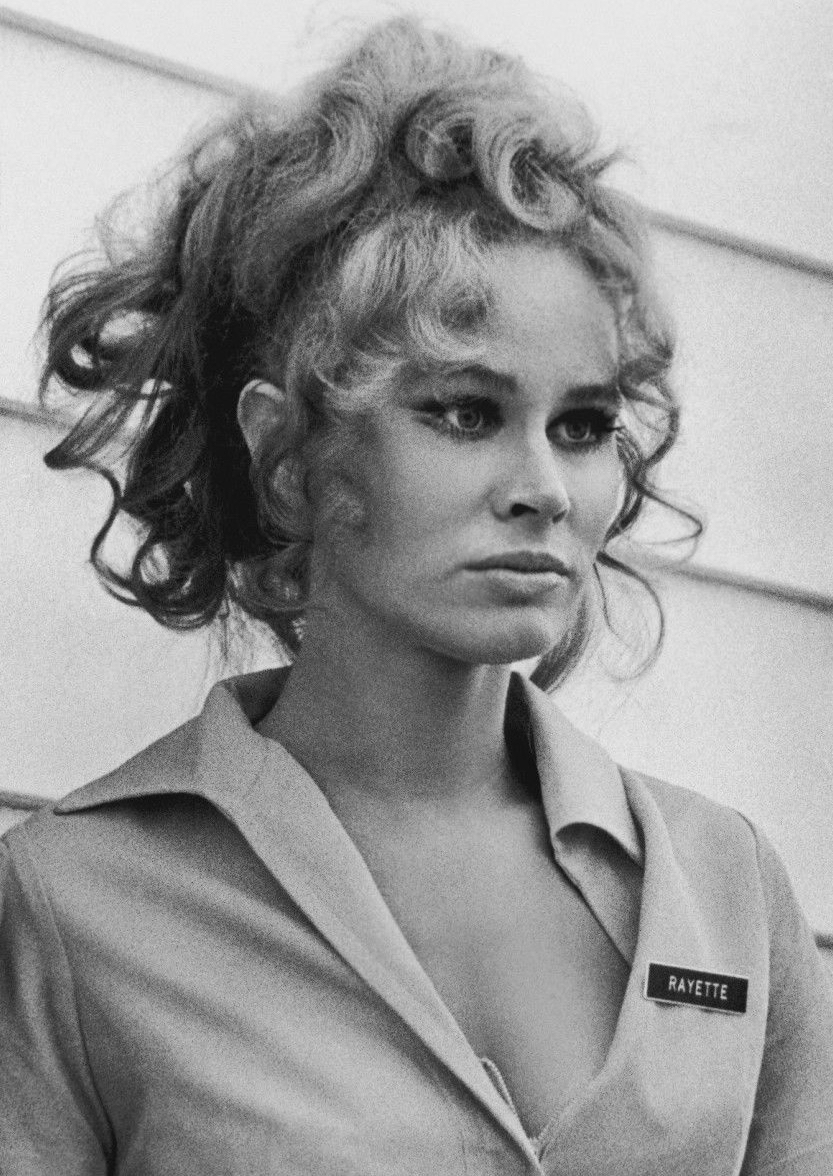
Ronee Blakley and Karen Black were cast as Barbara Jean and Connie White, the country music rivals

As with most of Altman's feature films, he cast the roles using unorthodox methods, forgoing standard auditions and instead basing his decisions off meetings with individual actors. Geraldine Chaplin, daughter of Charlie Chaplin and Oona O'Neill, was the first to be cast, appearing in the role of Opal, the chatty journalist who has arrived from out of town to cover the gala. Screenwriter Tewkesbury, who had based the character of Opal on herself, selected Chaplin for the role long before the production had even secured funding. Altman flew Chaplin from her residence in Switzerland to Nashville, and she toured the city with Tewkesbury in preparation for the role.

Several Altman regulars were cast in the film, among them Keith Carradine as Tom, the dashing folk singer who woos several of the female characters, and Shelley Duvall as Martha, the young groupie. Both Carradine and Duvall had had minor roles in McCabe & Mrs. Miller, and had co-starred in Thieves Like Us. Through Carradine, Altman met Allan Nicholls, Carradine's co-star from a Broadway production of Hair. After a meeting, Altman offered Nicholls the role of Bill. Cristina Raines, Carradine's real-life girlfriend at the time, was given the role of Mary, the female counterpart in Bill and Tom's folk trio. Gwen Welles, who had a major part in Altman's previous film, California Split, was cast as Sueleen, a waitress who longs to be a singer.

Karen Black was cast in the role of glamorous singer Connie White after having approached Altman to appear in a prior film, the psychological thriller Images (1972). Black, who had been writing and singing songs in the interim, was cast in Nashville after performing several original songs for Altman. The role of Barbara Jean had not been filled when filming was about to commence. Ronee Blakley, a singer-songwriter from Idaho with no acting experience, was in Nashville at the time and took on the role at the last minute, having been hired to write several songs for the film. Barbara Harris, primarily a stage actress, was given the role of fledgling singer Winifred.

In the role of Linnea Reese, the gospel singer and dedicated mother, Altman cast Lily Tomlin, who at the time had no prior film experience, having worked exclusively in television. Altman had originally cast Louise Fletcher in the role, but Tomlin was hired after Fletcher replaced her as Nurse Ratched in One Flew Over the Cuckoo's Nest (1975). "When I got the script, I didn't even know what part I was being considered for," Tomlin recalled. "But I thought, I could play any one of these parts. Even the boys." Ned Beatty was cast as Del, Linnea's lawyer husband. Robert Duvall was initially sought for the role of Haven Hamilton, the country superstar, but he declined the role based on Altman's low salary offer. Instead, Altman cast Henry Gibson in the part. Altman struggled finding an actor to portray Bud Hamilton, the Harvard-graduate son of country superstar Haven. While preparing for his role as Haven, Gibson began taking guitar lessons in Santa Monica, and met David Peel, a guitar instructor, who bore a significant resemblance to him. After meeting with Peel, Altman cast him as Bud.

=== Filming ===
The film was shot on location in Nashville in the summer of 1974 on a budget of $2.2 million. In late June, the cast began arriving in Nashville; Carradine and Raines traveled together from Los Angeles, while Beatty arrived and hitched a camper where he resided along with his wife through the duration of the shoot. Beatty recalled an early meeting in which Altman had the cast convene prior to filming: "Bob gets us together in this room. We're all ready to start the movie. And he said, 'Look, I want you to have fun with this. There is only one thing we have to remember. Every character in this movie loves one character. Every one of these characters loves Barbara Jean.' Well, within a short time Ronee Blakley was the only actor in the film who was universally disliked." Throughout the shoot, Altman and Blakley had several disputes regarding her character, and Blakley sometimes rewrote her scenes to Altman's dismay.

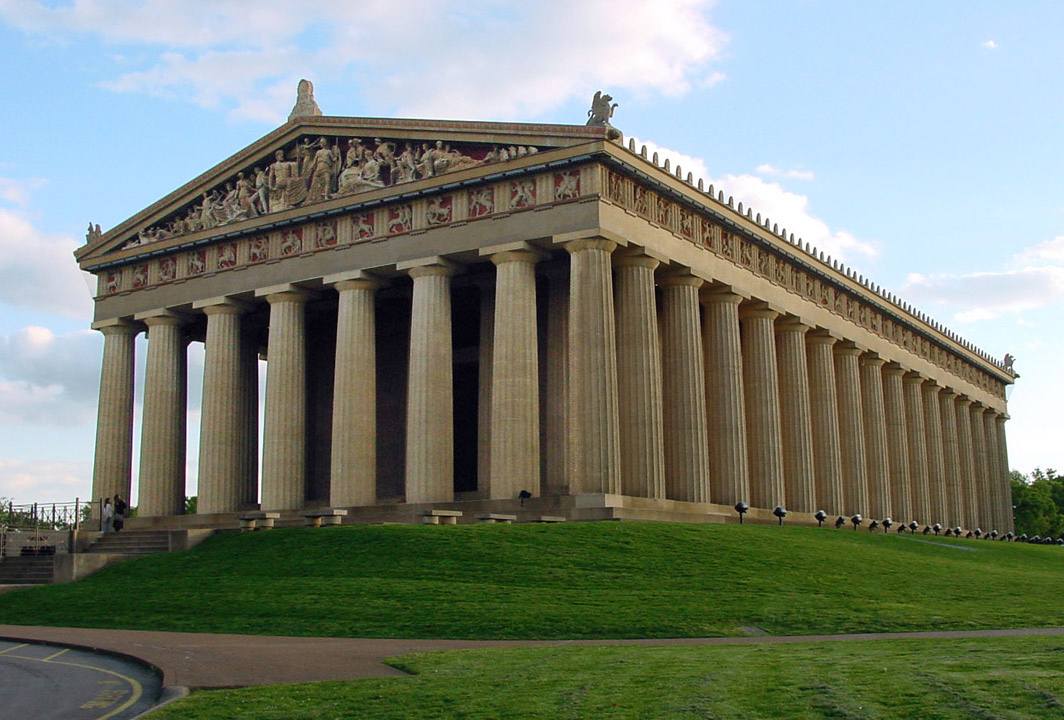
The Parthenon in Nashville, location of the climactic final scene

Locations featured in the film include the Nashville International Airport, and the Exit/In, a Nashville club which screenwriter Tewkesbury had frequented during her trips there. The scene in which Carradine's character performs "I'm Easy" was shot at this club. Altman's log cabin-style house on the outskirts of Nashville was used as the home of Haven and Lady Pearl. The film's climactic assassination sequence, which takes places at the Parthenon, was originally intended to take place at the Ryman Auditorium. However, Altman was forced to change the locale when he was unable to secure access to the then-recently shuttered Ryman Auditorium. Walker, the climactic assassination, the political theme and various associated characters (such as Haven Hamilton) do not appear in the earliest versions of the script, and were integrated into the screenplay throughout filming.

All of the musical scenes featured in the film are actual live concert footage.

The hospital scenes centered on Barbara Jean were filmed in a local hospital that had been closed; one floor of it was refurbished for use in filming.

Nearly all of the extras in the film were Nashville locals. Many of them were not actively participating in the film but simply happened to be at the location where the cast and crew were filming at the time. Recording session legend Lloyd Green ("Mr. Nashville Sound") can be seen playing pedal steel guitar in the opening studio scene. Jeff Newman, known for the pedal steel, is sitting next to him playing a banjo.

=== Post-production ===
Nashville's opening title sequence was designed by the film title designer Dan Perri, who had recently enjoyed his big break with his work on The Exorcist (1973). Under Altman's direction, Perri based the film's unusual, kitschy title sequence on low-budget K-Tel Records television commercials, and brought in Johnny Grant to provide the loud, brash voiceover. Perri later went on to design titles for a number of other major Hollywood pictures, including Taxi Driver (1976), Star Wars (1977), and Raging Bull (1980).

Altman had enough footage to produce a four-hour film, and assistant director Alan Rudolph suggested he create an expanded version of Nashville to be shown in two parts, "Nashville Red" and "Nashville Blue", but the film ultimately remained intact. After a rush of critical acclaim, ABC expressed interest in a proposal for a 10-hour miniseries of Nashville, based on the footage not used in the final cut, but plans for the project were scrapped. The additional footage has not been made available on DVD releases.

However, in a 2000 interview with The A.V. Club, Altman disputed the claim that he had several hours worth of deleted scenes to cut another feature-length film (or two) out of. Altman claimed that there "were no deleted scenes" and that "almost everything we shot is in that film". Altman further stated the unseen, extra footage that wasn't used in the final cut of the film was mainly music and not much else.

=== Music ===
Many of the actors and actresses in the film composed the songs they performed in the film. Blakley wrote several tracks, including "Bluebird", performed by Timothy Brown, and "Tapedeck in His Tractor" and "My Idaho Home", performed by Blakley. Karen Black wrote "Memphis" and "Rolling Stone", the two songs she performed in the character of Connie White. Carradine wrote and performed "I'm Easy", which won an Academy Award for Best Original Song and a Golden Globe for Best Original Song - Motion Picture. Additionally, Carradine wrote "It Don't Worry Me", which is heard on the soundtrack throughout the film, and is the closing number performed by Barbara Harris onstage at the Parthenon.

Composer Richard Baskin composed songs for Henry Gibson to sing in character as Haven Hamilton. Several Nashville session musicians took part in the music recording and in the film, including violinist Vassar Clements and guitarist Harold Bradley. "Keep a Goin" was based on a poem Gibson recited on The Dick Van Dyke Show "Talk to the Snail" (Season 5, Episode 24).

While the music featured in the film was viewed in the Nashville music industry as mean-spirited satire, the songs have achieved a cult-status among alternative country musicians. In 2002, the album, A Tribute to Robert Altman's Nashville was released, featuring interpretations of the film's songs by Canadian alt-country figures, including Carolyn Mark, Kelly Hogan and Neko Case.

ABC Records issued a motion picture soundtrack to the film in 1975, featuring the various original musical numbers. It was reissued by MCA Nashville in 2015.

Non-album tracks

- "Yes, I Do", composed by Richard Baskin and Lily Tomlin; performed by Lily Tomlin
- "Down to the River", written and performed by Ronee Blakley
- "Let Me Be the One", written by Richard Baskin; performed by Gwen Welles
- "Sing a Song", written by Joe Raposo
- "The Heart of a Gentle Woman", written and performed by Dave Peel
- "The Day I Looked Jesus in the Eye", written by Richard Baskin and Robert Altman
- "I Don't Know If I Found It in You", written and performed by Karen Black
- "Swing Low, Sweet Chariot", traditional
- "Honey", written and performed by Keith Carradine
- "I Never Get Enough", written by Richard Baskin and Ben Raleigh; performed by Gwen Welles
- "Rose's Cafe", written and performed by Allan F. Nicholls
- "Old Man Mississippi", written by Juan Grizzle
- "My Baby's Cookin' in Another Man's Pan", written and performed by Jonnie Barnett
- "Since You've Gone", written by Gary Busey, performed by Allan F. Nicholls, Cristina Raines and Keith Carradine
- "Trouble in the U.S.A.", written by Arlene Barnett
- "In the Garden", written by C. Austin Miles, performed by Ronee Blakley

== Release ==
=== Box office ===
The film was a box-office success, with theatrical rentals of $6.8 million in North America by 1976. According to a piece in Film Comment, "it is still amazing to me that the impression was so prevalent in the cultural reaches of Manhattan that Nashville was one of the year's commercial blockbusters rather than, as it was, the twenty-seventh highest-grossing film of the year." The film grossed approximately $10 million in the United States.

=== Critical response ===
Nashville received significant attention from critics, with Patrick McGilligan of The Boston Globe writing that it was "perhaps the most talked about American movie since Orson Welles' Citizen Kane. Pauline Kael, film critic for The New Yorker, described it as "the funniest epic vision of America ever to reach the screen". Gene Siskel, Roger Ebert, and Leonard Maltin gave the film four-star reviews and called it the best film of 1975. In his original review, Ebert wrote "after I saw it I felt more alive, I felt I understood more about people, I felt somehow wiser. It's that good a movie." On August 6, 2000, Ebert included it in his The Great Movies compilation.

Vincent Canby of The New York Times praised the film's music as "funny, moving and almost nonstop" as well as its "well‐defined structure, [in which] individual sequences often burst with the kind of life that seems impossible to plan." Writing for the New York Daily News, Harry Haun praised the film's attention to detail and characterization, noting: "I have seen Nashville 4½ times, and I'm still discovering dimensions that had eluded me." Charles Champlin of the Los Angeles Times praised the humor, which he noted as ranging "from slapstick to satire", and commended the film as "the most original and provocative American movie in a very long time."

According to film critic Ruth McCormick, however, after an initial wave of praise, a critical backlash ensued. "Robert Mazzocco in The New York Review of Books, Greil Marcus in The Village Voice and John Malone in The New York Times wrote articles that ranged from debunking the hype and calling Nashville superficial and overrated, to absolutely hating the film for its aesthetic shortcomings or its purported pessimism, cynicism and sexism."

On the review aggregator website Rotten Tomatoes, 89% of 132 critics' reviews are positive, with an average rating of 9/10. The website's consensus reads: "Robert Altman captures the bravado and cynicism of the American dream in Nashville, a sprawling epic bursting with vivid performances and an unforgettable soundtrack." Metacritic, which uses a weighted average, assigned the film a score of 96 out of 100, based on 24 critics, indicating "universal acclaim".

=== Controversy ===
The film was widely despised by the mainstream country-music community at the time of its release; many artists believed it ridiculed their talent and sincerity. Altman felt they were mad because he chose not to use their music in favor of letting the actors compose their own material. However, he stated the movie has since become popular in the city among more recent generations.

The film garnered further attention in 1980 due to its climactic shooting scene of Barbara Jean, as it predated, but eerily mirrored, what would be the murder of John Lennon. In an interview on 2000 DVD release, Altman remarks that after Lennon's death, reporters questioned the director about Nashville and its harbinger of the assassination of a music star.

Robert Altman: "When John Lennon got assassinated, I got a call immediately from the Washington Post and they said, 'Do you feel responsible for this?' and I said 'What do you mean, responsible?' 'Well, I mean you're the one that predicted that there would be a political assassination of a star.' And I said 'Well, I don't feel responsible,' but I said, 'but don't you feel responsible for not heeding my warning?' The statement here is, these people are not assassinated because of their ideas or what they do. They're assassinated to draw attention to the assassin. And in political assassinations, in their sort of warped minds, they know that they are going to have a certain amount of people who said 'that son of a bitch [the politician] should have been shot,' because there's such heat about it. But actually what they are doing is killing somebody who's in the public eye and is some sort of an icon because this feeling that by doing that, committing that assassination they draw the attention to themselves, and they make themselves consequently important. Ah, and it's no surprise to me, the Lennon assassination, because this is what all that is, and I don't think we've seen the end of it either."

=== Home media ===
Paramount Home Video released Nashville on VHS and DVD in 2000. In 2013, The Criterion Collection released a Blu-ray edition of the film featuring a new scan and supplemental features, including an archival commentary with Altman as well as archival interviews, and a new documentary piece.

== Accolades ==
Nashville received numerous awards and nominations from various critical organizations, including a total of 11 Golden Globe nominations, which, as of 2025, are the most ever received by one film. It received four nominations in a single acting category; this was and remains unprecedented for major film award shows.

It won a BAFTA Film Award for Best Sound Track. Altman won for best director from: Cartagena Film Festival; Kansas City Film Critics Circle Awards; National Board of Review; National Society of Film Critics Awards; and the New York Film Critics Circle Awards. Lily Tomlin was awarded the New York Film Critics Circle for Best Supporting Actress. It became the first, and one of the eight (as of 2025) films to win Best Picture from three out of four major U.S. film critics' groups (LA, NBR, NY, NSFC) along with All the President's Men, Terms of Endearment, Goodfellas, Pulp Fiction, The Hurt Locker, Drive My Car, and Tár.

== Legacy ==
Plans were discussed for a sequel set 12 years later and titled Nashville 12, and most of the original players agreed to appear. In the script for the sequel, Lily Tomlin's character, Linnea, is running for political office; and Barnett now managing Connie White and obsessed with a Barbara Jean impersonator.

Contemporarily, Nashville is regarded in critical circles as Altman's magnum opus, as well as one of the greatest films of all time. In 1992, Nashville was selected for preservation in the United States National Film Registry by the Library of Congress as being "culturally, historically, or aesthetically significant". In 2007, the movie was ranked No. 59 on AFI's 100 Years... 100 Movies - 10th Anniversary Edition list; it did not appear on the original 1998 list. The song "I'm Easy" was named the 81st Best Song of All Time by the American Film Institute (AFI). In 2013, Entertainment Weekly ranked it the ninth-greatest film in history. Nashville ranked 14th in BBC's 2015 list of the 100 greatest American films. The February 2020 issue of New York Magazine lists Nashville as among "The Best Movies That Lost Best Picture at the Oscars."

== See also ==
- List of American films of 1975
- List of films featuring the deaf and hard of hearing
- Smile (1975 film) – a musical satire of small-town pageants in America.

== Sources ==
- Allon, Yoram; Cullen, Del; Patterson, Hannah (2002). Contemporary North American Film Directors: A Wallflower Critical Guide. Wallflower Press. ISBN 978-1-903-36452-9.
- Stuart, Jan (2003). The Nashville Chronicles: The Making of Robert Altman's Masterpiece. New York: Limelight. ISBN 978-0-879-10981-3.
