= Come Back to the Five and Dime, Jimmy Dean, Jimmy Dean =

Come Back to the Five and Dime, Jimmy Dean, Jimmy Dean may refer to:

- Come Back to the Five and Dime, Jimmy Dean, Jimmy Dean (play), a 1976 play by Ed Graczyk
- Come Back to the Five and Dime, Jimmy Dean, Jimmy Dean (film), a 1982 film adaptation directed by Robert Altman
