= Ann Ryerson =

American actress

- Born: August 15, 1949 (age 77); Fond du Lac, Wisconsin, U.S.
- Occupation: Actress
- Years active: 1978–present

Ann Ryerson (born August 15, 1949) is an American actress, who played Grace in Caddyshack (1980). She also appeared Friday the 13th Part VI: Jason Lives (1986) and Three of Hearts (1993).

She is based in Los Angeles, California.

== Filmography ==
=== Films ===
Year	Title	Role	Notes
1978	Getting Married	Telegram Girl	TV Movie
1978	A Wedding	Victoria Cory	
1979	Flatbed Annie & Sweetiepie: Lady Truckers	Elsie	TV Movie
1979	A Perfect Couple	Skye 147 Veterinarian	
1980	Caddyshack	Grace	
1980	Health	Dr. Ruth Ann Jackie	
1985	Pound Puppies	Mrs. Gloria Vandefeller	Uncredited
1986	Blind Justice	Leslie	
1986	Friday the 13th Part VI: Jason Lives	Katie	
1989	Troop Beverly Hills	Bitsy Barnfell	
1989	Love and Betrayal	Cynthia	TV Movie
1993	Three of Hearts	Jackie	
1995	The Late Shift	Betty Hudson	TV Movie
1999	Blast from the Past	Women Guest #1	
2002	Minority Report	Dr. Katherine James	
2004	First Daughter	Nurse Practitioner	
2005	Constantine	Old Woman on Bus	
2007	The Go-Getter	Visitor	
2009	Intervention	Rita	Short film
2010	Better People	Kari	TV Movie
2011	10 Years + 10 Minutes	Dr. Gertrude Hall	Short film
2012	The Last Anarchist	Jean	Short film

=== Television ===
Year	Title	Role	Notes
1979	Lou Grant	Debbie Dexter	1 episode
1981	One Day at a Time	Fran	1 episode
1981–1982	Private Benjamin	Pvt. Carol Winter	24 episodes
1985	Benson	Marjorie Manning	1 episode
1986	The Deliberate Stranger	Mrs. Hargreaves	2 episodes
1986	Sledge Hammer!	Isadora	1 episode
1987	The Hogan Family	Charlotte Morgan	1 episode
1987	Me & Mrs. C.	Tracy	1 episode
1987	Pound Puppies	Pound Owner / Pilot 2 (voice)	2 episodes
1988	My Two Dads	The Stage Mother	1 episode
1988	Eisenhower and Lutz	Officer Hoffa	1 episode
1988	CBS Summer Playhouse	Mother	1 episode
1988	My Sister Sam	Peggy Carmichael	1 episode
1988–1991	Empty Nest	Mrs. Patterson / Mrs. Bridges	2 episodes
1989	Murphy Brown	Rose	1 episode
1989	The Further Adventures of SuperTed	Additional Voices (voice)	13 episodes
1989	Till We Meet Again		2 episodes
1989	Designing Women	Teacher	1 episode
1989	Family Matters	Brooke Nash	1 episode
1991	Sons and Daughters	Elsie Steiger	1 episode
1995	Dream On	Mary Pat Wyatt Schultz	1 episode
1996	High Incident	Hillary Doe	1 episode
1997–2006	ER	Hillary Lerner / Oncology Doctor	2 episodes
1998	The Sylvester & Tweety Mysteries	Annie Taylor (voice)	1 episode
1998	Beyond Belief: Fact or Fiction	Mrs. Danby (segment "Murder on the Second Floor")	1 episode
1998	Love Boat: The Next Wave	Anne	1 episode
1999	Caroline in the City	Laura	1 episode
2000	The Huntress	Nosy Neighbor	1 episode
2000–2001	Grosse Pointe	Director	2 episodes
2001	The Division	Mrs. Linley	1 episode
2002	The Young and the Restless	Nancy Loomis	1 episode
2002	For the People	Francis	1 episode
2004	Strong Medicine		1 episode
2004–2011	Curb Your Enthusiasm	Nan Funkhouser	10 episodes
2006	The West Wing	Chief Justice	2 episodes
2007	Smith	Alice	1 episode
2008	Boston Legal	Caryl Hutchins	1 episode
2008	Desperate Housewives	Debby	1 episode
2009	Mad Men	Elsa Kittridge	1 episode
2011	Paul the Male Matchmaker	Renee	4 episodes
2012	Grey's Anatomy	Dr. Margaret Goodwin	1 episode
2014	Kroll Show		1 episode
2018	Millennial Mafia	Claire	1 episode
2022–2023	Good Trouble	Andrea	2 episodes
2025	Palm Royale	Dominique de Marché	1 episode
