= Come Back to the 5 & Dime, Jimmy Dean, Jimmy Dean =

1982 film by Robert Altman

- Original theatrical poster
- Directed by: Robert Altman
- Screenplay by: Ed Graczyk
- Based on: Come Back to the 5 & Dime, Jimmy Dean, Jimmy Dean by Ed Graczyk
- Produced by: Scott Bushnell
- Starring: Sandy Dennis; Cher; Karen Black; Sudie Bond; Mark Patton; Kathy Bates
- Cinematography: Pierre Mignot
- Edited by: Jason Rosenfield
- Production companies: Mark Goodson Productions; Viacom Enterprises; Sandcastle 5
- Distributed by: Cinecom International Films
- Release dates: September 30, 1982 (Chicago International Film Festival); November 12, 1982 (U.S.)
- Running time: 109 minutes
- Country: United States
- Language: English
- Budget: $850,000
- Box office: $2.3 million

Come Back to the 5 & Dime, Jimmy Dean, Jimmy Dean is a 1982 American comedy-drama film directed by Robert Altman. An adaptation of Ed Graczyk's 1976 play of the same name, the film stars Sandy Dennis, Cher, Karen Black, Sudie Bond, Mark Patton, Marta Heflin and Kathy Bates, all of whom reprise their roles from the 1982 Broadway production of the play which Altman also directed. As in the Broadway production, the film takes place inside a Woolworth's five-and-dime store in a small Texas town, where an all-female fan club for actor James Dean reunites in 1975. According to a 2014 interview with playwright Ed Graczyk, the setting of the play is actually an "H.L. Kressmont Five and Dime", inspired by the real-life S.H. Kress & Co.. Through a series of flashbacks, the six members also reveal secrets dating back to 1955.

Jimmy Dean was the first of several feature adaptations of plays by Altman in the 1980s, after the director's departure from Hollywood. It was screened at various film festivals in North America and Europe, and won the top prize at the 1982 Chicago International Film Festival. It was well-received by critics, who praised Altman's direction and the performances by the female cast. This was the first release for New York–based independent outlet Cinecom Pictures, which Altman chose over a major studio "to guarantee a long play" in art-house venues.

== Plot ==
Early on September 30, 1975, in McCarthy, Texas, at a Woolworth's five-and-dime store, its owner Juanita listens to gospel music on the radio. She gets ready for the day, opens the store, and addresses someone as "Jimmy Dean". The all-female fan club Disciples of James Dean is having a reunion meeting at the store, to honor the twentieth anniversary of the actor's death. Disciple Sissy comes in tardy; she had been helping out at the truck stop. Juanita says that more members could arrive soon: Disciple Mona ought to have already been there, but her bus is running far behind schedule. Sissy worries about the weather, as it is "118 degrees in the shade".

The story flashes back to a stormy night in 1955. Sissy shelters inside the store and asks after three employees who are friends of hers: Mona, Sydney, and Joseph "Joe" Qualley. Joe is there, busy stocking new issues of Photoplay magazine. Mona arrives, having been delayed by the weather. Sissy, Mona, and Joe go up to the front counter and sing the contemporary doo-wop song "Sincerely". Juanita is chagrined, as she only approves of gospel music.

The main storyline returns. Disciples Stella Mae and Edna Louise make their way to the five-and-dime; they have one of the red jackets that the club members used to wear. Mona joins them and explains that her bus had broken down and required repair. Amidst the excited reunion celebration, she looks at a group picture made with James Dean. Mona recalls the last time that the Disciples—all dressed in their jackets—had come together.

Mona's 20-year-old memory segues into another flashback. Mona has recently moved back to McCarthy from college, claiming that the atmosphere at college had inflamed her asthma and led to an attack, with her doctors then advising her to return to McCarthy. Later, the overjoyed Disciples find Sissy and break the news that Elizabeth Taylor, Rock Hudson, and James Dean will be in Marfa, Texas, to film Giant—62 miles away from McCarthy. Auditions for extra cast members will be carried out across the area. Mona idolizes Dean and she dreams of playing beside him in the film. Joe drives her to Marfa so she can fulfill her desire.

In the modern storyline, Mona claims that when she went to Marfa, Dean chose her to bear his son, and on that night he fathered her child Jimmy Dean. She says that her boy Jimmy Dean is mentally deficient, and she isolates him from the community. Sissy says that Mona has been "warped and demented" to hide her son. Mona loses her temper and insults Sissy, who goes outside to "cool off".

A Porsche sports car roars into town and its driver peers in through the storefront window. Mona and Juanita greet the window shopper, who identifies herself as Joanne. She had seen writing on an old highway sign that noted Dean's son was to be found at the store. The Disciples learn that Joanne was formerly Joe Qualley, the only male who had been a part of their social circle.

The story flashes back to a young Joanne—as Joe—recounting the events some days after a McCarthy High School dance, which Joe had attended wearing a dress. Leicester T, a boy their age who had an ambiguous tryst with Joanne on that night before finding out she was in fact 'Joe' crossdressing, assaulted and dragged Joe to a graveyard before proceeding to assault her while locals from the town jeered behind a fence. All this is recounted to Mona and Sissy by a young 'Joe,' with them tending to the bruises and wounds on his face. Unable to recount what Leicester T proceeded to do whilst spreading him over a gravestone and pulling down his overalls, Joe is only able to scream how he kept calling him Joanne.

The Disciples in 1975 have just heard the story. Stella Mae asks whether Joanne is "half-man, half-woman"—a hermaphrodite, in case people ask. Joanne says that she had a sex-change operation thirteen years ago and, when pressed by Stella, remarks that she can simply call her 'a freak,' as her friends are more likely to understand the term.

Later that day, Juanita thinks she hears thunder and she warns the Disciples to brace themselves for stormy weather. But the noise was from a loud sports car motor—Mona's son Jimmy Dean had stolen Joanne's Porsche and was racing its engine. Joanne phones the Texas Highway Patrol to tell them about Jimmy Dean, which triggers a final storyline transition.

The Disciples of yesteryear listen as a man on the radio announces that an automobile accident has killed 24-year-old Hollywood film star James Dean. The girls pledge to hold a vigil.

The 1975 reunion winds down among further questions and answers. Mona remarks again how, as soon as she tried to leave McCarthy, she almost died from asthma attacks, so she has found the town's warm and dry atmosphere to be vital. She then goes on to reminisce about her part as an extra on the set of Giant, which the others have never been able to find in the film. Meanwhile, certain details from her two accounts combine to clearly indicate that Joanne is in fact the father of Mona's son, as Sissy reveals that the young Jimmy Dean has never seen a doctor, and is probably unencumbered by any disability. In the fallout from the revelation, The Disciples drink together, laughing, and make a pact to hold another reunion in another twenty years; Mona alone demurs. Left alone, she, Sissy, and Joanne stand together before the mirrors as they had done before, and again sing "Sincerely" in concert. The song fades into blowing wind over shots of a decrepit, decayed, abandoned five-and-dime store building as the film ends.

== Cast ==
- Sandy Dennis as Mona
- Cher as Sissy
- Karen Black as Joanne
- Sudie Bond as Juanita
- Marta Heflin as Edna Louise
- Kathy Bates as Stella Mae
- Mark Patton as Joe Qualley
- Caroline Aaron as Martha
- Ruth Miller as Clarissa
- Gena Ramsel as Sue Ellen
- Ann Risley as Phyllis Marie
- Dianne Turley Travis as Alice Ann

== Production ==
After directing 1980's critically panned Popeye and selling his Lion's Gate studio (not to be confused with Lionsgate), Altman turned his attention to the stage. One of his first tasks in this field was acquiring and directing Ed Graczyk's Come Back to the 5 & Dime, Jimmy Dean, Jimmy Dean, a drama originally performed in Columbus, Ohio in 1976. Altman's work on the play, despite its bad reviews and short run, convinced him that a film version was imminent. "On stage it was humorous and bawdy," he commented. "On film it's more emotional." Jimmy Dean was his first feature adaptation of a play; he followed this effort with 1983's Streamers and 1987's Beyond Therapy, among others.

Altman then made a deal with the play's production executive, Peter Newman, and retained the original cast members. The filmmaker received over US$800,000 from Viacom Enterprises, through game show company Mark Goodson Productions, almost as much money as the play had cost him. It was his intention to shoot Jimmy Dean for the cinema; "the initial press report that it was made for cable is not true," he said.

Of his preparations for Jimmy Dean, Altman added, "I didn't do what they told me I had to do, I hired the people I wanted." The production was his first to involve Pierre Mignot, a Canadian cinematographer; they would collaborate on five more films. Filming took place on just one set: a "redressed" version of its Broadway counterpart. Altman used Super 16 equipment during the nineteen-day shoot; this was later converted to 35 mm stock for the first answer print. For the film's flashbacks, he built a double set with two-way mirrors that were controlled by computerized lighting techniques—which became problematic for both him and the film's critics.

== Release ==
Altman took Come Back to the 5 & Dime, Jimmy Dean, Jimmy Dean to the Montreal and Toronto film festivals in Canada, as well as those in Belgium, Venice and Deauville. The film received its U.S. premiere on September 30, 1982 (the 27th anniversary of the late James Dean's death) at the Chicago International Film Festival, where it received a ten-minute standing ovation. After this screening, Altman discussed various aspects of the production during a question-and-answer session.

The filmmaker refused to let any major U.S. studio handle Come Back to the 5 & Dime, Jimmy Dean, Jimmy Dean, due to the problems he had with 20th Century-Fox over his 1979 production HealtH. Instead, he enlisted Cinecom Pictures, an independent distributor in New York City, to open it in arthouse theaters "to guarantee a long play"; it became the first release for that company.

=== Home media ===
Jimmy Dean aired on the Showtime cable network in May 1983. Embassy Home Entertainment released it on VHS that same year, and on laserdisc in 1984; a video re-issue from Virgin Vision followed in June 1989. It was released on Blu-ray on November 18, 2014, by Olive Films, under license from Paramount Pictures.

=== Restoration and re-release ===
A restored version of the film was released in 2011. The film was restored by the UCLA Film & Television Archive (in cooperation with Sandcastle 5 Productions) as "the first fruit of a new, larger project ... to preserve Mr. Altman's artistic legacy." The preservation was funded by the Hollywood Foreign Press Association and The Film Foundation.

The new print was made "from the original Super-16mm color negative, a 35mm CRI, a 35mm print, and the original ½ inch analog discreet mono D-M-E track."

The restoration premiered at the UCLA Festival of Preservation on March 3, 2011 and was screened at other North American cities in 2011 including New York City, Chicago, and Vancouver.

== Reception ==
=== Box office ===
The film opened on a limited basis in just two theaters on November 12, 1982, grossing $22,298 and placing 18th at the North American box office that weekend. By its fourth week, it made $177,500 after expanding to four venues; during its entire run, it grossed $840,958.

=== Critical response ===
On its original release, The Boston Globe's Michael Blowen hailed Jimmy Dean as "[Altman's] best film since Nashville". He added, "[The director] is having fun again. He seems more comfortable in a desolate Woolworth's than he did on the frozen tundra of Quintet. In contrast with A Wedding, in which Altman cynically patronized his characters, he seems to love these three women. And why not?" The Associated Press' Bob Thomas said, "The film is a heartening example of how good writing ..., gifted direction and solid acting can produce something worthwhile on a tiny (under $1 million) budget."

The New York Times' Vincent Canby gave Jimmy Dean a mixed review. "There are some interesting things about [the film]," he observed, "but they have less to do with anything on the screen than with the manner in which the film was produced and with Mr. Altman's unflagging if misguided faith in the project." He complained that "The actresses are not treated kindly, either by the material or by the camera," and noted that Sandy Dennis' character, Mona, received most of the close-ups. "The only person in the film who comes off well," he said, "is Miss [Sudie] Bond." New York's David Denby wrote: "Altman uses cinema to celebrate theater, and his technique is so fluidly self-assured that he almost makes you forget the rubbishy situations and lines created by playwright Ed Graczyk. Almost, but not quite."

Roger Ebert of the Chicago Sun-Times gave the film three stars out of four and wrote: "This is not a great drama, but two things make the movie worth seeing: Altman's visual inventiveness and the interesting performances given by everyone in the cast." Gene Siskel of the Chicago Tribune gave the film two-and-a-half stars out of four and wrote that "only the Karen Black character develops any appealing substance, and Altman must share the credit for that with Black herself, who turns in the film's best performance. Cher's role is nothing more than a country-western sketch. Surprisingly, she isn't bad, and I suspect that this explains the plaudits her performance has earned."

Pauline Kael wrote in 5001 Nights at the Movies: "When Robert Altman gives a project everything he's got, his skills are such that he can make poetry out of fake poetry and magic out of fake magic. Moving in apparent freedom, the principal actresses ... go at their roles so creatively that they find some kind of acting truth in what they're doing. They bring conviction to their looneytunes characters." Film critic Leonard Maltin gave Jimmy Dean two and a half stars out of four in his Movie Guide, writing, "Strong performances, and Altman's lively approach to filming [Graczyk's] Broadway play can't completely hide the fact that this is second-rate material." Halliwell's Film Guide stated "[Jimmy Dean] descends from cynicism through gloom to hysteria and is never very revealing."

At the Chicago premiere of Jimmy Dean, Altman spoke of its festival acclaim to his audience: "I never have had a film of mine received as well as this film—I don't understand it, but I like it!" In a January 1983 interview with the Boston Globe, he stated that "The critical reaction doesn't surprise me. Nothing surprises me any more. I take that back. One thing surprised me when I showed Jimmy Dean at film festivals—no one walked out."

Jimmy Dean won the Best Film Award at the Chicago International Film Festival, as well as a Best Screenplay Award at the Belgium International Film Festival. Cher, who played Sissy in the film, received a Golden Globe nomination for Best Supporting Actress in a Motion Picture.

Come Back to the 5 & Dime, Jimmy Dean, Jimmy Dean currently holds an 86% rating on Rotten Tomatoes based on seven reviews.

== Themes and criticism ==
Come Back to the 5 & Dime, Jimmy Dean, Jimmy Dean has been noted to address the subject of feminism. In Robert Altman: Hollywood Survivor, Daniel O'Brien wrote that "[Jimmy Dean] is in part an attempt to explore the way women are forced to suppress their emotions and personalities in order to be accepted by the male-dominated society around them". In his 1980 book A Cinema of Loneliness: Penn, Kubrick, Coppola, Scorsese, Altman, film historian and critic Robert P. Kolker noted that Come Back to the 5 & Dime dealt with the "crisis of women confronting the oppression of patriarchy by dissolving them into neuroses. Unable to struggle, these figures first collapse within themselves and then extrapolate their delusions as protections against the world that surrounds them."

On the film's sexuality issues, Robin Wood said: "What is especially interesting about Come Back to the Five and Dime is the connection it makes between the oppression of women and patriarchy's dread of sexual deviation and gender ambiguity. Joe (the only male character to appear in the film, in flashback) is clearly (and sympathetically) presented as feminine (as opposed to the stereotypically effeminate), woman-identified, and gay; as Don Short has perceptively shown, the film implies that he has become a transsexual ... because his society had no place for a gay male."

In his 1985 book on Altman, Gerard Plecki wrote: "The reference to the James Dean myth is a clue to Altman's pervasive film message. Altman knows that James Dean had the kind of screen presence and magic that caused people to 'give in' to cinema." He added that "In each film [the director] strives to reinforce and respond to that essential need—to give in to cinema." Plecki observed that "It is fascinating that, after The James Dean Story, Altman would select another project touching upon the life of [the late actor]."

O'Brien criticized the character development of the supporting roles, while Plecki said that, compared to those in previous Altman films, none of the characters "are immediately likable". "The reasons for the limited appeal of the characters are quite complex," Plecki wrote. "Most of the women's problems are physical or sexual ones."

In Jimmy Dean, Altman frequently uses mirrors as a device to seamlessly connect scenes between the present and the past. Reflections in mirrors are part of many of the film's frame compositions. As noted by Daniel O'Brien in Robert Altman: Hollywood Survivor, they "[become] a window into 1955, enabling the characters to gaze into the past".

== See also ==
- List of American films of 1982
- List of LGBT-related films

== Sources ==
- Erskine, Thomas L.; Welsh, James Michael; Tibbetts, John C. (2000). "Come Back to the 5 & Dime, Jimmy Dean, Jimmy Dean (1976)". Video Versions: Film Adaptations of Plays on Video. Greenwood Publishing Group. ISBN 978-0-3133-0185-8.
- Graczyk, Ed (1989). A Murder of Crows: A Play in Two Acts. Samuel French, Inc. ISBN 978-0-5736-9111-9.
- Gritten, David, ed. (2007). "Come Back to the Five and Dime, Jimmy Dean, Jimmy Dean". Halliwell's Film Guide 2008. Hammersmith, London: HarperCollins. ISBN 978-0-00-726080-5.
- Kael, Pauline (August 2, 2011). 5001 Nights at the Movies. New York: Henry Holt. ISBN 978-1-2500-3357-4.
- Maltin, Leonard (2007). "Come Back to the Five and Dime, Jimmy Dean, Jimmy Dean". Leonard Maltin's Movie Guide 2008. Signet Books. ISBN 978-0-451-22186-5.
- O'Brien, Daniel (1995). Robert Altman: Hollywood Survivor. New York: Continuum. ISBN 978-0-7134-7481-7.
- Niemi, Robert (2016). "In the Wilderness". The Cinema of Robert Altman: Hollywood Maverick. Columbia University Press. doi:10.7312/niem17626. ISBN 978-0-231-85086-5. JSTOR 10.7312/niem17626.
- Pierson, John; Smith, Kevin (1995). Spike, Mike, Slackers & Dykes: A Guided Tour Across a Decade of American Independent Cinema. Miramax Books. ISBN 0-7868-8222-0.
- Plecki, Gerard (1985). Robert Altman. Boston: Twayne Publishers. ISBN 978-0-8057-9303-1.
- Sterritt, David (2000). Robert Altman: Interviews. University Press of Mississippi. ISBN 978-1-5780-6187-7.
- Wood, Robin (July 10, 2003). Hollywood from Vietnam to Reagan...and Beyond (Second ed.). Columbia University Press. ISBN 978-0-2315-0757-8.
