= Marta Heflin =

American actress

- Born: Michelle Heflin; March 29, 1945; Washington, D.C., U.S.
- Died: September 18, 2013 (aged 68); Manhattan, NY, U.S.
- Occupation: Actress

Marta Heflin (March 29, 1945 – September 18, 2013) was an American actress who appeared in several Robert Altman films, including Come Back to the Five and Dime, Jimmy Dean, Jimmy Dean and A Perfect Couple. Known for her waifish appearance, Heflin also acted in various New York stage musicals prior to her film career, such as Fiddler on the Roof, Hair, and Jesus Christ Superstar.

Marta was the daughter of American theatre producer and journalist Julia Heflin and public relations executive Martin Heflin. She was the niece of Oscar-winning actor Van Heflin and actress Frances Heflin, and the first cousin of director Jonathan Kaplan.

After struggling with prolonged illness, Heflin died in Manhattan at the age of 68. In 2014, the Marta Heflin Foundation, a private grant-making foundation that supports the work of other charitable organizations, was set up as part of her legacy.

== Film career ==
After appearing in a number of stage musicals in New York in the 1960s and 70s, Heflin made her transition to the small screen in the soap opera The Doctors. Next came a supporting role as Quentin in Frank Pierson's 1976 remake of A Star Is Born, starring Barbra Streisand and Kris Kristofferson. After working with director Robert Altman in the comedy of manners A Wedding (1978), Heflin was handpicked to replace actress Sandy Dennis in the role of Sheila Shea, a rock singer who dates an older Greek-American businessman after meeting him through a videotape computer dating service, in Altman's film A Perfect Couple (1979).

In the 1980s, Heflin appeared in two TV movies: Playing for Time (1980), a drama set in a concentration camp starring Vanessa Redgrave, and The Gentleman Bandit (1981), which followed a priest falsely accused of a string of armed robberies. In 1982, Heflin reunited with Altman for the Broadway production of Ed Graczyk's play Come Back to the Five and Dime, in which she played Edna Louise, a member of an all-female fan club named the Disciples of James Dean. She reprised the role in Altman's film adaptation of the play later that year.

== Legacy ==
In 2014, the Marta Heflin Foundation was established to support the work of other charitable organizations. Heflin's private Foundation has since awarded PAWS NY with a $10,000 grant for its Foster and Emergency Care Program, which provides care for pets whose guardians are facing health emergencies of their own.

== Filmography ==
Film and television
Year	Title	Role	Notes
1969	The Doctors	Shana Golan	Regular role, 38 episodes
1976	A Star Is Born	Quentin	
1978	A Wedding	Shelby Munker	
1979	A Perfect Couple	Sheila Shea	
1980	Playing for Time	Esther	TV movie
1981	The Gentleman Bandit	Marie	TV movie
1982	Come Back to the 5 & Dime, Jimmy Dean, Jimmy Dean	Edna Louise	
1982	The King of Comedy	Young Girl	(final film role)
