= McDonald's African American Heritage Series =

Spoken word recording

Album cover

The McDonald's African American Heritage Series is a cassette tape released in 1991 by McDonald's, featuring prominent African-Americans performing readings/songs involving African-American history.

== Tracks ==
=== Side A: Black Pioneers ===
1. Avery Brooks – Introduction
2. Judith Jamison – Katherine Dunham
3. Maya Angelou – Langston Hughes
4. Melba Moore – Arturo Schomburg
5. Patti Austin – Bessie Smith

=== Side B: Black Rights, Black Justice ===
1. D-NICE – Buffalo Soldiers
2. Percy Sutton – Tuskegee Airmen
3. Keshia Knight-Pulliam – Daisy Bates
4. David Dinkins – Politicians of the Reconstruction
5. MC Lyte – Underground Railroad
6. Avery Brooks – Closing Statement

== Credits ==
- Artwork: Saki Mafundikwa
- Scriptwriter: Ann Ashwood
- Music: Jana Productions, NAJEE & RIZE
- Publisher: TRO-LUDLOW MUSIC INC
- Produced by Deborah McDuffie
- Executive Produced by Marc Strachan
