= Health (film) =

1980 ensemble comedy film directed by Robert Altman

HealtH
- An advertisement for the film in The New York Times, April 1982
- Directed by: Robert Altman
- Written by: Frank Barhydt; Robert Altman; Paul Dooley
- Produced by: Robert Altman
- Starring: Carol Burnett; Glenda Jackson; James Garner; Lauren Bacall; Paul Dooley; Alfre Woodard
- Cinematography: Edmond L. Koons
- Edited by: Tony Lombardo; Dennis Hill; Tom Benko
- Music by: Joseph Byrd
- Production company: Lion's Gate Films
- Distributed by: 20th Century-Fox
- Release dates: September 12, 1980 (Los Angeles, California)
- Running time: 105 minutes
- Country: United States
- Language: English
- Budget: US$6 million

HealtH (also known as Health and H.E.A.L.T.H.) is a 1980 American ensemble comedy film, the seventeenth feature project from director Robert Altman. It stars Carol Burnett, Glenda Jackson, James Garner, Lauren Bacall, and Paul Dooley, and was written by Altman, Dooley and Frank Barhydt. The film's title is an acronym for "Happiness, Energy, and Longevity through Health".

A parody and satire of the U.S. political scene of the time, HealtH is set at a health food convention at a Florida luxury hotel, where a powerful political organization is deciding on a new president. The election is rife with backroom deals and scandal; a businessman, Colonel Cody, is out to rig the votes and the outcome. Dick Cavett and Dinah Shore, two television talk show personalities of the time, are mentioned prominently in the film.

HealtH was made by Robert Altman's company, Lion's Gate Films (no relation to Lionsgate Films), in early 1979. It was the director's last film for the 20th Century-Fox studio, which shelved its official release for over two years. Despite this, it received festival showings and a brief Los Angeles run during 1980. The film was broadcast on various U.S. television stations over the years, including The Movie Channel and Fox Movie Channel, but it has never been issued on home video.

== Plot ==
Bearing similarities to Altman's 1975 film Nashville, along with a plotless structure, HealtH chronicles the progress of a health-food convention held at a luxury hotel in St Pete Beach, Florida. As the convention takes place, the members of an organization called HealtH hold a campaign to find out who will become its President. (Their name stands for "Happiness, Energy and Longevity through Health"; it also serves as their slogan.) The candidates are Esther Brill, an 83-year-old afflicted with narcolepsy who calls herself "the first lady of health"; Isabella Garnell, who is serious against commercialism and materialism; and Dr. Harold (Gil) Gainey, a salesperson-turned-independent.

On the first day of the conference, The Steinettes (a female quartet dressed in green and yellow) introduce Dick Cavett, who is hosting his show on location and covering the details of the event. He interviews Gloria Burbank and Esther Brill, two of the candidates competing for the new Presidency of the HealtH organization. Burbank, a White House representative, has been sent to this venue on the President of the United States' behalf. Later that day at the hotel lounge, Burbank's ex-husband Harry Wolff plans to reschedule the Cavett interview, due to difficulties with Brill during her profile. The moment Burbank heads to her room, Gil Gainey (a minor candidate) stops her and debates on the worth of her strategy.

On the morning of the second day, several conventioneers notice a seemingly dead body sunk to the bottom of the pool from their balconies. Harry Wolff and the President's advisor on health, Gloria Burbank, are chatting by the deep end of the pool. Gloria then dives into the pool, not realizing there is a body floating on the bottom. As she approaches it, she finally sees it and screams in fear, heading back to the surface. Some other men dive in to rescue the drowned body, but it turns out that Gainey had been using an oxygen tank in order to play a publicity stunt.

That night, Garnell announces a serious message from the top of the hotel through her loudspeaker; many guests take notice, and some complain. Around that time, a businessperson named Colonel Cody arrives at the conference, and heads to Garnell's room to interrogate and find out her plans.

Next morning, Harry finds out that Burbank is beginning to support Garnell, and thinks that this is not right. Later on, while discussing breastfeeding and abortion with Brill, Burbank is astonished that Garnell and Brill were actually born male. After serving in the Navy, both had sex change operations in 1960. Bobby Hammer, a dirty tricks specialist, actually concocted this revelation to trick Burbank.

After another discussion with Brill, Burbank enters the empty convention hall, where Cody interrupts her. He finds her title, and the ideals of the HealtH organization, worthless. Ashamed and in tears, Burbank is shocked that he controls not only HealtH, but also the ongoing election; he even plans to rig the votes and the outcome. She runs back to tell Wolff on Cody's scheme. As the couple start making love, Burbank is worried that it will be all over for her if Garnell wins. Harry, however, assures her that Garnell is still a woman anyway.

On the fourth and final day, the results of the HealtH election are announced live on Cavett's show, and Esther Brill comes out as the victor. Burbank and her ex-husband watch on from their balcony outside, and also take a glimpse at Cody proposing an offer to Brill. Some time later, Cody, who turns out to be her harmless nut brother, gets into a fit of anger, knocking down everything in his path, and demands to get away immediately.

With the HealtH convention over, another one involving hypnotists is taking root at the hotel. Before he and the candidates leave, Cavett briefly greets Dinah Shore, the host on hand for this event. As the HealtH sign is taken down in front of the hotel, the Steinettes perform a Broadway-style show tune that closes the film.

== Cast ==
Name	Character	Description	Source
Carol Burnett	Gloria Burbank	A candidate for the HealtH election, and a White House representative. She becomes sexually aroused whenever she is frightened. Burnett appeared in another Altman film, 1979's A Wedding.	
Lauren Bacall	Esther Brill	An 83-year-old virgin who is the most popular pick for the election; her motto is "Feel Yourself". Suffering from narcolepsy, she drifts into sleep every time she tries finishing a sentence, and also believes that orgasms shorten a woman's life by 28 days.	
Glenda Jackson	Isabella Garnell	Brill's rival in the HealtH campaign, she borrows her speeches from Illinois governor Adlai Stevenson and commits her thoughts to a tape recorder.	
James Garner	Harry Wolff	Gloria Burbank's ex-husband, and Esther Brill's campaign manager.	
Paul Dooley	Dr. Gil Gainey	A salesperson for "Vita-Sea", a powdered kelp product. Twice in the film, he pretends to drown in a pool in order to receive publicity, after his part in the campaign gets little attention. His character is similar to John Triplette in Altman's Nashville. Dooley co-scripted HealtH along with Altman and Barhydt.	
Henry Gibson	Bobby Hammer	Specializes in dirty tricks in the political field. To convince Burbank that Garnell is a transsexual, he disguises himself as a female navy officer.	
Alfre Woodard	Sally Benbow	An African-American, and the hotel's public relations director. At one point in the film, she observes that the convention's guests may not be as healthy as they seem.	
Donald Moffat	Colonel Cody	A businessperson who claims to own not only the convention, but the government as well. He is actually Esther Brill's brother, Lester.	
Dick Cavett	Himself	A talk show host at hand for the coverage of the HealtH events.	
Dinah Shore	Herself	Appears at the end of the film in a small cameo, as she prepares for a hypnotists' convention.	
Nancy Foster	Gilda Hoffintz	A Jewish model who is also Bobby Hammer's girlfriend	
Nathalie Blossom	The Steinettes	An a cappella quartet from Greenwich Village, New York, who are dressed in different outfits during the convention. Gerard Plecki calls their songs "ironic commentary on the health crisis implied in the film".	
Julie Janney	The Steinettes	An a cappella quartet from Greenwich Village, New York, who are dressed in different outfits during the convention. Gerard Plecki calls their songs "ironic commentary on the health crisis implied in the film".	
Patty Katz	The Steinettes	An a cappella quartet from Greenwich Village, New York, who are dressed in different outfits during the convention. Gerard Plecki calls their songs "ironic commentary on the health crisis implied in the film".	
Diane Shaffer	The Steinettes	An a cappella quartet from Greenwich Village, New York, who are dressed in different outfits during the convention. Gerard Plecki calls their songs "ironic commentary on the health crisis implied in the film".	

== Production ==
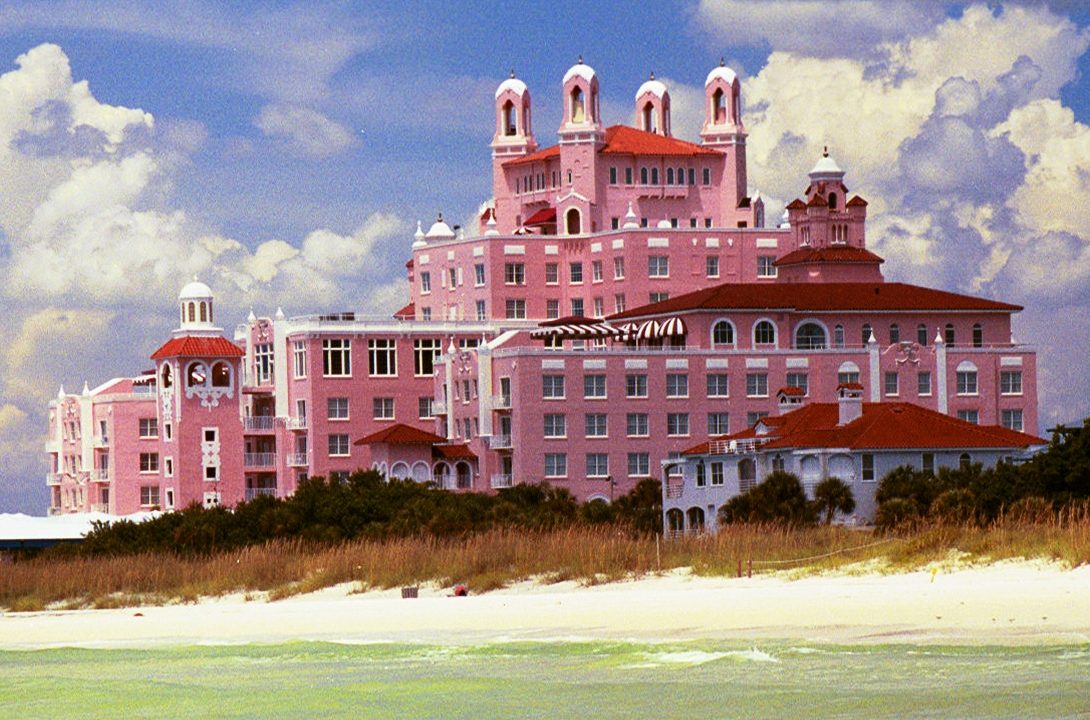
Robert Altman shot HealtH at the Don CeSar hotel, St Petersburg Beach, Florida.

Under the supervision of Alan Ladd, Jr., head of 20th Century-Fox, director Robert Altman made HealtH for US$6 million through his Lion's Gate Films company (unrelated to the present-day firm based in Vancouver). At the time, Altman had commitments to deliver films for Fox until 1981; HealtH was his fifteenth feature project. "[Alan] had great faith in me," he told David Sterritt in 2000; "he put his own job on the line." Of the film's timing, he said, "HealtH could have only been made when it was made, and that was the end of the Carter era." This and 1979's Quintet were Altman's first collaborations with writer Frank Barhydt; the two would later work on the 1988 HBO miniseries Tanner '88, as well as 1993's Short Cuts and 1996's Kansas City.

In response to the diminishing box office returns of his last three efforts (A Wedding, Quintet and A Perfect Couple), and in case any delays could put a damper on his financing, Altman rushed HealtH into production. The film was shot in sequence at only one location: the Don CeSar Beach Hotel in St Pete Beach, Florida. Production began on February 20, 1979, and continued for three months. The crew chose the Don CeSar, said Altman, because "we felt [this] would be fun, with lots of crazy situations and off-beat characters." Joseph Byrd worked on the music score, along with supervisor Allan Nicholls.

To capture the authenticity of the convention in the movie, art director Bob Quinn and co-writer Frank Barhydt visited an actual one in Boston, Massachusetts before shooting. Over one hundred health food companies contributed to the set. One of them, Sovex Granola, participated during the shoot; their scenes did not make it into the finished film, but they received end-credit billing.

Robert Altman was known to wear different hats on every new production of his; on the set of HealtH, he wore a straw one. While filming, Altman got into a conflict with members of the local Teamsters branch, and had to pay "outrageous salaries" for certification.

Garner recalled "we had a lot of fun making it... I loved Bob Altman."

A short while after HealtH finished production, producer Robert Evans hired Altman for a musical version of Popeye, co-produced by Paramount Pictures and Walt Disney Productions. Altman went to Malta to shoot the film, and brought the Steinettes from HealtH along with him.

== Release ==
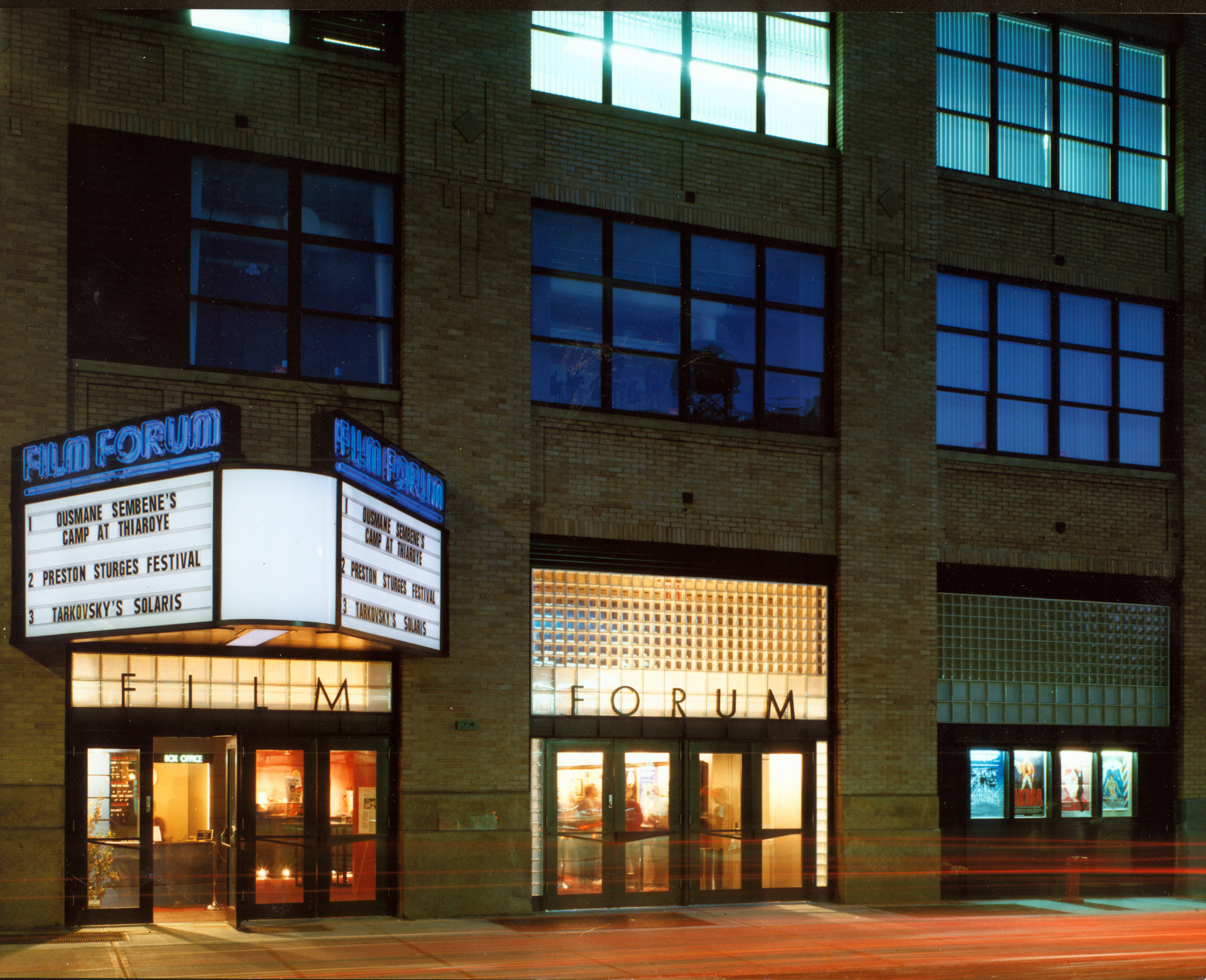
New York's Film Forum screened HealtH in April 1982.

Distributor 20th Century-Fox originally planned HealtH for a Christmas 1979 release. But by the time editing was complete, a change of management took place at the studio, and Alan Ladd, Jr. was among those to leave; as a result, Fox shelved the film. After canceling plans for a March debut in January 1980, they moved it to their summer schedule; Altman's strategy was to have the film released in time for that year's presidential campaign.

Before that could take place, the company's new president, Norman B. Levy, planned an April 1980 run in St. Louis, Missouri. Altman went against it and suggested test runs in four markets instead: San Francisco and Sacramento, California; Houston, Texas; and Boston, Massachusetts. The resulting previews played to poor audience response, and some time later, Fox deemed it uncommercial for release. In the end, the company replaced it on their schedule with Oh! Heavenly Dog, a crime comedy starring Chevy Chase and Benji the dog.

Save for Sherry Lansing, who loved the film, Robert Altman had a fallout with Fox personnel over their handling of HealtH. After filming Popeye, Altman tried to contact Norman Levy on its status. The filmmaker complained, "[Levy] didn't return my phone calls for seven weeks. That's just basic rudeness. I don't think he knows what a movie is anyway." Moreover, he said of the studio's distribution unit: "Norman Levy and the rest are scum. [...] They're not interested in movies. They're interested in ski lifts and Coca-Cola."

Amid this situation, Altman began to distribute HealtH on his own by taking it to the film festival circuit. The comedy was screened at the Montreal World Film Festival in August 1980, and later appeared at Telluride and Venice. Of the response at those venues, the director said: "It has a love-hate reaction—but what's wrong with that?"

By September 1980, the festival exposure prompted 20th Century-Fox to hold over a month of preview screenings at the UA Theater in Westwood, Los Angeles; a nationwide release was also considered. Despite even worse acclaim this time, Altman remarked that this run "did respectable business, considering that there was no advertising. But it's finished, dead, buried." Ultimately, HealtH would be Altman's last film for Fox; his experiences would later convince him to skip major distribution for Come Back to the Five and Dime, Jimmy Dean, Jimmy Dean.

On March 7, 1981, a 16 mm print of HealtH was shown at the facilities of Northwestern University in Evanston, Illinois. The film also received a screening in Baltimore, Maryland, on March 28. On April 7, 1982, it received its official cinema opening at the Film Forum 1 in New York City.

The film was released in at least two European markets: in Germany under the title Der Gesundheitskongress, and in the United Kingdom, where prints ran a few minutes longer than the original U.S. cut.

HealtH aired on the Philadelphia-based PRISM pay-TV service in February 1981, and also on the national U.S. outlet The Movie Channel that same year. The film was also broadcast on the CBS network in August 1983. As of 2010, a widescreen version has been shown on basic cable's Fox Movie Channel. 20th Century Home Entertainment has not released the film on VHS, DVD or Blu-ray.

== Reception ==
On the day of the film's Los Angeles opening on September 12, 1980, a review from Charles Champlin of the Los Angeles Times described the film as "essentially a revue sketch, giving the boys and girls of the chorus a chance to dress up funny and mill about. All a revue sketch needs is a thin premise, a point of view and an exit line. But having only one out of three won't make it for a movie." He concluded, "If indeed Altman weren't so original and so talented, an indulgent mess like HealtH would merely be another unsuccessful film in a bad year. It is instead mournful and exasperating in about equal measure."

At the time of the Film Forum premiere, The New York Times' Vincent Canby wrote: "HealtH is, I suppose, a mess, but it is a glorious one in the recognizable manner of a major film maker who sometimes gets carried away—by his subject, by his own enthusiasms and those of his actors, and by the collaborative creative process he loves. As do so many of his films, HealtH gives one the feeling of being on a nonstop party with the people who made it." He added that it "is no masterpiece, but it is one of the most appealing entertainments that Mr. Altman has ever put together". In a later article, he declared: "HealtH deserves to be seen by anyone interested in the career of this most eccentric and unpredictable of contemporary American film directors."

Gene Siskel of the Chicago Tribune called it "a pretty bad movie" and "anemic. Altman sets himself up as superior to his insipid characters, laughs at them, and invites us to do likewise. That's not much of an achievement." Leonard Maltin gave HealtH two stars out of four in his Movie Guide, and added: "Non-Altman fans may love this more than devotees; Woodard steals the film—no easy feat considering that incredible cast—as [the] hotel's ultra-patient manager." Halliwell's Film Guide referred to it as a "zany satirical all-star romp on the lines of A Wedding but by no means as likeable or laughable, considering its cast, as it should be". The Film Bulletin called it a "misfired satire", and commented that its "major stars [...] are otherwise wasted".

In a 1985 book on Altman, Gerard Plecki called HealtH "a humorous companion piece to Nashville", adding that it "was certainly a major improvement over his two previous films". In regards to the studio shelving the film, Plecki remarked that it "certainly deserved mass marketing and a large promotion campaign".

On June 12, 1982, U.S. President Ronald Reagan screened the film at Camp David during stormy weather. In his diaries that day, he called it "the world's worst movie". On the other hand, director Martin Scorsese named it one of the "85 Films You Need to See to Know Anything about Film".

== Themes ==
Since its release, HealtH has been viewed as a parody, and satire, of the U.S. political scene at the time of its filming; critic Daniel O'Brien also noticed "the parallels between the [HealtH] election and the U.S. Presidency explicitly spelt out (several times)" in the film. In his book A Cinema of Loneliness, Robert Phillip Kolker stressed this aspect, writing that "Altman creates a world that is a parody of a political phenomenon that is itself already a parody of show business, for political conventions always mediate the realities of power with the signifiers of spectacle. [HealtH] is, finally, a representation of a representation."

Kolker also observed Altman's use of the carnivalesque, a style from Russian critic Mikhail Bakhtin that the filmmaker employed in many of his productions. O'Brien called this the film's "strongest asset [...], complete with hucksters and suckers (a handy metaphor for most aspects of American society".

In Kolker's words, HealtH is "a hilarious documentation of politics and culture at the end of the Carter era when passivity began to disguise itself as self-satisfaction and marginal interests requested majority attention". The convention in the film "becomes a small mirror of larger political follies, of silly, self-serving people so convinced of their importance that they take for granted the fact that major significance attends their ridiculous activities".

O'Brien noted that in HealtH, "most of the main characters exhibit the expected Altman eccentricites", including the candidates in the election. "All this comes across as a little forced," he continued, "recalling the random weirdness of Brewster McCloud rather than the carefully etched idiosyncrasies of The Long Goodbye or Three Women." Moreover, someone says "Hit it!" just before the convention band replaces the opening Fox fanfare.

== See also ==
- List of American films of 1980
