= College of Fellows of the American Theatre =

American non-profit honorary society

The College of Fellows of the American Theatre is an honorary society of outstanding theatre educators and professional theatre practitioners.

== Origin ==
The organization was formed in 1965 as a project proposed by members of the American Theatre Association. The college is now an independent not-for-profit organization.

== Activities ==
Membership in the college is conferred on individuals of acknowledged national stature who have distinguished themselves during careers of notable dedication, exceptional service and outstanding achievement. Fewer than ten new fellows are created each year, but almost 200 persons have been so honored to date. The majority are still living and most are still active in the theatre to some degree.

The college meets each year at the John F. Kennedy Center for the Performing Arts in Washington, D.C. in conjunction with the Kennedy Center/American College Theatre Festival. Festival participants are invited to the college of Fellows Annual Lecture, which honors Roger L. Stevens, founder and first Chairman of the Center. Each year one of the fellows is selected to give a lecture on the topic of his or her choice. On the eve of the meeting day, fellows and their guests honor the new class of fellows-elect at the college's annual dinner.

The college bestows its public recognition and honors in order to encourage and promote excellence in research and creativity in both the educational and the professional theatre. Among the fellows are actors, theatre critics, costume designers, directors, scene designers, playwrights, lighting designers, producers and administrators, research scholars, and teachers, any of whom may be associated with the commercial as well as the educational theatre in America.

Each year at the annual meeting, and in individual sessions elsewhere during the year, distinguished members of the organization are interviewed on video tape in order to preserve the history of American theatre with which they have been involved. A history of the fellows was published in 1995: American Theatre Fellows: the First Thirty Years, edited by Jed H. Davis and an advisory board consisting of the dean and deans emeriti of the college. The interview video tapes and other archival materials of the fellows are preserved at the University of Texas Libraries, Austin, Texas.

Among those on whom membership has been conferred are Edward Albee, Joseph Anthony, Avery Brooks, Jack Clay, Richard L. Coe, Moses Gunn, Richard G. Fallon, Zelda Fichandler, Gerald Freedman, Rev. Gilbert V. Hartke, O.P., Julia Heflin, Fay Kanin, Jerome Lawrence, Ming Cho Lee, Romulus Linney, Margaret E. Lynn, Davey Marlin-Jones, Marshall W. Mason, Mark Medoff, Arnold Moss, Donn B. Murphy, Frederick O'Neal, Craig Noel, Jose Quintero, Lloyd Richards, George Schaefer, Barrie Stavis, Ezra Stone, Jennifer Tipton and Winifred Mary Ward.
