= Holiday and Company =

American radio comedy series (1946)

Holiday and Company is an American radio comedy series that was broadcast on CBS beginning on February 1, 1946.

== Overview ==
When Shirley Holiday inherited a gas station, she and her husband, Tim, left their nearly quarter-century vaudeville career in which they never quite attainend star status. They moved west with their daughter, Nora, and adopted a new lifestyle. Episodes centered around their adjustment to new work and small-town life.

Real-life spouses and vaudevillians Ray Mayer and Edith Evans portrayed the Holidays, and Frances Heflin played Nora. Roland Winters and Jack Arthur were heard in supporting roles. Ray Bloch and his orchestra provided music. Fred Allen was a guest on the February 15, 1946, episode. Abe Burrows, who wrote the scripts and supervised direction and production, said, "The show needed a shot in the arm along about the third week, and Fred ... came on for me and gave a sock performance."

== Production ==
Holiday and Company replaced It Pays to Be Ignorant on Fridays at 9 p.m. Eastern Time. It had an invited audience for its full dress rehearsals unlike most programs, which had only people involved with the program present for rehearsals. Because of Mayer's and Evans's vaudeville experience, they felt that they performed better when they sensed an audience's reactions to the performance.
