= Julia Heflin =

American journalist, theatre producer and teacher

Julia Dorn Heflin
- Born: Julia Heiman; July 22, 1911; New York (state), USA
- Died: August 20, 2007 (aged 96); Washington, D.C., USA
- Education: Smith College
- Occupation: Theatre producer | Journalist | Teacher
- Spouse: Martin Heflin
- Children: Marta Heflin

Julia Dorn Heflin (July 22, 1911 – August 20, 2007) was an American journalist, theatre producer and teacher. Throughout her long and varied career, Heflin taught drama with Lee Strasberg, worked on Broadway, staged a production of Clifford Odets's Waiting for Lefty on the streets of Moscow, and led the drama department at Mount Vernon College in Washington, D.C. for 22 years.

Heflin directed more than 80 theatre productions at Mount Vernon, then a private women's college before merging with George Washington University. She was one of the first Americans to work in the theatre in Russia before World War II and was a member of the College of Fellows of the American Theatre, the Arts Club of Washington, and the Woman's National Democratic Club.

On August 20, 2007, Heflin died of respiratory failure at the Washington Home hospice, aged 96. She is remembered as a "fiery, feisty woman who held her charges to high standards."

== Education ==
Heflin graduated from Smith College, where she was a member of Phi Beta Kappa. At university, Heflin was named president of the Why Club. A director's award has since been named after her at Smith College.

== Early career ==
Fresh out of college, Julia joined the Hedgerow Repertory Theatre, where she acted and was assigned to the production office. She then worked briefly on Broadway in the 1930s before heading to the Soviet Union.

Arriving in Moscow, Heflin worked as a Reggisseur Practicant at the Meyerhold and Vahktangov theatres, and helped workers on a collective farm produce And Quiet Flows the Don, an opera. She also worked with an English-speaking cast to stage a production of the Clifford Odets drama Waiting For Lefty on a truck-bed in the streets of Moscow, where perhaps the only words understood by the Russians who gathered to watch were, "Strike! Strike!" which brought clamorous cheers from the audience.

While working in Europe, Julia became an interviewer and freelance European/Soviet feature correspondent for Stage Magazine and the old New York Herald Tribune, first abroad, and later when she returned to the United States. She interviewed Nemirovitch-Danchenko, who, with Konstantin Stanislavsky, founded the Moscow Art Theatre. Among many others, she also interviewed actor-singer-activist Paul Robeson, film director Sergei Eisenstein and playwright George Bernard Shaw.

Just before the start of World War II, Heflin returned to New York and began teaching acting classes in the evenings at the Laboratory Theatre in Manhattan with Lee Strasberg. She also staged a play with boys at a public works settlement house and worked for Broadway producers Eddie Dowling, Oscar Serling and Lewis Gensler, and assisted Theresa Helburn at The Theatre Guild. Together with St. John Terrell, Heflin co-founded the Bucks County Playhouse, serving as director and company manager.

Heflin then began a career in radio with CBS as a staff researcher, writer and interviewer for the popular We, the People series. Her interviews with such theatrical luminaries and popular cultural icons as Charlie Chaplin, Salvador Dalí, Bette Davis, Helen Hayes, John Huston, Gene Kelly, Sinclair Lewis and Walt Disney provided her with primary source materials that shaped her subsequent work on the stage and in the classroom.

== Teaching career ==
From 1956 to 1977, Heflin served as the Director of Speech and Drama at Mount Vernon College until being named professor emerita. While serving as Faculty Advisor to the Prep Players and Curtain Callers student theatre groups, Heflin also produced several theatre performances at Mount Vernon.

In a formal ceremony marking her retirement from Mount Vernon College in Washington, DC, Heflin chided the administration for insufficient support of the theatre curriculum, decrying

"a shoddy economy wave which has capsized the theatre arts curricula in many universities and colleges, including Mount Vernon. Relegating theatre and other communications training to chance encounters with well-intentioned, sometimes underpaid or untrained guides, or chopping them from the curricula, violates academic principles in all areas. Theatre arts among the liberal arts are the roots of the civilized balance in an overpowered globe."

== Personal life ==
Julia was married to journalist and public relations advisor Martin Heflin, whose brother Van Heflin and sister Frances Heflin, were both film and Broadway actors. Julia's daughter, Marta Heflin, appeared on Broadway and in Hollywood films, and worked as a cabaret singer in New York until her death in 2013.
