= Sol Kaplan =

American composer (1919–1990)

- Born: April 19, 1919; Philadelphia
- Died: November 14, 1990 (aged 71)
- Spouse: Frances Heflin
- Children: 3

Sol Kaplan (April 19, 1919 – November 14, 1990) was an American film and television music composer.

== Life and career ==
Kaplan was born in Philadelphia, Pennsylvania, and he graduated from the Curtis School of Music there. He worked as a successful concert pianist, including performing at Carnegie Hall in 1940 and 1941. In 1941 he composed his first film score.

During World War II, Kaplan composed music for the film units of the U.S. Army Signal Corps and the Office of Strategic Services, the predecessor to the CIA.

He went on to write music for dozens of films including the 1953 films Titanic and Niagara. His film career was disrupted during the 1950s when he landed on the Hollywood Blacklist after being uncooperative in testimony before the House Committee on Un-American Activities.

For Star Trek, Kaplan scored two episodes, "The Enemy Within" and "The Doomsday Machine". Jeff Bond noted: "Although he wrote only two scores for the series, New York composer Sol Kaplan's music was tracked frequently throughout the show's first two seasons".

=== Appearance before HUAC ===
Sol Kaplan had scored more than 30 Hollywood films between 1940 and 1953. He was subpoenaed by House Committee on Un-American Activities (HUAC) after John Garfield mentioned during his testimony that Kaplan was a friend of his. Kaplan had never been publicly identified as a communist; Garfield denied being a communist; yet Kaplan was fired from 20th Century Fox, where he had been under contract for a year. Kaplan protested that many top studio executives were friends of Garfield, including the man firing him, and he was reinstated on a week-to-week "probation" basis. His testimony took place on April 8, 1953. During it, he challenged the committee to produce his accusers, and invoked the Bill of Rights in refusing to cooperate. On Kaplan's return to work after his testimony, he was told he might be able to keep his job if he would appear privately before Congressman Clyde Doyle. Kaplan refused, and was fired the same day.

== Personal life ==
Kaplan was married to the actress Frances Heflin (sister of actor Van Heflin). Their son was the film director Jonathan Kaplan; they also had two daughters, Nora Heflin and Mady Kaplan Ahern. Sol Kaplan died of lung cancer in 1990 at the age of 71.

== Selected filmography ==
- The Tell-Tale Heart (1941)
- Tales of Manhattan (1942)
- Hollow Triumph (1948)
- Trapped (1949)
- Reign of Terror (1949)
- Port of New York (1949)
- 711 Ocean Drive (1950)
- Mister 880 (1950)
- I'd Climb the Highest Mountain (1951)
- Rawhide (1951)
- I Can Get It for Your Wholesale (1951)
- The House on Telegraph Hill (1951)
- The Secret of Convict Lake (1951)
- Red Skies of Montana (1952)
- Return of the Texan (1952)
- Kangaroo (1952)
- Diplomatic Courier (1952)
- Way of a Gaucho (1952)
- Something for the Birds (1952)
- Niagara (1953)
- Treasure of the Golden Condor (1953)
- Destination Gobi (1953)
- Titanic (1953)
- Salt of the Earth (1954)
- The Burglar (1957)
- Happy Anniversary (1959)
- Girl of the Night (1960)
- The Victors (1963)
- The Young Lovers (1964)
- The Spy Who Came in from the Cold (1965)
- Judith (1966)
- Winchester '73 (1967)
- Shadow on the Land (1968)
- Living Free (1972)
- Lies My Father Told Me (1975)
- Over the Edge (1979)
- The Golden Gate Murders (1979)
