= National Black Arts Festival =

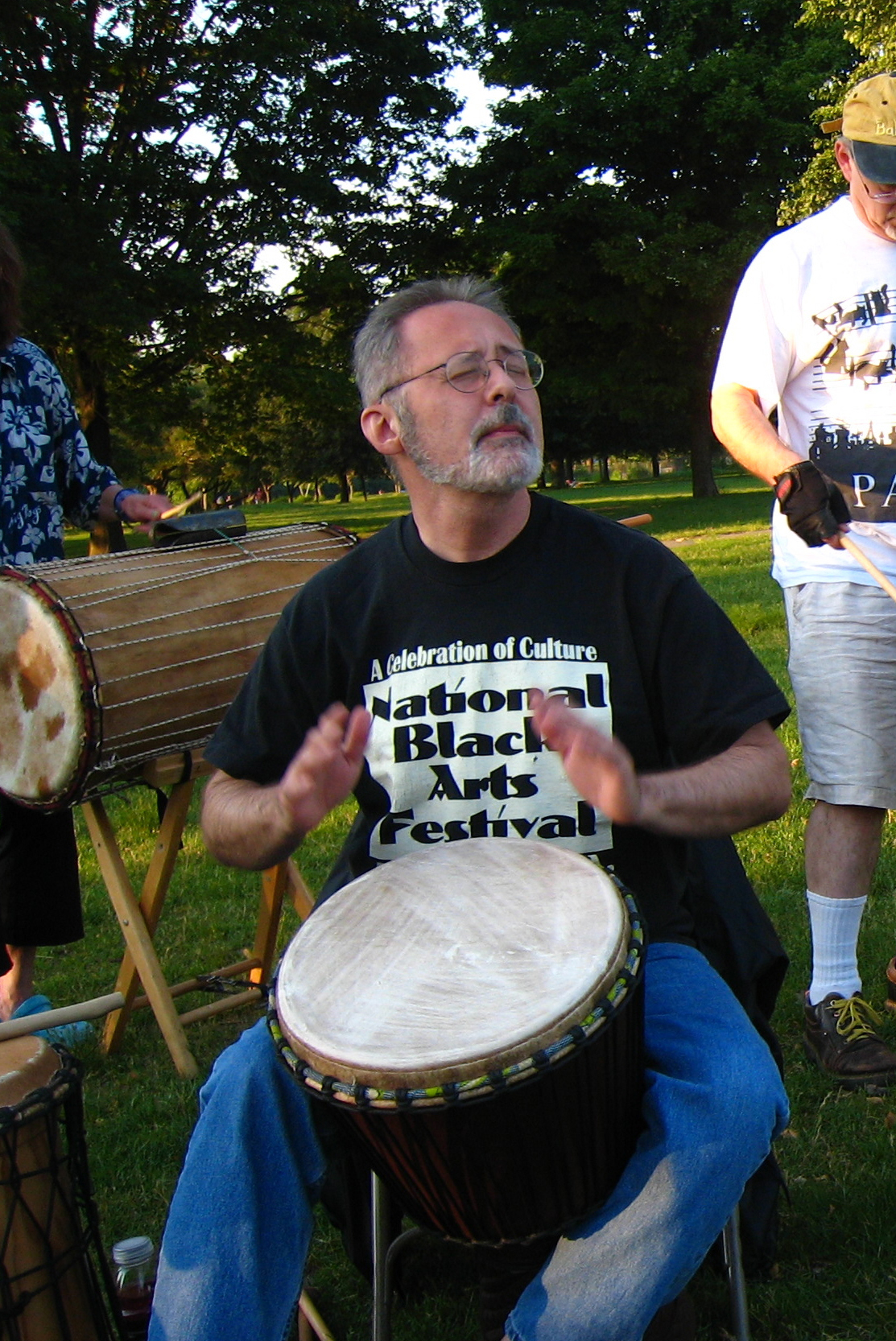
Alan Tauber at the Charles River 2007

The National Black Arts Festival (NBAF) is an organization based in Atlanta, Georgia, founded in 1987. It was originally a one-week long summer festival which was held biennially starting in 1998.

It was started after the Fulton County Arts Council (in Atlanta, Georgia) commissioned a study to explore the feasibility of creating a festival dedicated to celebrating the work of artists of African descent. With Fulton County government as the major sponsor, along with corporate and foundation sponsors, the Festival's first biannual summer festival was held in 1988.

Many artists have taken part in the festival, which includes an Artists’ Market, film screenings, and live performances of jazz, gospel and other music. Among the participants in the festival have been Maya Angelou, Charles Dutton, Wynton Marsalis, Amiri Baraka, Avery Brooks, Nancy Wilson, Sweet Honey in the Rock, Spike Lee, Ousmane Sembène, Pearl Cleage, Kenny Leon, Carrie Mae Weems, Radcliffe Bailey, Sonia Sanchez and many other artists from the US and around the world. As the festival established itself as a showcase for the art and culture of the African Diaspora, it expanded to include year-round educational activities.

The festival's artistic leadership has included Avery Brooks, Dwight Andrews and Stephanie Hughley and has reached over five million people since the first year.
