= Jack Clay =

- Born: Jack DeWayne Clay; October 20, 1926; Decatur, Illinois
- Died: September 2, 2019 (aged 92); Seattle, Washington
- Education: Northwestern University
- Employer(s): Oberlin College, University of Miami, University of South Florida, Southern Methodist University, and University of Washington
- Known for: an acting teacher, director and actor

Jack DeWayne Clay (October 20, 1926 – September 2, 2019) was an American acting teacher, director and actor.

A graduate of the Northwestern University school of speech under Alvina Krause, Clay taught at Oberlin College (1956 - 1957), University of Miami (1957 - 1961), and the University of South Florida (1961 - 1966). He also headed the Professional Actors Training Programs at Southern Methodist University (1966 - 1986) and the University of Washington (1986 - 1991). While in Dallas, he founded "Stage #1," a professional acting company, and served as its artistic director for eight years.

Clay's teachers included Lee Strasberg, Martha Graham and Eric Hawkins. Among his best-known students were Kathy Bates, Powers Boothe, Patricia Richardson, Stephen Tobolowsky, Beth Henley and Christopher Evan Welch.

Clay was also a distinguished member of the College of Fellows of the American Theatre.

Clay died on September 2, 2019, in Seattle.
