= Come Back to the 5 & Dime, Jimmy Dean, Jimmy Dean (play) =

1976 play by Ed Graczyk

- Original language: English
- Written by: Ed Graczyk
- Characters: Juanita; Sissy; Mona; Joe; Sue Ellen; Stella May; Edna Louise; Martha; Alice Ann; Clarissa; Joanne
- Genre: Comedy-drama
- Setting: A five-and-dime store in Texas, 1955 and 1975

Premiere
- Date: September 1976
- Place: Players Theatre Columbus, Columbus, Ohio

Come Back to the 5 & Dime, Jimmy Dean, Jimmy Dean is a 1976 play by Ed Graczyk, originally performed at the Players Theatre Columbus in Columbus, Ohio. Despite the rendition of the name in the play’s title, it refers to the star of the film Rebel Without a Cause, James Dean, as opposed to Jimmy Dean, the country-western singer who had a hit in 1961 with "Big Bad John". The play revolves around a James Dean fan club that reunites at a Texas five and dime store.

In 1982, filmmaker Robert Altman directed both a Broadway version at the Martin Beck Theater and a film adaptation of the same name. Altman's version of the play was not well-received with critics at the time.

== Synopsis ==
An all-female fan club called the Disciples of James Dean meets at a five and dime store in the small town of McCarthy, Texas. According to a 2014 interview with playwright Ed Graczyk, the setting of the play is actually an "H.L. Kressmont Five and Dime", inspired by the real-life S.H. Kress & Co.. The group reunites in 1975 to commemorate the twentieth anniversary of Dean's death. (In 1955, the actor was filming Giant in Marfa, not far from where the store stands.)

== Cast ==
Name	Character	Source
Sudie Bond	Juanita	
Cher	Sissy	
Sandy Dennis	Mona	
Mark Patton	Joe	
Gena Ramsel	Sue Ellen	
Kathy Bates	Stella May	
Marta Heflin	Edna Louise	
Ann Risley	Martha	
Dianne Turley Travis	Alice Ann	
Ruth Miller	Clarissa	
Karen Black	Joanne	

== Development ==
Ed Graczyk originally wrote and directed Come Back to the 5 & Dime, Jimmy Dean, Jimmy Dean for the Players' Theater in Columbus, Ohio, which also produced it. At the time of the Ohio production, he said of its development:

The inspiration for Come Back to the 5 & Dime, Jimmy Dean, Jimmy Dean came many years ago during my five year association with the Midland Community Theatre in west Texas. While I was there I had the opportunity to visit Marfa, the site used by Warner Bros. in filming Giant. The only remaining evidence of the film was the facade of the mansion Reata (Note: Reata was the family ranch where both the book and film versions of Giant took place.) used to film the on-location scenes, now crumbling and supported by six telephone poles. It was the memory of that site, the pace of the people and the vivid recollection of the '50s idol James Dean on the youth of the period that resulted in the writing of this play.

It was also produced by the Alliance Theatre Company in Atlanta GA in 1977, starring Fannie Flagg and Dana Ivey.

== Broadway version ==
Jimmy Dean had a short run in New York City in 1980. Early that same decade, while turning his attention from Hollywood to the stage, filmmaker Robert Altman acquired the rights to Graczyk's work. While securing options on another two works—The Hold-Up by Marsha Norman and The Diviners by Jim Leonard—he negotiated to direct Jimmy Dean on Broadway, with the intention to film it as a theatrical release. (Note: Altman stated that "the initial press report that it was made for cable is not true".) He also spent US$850,000 of his own money bringing it to Broadway.

During the casting process, Altman considered a role for Shelley Duvall, a star of his previous film Popeye. But, in his words, "the balance wasn't correct" this time around. Altman found out that pop singer Cher was in New York at the time, but he did not feel sure she would land a part. "If you're really serious," he advised her, "read for it." Thanks to his encouragement, she landed the part of the waitress Sissy—her first major role on stage. Another of the performers, Karen Black, previously appeared in Altman's 1975 film Nashville.

The first Broadway preview of Come Back to the 5 & Dime, Jimmy Dean, Jimmy Dean took place on February 8, 1982 (which would have been the actor's 51st birthday, had he lived). Between February 18 and April 4, 1982, it ran for 52 performances at the Martin Beck Theater. Altman had requested that Graczyk delay collecting his royalties so that the production could run longer. Graczyk declined, later recalling that the actresses were not asked to make similar financial sacrifices.

Some time later, Altman directed a film adaptation of the same name, which won the Best Film Award at the Chicago International Film Festival.

== Reception ==
The Broadway version of Jimmy Dean was not well-received with critics. The New York Times' Frank Rich commented that "Neither the gimmicky plot nor its cliched participants are credible." John Simon of New York wrote, "Although the play becomes a little less boring in the second act, it is too little too late, and at the cost of some whopping improbabilities. Hit-and-miss directorial bravura and an expensive production are not enough to justify so much ado."

== Bibliography ==
- Graczyk, Ed (1982). Come Back to the 5 & Dime, Jimmy Dean, Jimmy Dean: A Comedy-Drama. Samuel French, Inc. ISBN 0-573-60764-8.
