= Ed Graczyk =

American dramatist (1941–2026)

Edward Graczyk
- Born: April 22, 1941; Pennsylvania, U.S.
- Died: February 11, 2026 (aged 84)
- Other name: Ed Graczyk
- Occupation: Playwright
- Years active: 1969–2026
- Known for: Come Back to the Five and Dime, Jimmy Dean, Jimmy Dean

Edward Graczyk (April 22, 1941 – February 11, 2026) was an American playwright originally from Ohio. He wrote several children's plays early in his career, but became better known as the author of 1976's Come Back to the Five and Dime, Jimmy Dean, Jimmy Dean. In 1982, Graczyk won the Best Screenplay Award at the Belgium International Film Festival for Robert Altman's motion picture adaptation.

== Life and career ==
Graczyk was born in Pennsylvania on April 22, 1941. Between 1968 and 1973, he lived in Midland, Texas and wrote children's plays such as Aesop's Falables and Livin' de Life. He began to develop his stage drama Come Back to the Five and Dime, Jimmy Dean, Jimmy Dean, after driving to the small town of Marfa and researching the customs of the area. The legend of actor James Dean, and the closure of five-and-dime stores in this place, lent their influences to the play's development. Graczyk went on to say:

Jimmy Dean can only be described as the result of my own observations and frustrations with progress that ignores a past; the lack of personalization and pride and the recurring need of people to build facades to conceal the truths of their lives. It is the facade that makes abnormal people seem normal and the sad people seem happy. A personal observation which I feel makes the people I write about, colorful, theatrical, but most of all, honest.

After his brief stay in Texas, he moved back to Ohio and served as the artistic director of the Players Theatre in Columbus, Ohio; his tenure there lasted from 1973 to 1993. The first version of Jimmy Dean premiered in September 1976 at Players Theatre; in early 1980, it moved to New York City for a brief run with filmmaker Robert Altman directing.^{:89} He created a filmed theatre version to largely positive reviews.^{:93} Nonetheless, Altman soon managed to make a low-budget film adaptation financed by Viacom Enterprises and Mark Goodson Productions. The film won numerous awards at film festivals, including Best Film at Chicago; Ed Graczyk won for Best Screenplay at the Belgium International event.

The playwright followed up Jimmy Dean with A Murder of Crows, which opened at New York's South Side Theater in September 1988. In the early 1990s, he wrote a one-man show with Keith Carradine entitled My Time Ain't Long. By 2003, he was living in Ohio's Miami Valley area and was still writing plays, although in his words, "There are currently several scripts running around in my computer looking for an exit." His most recent work, The Blue Moon Dancing, premiered in Dallas on August 20, 2010.

Throughout his career, Graczyk also served as a theater designer and administrator. He worked with various institutions such as the Hartford Stage Company and the Erie Playhouse.

Graczyk died after a long illness on April 11, 2026, at the age of 84.

== Selected works ==
| Year | Title | Source |
|---|---|---|
| 1969 | Aesop's Falables | |
| 1970 | Livin' de Life: A Play for Young People | |
| 1971 | Appleseed: A Play of Peace | |
| 1971 | Due to a Lack of Interest, Tomorrow Has Been Canceled (Note: Also known as Due to a Lack of Interest, Tomorrow Has Been Postponed.) | |
| 1971 | Electric Folderol | |
| 1973 | Courage! A Play of War | |
| 1974 | Weeds | |
| 1976 | Come Back to the Five and Dime, Jimmy Dean, Jimmy Dean (original play) | |
| 1982 | Come Back to the Five and Dime, Jimmy Dean, Jimmy Dean (film version) | |
| 1988 | A Murder of Crows | |
| 1992 | Love Janis | |
| 1995 | Hometown Heroes | |
| 1995 | My Time Ain't Long | |
| 2010 | Blue Moon Dancing | |

== See also ==
- List of playwrights from the United States
