= Africa's Elephant Kingdom =

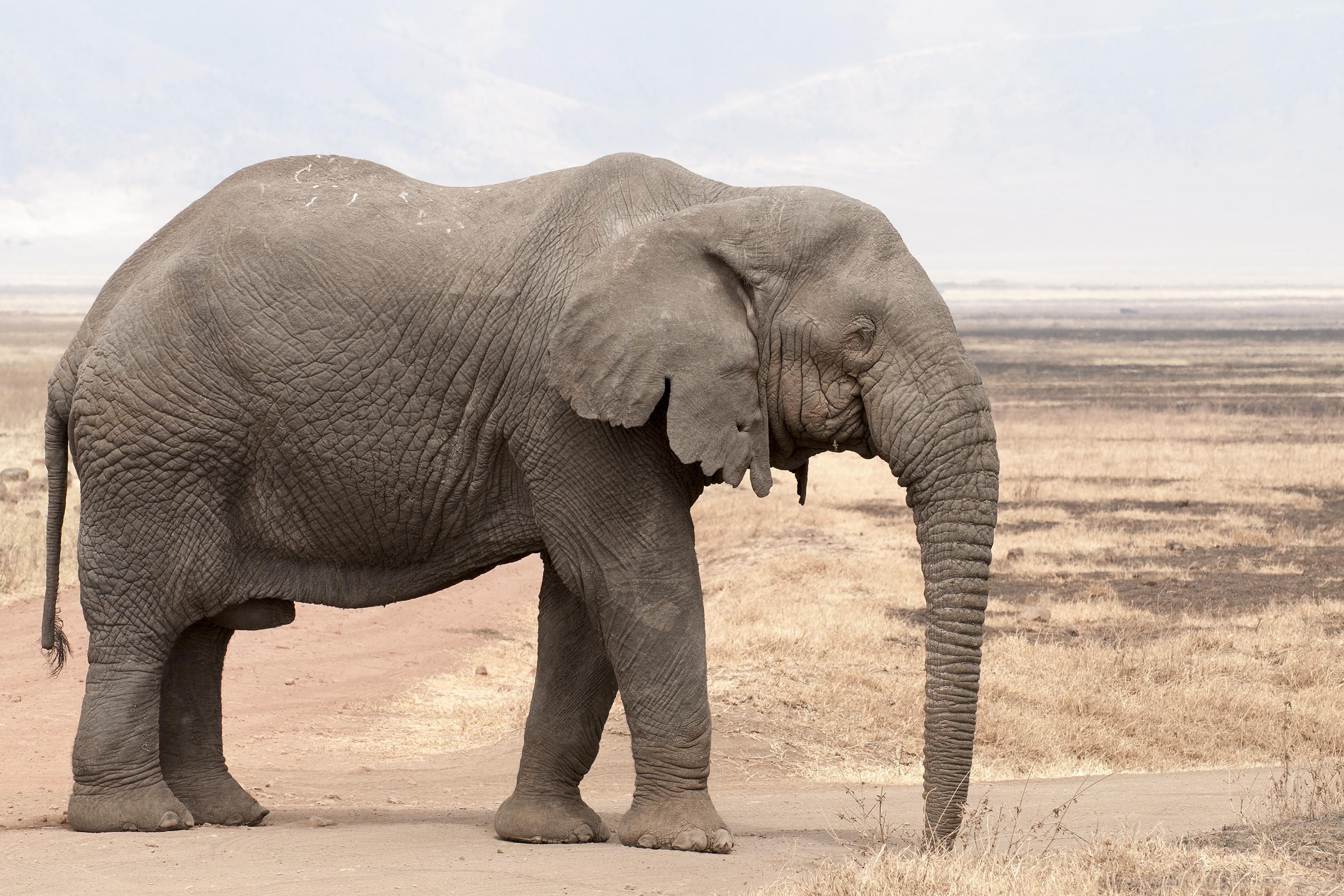
- Loxodonta africana
- Directed by: Michael Caulfield
- Written by: Michael Caulfield
- Produced by: Michael Caulfield
- Narrated by: Avery Brooks
- Production company: Discovery Channel Pictures
- Release date: May 1998
- Running time: 40 minutes
- Country: United States
- Language: English

Africa's Elephant Kingdom is a 1998 IMAX film documenting life under the lives of African bush elephants. The film was produced by the Discovery Channel under Discovery Pictures. The film is set in Tanzania and Kenya, and is narrated by an elephant named "Old Bull" (voiced by Avery Brooks). The film was directed, written and produced by Michael Caulfield.
