= Belita Moreno =

American actress

- Born: November 1, 1949 (age 76); Dallas, Texas, U.S.
- Education: Southern Methodist University (BFA)
- Occupation: Actress
- Years active: 1977–present
- Spouse: Joel Rudnick (m. 1982)
- Children: 2

Aurabela "Belita" Moreno (born November 1, 1949) is an American actress best known for her roles as Benita "Benny" Lopez on the ABC sitcom George Lopez and Edwina Twinkacetti and Lydia Markham on Perfect Strangers.

== Early life ==
Moreno was born in Dallas, Texas, the daughter of Aurora Rodriguez, a high school Spanish teacher, and Abel Moreno, a World War II veteran. Moreno has a younger sister, Elsie. Abel Moreno was the creator of the first logo for the Mexican restaurant, El Chico. Belita graduated from Justin F. Kimball High School and received a full scholarship to SMU.

Moreno majored in Theatre at Southern Methodist University. She continued her acting studies at the Pacific Conservatory of the Performing Arts in Santa Maria, California, where she appeared in the musical Once Upon a Mattress.

== Career ==
Soon after Moreno arrived in Hollywood, California, to pursue her acting career, she met director Robert Altman, and landed roles in three of his films: 3 Women, A Wedding, and A Perfect Couple. She appeared in many other films, including Mommie Dearest, Swing Shift, Oh, God! You Devil, Nobody's Fool, Men Don't Leave, Clear and Present Danger and Grosse Pointe Blank.

Moreno was a regular on the long-running ABC sitcom Perfect Strangers from 1986 to 1992. Her work on television includes appearances in television movies, such as Crazy From the Heart and Death Benefit, the miniseries Tales of the City, and in numerous sitcoms and dramatic series, including The Golden Girls, Family Ties, Valerie and Melrose Place. Moreno played Benny Lopez, George Lopez's mother, on George Lopez (2002–07).

During the 1980s, Moreno was a favorite of Pulitzer Prize-winning playwright Beth Henley, who Moreno was a classmate of at Southern Methodist University. Moreno performed in at least four premieres of Henley's plays. Henley created several roles specifically for Moreno: "Popeye" in The Miss Firecracker Contest, some dialogue of which was based on a true story told to the playwright by Moreno, and "Lacey Rollins" in the two-act play The Lucky Spot. Moreno performed in Firecracker at the Victory Theater in Burbank, California in 1980, and in Lucky Spot off-Broadway at the Manhattan Theatre Club in 1987.

Moreno also appeared in Henley's 1982 Broadway premiere at the Eugene O'Neill Theater of The Wake of Jamey Foster as "Katty Foster", directed by Ulu Grosbard, and in the 1989 world premiere of Abundance, as "Macon" at the South Coast Repertory in Costa Mesa, California.

Since the early 1990s, Moreno has served as an acting coach and advisor on numerous films, such as Jerry Maguire, Rush Hour 2, Almost Famous, Parent Trap, The Family Man, Crossroads and 17 Again. She also appeared on Wizards of Waverly Place on Disney, Desperate Housewives on ABC, and Fairly Legal on USA Network.

== Filmography ==
=== Film ===
Year	Title	Role	Notes
1977	3 Women	Alcira	
1978	Remember My Name	Neighbor	
1978	A Wedding	Daphne Corelli	
1979	A Perfect Couple	Eleousa	
1981	Mommie Dearest	Belinda Rosenberg	
1982	Jekyll and Hyde... Together Again	Nurse Gonzales	
1984	Swing Shift	Mabel Stoddard	
1984	Oh, God! You Devil	Mrs. Vega	
1986	Nobody's Fool	Jane	
1988	Two Idiots in Hollywood	Dream Barbecue Mother	
1990	Men Don't Leave	Mrs. Buckley	
1994	Clear and Present Danger	Jean Fowler	
1997	Grosse Pointe Blank	Mrs. Kinetta	
2005	Barbara Jean	Marion	Short
2010	Diary of a Wimpy Kid	Mrs. Norton	
2011	Diary of a Wimpy Kid: Rodrick Rules	Mrs. Norton	
2017	Ferdinand	Shopkeeper	Voice

=== Television ===
Year	Title	Role	Notes
1977	Mary Hartman, Mary Hartman	Helen Dinsmore	2 episodes
1979	Visions	Julia	Episode: "Ladies in Waiting"
1981	A Gun in the House	Marcie Clark	TV film
1982	Lou Grant	Cathy Short	Episode: "Fireworks"
1983–1988	Family Ties	Norma / Mrs. Pedroza / Bernice	3 episodes
1983	Cocaine and Blue Eyes	Waitress	TV film
1983	The Powers of Matthew Star	Louise	Episode: "Starr Knight"
1985	Scandal Sheet		TV film
1985	Robert Kennedy and His Times	Angie Novello	TV miniseries
1985	Do You Remember Love	Social Worker	TV film
1985	I Dream of Jeannie... Fifteen Years Later	Ms. Farrell	TV film
1985	Crime of Innocence	Marge Kennedy	Uncredited; TV film
1985	What's Happening Now!	Mrs. Jones	Episode: "The Challenge"
1986	The Golden Girls	Nurse	Uncredited; Episode: "The Operation"
1986	Melba	Babs	Episode: "The Girls Are Back in Town"
1986–1992	Perfect Strangers	Lydia Markham / Mrs. Edwina Twinkacetti	Recurring role, 46 episodes
1987	Full House	Ronnie Gardner	Episode: "Our Very First Promo"
1988	The Hogan Family	Mrs. Thorne	Episode: "Close Encounters"
1988	The Slap Maxwell Story	Annie's Lawyer	Series finale
1990	Going Places	Mme. Pushnik	Episode: "Curse of the Video"
1991	Crazy from the Heart	Beebee Stiles	TV film
1992	Roseanne	Woman at Retirement Home	Episode: "Ladies' Choice"
1993	Murphy Brown	Sidney	Episode: "Games Mother Play"
1993	Major Dad	Ms. Whitlin	Episode: "Night School"
1993	Tales of the City	Alice Tolliver	TV miniseries
1993	Getting By	Marie Enright	Episode: "Turnabout Dance"
1996	Melrose Place	Gloria Bryan	3 episodes
1996	Death Benefit	Sarah West	TV film
1996	The Bachelor's Baby	Judge Linda Farmer	TV film
1996	Common Law	Ruta	Episode: "In the Matter of: Luis in Love"
2002–2007	George Lopez	Benita "Benny" Lopez	Main role, 120 episodes
2008	Wizards of Waverly Place	Magdalena	Episode: "Quinceanera"
2009	The Eastmans	June Lynn	Unsold TV pilot
2011	Fairly Legal	Betty	2 episodes
2011	Truth Be Told	Sophia Bishop	TV film
2014	Red Band Society	Dr. Holtzman	Episode: "Pilot"
2015	Family Guy	Hispanic Woman (voice)	Episode: "Peter's Sister"
2019	On My Block	Rosario	Episode: Chapter 15
2022	Lopez vs. Lopez	Bella	Episode: "Lopez vs. Christmas"
