= Allan F. Nicholls =

Canadian film actor and director

- Born: April 8, 1945 (age 81); Montreal, Quebec, Canada
- Occupations: Actor, film director, film producer, screenwriter and composer
- Years active: 1970–2006

Allan F. Nicholls (born April 8, 1945) is a Canadian actor, film director, film producer, screenwriter, composer and musician. He was nominated for both a BAFTA and WGA award for his writing on the 1978 film A Wedding. He is often credited as Allan Nicholls. Allan was lead vocalist in the mid-60s with recording acts J.B. & The Playboys (RCA), who later became The Jaybees (on RCA) then Carnival Connection (Capitol). After playing Claude in the musical "Hair" he returned to Montreal to briefly sing lead vocals with Mashmakhan before releasing a number of solo recordings (with some charting in Canada) before delving into a career with the movie industry. A "J.B. & The Playboys – Anthology" CD was released by Super Oldies in 2005. He is probably most well known to the general public for his role as team captain Johnny Upton in the movie Slap Shot.

== Personal life ==
Nicholls's grandfather was goaltender Riley Hern, who played for the Montreal Wanderers. The Wanderers won the Stanley Cup with Hern in goal in 1908, 1909 and 1911.

== Selected filmography as an actor ==
Year	Title	Role
1975	Nashville	Bill
1976	Welcome to L.A.	Dana Howard
1976	Buffalo Bill and the Indians, or Sitting Bull's History Lesson	Prentiss Ingraham
1977	Slap Shot	Johnny Upton (#12)
1978	A Wedding	Jake Jacobs
1979	A Perfect Couple	Dana 115
1980	Popeye	Rough House
1980	HealtH	Jake Jacobs
1984	Home Free All	Barry Simon
1985	Trouble in Mind	Sector Representative Pete Regis
1992	Bob Roberts	Cutting Edge Director
1999	Cradle Will Rock	George Zorn

== Filmography as a writer ==
- 1978 A Wedding
- 1979 A Perfect Couple

== Filmography as a director ==
- 1982 Dead Ringer
- 1983 I Am a Hotel

== Filmography as a composer ==
- 1975 Nashville
- 1979 A Perfect Couple
