= Jonathan Kaplan =

American film director (1947–2025)

- Born: November 25, 1947; Paris, France
- Died: August 1, 2025 (aged 77); Los Angeles, California, U.S.
- Occupations: Film producer; director
- Years active: 1972–2014
- Spouse: Julie Selzer (1987–2001)
- Children: 1
- Parents: Sol Kaplan (father); Frances Heflin (mother)
- Relatives: Van Heflin (uncle); Marta Heflin (cousin)

Jonathan Kaplan (November 25, 1947 – August 1, 2025) was an American film producer and director. His film The Accused (1988) earned actress Jodie Foster the Oscar for Best Actress and was nominated for the Golden Bear at the 39th Berlin International Film Festival. His film Love Field (1992) earned actress Michelle Pfeiffer an Oscar nomination for Best Actress and was nominated for the Golden Bear at the 43rd Berlin International Film Festival. Kaplan received five Emmy nominations for his roles directing and producing the television series ER.

== Background ==
Born in Paris, Kaplan was the son of film composer Sol Kaplan and actress Frances Heflin, the nephew of actor Van Heflin, and the brother of actresses Nora Heflin and Mady Kaplan. His cousin was actress Marta Heflin. He lived in Hollywood, Los Angeles until 1954, when his father had to move to New York City after being blacklisted.

== Career ==
Kaplan started his career as a child actor in the Broadway production of The Dark at the Top of the Stairs directed by Elia Kazan. He was in a 1964 off-Broadway production Rumplestiltskin directed by Elaine May.

He earned a AB degree at the University of Chicago before studying film at New York University in Manhattan where he was tutored by Martin Scorsese and made an award-winning short film, Stanley (1965). Kaplan was working at the Fillmore East on the Lower East Side, doing some editing on the side, when Roger Corman offered him the opportunity to direct Night Call Nurses (1972); Kaplan had been recommended by Scorsese. Kaplan made the movie and returned to New York City. It was a hit, and Corman offered him another film, The Student Teachers (1973), which he also co-wrote and co-edited.

After making The Slams (1973) for Corman's brother Gene, he directed Truck Turner (1974), which was another huge success and got Kaplan an offer to direct White Line Fever (1975) for Columbia Pictures, a major Hollywood studio. The movie was an even larger success but then Kaplan made what he describes as "the biggest failure of my career", Mr. Billion (1977), an attempt to launch Terence Hill to American audiences. He then made the critically acclaimed Over the Edge (1979), which failed to reach large audiences.

Kaplan said at this stage the only films he was being offered were ones with plots like "boy meets truck boy gets truck, boy loses truck and boy gets truck again." As a result, he directed a series of TV movies. "I'm a director," he said. "I want to direct movies. I don't want to sit around and have fantasies or let a project go down the tubes when we can't get some star to read the script." During the early 1980s, Kaplan directed some movies for television and many music videos, including several for John Cougar Mellencamp, and Rod Stewart's "Infatuation" in 1984. Kaplan also directed the 1983 drag racing biopic Heart Like a Wheel and the 1987 science fiction-thriller Project X.

His feature film career was revived in 1988, when The Accused (1988) earned Jodie Foster her first Oscar, for Best Actress. High profile feature film directing jobs followed, including Immediate Family (1989) and Unlawful Entry (1992). His direction of Michelle Pfeiffer in Love Field (1992) garnered her a Best Actress Academy Award nomination in 1993. His final theatrical feature film was Brokedown Palace (1999). Beginning in the 1990s, Kaplan primarily worked as a television director.

== Personal life and death ==
Kaplan had a daughter, Molly. He died from liver cancer at his home in Los Angeles, on August 1, 2025, at the age of 77.

== Selected filmography ==
Film

- Night Call Nurses (1972)
- The Student Teachers (1973)
- The Slams (1973)
- Truck Turner (1974)
- White Line Fever (1975)
- Mr. Billion (1977)
- Over the Edge (1979)
- Heart Like a Wheel (1983)
- Project X (1987)
- The Accused (1988)
- Immediate Family (1989)
- Unlawful Entry (1992)
- Love Field (1992)
- Bad Girls (1994)
- Brokedown Palace (1999)

Television films

- 11th Victim (1979)
- The Gentleman Bandit (1981)
- Girls of the White Orchid (1983)
- Rebel Highway: Reform School Girl (1994)

Television series

- Fallen Angels (1993)
- Picture Windows (1995)
- In Cold Blood (1996)
- ER (1997)
- Crossing Jordan (2005)
- Law and Order: Special Victims Unit (2005–2012)
- Without a Trace (2006–2009)
- Brothers and Sisters (2010)

Directed Academy Award performances
Under Kaplan's direction, these actors have received Academy Award nominations (and one win) for their performances in their respective roles.

Year	Performer	Film	Result
Academy Award for Best Actress
1988	Jodie Foster	The Accused	Won
1992	Michelle Pfeiffer	Love Field	Nominated
