= Frances Heflin =

American actress (1920–1994)

- Heflin in an undated publicity photo
- Born: Mary Frances Heflin; September 20, 1920; Oklahoma City, Oklahoma, U.S.
- Died: June 1, 1994 (aged 73); New York City, U.S.
- Occupation: Actress
- Years active: 1941–1994
- Spouses: Sidney Kaufman (m. 1944; div. 1945) Sol Kaplan (m. 1945; died 1990)
- Children: 3; including Jonathan Kaplan
- Relatives: Van Heflin (brother); Julia Heflin (sister-in-law); Marta Heflin (niece)

Mary Frances Heflin (September 20, 1920 – June 1, 1994) was an American actress. She is best known for her role as Mona Kane Tyler on the soap opera All My Children (1970–1994).

== Early life ==
Heflin was born in Oklahoma City, Oklahoma, the daughter of Fanny Bleecker (née Shippey) and Dr. Emmett Evan Heflin, a dentist. She had two older brothers, Martin, a public relations executive, and the actor Van Heflin. Through Martin, she was the aunt of actress Marta Heflin.

== Career ==
Heflin made her Broadway debut in her teens and was later featured in the original productions of The Skin of Our Teeth (1942), The World's Full of Girls (1943), I Remember Mama (1944), and the U.S. premiere of Bertolt Brecht's Galileo on July 30, 1947 in Los Angeles. Other Broadway credits included The Physicists, A Streetcar Named Desire, The Tempest, Sheppey, All in Favor, and The Walrus and the Carpenter. She starred in London's West End, in John Gielgud's UK premiere of The Glass Menagerie as Laura opposite Helen Hayes.

Heflin's film debut came in The Molly Maguires (1970), as she portrayed the wife of a leader of that Irish secret society.

A life member of The Actors Studio, Heflin had varying roles on many television series in the 1950s and 1960s, including small roles on Kraft Television Theatre and The Patty Duke Show. But her most notable and enduring role was of Mona Kane Tyler, mother of Erica Kane, on the soap opera All My Children. She played the role from January 1970 until her death in June 1994.

Heflin began her professional career on radio, where she was heard on Aunt Jenny, Betty and Bob, Cavalcade, Columbia Workshop, Grand Central Station, and other programs. She portrayed Nora Holiday in the CBS radio comedy Holiday and Company.

== Personal life ==
Heflin was briefly married to filmmaker Sidney Kaufman from 1944 to 1945, before marrying composer Sol Kaplan in 1945. Heflin and Kaplan remained together until his death in 1990, and had three children: Jonathan Kaplan, a film director, and Nora Heflin and Mady Kaplan, both actresses.

== Death ==
Heflin died of lung cancer on June 1, 1994 in New York City. She was 73 years old.

== Filmography ==
=== Film ===
Year	Title	Role	Notes
1970	The Molly Maguires	Mrs. Frazier	
1973	The Student Teachers	Mrs. Updegrove	
1977	Mr. Billion	Mrs. Apple Pie	

=== Television ===
Year	Title	Role	Notes
1954	Kraft Television Theatre	—N/a	Episode: "Blind Alley"
1955, 1958	The United States Steel Hour	Grace Ward / Emily	2 episodes
1961	Tallahassee 7000	Jane Rogers	Episode: "The Men from Tallahassee"
1963	Naked City	Josephine Hendon	Episode: "Her Life in Moving Pictures"
1964, 1965	The Patty Duke Show	Cissy Lane / Miss Harvey	2 episodes
1965	The Defenders	Mrs. Kraft	Episode: "Fires of the Mind"
1970–1994	All My Children	Mona Kane Tyler	465 episodes

=== Radio appearances ===
Year	Program	Notes
1947	Cavalcade of America	Episode: "The School for Men"
