= The Captains (film) =

- Official poster
- Directed by: William Shatner
- Written by: William Shatner
- Produced by: J. Craig Thompson
- Starring: William Shatner; Patrick Stewart; Avery Brooks; Kate Mulgrew; Scott Bakula; Chris Pine
- Cinematography: Decebal Dascau
- Edited by: Decebal Dascau
- Music by: Andy Milne
- Production company: Le Big Boss Productions
- Distributed by: Movie Central; The Movie Network; Epix (US); Corus Entertainment; Ballinran Entertainment
- Release dates: July 22, 2011 (United States); October 1, 2011 (Canada)
- Running time: 96 minutes
- Country: Canada
- Language: English

The Captains is a 2011 feature documentary that follows Canadian actor William Shatner through interviews with the other actors who have portrayed starship captains in five other incarnations of the Star Trek franchise. Shatner's subjects discuss their lives and careers before, during, and after their tenure with Star Trek. They explore the pressures, stigmas, and sacrifices that accompanied their roles and their larger careers. The film makes use of conversations, personal observations, interviews, and archival footage.

== Cast ==
Main

- William Shatner, who portrayed James T. Kirk in Star Trek: The Original Series, and conducts the interviews that make up The Captains
- Scott Bakula, who portrayed Jonathan Archer in Star Trek: Enterprise
- Avery Brooks, who portrayed Benjamin Sisko in Star Trek: Deep Space Nine
- Kate Mulgrew, who portrayed Kathryn Janeway in Star Trek: Voyager
- Chris Pine, who portrays an alternate timeline version of James T. Kirk in the rebooted Star Trek films
- Patrick Stewart, who portrayed Jean-Luc Picard in Star Trek: The Next Generation

Short segments

- René Auberjonois, who portrayed Odo in Star Trek: Deep Space Nine
- Jonathan Frakes, who portrayed William Riker in Star Trek: The Next Generation
- Christopher Plummer, who portrayed General Chang in Star Trek VI: The Undiscovered Country
- Connor Trinneer, who portrayed Trip Tucker in Star Trek: Enterprise
- Nana Visitor, who portrayed Kira Nerys in Star Trek: Deep Space Nine

Brief appearances

- Richard Arnold, the former assistant to Gene Roddenberry
- Walter Koenig, who portrayed Pavel Chekov in Star Trek: The Original Series
- John de Lancie, who portrayed Q in Star Trek: The Next Generation, Star Trek: Deep Space Nine, and Star Trek: Voyager
- Chase Masterson, who portrayed Leeta in Star Trek: Deep Space Nine
- Robert Picardo, who portrayed The Doctor in Star Trek: Voyager and Star Trek: Deep Space Nine
- Jeri Ryan, who portrayed Seven of Nine in Star Trek: Voyager
- Garrett Wang, who portrayed Harry Kim in Star Trek: Voyager
- Grace Lee Whitney, who portrayed Yeoman Rand in Star Trek: The Original Series
- Craig Huxley, who appeared in two episodes of the original series and provided special music for the first four Star Trek movies. Shatner encountered him by chance and did not recognize him. Huxley is uncredited.

== Synopsis ==
The film consists of a series of interviews conducted by William Shatner, who portrayed Captain James T. Kirk in the original Star Trek with the various other actors who have portrayed Star Trek Captains: Sir Patrick Stewart, Avery Brooks, Kate Mulgrew, Scott Bakula, and Chris Pine. The Captains delves into each actor's life and career leading up to their film or television performances. The film devotes attention to Shatner's own acting roots, tracking his journey from his beginnings at the Stratford Shakespeare Festival and CBC Radio and CBC Television, to headlining Broadway shows, and eventually getting his break in Hollywood as the star of Gene Roddenberry's Star Trek series.

"My hope is to delve deeply into these actors' psyches, find out more about them so you can ... see what common denominator there is among us as actors that brought [us] to this worldwide renown as part of Star Trek."

— William Shatner on his hopes for The Captains.

Shatner's travels take him from Los Angeles to Oxfordshire, England; to Toronto and Stratford, Ontario; Las Vegas, New York City, and Princeton, New Jersey. While in Stratford, Shatner sits down with his friend Christopher Plummer, who was instrumental in Shatner's young career, and who would eventually play the role of bloodthirsty Klingon General Chang in Star Trek VI: The Undiscovered Country.

The documentary also chronicles Shatner's own six-decade career and reveals the embarrassment he felt over his role within the Star Trek franchise. During the process of the film, with help from the other Captains, Shatner overcomes his disdain and learns to embrace his best known character, Captain James T. Kirk.

== Production ==
The Captains is produced by Le Big Boss Productions in association with Movie Central, a Corus Entertainment Company, The Movie Network, an Astral Media Network; Les Chaines Tele Astral – a division of Astral Broadcasting Group Inc. and Epix-HD, and in association with Ballinran Entertainment, 455 Films and Love Lake Productions with the participation of the Canada Media Fund, the Canadian Film or Video Production Tax Credit, and the Ontario Media Development Corporation Film and Television Tax Credit.

== Reception ==
On July 21, 2011, Mike Hale of the New York Times wrote, "The Captains turns out to be largely about William Shatner. That's not a criticism. Mr. Shatner's genial, relaxed self-absorption is a large part of his charm, along with his odd cadences and his unparalleled knack for blurring the line between pomposity and sincerity. He has a kind of reverse Midas effect: everything he touches should turn creepy, but somehow it doesn't." Hale goes on to say in his review that the film is, "pretty tolerable as vanity projects go. And it should be catnip for Trekkers and Trekkies".

TrekMovie.com's reviewer Anthony Pascale had mixed feelings claiming, "The Captains is overly long, a bit self-indulgent, and possibly overly ambitious. The direction and editing are trying a bit too hard with Shatner not really letting the core content of his interviews stand out." Pascale concludes with saying that The Captains "is still a must-watch for any Trekkie. You will learn, you will laugh, and you may even cry watching The Captains. Sure there is an element of being an ego-trip for the director, but what else would you expect from The Shatner. It is still a delight to spend almost two hours with these six outstanding actors who have entertained us for decades."

Popular culture/Science fiction website UGO Networks reviewer Jordan Hoffman gave the film a B-rating declaring, if you like this film, "You recognize that William Shatner may be a fool, but he's our fool."

Gregory Weinkauff of The Huffington Post wrote of The Captains that the production was "elegant, enlightening, expansive, and, by turns, hilarious and moving."

== See also ==
- William Shatner's Gonzo Ballet
