= Players Theatre Columbus =

Theatre company in Ohio USA

Players Theatre Columbus was a professional resident theatre company based in Columbus, Ohio. Founded as the Players Club by Agnes Jeffrey Shedd in 1923, the company originated as a private club for local theatre enthusiasts. Over the course of 70 years, the organization evolved into a public community theatre, and finally into a professional resident theatre under contract to Actors' Equity. In 1989, the company moved its operations into the Vern Riffe Center for Government and the Arts, having formerly occupied the Davis Discovery Center on Franklin Avenue.

Players Theatre abruptly folded on September 11, 1993, just days before they were to open their 70th season. At the time, Players was the only professional theatre company in Columbus, as well as the city's oldest non-profit arts institution in continuous operation. An official report cited a range of systemic problems within the organization including "mismanagement, inaccurate and incomplete internal reports, continuing cash-flow crises, lack of cost and auditing controls, and unrealistic budgets and income projections."

At the time of Players' closing, executive staff consisted of Artistic Director Ed Graczyk, Associate Artistic Director Steven C. Anderson, Managing Director Jean Ann Klaus, and President of the Board of Directors Thomas Murrill. Anderson, in charge of Players' youth theatre program, went on to found Phoenix Theatre for Children which merged with the Contemporary American Theatre Company (CATCO) in 2010. Steven C. Anderson retired from CATCO in July 2020.

Among Players' most acclaimed productions in its final decade were the first central Ohio stagings of the musicals Sweeney Todd and Evita. Players originated only a few new works, most notably several other plays by Graczyk.
