= A Perfect Couple (1979 film) =

1979 film by Robert Altman

- Theatrical poster
- Directed by: Robert Altman
- Written by: Allan F. Nicholls; Robert Altman
- Produced by: Robert Altman
- Starring: Paul Dooley; Marta Heflin; Titos Vandis; Belita Moreno
- Cinematography: Edmond L. Koons
- Edited by: Tony Lombardo
- Music by: Allan F. Nicholls
- Distributed by: 20th Century Fox
- Release date: April 6, 1979
- Running time: 110 minutes
- Country: United States
- Language: English
- Budget: $1.9 million

A Perfect Couple is a 1979 romantic-comedy film co-written and directed by Robert Altman and starring Paul Dooley, Marta Heflin, Titos Vandis, and Belita Moreno.

== Plot ==
An older man, played by Paul Dooley, tries romancing a younger woman, played by Marta Heflin. She is part of a travelling band of bohemian musicians who perform gigs in outdoor arenas around the country. He joins them on the road and tries to fit into their communal lifestyle. The film features multiple musical numbers.

== Cast ==
- Paul Dooley as Alex Theodopoulos
- Marta Heflin as Sheila Shea
- Titos Vandis as Panos Theodopoulos
- Belita Moreno as Eleousa
- Henry Gibson as Fred Bott
- Dimitra Arliss as Athena
- Allan F. Nicholls as Dana 115
- Ann Ryerson as Skye 147 Veterinarian
- Poppy Lagos as Melpomeni Bott
- Dennis Franz as Costa
- Margery Bond as Wilma
- Mona Golabek as Mona
- Joel Crothers as Ben
- Susan Blakeman as Penelope Bott
- Melanie Bishop as Star

== Production ==
The role of Sheila Shea was originally written for Sandy Dennis. Paul Dooley was seriously allergic to cats though, and when cat-lover Dennis would come to the script readings with up to five cats at a time, he was briefly hospitalized. As a result, Allan Nicholls re-wrote the role of Sheila Shea from an Earth Mother type to the young singer/groupie played by Marta Heflin.

The band depicted in the film, Keepin' 'Em Off the Streets, was a real group consisting of actors and singers who had previously worked with Nicholls on Broadway musicals. They had been broken up for a time but reunited specifically for the film.

== Music ==
Songs used in the film include:

- "Romance Concerto" (Adieu Mes Amis)" by Thomas Pierson and Allan Nicholls
- "Somp'ins Got a Hold on Me" by Tony Berg and Ted Neeley
- "Hurricane" by Tony Berg, Ted Neeley and Allan Nicholls
- "Week-End Holiday" by Allan Nicholls, B.G. Gibson and Tony Berg
- "Won't Somebody Care" by Tony Berg and Allen Nicholls
- "Love Is All There Is" by Allan Nicholls, Tony Berg & Ted Neeley
- "Searchin' for the Light" by Tomi-Lee Bradley, Tony Berg, Allan Nicholls and Ted Neeley
- "Lonely Millionaire" by Cliff De Young and Tony Berg
- "Fantasy" by Allan Nicholls
- "Don't Take Forever" by Allan Nicholls, B.G. Gibb and Tony Berg
- "Let the Music Play" by Allan Nicholls and Otis Stephens
- "Goodbye Friends" by Allan Nicholls

== Reception ==
Roger Ebert gave the film two-and-a-half stars out of four and wrote: "The movie looks like several good ideas for several movies, made all at once and regardless of whether the pieces fit easily together. That's too bad, because the movie's got so many interesting things in it, so many original characters and, yes, so much interesting music that it shouldn't have been allowed to become such a stylistic confusion." Janet Maslin of The New York Times was negative, writing, "If Mr. Altman keeps on operating at such a small fraction of his powers, his masterworks may begin to look more and more like happy accidents." Variety wrote, "Immensely likeable in some parts, and a complete turn-off in others, 'Perfect Couple' reaffirms both Altman's intelligence and his inaccessibility." Charles Champlin of the Los Angeles Times called the film "perhaps the least attractive and least interesting movie Altman has ever made. It is also what his movies never have been, which is dull." Bruce McCabe of The Boston Globe stated, "I don't want to go so far as to say that this film is Robert Altman's creative death knell but it's plain that he's in deep trouble ... Simply put, Altman doesn't seem to be able to tell a story, any kind of story, any more." Penelope Gilliatt of The New Yorker wrote, "This is not a closely thought-out film, or even a fluent one. Altman may be working too fast. The picture is not packed, in dialogue or characterization."
