= Avery Brooks =

American actor and director

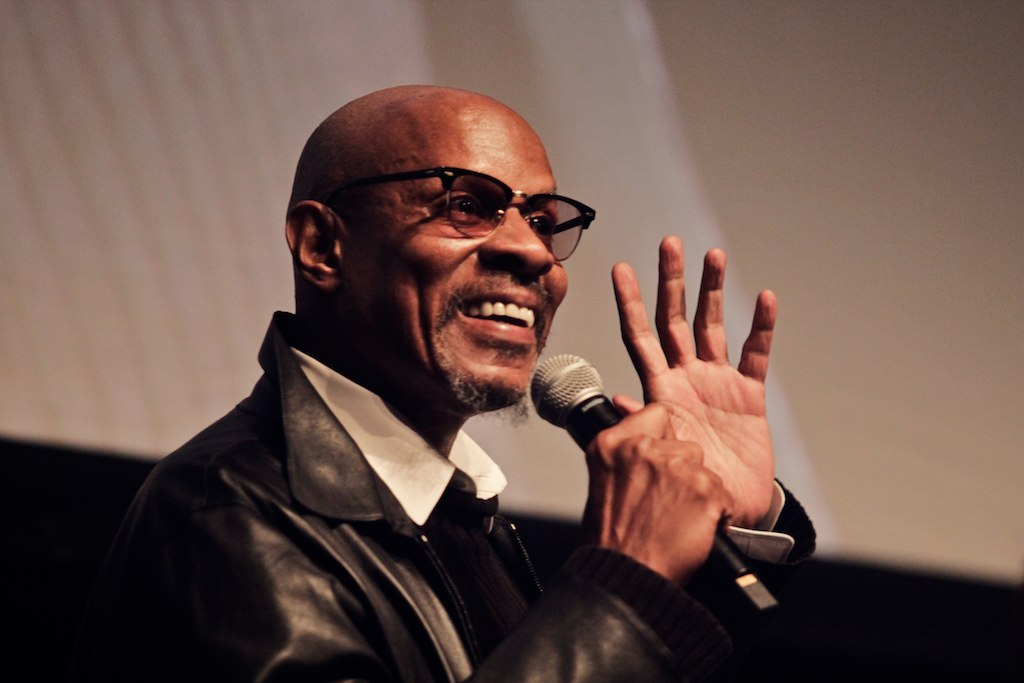
- Brooks at the 2012 Destination Star Trek in London
- Born: Avery Franklin Brooks; October 2, 1948 (age 78); Evansville, Indiana, U.S.
- Education: Indiana University, Bloomington (attended); Oberlin College (attended); Rutgers University, New Brunswick (BA, MFA)
- Occupations: Actor; director; singer; educator
- Years active: 1977–2013
- Spouse: Vicki Bowen (m. 1976)
- Children: 3

Avery Franklin Brooks (born October 2, 1948) is an American actor, director, singer, narrator and educator. He is best known for his television roles as Captain Benjamin Sisko on Star Trek: Deep Space Nine, as Hawk on Spenser: For Hire and its spinoff A Man Called Hawk, and as Dr. Bob Sweeney in the film American History X. Brooks has delivered a variety of other performances to a great deal of acclaim. He has been nominated for a Saturn Award and three NAACP Image Awards. Brooks has also been inducted into the College of Fellows of the American Theatre and bestowed with the William Shakespeare Award for Classical Theatre by the Shakespeare Theatre Company.

== Early life ==
Avery Brooks was born in Evansville, Indiana, the son of Eva Lydia (née Crawford), a choral conductor and music instructor, and Samuel Brooks, a singer and tool and die worker. His maternal grandfather, Samuel Travis Crawford, was also a singer, who graduated from Tougaloo College in 1901. When Avery was eight years old his family moved to Gary, Indiana, after his father had been laid off from International Harvester. Brooks has said: "I was born in Evansville ... but it was Gary, Indiana, that made me."

The Brooks household was filled with music. His mother Eva, who was among the first African-American women to earn a master's degree in music at Northwestern University, taught music wherever the family lived. His father was a member of the Wings Over Jordan Choir, an a cappella spiritual choir best known for performing on CBS radio from 1937 to 1947. His maternal uncle Samuel Travis Crawford was a member of the Delta Rhythm Boys. "Music is all around me and in me, as I am in it," Brooks has said.

Brooks attended Indiana University and Oberlin College. He later completed his Bachelor of Arts plus a Master of Fine Arts from Rutgers University in 1976, becoming the first African American to receive an MFA in acting and directing from Rutgers.

== Career ==
=== Television career ===
==== Spenser: For Hire: Hawk ====
In 1985, Brooks was cast in the role of Hawk on the ABC television detective series Spenser: For Hire, based on the mystery series published by Robert Parker. Hawk became a popular character and the show ran for three seasons. In 1989, Brooks received his own spinoff series, A Man Called Hawk. Brooks said of his role as Hawk: "I never thought of myself as the sidekick... I've never been the side of anything. I just assumed that I was equal."

Brooks returned to play Hawk in four Spenser television movies: Spenser: Ceremony, Spenser: Pale Kings and Princes, Spenser: The Judas Goat and Spenser: A Savage Place.

==== Star Trek: Benjamin Sisko ====
Brooks is best known for his role as Benjamin Sisko on the syndicated science-fiction television series Star Trek: Deep Space Nine which ran for seven seasons from 1993 to 1999. He plays a captain who is also a widower and father.

Brooks won the role of Commander Benjamin Sisko by beating 100 other actors from all racial backgrounds to become the first Black-American captain to lead a Star Trek series. Brooks also directed nine episodes of the series, including "Far Beyond the Stars", an episode focusing on racial injustice.

Series producer Ronald D. Moore said of Brooks:

Avery, like his character (Sisko), is a very complex man. He is not a demanding or ego-driven actor, rather he is a thoughtful and intelligent man who sometimes has insights into the character that no one else has thought about. He has also been unfailingly polite and a classy guy in all my dealings with him.

Brooks was nominated for a Saturn Award and two NAACP Image Awards for the role.

==== Other roles ====
In 1984, Brooks received critical praise for his featured role in PBS's American Playhouse production of Half Slave, Half Free: Solomon Northup's Odyssey, directed by Gordon Parks. The story chronicled the life of Solomon Northup, a free man from New York kidnapped and sold into slavery in 1841 and held until 1853, when he regained his freedom with the help of family and friends. It was adapted from Northup's memoir, Twelve Years a Slave (1853).

Brooks appeared in the 1985 television movie adaptation of Finnegan Begin Again. In 1987, he starred in the role of Uncle Tom in Showtime's filmed adaptation of Uncle Tom's Cabin. Brooks was nominated for an Ace Award in the category of best actor in a movie or miniseries for that role. A third project that allowed Brooks to highlight the history of African Americans was his performance in the 1988 television movie Roots: The Gift, which featured his fellow Star Trek actors LeVar Burton, Kate Mulgrew, and Tim Russ.

During 1998 he also supplied the voice of King Maximus in an episode of the animated TV series, Happily Ever After: Fairy Tales for Every Child entitled "The Golden Goose". Brooks was eventually nominated for an NAACP Image Award within the category of Outstanding Performance in a Youth or Children's Series/Special for the role. He also voiced the character of Nokkar in an episode of the Disney animated series Gargoyles.

In 2001, Brooks narrated and appeared in a series of commercials for IBM.

=== Teaching and cultural work ===
Brooks has taught at Oberlin College and Case Western Reserve University. A graduate of Livingston College and Mason Gross School of the Arts at Rutgers University, he accepted an appointment in 1976 as an associate professor of theater arts at Mason Gross.

From 1993 to 1996, Brooks was artistic director for the National Black Arts Festival in association with Rutgers University. Held annually since 1988 in Atlanta, Georgia, the internationally renowned festival celebrates African-American culture and people of African descent. In addition, Brooks has also done extensive work with the Smithsonian Institution's Program in Black American Culture.

=== Music ===
A deep baritone singer, Brooks has performed on stage with Butch Morris, Lester Bowie, and Jon Hendricks. He also recorded an album with saxophone player James Spaulding, James Spaulding Plays the Legacy of Duke Ellington (Storyville, 1977). Brooks had the lead role in the 1985 Anthony Davis opera X: The Life and Times of Malcolm X, and, later, sang the role of Cinque in Davis's 1992 opera Tania. Also, he performed at the Paris Banlieues Bleues Festival in 2005. In his role as Benjamin Sisko, he performed the Frank Sinatra tune "The Best Is Yet to Come" at the conclusion of the Deep Space Nine episode "Badda-Bing Badda-Bang" as a duet with James Darren.

In a brief venture into scoring, Brooks composed the musical score for the final two episodes of A Man Called Hawk, in which he starred.

In 2006, Brooks released his debut album, Here, an album of jazz and blues covers, as well as spoken word. During 2016 Brooks performed in concert with the Springfield Symphony Orchestra at the Springfield Symphony Hall. In 2020, Brooks was featured on The DX Experiment's debut album, Black In My Own Way, an album of experimental music with spoken word.

=== Theater ===
Brooks received critical acclaim in Phillip Hayes Dean's play Paul Robeson. Brooks portrayed the life of the famous singer, actor, and civil-rights activist in a one-man, critically acclaimed biographical drama. He has performed the role since 1982 at the Westwood Playhouse in Los Angeles, the Kennedy Center in Washington, D.C., and the Longacre Theater on Broadway. He also portrayed Robeson in Are You Now Or Have You Ever Been?, both on- and off-Broadway.

Brooks' early theater credits include The Offering, A PHOTOGRAPH: A Study of Cruelty, and Are You Now or Have You Ever Been? in the 1970s. He started to gain recognition after his appearance in Spell #7 at the Public/Anspache Theater in New York City in 1979. He subsequently starred in Othello at the Folger Shakespeare Festival (1985) and Fences at the Repertory Theater of St. Louis, Missouri, in 1990. He reprised the role of Othello at the Washington Shakespeare Theater in 1990–1991.

During 1994, he was inducted in the College of Fellows of the American Theatre. Brooks later appeared in the title role of The Oedipus Plays, a production that traveled to the 2003 Athens Festival in Greece. He also appeared in the title role of King Lear at Yale's Repertory Theatre. In 2005, Brooks again starred as Othello, this time at the Shakespeare Theatre Company in a production directed by renowned Michael Kahn. Brooks was one of 15 actors of the Shakespeare Theatre Company in Washington, D.C., to be honored with the William Shakespeare Award for Classical Theatre in 2007. He returned to the Shakespeare Theatre Company in Fall 2007 to play the title role in Christopher Marlowe's Tamburlaine. His performance was interrupted when an injury made it necessary for him to take time off to heal.

In September 2008, Brooks played Willy Loman in a production of Death of a Salesman at Oberlin College.

During 2010, Brooks performed in Baltimore Center Stage's production of Kwame Kwei-Armah's play Let There Be Love. Once again, Brooks played the title role of Paul Robeson at the Shakespeare Theater from March 24–27 in 2011.

=== Films ===
Brooks played Dr. Bob Sweeney in American History X (1998) alongside Edward Norton and another Star Trek actor, Jennifer Lien. He also played the role of Paris in the 1998 film The Big Hit, co-starring Mark Wahlberg. His last feature-film role was in 2001 as Detective Leon Jackson in 15 Minutes, which also starred Robert De Niro and Edward Burns.

=== Documentary work ===
Brooks has hosted several documentaries and served as narrator in such features as the IMAX film Africa's Elephant Kingdom. His other documentary credits include narrating Earthquake!, A Passion for Faith, covering the history of black Catholics in America, Eyes on the Prize, Walking with Dinosaurs, Son of God, Land of the Mammoth: Ancient Evidence, The Ballad of Big Al, The Science of Big Al, Savage Sun, Engineering the Impossible (The Colosseum), Greatest Places and Echoes from the White House, and God vs. Satan. He also narrated the three-part series Heart of Africa, consisting of Heart of Africa: Jewel of the Rift, about the lifecycles of African cichlid fish in Lake Tanganyika, Heart of Africa: Virunga, about the gorillas of Virunga National Park, and Heart of Africa: Fire and Ice, about the lowland animals of the Rift Valley.

In May 2007, Brooks recorded the narration for the documentary The Better Hour, which is about the life of William Wilberforce, the man who led the campaign for the end of slavery in the United Kingdom in the late 18th and early 19th centuries.

Brooks also provided the narration for the BBC series Walking with Dinosaurs when it aired in North America on the Discovery Channel. His deep and authoritative voice commanded viewer attention; Brooks was able to draw on his years of training as an opera singer and his extensive stage experience with Shakespeare company actors not only to engage the viewer, but also to use his vocal abilities to emphasize the events as seen in the show.

In 2009, Brooks narrated a special documentary for the National Geographic channel, titled Drain the Ocean. Using CGI animation, National Geographic simulates removing the water from the oceans to explore the ocean floor and its vast geography.

In 2011, Brooks was interviewed by William Shatner in the feature-length documentary The Captains. The film was written and directed by Shatner and features the original Star Trek captain interviewing every other actor who had portrayed a prominently recurring captain, upon whom the science-fiction franchise had yet been based. Brooks also served as music supervisor for the project.

In 2013, Brooks began to narrate the series The Bible's Greatest Secrets, on the American Heroes Channel, which used interpretations of events found in the Bible to illuminate new archeological findings and interpretations of history and to use interpretations of new archeological findings to illuminate interpretations of events found in the Bible. IMDb lists the "Storyline" as: "Unlock the mysteries of vanished civilizations of the Holy Land and the people who built them."

=== Other projects ===
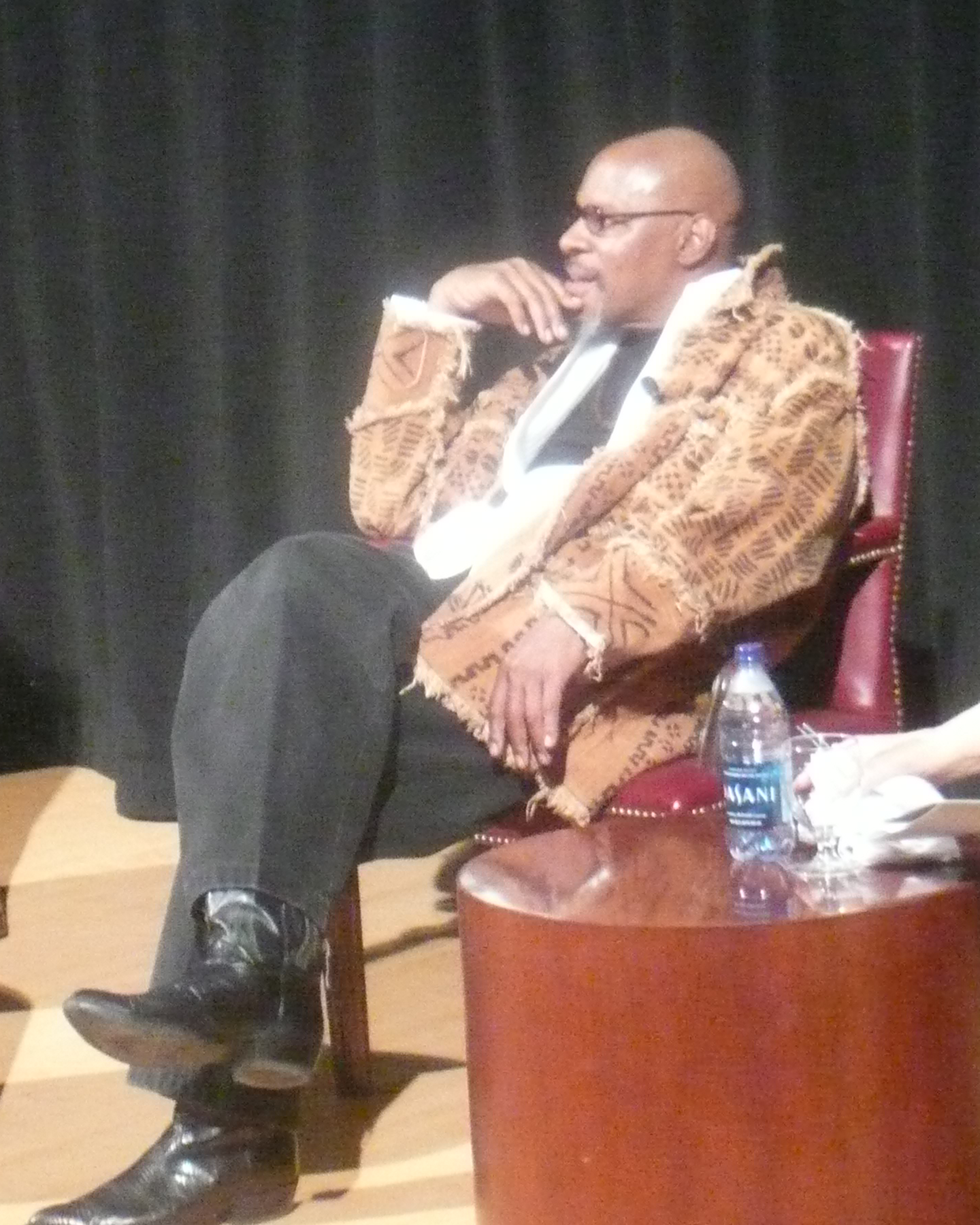
Avery Brooks, 2009

Brooks was part of a directors' panel at a festival celebrating the work of Ntozake Shange at the New Federal Theatre on February 11, 2007. Brooks has directed Shange's Boogie Woogie Landscapes at the John F. Kennedy Center for the Performing Arts and in London's West End.

As part of BBC Audiobooks America's entry into the US market, Brooks narrated an audiobook of Alex Haley's novel Roots: The Saga of an American Family. This was the first time the novel was adapted into an audiobook. Brooks had previously starred in a 1988 television film based upon the book, Roots: The Gift. As an audio book, Roots: The Saga of an American Family won an Audie Award in 2008 within the category of Non-Fiction.

In 2006, Brooks released the album Here, containing, in his words, "a selection of ballads and love songs... I speak of my respect for my father, and for artists that I have listened to all my life." An excerpt from this album would later be used for the Star Trek: Starfleet Academy episode "Series Acclimation Mil".

== Personal life ==
Brooks married his wife, Vicki Lenora Brooks, an assistant dean at Rutgers University, in 1976. They have three children.

Brooks is a fan of baseball and names Dick Allen as his favorite player.

== Filmography ==
=== Film ===
Films in which Avery Brooks has played a role
Year	Title	Role	Notes	Ref.
1987	Moments Without Proper Names	—N/a		
1998	The Big Hit	Paris		
1998	American History X	Dr. Bob Sweeney		
2001	God Lives Underwater: Fame	Detective Leon Jackson	Short film	
2001	15 Minutes	Detective Leon Jackson		
2011	The Captains	Himself	Documentary	

=== Television ===
Television series in which Avery Brooks has played a role
Year	Title	Role	Notes	Ref.
1984	American Playhouse	Solomon Northup	Episode: "Solomon Northup's Odyssey"	
1985	Finnegan Begin Again	Passenger on bus	Television film	
1985–1988	Spenser: For Hire	Hawk	65 episodes	
1987	Uncle Tom's Cabin	Uncle Tom	Television film; Nominated—CableACE Award for Actor in a Movie or Miniseries	
1989	A Man Called Hawk	Hawk	14 episodes	
1988	Roots: The Gift	Cletus Moyer	Television film	
1993	The Ernest Green Story	Rev. Lawson	Television film	
1993	Spenser: Ceremony	Hawk	Television film	
1993–1999	Star Trek: Deep Space Nine	Commander/Captain Benjamin Sisko	174 episodes; Nominated—NAACP Image Award for Outstanding Actor in a Drama Series (1997–98); Nominated—Saturn Award for Best Actor on Television	
1994	Spenser: Pale Kings and Princes	Hawk	Television film	
1994	Spenser: The Judas Goat	Hawk	Television film	
1995	Spenser: A Savage Place	Hawk	Television film	
1996	Gargoyles	Nokkar	Voice, episode: "Sentinel"	
1997	Happily Ever After: Fairy Tales for Every Child	King Maximus	Voice, episode: "The Golden Goose"	
2000	Walking with Dinosaurs	Narrator	Documentary	
2026	Starfleet Academy	Captain Benjamin Sisko	Voice, episode: "Series Acclimation Mil"	

=== Video games ===
Video games with characters voiced by Avery Brooks
Year	Title	Role	Notes	Ref.
1996	Star Trek: Deep Space Nine: Harbinger	Capt. Benjamin Sisko		
2006	Star Trek: Legacy	Capt. Benjamin Sisko		
