= Brussels Independent Film Festival =

Belgian film festival founded in 1974

Coordinates: 50°49′45.55″N 4°20′40.38″E

- Location: Brussels, Belgium
- Founded: 1974
- Website: brusselsfilmfestival.org

The Brussels Independent Film Festival, formerly known as Brussels International Independent Film Festival (French: Festival International du Film Indépendant de Bruxelles), is a film festival that takes place in Brussels, Belgium.

== History ==
The festival has taken place since 1974 in Brussels, Belgium, originally known as Brussels International Independent Film Festival. Its initial incarnation ran for 38 years before being suspended in 2012.

It was revived in 2018.

== Description ==
The festival originally focused on Super 8 films, but has since evolved into a showcase for a wide range of independent cinema.

The festival has hosted filmmakers such as Pedro Almodovar, François Ozon, and Nanni Moretti.

== Recognition ==
It is listed as one of the "Top 50 Best Film Festivals" by Final Cut Magazine.
