= A Wedding (1978 film) =

1978 film by Robert Altman

- Theatrical release poster
- Directed by: Robert Altman
- Screenplay by: Robert Altman; John Considine; Allan F. Nicholls; Patricia Resnick
- Story by: Robert Altman; John Considine
- Produced by: Robert Altman
- Starring: Desi Arnaz Jr. Carol Burnett; Geraldine Chaplin; Howard Duff; Mia Farrow; Vittorio Gassman; Lillian Gish; Lauren Hutton; Viveca Lindfors; Pat McCormick; Dina Merrill; Nina Van Pallandt
- Cinematography: Charles Rosher Jr.
- Edited by: Tony Lombardo
- Production company: Lion's Gate Films, Inc.
- Distributed by: 20th Century Fox
- Release date: August 29, 1978
- Running time: 125 minutes
- Country: United States
- Language: English
- Budget: $3.9 million
- Box office: $8 million

A Wedding is a 1978 American satirical comedy-drama film directed by Robert Altman, with an ensemble cast that includes Desi Arnaz, Jr., Carol Burnett, Paul Dooley, Vittorio Gassman, Mia Farrow, Lillian Gish, Geraldine Chaplin, Howard Duff, Nina Van Pallandt, Amy Stryker, and Pat McCormick. The story is told in typical Altman style, with multiple plots and overlapping humorous dialogue.

The story takes place in a single day during a lavish wedding that merges a nouveau riche Southern family with an established wealthy Chicago family having possible ties to organized crime.

== Plot ==
Dino Corelli marries Muffin Brenner and attends the reception at the Corelli mansion. Bedridden matriarch Nettie Sloan, mother of Dino's mother Regina Sloan Corelli, is being tended by disreputable Dr. Jules Meecham. While speaking with wedding planner Rita Billingsley, Nettie suddenly dies. Meecham informs Dino's father, Luigi Corelli, but Luigi is unable to tell his wife Regina because she is mentally unstable. Nettie's corpse remains in bed throughout the reception, while various attendees visit her room without realizing she's dead. By the time bossy daughter Toni finds out and plans a dramatic announcement, other family members have already found out through the grapevine.

The Brenners are a nouveau riche family from Louisville, Kentucky, where Muffin's father, "Snooks", made millions in the trucking industry. The Corellis are an old money family from North Shore Chicago. Because of rumors that Luigi has mob connections, virtually every invitee sent regrets. Only one guest (other than family members) attends. Nevertheless, Rita is determined to run the reception by the book, setting up a receiving line for the one guest and asking family members and staff to go down the line so it will not look empty.

A series of disasters unfolds, including the display of an embarrassing nude portrait of the bride; caterer Ingrid Hellstrom becoming ill, then getting high and causing a disturbance after Meecham gives her a pill; and a tornado when the cake is to be cut, forcing everyone to find shelter in the cellar. Two guests arrive late: the groom and bride's disgruntled exes, Tracy Farrell and Wilson Briggs, who bond over their shared anger.

Unsavory family drama unfolds. Regina is a drug addict. Her marriage was arranged by Nettie after Luigi met Regina while working as a waiter in Italy. Luigi was forced to change his name and be estranged from his Italian family for 22 years. His Italian-speaking brother unexpectedly shows up, and when Meecham reminds Luigi that Nettie is dead and can no longer impose the marriage conditions, Luigi is thrilled to see his long-lost brother. Regina's sister Clarice has a romance with her African-American butler, Randolph; her other sister, Toni, is married to Mack Goddard, who falls in love at first sight with Tulip Brenner, mother of the bride, and tries to woo her.

Snooks has a borderline incestuous attachment to his nearly mute daughter Buffy, the maid of honor, who speaks at the reception only once, to tell Dino she is pregnant and he is the father. Not wanting to be upstaged by the bride, Buffy disrobes in front of Muffin's nude portrait. Dino confides to Wilson about Buffy's pregnancy; Wilson tells Tracy, who vindictively spreads the news. Snooks confronts Dino, who admits to sleeping with Buffy but says she also slept with nearly every member of his military-school barracks. Snooks's sister from New Jersey, Marge Spar, starts romancing the Corellis' gardener, while bridesmaid Rosie Bean is unaware her shy friend Shelby Munker is having an affair with Rosie's husband Russell.

Muffin and Dino prepare to leave for their honeymoon in a new car, the Corellis' wedding gift. Muffin is rattled when Rita makes an unexpected pass at her. She then finds Dino in the shower with his groomsman, Reedley Roots, seemingly engaged in a gay sexual encounter. Actually, Dino has passed out drunk and Reedly is just holding him up straight while trying to sober him up. The newlyweds' car is seen driving away, and the families assume Dino and Muffin left without saying goodbye. Snooks drives his family back to their hotel. They see Dino's car wrecked and in flames, and rush back to the mansion to share the awful news. The families are grieving when Muffin and Dino appear from upstairs, having never left because of Dino's passing out. When Luigi remembers that the car keys were last seen in Wilson's possession, it becomes clear that Wilson (presumably accompanied by Tracy, since she is nowhere to be found), out for revenge, stole the car and died in the crash. Tulip privately declares the incident was God punishing her for sinful thoughts of having an affair with Mack.

Luigi pays his respects to Nettie. He tells her corpse he kept his bargain for 22 years, and no one there knows who he really is. Now he will take his leave. He finds his brother in the bushes, making love with Buffy. Luigi and his brother happily drive away as a half-dressed Buffy waves goodbye.

== Cast ==
- Desi Arnaz Jr. as Dino Sloan Corelli
- Carol Burnett as Katherine "Tulip" Brenner
- Geraldine Chaplin as Rita Billingsley
- Howard Duff as Dr. Jules Meecham
- Mia Farrow as Elizabeth "Buffy" Brenner
- Vittorio Gassman as Luigi Corelli
- Lillian Gish as Nettie Sloan
- Nina Van Pallandt as Regina Sloan Corelli
- John Cromwell as Bishop Martin
- Paul Dooley as Liam "Snooks" Brenner
- Peggy Ann Garner as Candice Ruteledge
- Amy Stryker as Muffin Brenner
- Dennis Christopher as Hughie Brenner
- Gerald Busby as Reverend David Ruteledge
- Mark Deming as Matthew Ruteledge
- Lesley Rogers as Rosie Bean
- Tim Thomerson as Russell Bean
- Marta Heflin as Shelby Munker
- Mary Seibel as Aunt Marge Spar
- Margaret Ladd as Ruby Spar
- Belita Moreno as Daphne Corelli
- Luigi (Gigi) Proietti as Dino Corelli I, Brother of Luigi
- Virginia Vestoff as Clarice Sloan

- Dina Merrill as Antoinette "Toni" Sloan Goddard
- Pat McCormick as Mackenzie "Mack" Goddard
- Ruth Nelson as Aunt Beatrice Sloan Cory
- Ann Ryerson as Victoria Cory
- Cedric Scott as Randolph
- Craig Richard Nelson as Captain Reedley Roots
- Jeff Perry as "Bunky" LeMay
- Beverly Ross as Nurse Janet Schulman
- Viveca Lindfors as Ingrid Hellstrom
- Lauren Hutton as Florence Farmer
- Allan F. Nicholls as Jake Jacobs
- Susan Kendall Newman as Chris Clinton
- John Considine as Jeff Kuykendall
- Dennis Franz as Koons
- Pam Dawber as Tracy Farrell
- Gavan O'Herlihy as Wilson Briggs
- Robert Fortier as Jim Habor
- Bert Remsen as William Williamson

Several actors who later had notable film or television careers appeared as extras, including John Malkovich, Gary Sinise, Laurie Metcalf, Dennis Franz, Alan Wilder, and George Wendt.

== Production ==
The film was inspired by a remark Altman made while doing publicity for 3 Women. Upon being asked what his next movie would be, Altman jokingly replied that he was going to shoot a wedding next. Later, Altman and his production assistant decided to follow through on the idea and began planning the film.

The film was shot almost exclusively over an 8-week period at the Lester Armor House in Lake Bluff, Illinois.

The role of Bishop Martin was the final film appearance by longtime actor and director John Cromwell, who died on September 26, 1979, at age 91. Cromwell's wife of 33 years, Ruth Nelson, appeared as Aunt Beatrice Sloan Cory.

A Wedding was the 100th film in which Lillian Gish appeared.

== Reception ==
Roger Ebert gave A Wedding 3 1/2 out of 4 stars, writing "It begins in comedy, it moves into realms of social observation, it descends into personal revelations that are sometimes tragic, sometimes comic, and then it ends in a way that turns everything back upon itself. The more you think about what Altman's done, the more impressive his accomplishment becomes". Gene Siskel gave it one-and-a-half stars out of four, writing "Altman mistreats us to one boob after another. He appears not to care for any one of the people involved here. He creates pompous straw men and women and then he ridicules them. It's a particularly mean-spirited movie likely to please no one". Variety wrote "Altman's loose, seemingly unstructured style backfires in this comedy drama. Even the innovative director-producer's legion of fans will be disappointed. Those already not a member of his cult will find this work tedious". Charles Champlin of the Los Angeles Times wrote "Altman in A Wedding, for all his undifferentiated sport with the upper reaches of the middle class, remains the entertaining satirist rather more than the angry scold. Still we have all come a long way from Father of the Bride, and A Wedding is an original and funny piece of work". Jack Kroll of Newsweek called it "one of Altman's best films, at once one of his funniest and one of his darkest visions of a crazy, contradictory America". Gary Arnold of The Washington Post wrote "Musically and pictorially, Altman can't hide his condescension. He has invented a wedding party, ostensibly a misalliance between old but tarnished Midwestern aristocracy and new, uncouth Southern wealth, but that seems to inspire him to nothing but stale jokes and complacent contempt". Pauline Kael of The New Yorker wrote "There's no way to get into the movie; it's like a busted bag of marbles—people are running every way at once".

On Rotten Tomatoes, the film has an approval rating of 69%, based on 13 reviews, with an average rating of 6.4/10.

== Awards and nominations ==
Award	Date of the ceremony	Category	Recipients	Result	Ref.
San Sebastian International Film Festival	8–19 September 1978	Silver Shell for Best Actress	Carol Burnett	Won	
Writers Guild of America Awards	1979	Best Original Screenplay	John Considine, Patricia Resnick, Allan F. Nicholls, and Robert Altman	Nominated	
Golden Globe Awards	27 January 1979	Best Supporting Actress – Motion Picture	Carol Burnett	Nominated	
César Awards	3 February 1979	Best Foreign Film	A Wedding	Nominated	
British Academy Film Awards	22 March 1979	Best Direction	Robert Altman	Nominated	
British Academy Film Awards	22 March 1979	Best Screenplay	John Considine, Patricia Resnick, Allan F. Nicholls, and Robert Altman	Nominated	

== Opera ==
A Wedding is a 2004 comic opera based on Altman's film, composed by William Bolcom, with a libretto written by Robert Altman and Arnold Weinstein.

== See also ==
- List of American films of 1978
