= Thieves Like Us =

Thieves Like Us may refer to:

- Thieves Like Us (novel), a 1937 novel by Edward Anderson
- Thieves Like Us (film), a 1974 film directed by Robert Altman
- "Thieves Like Us" (song), a 1984 song by New Order
- Thieves Like Us (TV series), a 2007 British sitcom
- Thieves Like Us (band), a New York and Sweden based electronica music group
- Thieves Like Us, episode 65 and series finale of Police Academy: The Animated Series
