= Jean Evans =

Jean Evans may refer to:

- Jean Evans (politician) (born July 24, 1966) is an American politician
- Jean Evans (writer), (born 1913 – ?), was a Canadian journalist and non-fiction writer
- Jean Lambert Evans, (born 1998), is a French footballer

== See also ==
- Jean (disambiguation)
- Evans (disambiguation)
