= Side Street (1949 film) =

1949 film by Anthony Mann

- Theatrical release poster
- Directed by: Anthony Mann
- Written by: Sydney Boehm
- Produced by: Sam Zimbalist
- Starring: Farley Granger; Cathy O'Donnell; James Craig; Jean Hagen
- Narrated by: Paul Kelly
- Cinematography: Joseph Ruttenberg
- Edited by: Conrad A. Nervig
- Music by: Lennie Hayton
- Production company: Metro-Goldwyn-Mayer
- Distributed by: Metro-Goldwyn-Mayer
- Release date: December 14, 1949 (United States)
- Running time: 83 minutes
- Country: United States
- Language: English
- Budget: $935,000
- Box office: $777,000

Side Street is a 1949 American film noir police procedural film starring Farley Granger and Cathy O'Donnell. Directed by Anthony Mann, the picture was filmed on location throughout New York City and culminates in one of the first modern car chases. Part of the story is set in the vicinity of the long-demolished Third Avenue El, a favorite location of the films made in the city during that era.

Granger and O’Donnell were paired for the second and last time; their earlier film was the film noir They Live by Night (1948).

== Plot ==
Joe Norson lives with his wife and her parents in New York City. He has lost his gas-station job and found work as a part-time mailman. Because he wants the best for his pregnant wife Ellen, Joe rationalizes stealing what he thinks is $200 from a lawyer's office on his route. He discovers that he has actually stolen $30,000 from Victor Backett, a corrupt attorney. Backett has framed wealthy broker Emil Lorrison in a sex scandal, then extorted the money from Lorrison with the help of Lucille "Lucky" Colner and ex-con and accomplice Georgie Garsell.

Joe begins to panic and he explains his newfound wealth to Ellen as a lucrative out-of-town job, then disguises the money as a package and leaves it with bartender Nick Drumman.

Lucille's body is found in the East River, the victim of a strangulation. Captain Walter Anderson of the New York Police Department investigates the murder. Both Lorrison and Backett are interviewed, their names having been found in Lucille's "love diary." After the birth of his son, Joe tries to return the money, but Backett suspects a trap and refuses the offer. Backett instead sends Garsell and a taxi driver to grab Joe and recover the cash. They find that Drumman has substituted a nightgown in the package and gone into hiding with the money.

Joe is able to escape and looks for the bartender, but Garsell finds Drumman first, strangles him, and recovers the money. Joe confesses the original theft to Ellen, who urges him to surrender to the police, but he finds himself a suspect in Drumman's murder. He tries to locate the source of the money to clear himself, even as Captain Anderson pursues Garsell for the murder of Lucille and Joe for that of Drumman. Joe locates Garsell's girlfriend, singer Harriet Sinton, but she betrays Joe to Garsell, who plans to murder Joe and strangles Harriet to eliminate her as a witness. Captain Anderson is hot on their heels and a chase ensues through the early-morning streets of New York. Garsell's accomplice, the taxi driver, tries to surrender to the police, so Garsell shoots him and forces Joe to drive, and Joe deliberately crashes the taxi. Garsell climbs out of the wreckage and is killed in an exchange of gunfire with the police. Ellen arrives and finds Joe seriously but not mortally injured. She embraces him before the police load him into an ambulance.

== Cast ==
- Farley Granger as Joe Norson
- Cathy O'Donnell as Ellen Norson
- James Craig as Georgie Garsell
- Paul Kelly as Captain Walter Anderson
- Jean Hagen as Harriet Sinton
- Paul Harvey as Emil Lorrison
- Edmon Ryan as Victor Backett
- Charles McGraw as Stanley Simon, detective
- Edwin Max as Nick Drumman
- Adele Jergens as Lucille "Lucky" Colner
- Harry Bellaver as Larry Giff, cab driver
- Whit Bissell as Harold Simpsen, chief teller
- John Gallaudet as Gus Heldon, bar owner
- Esther Somers as Mrs. Malby, Ellen's mother
- Harry Antrim as Mr. Malby, Ellen's father
- Ben Cooper as the young man at the dry cleaner
- King Donovan as Detective Gottschalk
- David Bauer as Smitty, the cab driver
- Anthony Dexter as Radio Clerk (uncredited)
- Herb Vigran as Photographer (uncredited)

== Reception ==
In a contemporary review for The New York Times, critic Bosley Crowther compared Side Street to the Crime Does Not Pay series of film shorts and wrote: "In short, it's a fair enough crime picture, ending with a screaming downtown chase and the moral very tenderly delivered by the usual narrator's voice. But, cut down to its essentials, that's just about all it is: in short. It can only be fully recommended to those who have a deep and morbid interest in crime."

Critic Dorothy Masters of the New York Daily News wrote: "Filmed largely in New York, the movie generates most of its tension through the maneuverings of a murder suspect trying to elude a police dragnet. For a bonus, it has the hunted man in pursuit of the real killer. For dividends, the exciting plot pays off in skillful timing, good performances and effective photography."

According to MGM records, the film earned $448,000 in the U.S. and Canada and $323,000 elsewhere, resulting in a loss of $467,000.

== Adaptations ==
The film was adapted for Australian radio in 1951.
