= Anthony Ray =

Anthony Ray may refer to:

- Sir Mix-a-Lot (Anthony L. Ray), American rapper, songwriter and record producer
- Anthony Ray (producer), American actor, producer and production manager

== See also ==
- Ray Anthony, American bandleader and musician
