= Gloria Grahame =

American actress (1923–1981)

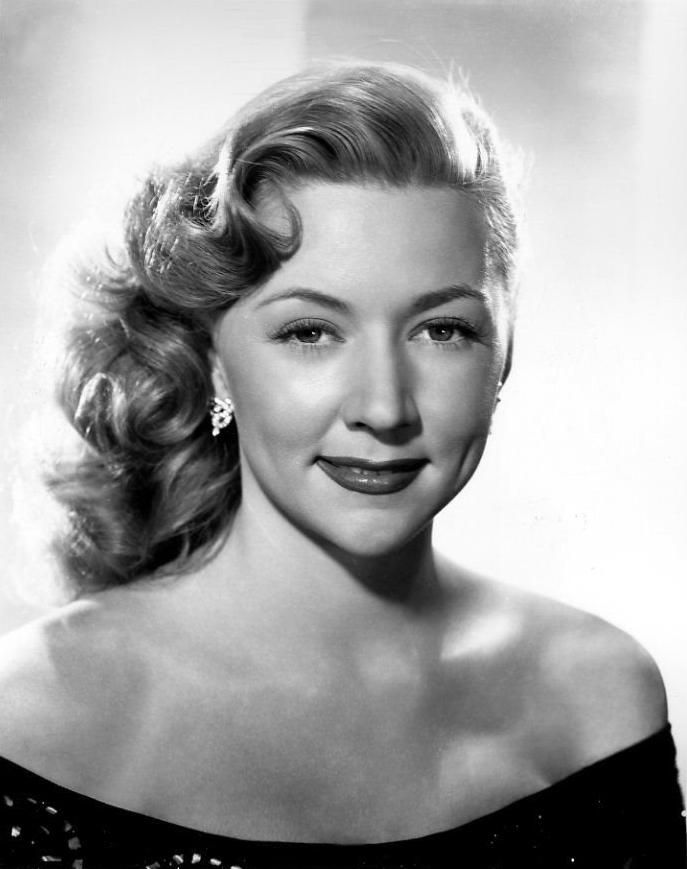
- Grahame in the 1940s
- Born: Gloria Penelope Hallward; November 28, 1923; Los Angeles, California, U.S.
- Died: October 5, 1981 (aged 57); New York City, U.S.
- Occupation: Actress
- Years active: 1942–1981
- Known for: Oklahoma! It's a Wonderful Life; The Bad and the Beautiful; Crossfire
- Spouses: Stanley Clements (m. 1945; div. 1948) Nicholas Ray (m. 1948; div. 1952) Cy Howard (m. 1954; div. 1957) Anthony Ray (m. 1960; div. 1974)
- Children: 4
- Relatives: Anthony Ray (stepson, 1948–1952); Nicholas Ray (father-in-law, 1960–1974)
- Awards: Academy Award for Best Supporting Actress (1952); Hollywood Walk of Fame (1960)

Gloria Grahame (born Gloria Penelope Hallward; November 28, 1923 – October 5, 1981) was an American actress. She began her acting career in theater and in 1944 made her first film for MGM. Many biographies indicate she was born Gloria Grahame Hallward, but she adopted the surname Grahame, her mother's acting name, as her professional name.

Despite a featured role in It's a Wonderful Life (1946), MGM did not believe she had the potential for major success and sold her contract to RKO. Often cast in film noir projects, Grahame was nominated for an Academy Award for Best Supporting Actress for Crossfire (1947) and later won the award for her work in The Bad and the Beautiful (1952). After starring opposite Humphrey Bogart in In a Lonely Place (1950), she achieved her highest profile with Sudden Fear (1952), The Big Heat (1953), Human Desire (1954), and Oklahoma! (1955), but her film career began to wane soon afterwards. She returned to work on the stage, but continued to appear in films and television productions, usually in supporting roles.

She was diagnosed with breast cancer in 1974. It went into remission less than a year later and Grahame returned to work. The cancer returned in 1980, but she continued working and traveled to the United Kingdom to appear in a play. By 1981, her health had declined rapidly, and at her family's insistence, she returned to New York City on October 5, 1981, dying the same day at St. Vincent's Hospital at the age of 57.

== Early life ==
Grahame was born in Los Angeles, the younger child of Michael and Jean Hallward. She was raised a Methodist. Her English father, Reginald Michael Bloxam Hallward (later known as Michael Hallward) was an architect and author; her Scottish mother, Jean McDougall, who used the stage name Jean Grahame, was a stage actress and acting teacher. Grahame's only sibling, her elder sister Joy Hallward, was an actress who married John Mitchum (younger brother of actor Robert Mitchum). During Gloria's childhood and adolescence, her mother taught her acting. Grahame attended Hollywood High School before dropping out to pursue acting.

== Career ==
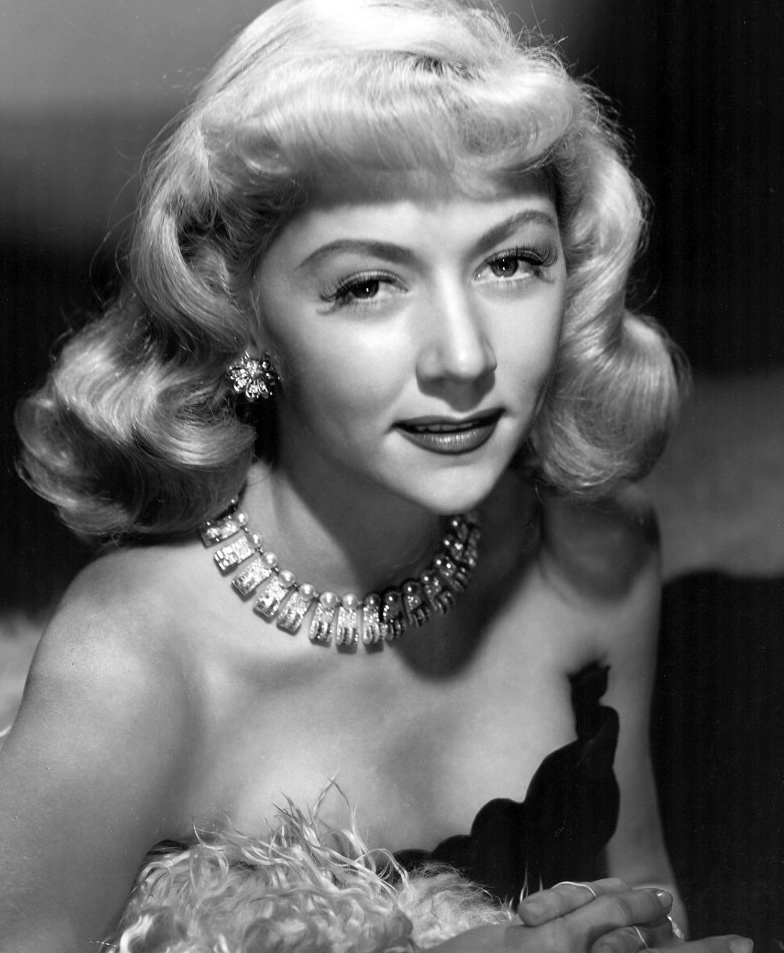
Grahame (1947)

An early stage appearance by her was in the long-running farce Good Night, Ladies at Chicago's Blackstone Theatre, starring Buddy Ebsen, which opened on April 12, 1942.

Grahame made her Broadway debut on December 6, 1943, at the Royale Theatre as Florrie in Nunnally Johnson's The World's Full of Girls, which was adapted from Thomas Bell's 1943 novel Till I Come Back to You. She was signed to a contract with MGM Studios under her professional name after Louis B. Mayer saw her performance. Another Broadway role was in April-May 1944's Highland Fling. She made her film debut in Blonde Fever (1944) and then achieved one of her most widely praised roles as the vixenish Violet Bick, saved from disgrace by George Bailey in It's a Wonderful Life (1946). MGM felt unable to develop her potential as a star, and her contract was sold to RKO Studios in 1947.

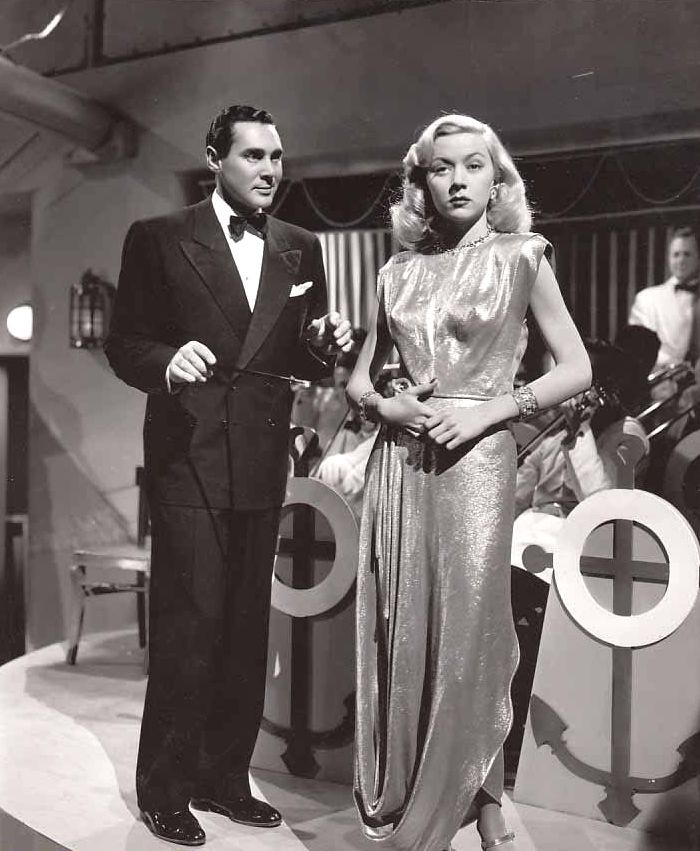
Grahame with Philip Reed in Song of the Thin Man (1947)

Grahame was often featured in film noir pictures as a tarnished beauty with an irresistible sexual allure. During this time, she made films for several Hollywood studios. She received an Oscar nomination for Best Supporting Actress for Crossfire (1947).

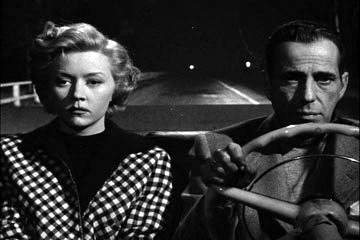
Grahame and Humphrey Bogart in In a Lonely Place (1950)

Grahame starred with Humphrey Bogart in the film In a Lonely Place (1950) for Columbia Pictures, a performance for which she gained praise. Though today it is considered among her finest performances, it was not a box-office hit, and Howard Hughes, owner of RKO, admitted that he never saw it. When she asked to be lent out for roles in Born Yesterday (also 1950) and A Place in the Sun (1951), Hughes refused and instead made her perform a supporting role in Macao (1952).

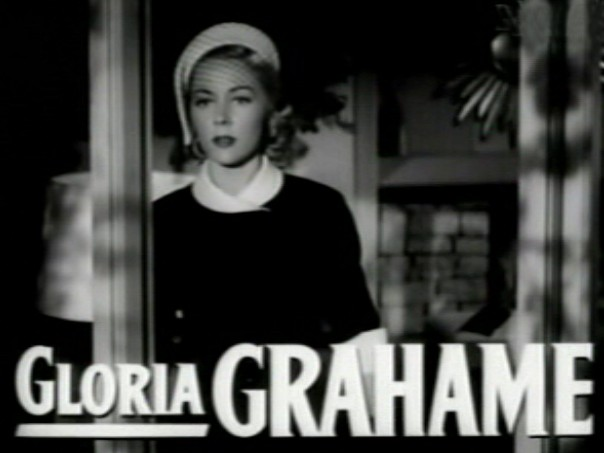
Gloria Grahame in her Academy Award-winning role in The Bad and the Beautiful (1952)

Despite appearing for only a little over nine minutes on screen, she won the Academy Award for Best Supporting Actress in MGM's The Bad and the Beautiful (also 1952); she long held the record for the shortest performance on screen to win an acting Oscar until Beatrice Straight won for Network (1976) with a five-minute performance.

Grahame's other memorable roles included the scheming Irene Neves in Sudden Fear (also 1952); mob moll Debby Marsh in Fritz Lang's The Big Heat (1953) in which, in a horrifying off-screen scene, she is scarred by hot coffee thrown in her face by Lee Marvin's character; and the femme fatale Vicki Buckley in Fritz Lang's Human Desire (1954). Grahame appeared as wealthy seductress Harriet Lang in Stanley Kramer's Not as a Stranger (1955) starring Olivia de Havilland, Robert Mitchum, and Frank Sinatra. Grahame also did her own stunts as Angel the Elephant Girl in Cecil B. DeMille's The Greatest Show on Earth, which won the Oscar for best film of 1952.

Grahame's career began to wane after her performance in the musical film Oklahoma! (1955). She, whom audiences were used to seeing as a film noir siren, was viewed by some critics to be miscast as an ignorant country lass in a wholesome musical, and the paralysis of her upper lip from plastic surgery altered her speech and appearance. Additionally, she was rumored to have been difficult on the set of Oklahoma!, upstaging some of the cast and alienating her co-stars.

Grahame also guest-starred in television series, including the science-fiction series The Outer Limits. In the 1964 episode of that series titled "The Guests", Grahame plays a forgotten film star living in the past. She also appears in an episode of The Fugitive ("The Homecoming", 1964) and an episode of Burke's Law ("Who Killed The Rabbit's Husband", 1965). Grahame can be seen also in a 1970 episode of Mannix titled "Duet for Three" (season four, episode 13) and in small roles in the miniseries Rich Man, Poor Man and Seventh Avenue.

The play The Time of Your Life was revived on March 17, 1972, at the Huntington Hartford Theater in Los Angeles with Grahame, Henry Fonda, Richard Dreyfuss, Lewis J. Stadlen, Ron Thompson, Jane Alexander, Richard X. Slattery, and Pepper Martin among the cast, and Edwin Sherin directing.

== Personal life ==
Over time, Grahame became increasingly concerned with her physical appearance; she particularly felt her upper lip was too thin and had ridges that were too deep. She began stuffing cotton or tissues under it, which she felt gave her a sexier look. Several co-stars discovered this during kissing scenes. In the mid-1940s, Grahame began undergoing small cosmetic procedures on her lips and face. According to her niece, Vicky Mitchum, Grahame's obsession with vanity led her to undergo more cosmetic procedures that rendered her upper lip immobile because of nerve damage. Mitchum said, "Over the years, she [Grahame] carved herself up, trying to make herself into an image of beauty she felt should exist but didn't. Others saw her as a beautiful person, but she never did, and crazy things spread from that."

=== Relationships, marriages, and children ===
Grahame was married four times and had four children. Her first marriage was to actor Stanley Clements in August 1945. They divorced in June 1948.

The day after her divorce from Clements was final, Grahame married director Nicholas Ray. They had a son. After several separations and reconciliations, Grahame and Ray divorced in 1952.

According to Glenn Ford's son Peter, Grahame had an affair with Ford during the filming of Human Desire in 1954.

Grahame's third marriage was to writer and TV producer Cy Howard. They married in August 1954 and had a daughter. Grahame filed for divorce from Howard in May 1957, citing mental cruelty. Their divorce was final as of November 1957.

Grahame's fourth and final marriage was to actor Anthony "Tony" Ray, when he was 23 years old and she was 37. He was the son of her second husband Nicholas Ray and his first wife Jean Evans, and was Grahame's former stepson. According to Nicholas Ray, he caught Grahame and a 13-year-old Tony in bed together, which effectively ended their marriage in 1950. However, Grahame's former partner and biographer, Peter Turner, disputed this, saying the story of Tony being underage when Grahame began a sexual relationship with him is "fiction". Grahame and Anthony Ray began dating in 1958 and married in Tijuana, Mexico, in May 1960. The couple had two boys born during the marriage.

News of the 1960 marriage to Tony was kept private until 1962, when it was written about in the tabloids. The ensuing scandal damaged Grahame's reputation and affected her career. After learning of her marriage to Anthony Ray, Grahame's third husband, Cy Howard, attempted to gain sole custody of the couple's daughter. Howard claimed Grahame was an unfit mother, and the two fought over custody of their daughter for years. The stress of the scandal, her waning career, and her custody battle with Howard took its toll on Grahame and she had a nervous breakdown. She later underwent electroconvulsive therapy in 1964.

Despite the scandal, Grahame's marriage to Anthony Ray was the only one of four to last beyond four years, ending a few days short of their 14th anniversary in May 1974.

From 1979 to 1981, Grahame had a relationship with British actor Peter Turner. Turner authored a book about his time with Grahame called Film Stars Don't Die in Liverpool, which was later turned into a movie of the same title.

== Death ==
Grahame was diagnosed with breast cancer in March 1974. She underwent radiation treatment, changed her diet, stopped smoking and drinking alcohol, and sought homeopathic remedies and Christian Science treatment. In less than a year, the cancer went into remission but returned in 1980. Grahame fell ill while performing at The Dukes in Lancaster, England, in the fall of 1981.

She contacted her former lover, actor Peter Turner, and asked him not to contact doctors or her family (which he did anyway). According to Turner's memoir, Film Stars Don't Die in Liverpool, Turner's local family physician told Grahame she had a cancerous tumor "the size of a football" in her abdomen. Breast cancer is not mentioned in the book. Turner informed Grahame's children of her illness; they brought her back to the United States against her wishes and those of her doctor and Turner. She was immediately admitted to St. Vincent's Hospital in Manhattan on October 5, 1981, where she died a few hours later of stomach cancer and peritonitis at age 57.

Grahame's remains were interred at Oakwood Memorial Park Cemetery in Chatsworth, Los Angeles.

== Legacy ==
For her contributions to the motion-picture industry, Grahame had a star placed on the Hollywood Walk of Fame at 6522 Hollywood Boulevard on February 8, 1960.

The movie Film Stars Don't Die in Liverpool (2017), based on Peter Turner's account of the final years of Grahame's life, was released in the United Kingdom on November 16, 2017. The film was released in the United States on December 29, 2017. In the film, Grahame was portrayed by Annette Bening.

Grahame had kept an apartment at the Manhattan Plaza residential complex, and its community room, where her portrait hangs, is dedicated to her.

== Filmography ==
Year	Title	Role	Notes
1944	Blonde Fever	Sally Murfin	Alternative title: Autumn Fever
1945	Without Love	Flower girl	
1946	It's a Wonderful Life	Violet Bick	
1947	It Happened in Brooklyn	Nurse	
1947	Crossfire	Ginny Tremaine	Nominated – Academy Award for Best Supporting Actress
1947	Song of the Thin Man	Fran Ledue Page	
1947	Merton of the Movies	Beulah Baxter	
1949	A Woman's Secret	Susan Caldwell aka Estrellita	
1949	Roughshod	Mary Wells	
1950	In a Lonely Place	Laurel Gray	
1952	The Greatest Show on Earth	Angel	
1952	Macao	Margie	
1952	Sudden Fear	Irene Neves	
1952	The Bad and the Beautiful	Rosemary Bartlow	Academy Award for Best Supporting Actress; Nominated – Golden Globe Award for Best Supporting Actress – Motion Picture
1953	The Glass Wall	Maggie Summers	
1953	Man on a Tightrope	Zama Cernik	
1953	The Big Heat	Debby Marsh	
1953	Prisoners of the Casbah	Princess Nadja aka Yasmin	
1954	The Good Die Young	Denise Blaine	
1954	Human Desire	Vicki Buckley	
1954	Naked Alibi	Marianna	
1955	The Cobweb	Karen McIver	
1955	Not as a Stranger	Harriet Lang	
1955	Oklahoma!	Ado Annie Carnes	
1956	The Man Who Never Was	Lucy Sherwood	
1957	Ride Out for Revenge	Amy Porter	
1959	Odds Against Tomorrow	Helen	
1966	Ride Beyond Vengeance	Bonnie Shelley	
1971	Blood and Lace	Mrs. Deere	
1971	The Todd Killings	Mrs. Roy	
1971	Black Noon	Bethia	
1971	Chandler	Selma	Alternative title: Open Shadow
1972	The Loners	Annabelle	
1973	The Magician	Natalie	Alternative title: Tarot
1974	Mama's Dirty Girls	Mama Love	
1976	Mansion of the Doomed	Katherine	Alternative title: The Terror of Dr. Chaney
1979	A Nightingale Sang in Berkeley Square	Ma Fox	
1979	Chilly Scenes of Winter	Clara	Alternative title: Head Over Heels
1980	Melvin and Howard	Mrs. Sisk	
1981	The Nesting	Florinda Costello	Alternative titles: Phobia and Massacre Mansion
1984	Tales of the Unexpected (Episode: "Sauce for the Goose")	Olivia	

== Awards and nominations ==
Year	Organization	Category	Work	Result	Ref.
1948	Academy Awards	Best Supporting Actress	Crossfire	Nominated	
1953	Academy Awards	Best Supporting Actress	The Bad and the Beautiful	Won	
1953	Golden Globe Awards	Best Supporting Actress – Motion Picture	The Bad and the Beautiful	Nominated	
1960	Hollywood Walk of Fame	Star - Motion Pictures	—N/a	Honored	

== Footnotes ==
=== Sources ===
- Curcio, Vincent (1989). Suicide Blonde: The Life of Gloria Grahame (1st ed.). William Morrow. ISBN 978-0-6880-6718-2.
- Lentz, Robert J. (2011). Gloria Grahame, Bad Girl of Film Noir: The Complete Career. McFarland & Co. ISBN 978-0-786-43483-1.
