= Thieves Like Us (novel) =

1937 novel by Edward Anderson

First edition

Thieves Like Us is the second and last published novel written by Edward Anderson (author)(1905–1969). It was published in 1937 by Frederick A. Stokes.

== Reviews ==
In a 1974 review of a paperback reissue, The New York Times wrote that "nothing in the book has been diminished by time, including the sentiment of a bank robber named T-Dub Masefeld that bankers are 'thieves just like us.'" See: Crime Novels: American Noir of the 1930s and 40s by Robert Polito (editor), The Library of America (1997).

== TV and theater adaptations ==
Anderson sold the movie rights for $500. The first film version, a black-and-white production by RKO Radio Pictures, was called They Live by Night. It had a delayed premiere in 1950. Directed by Nicholas Ray (his first major directorial effort) and starring Farley Granger and Cathy O'Donnell, it is a classic noir crime film.

A second film version was later made by Robert Altman in 1974 and released by United Artists studios under the same title as the book, Thieves Like Us.

In September 2010, The House Theatre of Chicago produced an original live theater adaptation of the script. The production, at Chopin Theatre, ran for four weeks.
