= Nicholas Ray =

American film director (1911–1979)

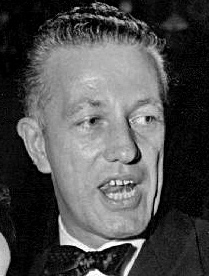
- Ray in 1953
- Born: Raymond Nicholas Kienzle Jr. August 7, 1911; Galesville, Wisconsin, U.S.
- Died: June 16, 1979 (aged 67); New York City, U.S.
- Occupations: Film director; screenwriter; actor
- Years active: 1946–1979
- Spouses: Jean (Abrams) Evans (m. 1936; div. 1942) Gloria Grahame (m. 1948; div. 1952) Betty Utey (m. 1958; div. 1970) Susan Schwartz (m. 1971)
- Children: 4, including Anthony Ray
- Relatives: Gloria Grahame (daughter-in-law, 1960–1974)

Nicholas Ray (born Raymond Nicholas Kienzle Jr., August 7, 1911 – June 16, 1979) was an American film director, screenwriter, and actor. Considered one of postwar American's most gifted, and ultimately, tragic filmmakers, he often clashed with the Hollywood studio system of the 1940s and 1950s, but would ultimately, influence future generations of filmmakers.

His best known work is Rebel Without a Cause (1955), starring James Dean, in his final role. He also directed They Live By Night (1948), In a Lonely Place (1950), Johnny Guitar (1954), Bigger Than Life (1956), and King of Kings (1961). Throughout the 1970s, he produced the experimental We Can't Go Home Again (1973), which was unfinished at the time of his death.

During his lifetime, Ray was nominated for the Academy Award for Best Story for Rebel Without a Cause, twice for the Golden Lion, for Bigger Than Life (1956) and Bitter Victory (1957), and a Palme d'Or for The Savage Innocents (1960). Three of his films were ranked by Cahiers du Cinéma in their Annual Top 10 Lists.

Ray's compositions within the CinemaScope frame and use of color are particularly well regarded and he was an important influence on the French New Wave, with Jean-Luc Godard famously writing, "... there is cinema. And the cinema is Nicholas Ray."

== Early life and career ==
Ray was born in Galesville, Wisconsin, the youngest of four children and only son of Olene "Lena" (Toppen) and Raymond Nicholas Kienzle, a contractor and builder. He grew up in La Crosse, Wisconsin. A popular but erratic student prone to delinquency and alcohol abuse, with his alcoholic father as an example, at age sixteen Ray was sent to live with his older, married sister in Chicago, Illinois, where he attended Waller High School. Upon his return to La Crosse in his senior year, he emerged as a talented orator, winning a contest at local radio station WKBH (now WIZM) while also hanging around a local stock theater.

With strong grades in English and public speaking alongside failures in Latin, physics, and geometry, he graduated at the bottom (ranked 152nd in a class of 153) of his class at La Crosse Central High School in 1929. He studied drama at La Crosse State Teachers College (now the University of Wisconsin–La Crosse) for two years before earning the requisite grades to apply for admission to the University of Chicago in the fall of 1931. Although he spent only one semester at the institution because of excessive drinking and poor grades, Ray managed to cultivate a relationship with dramatist Thornton Wilder, then a professor.

Ray returned to his hometown and started the La Crosse Little Theatre Group, which presented several productions in 1932. He also briefly re-enrolled at the State Teachers College in the fall of that year. Before his stint at Chicago, he had contributed a regular column of musings, called "The Bullshevist," to the Racquet, the college's weekly publication, and resumed writing for it when he returned, but, according to biographer Patrick McGilligan, Ray, with friend Clarence Hiskey, also arranged meetings to organize a La Crosse chapter of the Communist Party USA. By early 1933, he had left the State Teachers College and began to employ the moniker of "Nicholas Ray" in his correspondence.

Through his connections with Thornton Wilder and others in Chicago, Ray met Frank Lloyd Wright at Wright's home, Taliesin, in Spring Green, Wisconsin. He cultivated a relationship with Wright in order to win an invitation to join "the Fellowship," as the community of Wright "apprentices" was known. In late 1933 Wright asked Ray to organize the newly built Hillside Playhouse, a room at Taliesin dedicated to musical and dramatic performances. There, at regular film screenings often encompassing foreign productions, Ray likely had his first exposure to non-Hollywood cinema. However he and his mentor had a falling-out in spring 1934 with Wright directing him to leave the compound immediately.

While negotiating with Wright, Ray visited New York City, where he had his first encounters with the political theatre growing in response to the Great Depression. Ray joined the Workers' Laboratory Theatre, a communal troupe formed in 1929, which had recently changed its name to the Theatre of Action. Briefly billing himself as Nik Ray, he acted in several productions, collaborating with a number of performers, some of whom he later cast in his films, including Will Lee and Curt Conway, and some who became friends for life, including Elia Kazan. He was subsequently employed by the Federal Theatre Project, part of the Works Progress Administration. He befriended folklorist Alan Lomax and traveled with him through rural America, collecting traditional vernacular music. In 1940–41, Lomax produced and Ray directed Back Where I Come From, a pioneering folk music radio program featuring such artists as Woody Guthrie, Burl Ives, Lead Belly, the Golden Gate Quartet, and Pete Seeger, for CBS. American folk songs would later figure prominently in several of his films.

During the early years of World War II, Ray directed and supervised radio propaganda programs for the United States Office of War Information and the Voice of America broadcasting service under the aegis of John Houseman. In the summer of 1942 Ray was investigated by the FBI, and was given its B-2 classification of "tentative dangerousness." Additionally, Director J. Edgar Hoover personally recommended "Custodial Detention." Though Hoover's scheme was later quashed by the Justice Department, in autumn 1943 Ray was among more than twenty OWI employees identified publicly as having Communist affiliations or sympathies, noting that he was "discharged from the WPA community service of Washington DC for Communist activities." The FBI soon determined the case of "Nicholas K. Ray," however, "as not warranting investigation." At the OWI, Ray renewed his acquaintance with Molly Day Thatcher, Houseman's assistant, and her husband, Elia Kazan, from the New York theatre days. In 1944, heading to Hollywood to direct A Tree Grows in Brooklyn, Kazan suggested Ray go west, too, and hired him as an assistant on the production.

Ray directed his first and only Broadway production, the Duke Ellington-John Latouche musical Beggar's Holiday, in 1946. Earlier that year he was assistant director, under director Houseman, of another Broadway musical, Lute Song, with music by Raymond Scott. Also through Houseman, Ray had the opportunity to work in television, one of his few forays into the new medium. Houseman had agreed to direct an adaption of Lucille Fletcher's radio thriller, Sorry, Wrong Number, for CBS, and took Ray on as his collaborator. They cast Mildred Natwick as the invalid woman who thinks that she's the object of a murder scheme she overhears on her phone. When Lute Song called on Houseman's time and attention, Ray took over the task of staging the broadcast, which aired on January 30, 1946. The next year, Ray directed his first film, They Live by Night (1949), for RKO Pictures.

== Hollywood ==
They Live By Night was reviewed (under one of its working titles, The Twisted Road) as early as June 1948, but not released until November 1949, due to the chaotic conditions surrounding Howard Hughes's takeover of RKO Pictures. As a result of the delay, the second and third pictures Ray directed, RKO's A Woman's Secret (1949) and Knock On Any Door (1949), a loan-out to Humphrey Bogart's Santana Productions and Columbia, were released before his first.

Almost an impressionistic take on film noir, starring Farley Granger and Cathy O'Donnell as a thief and his newlywed wife, They Live By Night was notable for its empathy for society's young outsiders, a recurring motif in Ray's oeuvre. Its subject matter, two young lovers running from the law, had an influence on the popular movie sub-genre involving a fugitive criminal couple, including Joseph H. Lewis's Gun Crazy (1950), Arthur Penn's Bonnie and Clyde (1967), Terrence Malick's Badlands (1973), and Robert Altman's 1974 adaptation of the Edward Anderson novel that had also served as the basis for Ray's film, Thieves Like Us. The New York Times gave They Live By Night a positive review, praising Ray for "good, realistic production and sharp direction."

Ray made several more contributions to the noir genre, most notably In a Lonely Place (1950), starring Humphrey Bogart as a troubled screenwriter suspected of a violent murder, and On Dangerous Ground (1951), in which Robert Ryan plays an alienated, brutally violent detective on a city police force who finds redemption, and love, after he is sent to investigate a murder in a rural community.

While at RKO, Ray also directed A Woman's Secret, co-starring his wife-to-be Gloria Grahame as a singer who becomes the subject of a crime and an investigation of her past, and Born to Be Bad (1950), with Joan Fontaine as a San Francisco social climber.

In January 1949, Ray was announced as set to direct I Married a Communist, a litmus test that RKO head Howard Hughes had concocted to weed out Communists at the studio. John Cromwell and Joseph Losey had previously turned it down, and both were punished by the studio and subsequently blacklisted. Soon after the public announcement, and prior to the start of production, Ray stepped away from the project. While the studio considered dismissing him or suspending him, instead it extended his contract, evidently with Hughes's consent. As late as 1979, Ray credited Hughes with saving him from being blacklisted, although it's also likely that Ray wrote to the House Committee on Un-American Activities about his political past or testified in private, in order to protect himself.

His final film at the studio, The Lusty Men (1952), starred Robert Mitchum as a champion bronco rider who tutors a younger man in the ways of rodeoing while becoming emotionally involved with his reckless protégé's wife. After leaving RKO, Ray signed with a new agent, MCA's Lew Wasserman, a major Hollywood force, who steered the director's career through the 1950s, with films such as Johnny Guitar (1954) and Rebel Without a Cause (1955).

After shooting another Western, Run For Cover (1955), starring James Cagney, Ray was hired to direct High Green Wall for G. E. Theater, the anthology series produced by MCA-Revue, a subsidiary of Wasserman's agency. High Green Wall was an adaptation, by Charles Jackson, of an Evelyn Waugh story, "The Man Who Liked Dickens," about an illiterate man (Thomas Gomez) who holds a stranded traveller (Joseph Cotten) captive in the jungle, forcing him to read aloud from Dickens novels. Shot on film over a few days following a week's rehearsal, the half-hour drama was broadcast on CBS on October 3, 1954. Ray never worked in broadcast television again, and rarely spoke of the program, later expressing his disappointment with it.

In 1955, at Warner Bros., Ray directed Rebel Without a Cause, twenty-four hours in the life of a troubled teenager, starring James Dean in what proved to be his final and most famous role. When Rebel was released, only a few weeks after Dean's early death in an automobile crash, it had a revolutionary impact on movie-making and youth culture, virtually giving birth to the contemporary concept of the American teenager. Looking past its social and pop-culture significance, Rebel Without a Cause is the purest example of Ray's cinematic style and vision, with an expressionistic use of color, dramatic use of architecture and an empathy for social misfits.

Rebel Without a Cause was Ray's biggest commercial success, and marked a breakthrough in the careers of young actors Natalie Wood and Sal Mineo, who, along with Dean, form the film's central triad. Ray engaged in a tempestuous "spiritual marriage" with Dean, and awakened the latent homosexuality of Mineo, through his role as Plato, who would become the first gay teenager to appear on film.

In 1956, Ray was hired to direct the melodrama Bigger Than Life (1956) at Twentieth Century-Fox by the film's star and producer, James Mason, who plays an elementary-school teacher, stricken with a rare circulatory ailment, and driven delusional by his abuse of a new wonder drug, Cortisone. In 1957, completing a two-picture deal, Ray reluctantly directed The True Story of Jesse James, a remake of the 1939 Fox release, Jesse James. Ray wanted to cast Elvis Presley as the legendary bandit, and Presley had made his first film, Love Me Tender (1956), at the studio. Fox demurred, however, and Presley moved to Paramount, leaving contract players Robert Wagner and Jeffrey Hunter to play the James brothers.

Warner's commitment to Rebel Without a Cause led the studio to send Ray on his first overseas trip, in September 1955, to publicize the film, while it was still in previews. He visited Paris, where he met some of the French critics who wrote for Cahiers du Cinema and were eager to talk with the director about Johnny Guitar. He was in London when he received a phone call informing him of James Dean's death. He then travelled to Germany, to drink and mourn.

Ray returned to Warner Bros. for Wind Across the Everglades (1958), an ecologically themed period drama about plume poachers, written by Budd Schulberg and produced by his brother, Stuart Schulberg; and, at MGM, he directed Party Girl (1958), which harked back to Ray's youth in Chicago, a Roaring Twenties gangster drama that included musical numbers performed by star Cyd Charisse.

Prior to those projects, however, Ray returned to France to direct Bitter Victory (1957), a World War II drama starring Richard Burton and Curd Jürgens as Leith and Brand, British army officers on a mission to raid a Nazi station in Benghazi, and Ruth Roman as Brand's wife and, before the war, Leith's lover. Shot on location in the Libyan desert, with some sequences in a studio in Nice, it was by all accounts an arduous production, exacerbated for Ray by his drinking and drug use. Bitter Victory confused many, while enthusing Ray's continental supporters, such as Godard and Éric Rohmer.

Though he contributed to the writing of most of his films — perhaps most extensively The Lusty Men, which started production with only a handful of pages — The Savage Innocents (1960) was the only screenplay of a film he directed for which Ray received credit. Adapting a novel about Inuit life by Hans Ruesch, Top of the World, Ray also drew on the writing of explorer Peter Freuchen, and the 1933 film based on one of Freuchen's books, Eskimo. An epic-scale production, with Italian backing and distribution by Paramount, Ray began shooting the film, with lead Anthony Quinn, in the brutal cold of northern Manitoba and on Baffin Island, but much of the footage was lost in a plane crash. He had to use process photography to replace the lost location scenes, when the production moved to Rome, as planned, for studio work.

Now largely based in Europe, Ray signed on to direct producer Samuel Bronston's life of Christ as a replacement for the original director, John Farrow. Shooting in Spain, Ray cast Jeffrey Hunter, who had played Jesse James's brother Frank for the director a few years before, as Jesus. A vast undertaking by any account, the production endured intervention by backing studio MGM, logistical challenges (the Sermon on the Mount sequence required five cameras and employed 5,400 extras), and the project grew in ways that Ray could not control. King of Kings (1961) was received with hostility by the U.S. press, particularly by the Catholic periodical America.

Screenwriter Philip Yordan, Ray's collaborator on several projects, including Johnny Guitar and King of Kings, persuaded the director to sign again with Bronston for another epic, this one about the Boxer Rebellion. With an international cast, including Charlton Heston, Ava Gardner, David Niven and most of the staff of Madrid's Chinese restaurants (as extras, not the Chinese principals), again for Ray, the project was being rewritten on the fly, and he was directing with little preparation. Due to th e pressures of the job, he was heavily medicated and slept little, and finally, he collapsed on the set, suffering a tachycardia. He was replaced by Andrew Marton, a second-unit director fresh off another runaway spectacle, Cleopatra (1963) Released from hospital, Ray tried to participate in the editing process, but Bronston forbade him from viewing any of the footage after Ray responded negatively to the bit that he saw. Ray was credited as director, and represented the film, his last mainstream motion picture, at its May 1963 premiere in London.

== Later career ==
Ray found himself increasingly shut out of the Hollywood film industry in the early 1960s, and after 55 Days at Peking, he did not direct again until the 1970s, though he continued to try to develop projects while in Europe.

He attempted an adaptation of Ibsen's The Lady From the Sea, first with Ingrid Bergman in mind, and later Romy Schneider. He optioned a novel, Next Stop—Paradise, by the Polish writer Marek Hlasko. In late 1963, in Paris, he worked with novelist James Jones on a Western titled Under Western Skies, drawing on Hamlet.

In London, hoping to treat his alcohol and drug abuse, he consulted the physician and psychiatrist, Barrington Cooper, who prescribed script work as "occupational therapy." Ray and Cooper formed a production company, Emerald Films, under which they developed two projects that were among the few in Ray's European sojourn to come anywhere near fruition. The Doctor and the Devils was a screenplay written by Dylan Thomas (whom Cooper had also treated), inspired by the 1828 case of Dr. Robert Knox and murderers Burke and Hare, who supplied him with corpses for dissection, to be used during medical lessons. Ray struck up a deal with Avala Film, the largest production company in Yugoslavia, to back that film and three others, leading him from London to Zagreb. Production was announced as starting on September 1, 1965, amended to October 21, with Maximilian Schell, Susannah York and Geraldine Chaplin in the cast, but Ray insisted on rewrites, asking, among others, John Fowles, who declined, and Gore Vidal, who in retrospect wondered why he agreed. Ray tried in vain to enlist U.S. investment, by Seven Arts and Warner Bros., on a budget that was mounting, to upwards of $2.5 million. Accounts of the productions failure vary, including the assertion that on the first day of shooting, Ray was out of the country, and the conclusion that he was paralyzed by doubt and indecision. Whatever the case, prospects for a new, major Nicholas Ray film dissolved.

The second property that Ray tried to develop through Emerald Films was Dave Wallis's novel, Only Lovers Left Alive. The dystopian parable, in which adults have abandoned society and adolescents have formed gangs to take charge, was announced in spring 1966, and was supposed to star the Rolling Stones, but it never took off. Cooper later said that the Stones' U.S. manager Allen Klein had "conned" Ray into giving up his rights to the property, with a "lucrative director's contract," but nothing to direct. (Jim Jarmusch, who befriended Ray a few years before his death, later made a film titled Only Lovers Left Alive (2013), which has no connection to Ray's project of the same name.)

Ray made the German island Sylt his base of operations and imagined projects that might shoot there, including one to star Jane Fonda and Paul Newman, titled Go Where You Want, Die As You Must, a production that would also demand 2,000 extras. While in Europe, he attracted some of the current generation of filmmakers. He had been introduced to Volker Schlöndorff by Hanne Axmann, who had starred in Schlöndorff's first film, and Ray brokered a deal to sell his second, Mord und Totschlag (1969), to Universal Pictures, pocketing about one-third of the money as his fee and for expenses. When in Paris, he sometimes stayed with Barbet Schroeder, whose production company tried to find backing for one or another of Ray's projects. There, in the wake of the May 1968 demonstrations, he collaborated with Jean-Pierre Bastid and producer Henry Lange to shoot a three-part, one-hour film, which he later titled Wha-a-at?, one of several projects, concerning contemporary young people during a time of questioning, rebellion and revolt that never came to be. Similarly, Ray enticed Schroeder's friend Stéphane Tchalgadjieff to raise funding for L'Evadé (The Substitute), a story about mixed and assumed identities, and Tchalgadjieff raised a half-million dollars, only for Ray to manoeuvre him out, and for nothing to emerge from the enterprise.

Ray's reputation for youth-oriented films led Ellen Ray (unrelated to him) and her partners in Dome Films to hire him to direct The Defendant, her screenplay about a young man on trial for possession of marijuana, prompting Ray's return to the United States in November 1969. Instead, Ray embarked on projects concerning young Americans in turbulent times, notably the Chicago Seven, forming a production company called Leo Seven, and drawing some financial interest from Michael Butler, producer of the hit stage musical Hair. Shooting material for Conspiracy on almost every current gauge of film stock, from 35mm to Super 8, he accumulated documentary sequences, dramatized reconstructions of the trial, and collage-like multiple-image footage. In order to continue, he financed production by selling paintings that he owned, and sought backing from anyone he could.

In 1971, Ray started a new career as a teacher, accepting an appointment at Harpur College, in Binghamton, NY. There he found a cast and crew in the form of his eager students. Ray and his class embarked on a major, feature-length project. Rather than the strict division of labor characteristic of his Hollywood career, Ray devised a rotation in which a student would take on different roles behind or in front of the camera. Similar to the Chicago Seven project — some footage from which he incorporated into the new film — the Harpur film, which came to be titled We Can't Go Home Again, used material shot on numerous gauges of film, as well as video that was later processed and manipulated with a synthesizer provided by Nam June Paik. The pictures were combined into multiple-image constructions using as many as five projectors, and refilming the images in 35mm from a screen. Two documentaries provide records of Ray's methods and the work of his class: the near-contemporary biography, I'm A Stranger Here Myself: A Portrait of Nicholas Ray (1975), directed by David Helpern Jr., and Susan Ray's retrospective account, Don't Expect Too Much (2011).

In the spring of 1972, Ray was asked to show some footage from the film at a conference. The audience was shocked to see footage of Ray and his students smoking marijuana together. An early version of We Can't Go Home Again was shown at the Cannes Film Festival in 1973, to an abiding lack of interest. Ray shot additional scenes in Amsterdam, shortly after the Cannes screening, in New York in January 1974, and two months later in San Francisco, and edited a second version, with the hopes of attracting a distributor in 1976. It remained uncompleted and without distribution at Ray's death, in 1979, but some prints of the 1973 version were made and screened at festivals and retrospectives through the 1980s. A restored version, based on the 1973 cut, was released on DVD and Blu-ray in 2011, by Oscilloscope Films.

In the spring of 1973, Ray's contract at Binghamton was not renewed and he relocated several times before returning to New York City. There, he continued to prepare script materials and try to develop film projects, the most viable of which was City Blues, before the production collapsed. He was also able to continue teaching acting and directing, at the Lee Strasberg Institute and New York University, where his teaching assistant was graduate student Jim Jarmusch.

Ray directed two short films in the 1970s. One, The Janitor, was a segment of the feature-length Wet Dreams, also known as Dreams of Thirteen (1974). Within a collection of shorts, most of which satirized pornography, Ray's was also a very personal film in which he cast himself in the double role of a caretaker and a preacher, and used visual techniques comparable to those in his previous film. The second, Marco (1978), derived from one of his Strasberg Institute classes and was based on the first few pages of a recent novel of the same name, by Curtis Bill Pepper. Ray's film was included in the 2011 DVD/Blu-ray release of We Can't Go Home Again.

Dying of lung cancer, Ray, along with his son Tim, conceived a documentary about a father-son relationship. That idea, and Ray's hunger to continue working, led to the involvement of German filmmaker Wim Wenders, who had previously employed Ray as an actor, in a small but notable role in The American Friend (1977). Their collaboration, Lightning Over Water (1980), "a fictionalized account of Ray's own last days", also known as Nick's Film, uses documentary footage and dramatic constructions, juxtaposing film and video. It charts their passage in making a film, as well as recording events of Ray's last months, including directing a stage scene with actor Gerry Bamman, and directing and acting a scene with Ronee Blakley (then married to Wenders), inspired by King Lear. The film was completed after Ray's death, in June 1979.

== Directing techniques ==
Ray's direct orial style and preoccupations have led critics to consider him an auteur. He is considered a central figure in the development of auteur theory itself. He was often singled out by Cahiers du cinéma critics, who coined the term to designate exemplars (alongside such major figures as Alfred Hitchcock and Howard Hawks) of film directors who worked in Hollywood, and whose work had a recognizable and distinctive stamp seen to transcend the standardized industrial system in which they were produced.

=== Acting ===
Like many U.S. theater practitioners of the 1930s, Ray was strongly influenced by the theories and practices of early-twentieth century Russian dramatists, and the system of actor training that evolved into "Method acting." Late in life, he told students, "My first orientation to the theatre was more toward Meyerholdt, then Vakhtangov, than Stanislavsky," citing Vakhtangov's notion of "agitation from the essence" as being "a principal guideline for me in my directing career." On Born To Be Bad, Ray started rehearsals with a table read, then customary in a stage production but less so for a film, and star Joan Fontaine found the exercise discomfiting, tainting her relationship with the director. On the same film, Joan Leslie appreciated Ray's hands-on direction, even though they differed in their interpretation of a scene.

=== Themes and stories ===
Most of Ray's films take place in the United States, and biographer Bernard Eisenschitz stresses the distinctively American themes that run through his motion pictures, and Ray's life. His early work alongside Alan Lomax, as a WPA folklorist and then in radio, and his acquaintance with musicians including Woody Guthrie, Lead Belly, Pete Seeger and Josh White, informed his approach to American society in his films, and the interest in ethnography evident in his films. Ray frequently made films characterized by their examination of outsider figures, and most of his movies implicitly or explicitly critique conformity. With examples including They Live By Night and Rebel Without a Cause, he has been cited for his sympathetic treatment of contemporary youth, but other films of his adeptly deal with the crises of more experienced and older characters, among them In A Lonely Place, The Lusty Men, Johnny Guitar and Bigger Than Life. His work has been singled out for the unique way in which it "define[s] the peculiar anxieties and contradictions of America in the '50s."

=== Visual style ===
While he started working in Hollywood on film noir and other black-and-white pictures, in the standard Academy ratio, Ray later became better known for his vivid use of color and widescreen. His films have also been noted for their stylized mise en scène with carefully choreographed blocking and composition that often emphasizes architecture. Ray himself credited his affection for widescreen formats to Frank Lloyd Wright: "I like the horizontal line, and the horizontal was essential for Wright." As V. F. Perkins observes, however, many of Ray's compositions "are deliberately, sometimes startlingly, unbalanced to give an effect of displacement," further noting his use of "static masses with bold lines ... which intrude into the frame and at the same time disrupt and unify his compositions."

=== Genre ===
Ray distinguished himself by working in nearly every Hollywood genre, infusing them with distinctive stylistic and thematic approaches: Crime films, within the film noir cycle: They Live By Night, In A Lonely Place, and On Dangerous Ground; the social problem film Knock On Any Door; Westerns: Run For Cover, Johnny Guitar, and The True Story of Jesse James; Women's pictures: A Woman's Secret and Born To Be Bad; World War II dramas: Flying Leathernecks and Bitter Victory; the family melodrama: Rebel Without A Cause and Bigger Than Life: Epic spectacles: King of Kings and 55 Days at Peking. A number of his films defied genres, such as Party Girl, the gangster film, which is punctuated by dance numbers but not quite a musical, or the rodeo film The Lusty Men.

== Personal life ==
Ray was the youngest child in his family, and the only boy, called "Ray" or "Junior." His three sisters were significantly older than he: Alice, born 1900; Ruth, born 1903; and Helen, born 1905. (He had two half-sisters, from his father's first marriage. They had both married but continued to live near their father.) Raymond Sr. was a building contractor, age forty-eight when his son was born. After World War I, he retired and moved his family from the small town of Galesville to his own hometown, the larger community of La Crosse, where they would be nearer his mother. Raymond Sr. loved to read and he loved music, and so did Ray, who remembered hearing Louis Armstrong and Lil Hardin, playing on the banks of the Mississippi River, around 1920. Mother Lena was a Lutheran and teetotaler, but the father drank and frequented speakeasies. Raymond Sr. went missing in 1927; Ray tracked down his father's mistress, who led him to a hotel room where his father was insensate. Raymond Sr. died the next day. Ray was sixteen.

As the youngest, Ray had been indulged by his mother and sisters, death had left him the only male in the family. One by one his sisters left home. By 1924, Alice had completed training as a nurse, married and moved to Madison, and, by the time her father died, Oshkosh. Middle sister Ruth had taken Ray to his first movie, The Birth of a Nation (1915), and she was the first in the family with theatrical ambitions — "stagestruck," as he later characterized her — but they were foiled by the family. She moved to Chicago and married a scientist, but indulged her love of the arts as an avid audience member. Helen too had performance in her veins, working awhile reading stories on a children's radio broadcast, then becoming a teacher.

Increasingly unmanageable after his father's death, Ray was sent to Chicago to live with his sister Ruth and enroll in Robert A. Waller High, returning to La Crosse Central midway through his final year. He was popular, with a good sense of humor about himself. He played football and basketball, and was involved in the "Falstaff Club," the school's drama group, though not as an onstage presence. His mellifluous, deep voice earned him a scholarship to be an announcer at the local radio station, WKBH, for a year, while he was enrolled in La Crosse Teachers College.

As in high school, he joined the drama society, the Buskin Club, where he dated Kathryn Snodgrass, daughter of the school's president. They also collaborated as editors on the Racquet, the school newspaper, she on features, and he on sports, and as co-writers of a stage revue revolving around a college student who goes to Hollywood. The couple was known around campus as "Ray and Kay." In April 1930, he played the lead in the school's major production, of The New Poor, a 1924 comedy by Cosmo Hamilton.

After improving his academic record, in fall 1931, Ray transferred to the University of Chicago to study with Thornton Wilder, who had already impressed Ray when he had seen the writer in La Crosse. Ray was pledged to a fraternity and played some football, but by his own account, he was more committed to drinking and pursuing college girls. Ray spent only one quarter at the University of Chicago, and returned to La Crosse in December, resuming enrollment at Teachers College in autumn 1932. That same year, he and his friend Clarence Hiskey agitated to start a chapter of the U.S. Communist Party.

At the end of 1932, Ray left college, and, now calling himself Nicholas Ray, sought new opportunities. Through Thornton Wilder, Ray met Frank Lloyd Wright, with the hope of joining Wright's Fellowship at Taliesin. Lacking the tuition fee, in 1933, Ray moved to New York City, and, staying in Greenwich Village, he had his first encounters with the city's bohemia. There, shortly before his stint at Taliesin, Ray met young writer Jean Evans (born Jean Abrahams, later Abrams), and they started a relationship. They married in 1936. When Ray took a position at the WPA in Washington, by January 1937 they had moved to Arlington, Virginia. They had one son, Anthony Nicholas (born November 24, 1937), known as Tony, and named for Ray's friend and fellow Federal Theatre director Anthony Mann. Washington government life wore on both Ray and Evans, and Ray's drinking and infidelity strained their marriage. Evans moved back to New York in 1940, having found a job at PM, the new leftist newspaper. Ray returned to New York in May of that year, but the couple soon separated. A few months later he again attempted to reconcile, while also living at Almanac House, a Greenwich Village loft occupied by Pete Seeger, Lee Hays, and Millard Lampell, core members of the Almanac Singers. Evans filed for divorce in December 1941, and the process was finalized the next summer.

Ray had been rejected for military service on medical grounds but worked for the Office of War Information (OWI), under John Houseman. There, Ray met Connie Ernst, the daughter of lawyer Morris L. Ernst, and a producer of The Voice of America. After his divorce, she and Ray lived together, in New York, from 1942 to 1944, when the OWI sent her to London prior to D-Day, and after she had begun seeing another staff member, Michael Bessie, whom she later married. Ray later wrote, "We had once wanted to marry," though she had remembered his drinking and gambling, commenting, "It was very tricky, being with Nick."

Relocating to Los Angeles to work with Elia Kazan, Ray first lived in a flat at the Villa Primavera, on the corner of Harper and Fountain, that became the model for the apartment building in In A Lonely Place, before moving into a house in Santa Monica. While at Fox, he socialized with fellow transplanted east coasters and theatre folk at Gene Kelly and Betsy Blair's house, among them Judith Tuvim, soon to be known as Judy Holliday, whom he had briefly, unsuccessfully pursued in New York, after his marriage ended. On one occasion, fueled by alcohol, they waded into Santa Monica Bay, an excursion that turned into a halfhearted double suicide attempt, before they changed their minds and struggled back to dry land.

While directing A Woman's Secret, he became involved with the film's co-star, Gloria Grahame, later remembering, "I was infatuated with her but I didn't like her very much." Nonetheless, they married in Las Vegas on June 1, 1948, just five hours after her divorce from her first husband was granted, and five months before the birth of their son, Timothy, on November 12. (RKO announced that he was born "almost four months before the date he was expected.") Tensions in their marriage were known early on, and by autumn 1949, while shooting In A Lonely Place, they had separated for the first time, keeping the split a secret from studio executives. In 1950, Ray and Grahame were reported to have reconciled, and were living in Malibu, though their marriage remained dysfunctional. Ray stated that he had discovered Grahame in bed with his son, Tony, who was 13 years old at the time. Although they were irreparably estranged, Ray and Grahame were nominally connected again, when he was called on to help rescue Macao (1952), a project Josef von Sternberg was directing for RKO. Grahame filed for divorce, and she testified in court that Ray had struck her twice, once at a party and once in private, at home, before the divorce was granted, on August 15, 1952. Gloria Grahame and Tony Ray married in 1960 and divorced in 1974. Tony Ray died June 29, 2018, age 80.

The HUAC investigations of Hollywood and the entertainment industry, which largely coincided with Ray's marriage to and divorce from Gloria Grahame, further weighed on him. Fellow RKO employees, such as Edward Dmytryk and Adrian Scott, were among the Hollywood 10, who had been cited for contempt of Congress in the aftermath of the 1947 hearings; Knock On Any Door and In A Lonely Place star Bogart was a charter member of the Committee for the First Amendment, which protested against the hearings; and Ray's old friend Elia Kazan testified confidentially in 1952, first refusing to name names, and later doing so, in order to protect his career. The date and content of Ray's own communication with the committee are unknown (McGilligan reports a gap in Ray's Freedom of Information files, between 1948 and 1963), but his ex-wife Jean Evans said that he later admitted to testifying against her.

By court order in the divorce, Ray started seeing psychoanalyst Carel Van der Heide. Even so, he continued womanizing and drinking, both prodigiously. He had romances with both Shelley Winters and Marilyn Monroe, who were roommates at the time, as well as Joan Crawford — with whom he was planning a suspense film, Lisbon, in 1952, and who later starred in Johnny Guitar — and Zsa Zsa Gabor. More lasting was his relationship with German Hanne Axmann (also known as Hanna Axmann, and later Hanna Axmann-Rezzori), an aspiring actress. She left her troubled marriage to actor Edward Tierney to live with Ray, but it was short-lived. While he was preparing Johnny Guitar (which featured her brother-in-law, Scott Brady), Ray asked her to return to Germany, and said he would join her there. He did not make good on that promise, though they remained in touch and friends for years thereafter.

Johnny Guitar was placed reasonably well on Variety's list of "1954 Boxoffice Champs," increasing his professional capital. By now, he had moved into Bungalow 2 at the Chateau Marmont, his headquarters while shooting Rebel Without A Cause, a project of particular importance to him, about troubled young people. That was where he pitched his need to make such a film to Lew Wasserman, prompting his agent to send him to Warner Bros. The hotel residence also became Ray's headquarters and rehearsal space, and it was where James Dean arrived, aiming to meet the director. Dean started to attend Ray's "Sunday afternoons," his regular gatherings of friends at the bungalow, where scenes of the film to come were starting to take shape. Natalie Wood remembered Ray's relationship with Dean as "fatherly," and attributed the same quality to Sal Mineo's and her own connection to their director, even though the sixteen year-old also was sexually attracted to him, and his bungalow became the site of their assignations, while she was also involved with supporting player Dennis Hopper. Ray himself was also busy with roommates Monroe and Winters, Geneviève Aumont (then the professional name of Michèle Montau), and even Lew Wasserman's wife, Edie, while also interested in Jayne Mansfield, whom he tested for the role Wood won in Rebel.

Ray and Wood continued their affair for several months after production wrapped, and while he was shooting his next project, Hot Blood (1956), a pregnancy scare, which turned out to be false, prompted her to break off the romance. Dean had had apprehensions about Ray, but their trust, partnership and friendship grew, and they talked about forming a production company, collaborating again, and, after Rebel Without A Cause opened, sharing a Nicaragua holiday. None of those plans materialized, with Dean's death in a car crash, on September 30, 1955, that left Ray devastated and bereft. On a European tour at the time, he sought comfort with Hanne Axmann, and again in alcohol, in Germany. According to one friend, Ray had been more moderate for some time, and especially during the summer when he was working on Rebel, but, realizing that the filmmaker was drinking as he was, concluded; "I think it was all over on that September night of 1955."

Some biographers posit that Ray was bisexual, but Ray denied this in 1977, saying: "I am not bisexual, but anyone who denies having had a fantasy or a daydream denies having eaten a bowl of potatoes, mashed potatoes, you know, it has the same reality." Returning to Europe, in London, Ray met Gavin Lambert, with whom he had corresponded since Lambert's pioneering positive review of They Live By Night. Talking about In A Lonely Place, Lambert remembered Ray's comments about Dix Steele, Bogart's character, at the film's end: "Will he become a hopeless drunk, or kill himself, or seek psychiatric help? Those have always been my personal options, by the way." After a night of vodka and conversation, at 3:30 am, Ray and Lambert, who was gay, had sex, and Ray cautioned "that he wasn't really homosexual, not really even bisexual," advising that he had slept with many women, "but only two or three men." The next day, Ray urged Lambert to accompany him to Hollywood to work on what became Bigger Than Life, and Lambert remained a sometimes-sexual partner, while Ray continued to pursue women. According to Lambert, Ray "behaved like a possessive lover, expecting me to be always here on call..." while Ray continued to dwell on the loss of James Dean.

Bigger Than Life tells the story of a man who grows reliant on his abuse of medication, and consequently more and more broken. The connections to Ray, who had grown increasingly dependent on both alcohol and drugs, were not lost, even on Ray. In 1976, Ray confessed to himself, in a private journal entry, that he had lived in a "continuous blackout between 1957 or earlier until now," and his wife Susan, on seeing the film, commented to her husband, "This is your story before you lived it." Ray's drug use was abetted, while he was shooting Bitter Victory, by his new girlfriend, a heroin addict named Manon, and his gambling losses led to the end of his relationship with Lambert.

Seventeen-year-old Betty Utey first crossed paths with Ray in 1951, at RKO, when he was assigned to direct some additional scenes for Androcles and the Lion (1952), including one with a troupe of bikini-clad dancers. He described it as the "steam room of the vestal virgins." Some weeks after shooting the scene, in which he featured her, he asked her out to the ballet and dinner, and then took her to the house he was renting, having split with Gloria Grahame. At the end of their evening, like In a Lonely Place, he called a cab and sent her home. She subsequently did not hear from him for almost three years, when he called her to come to his Chateau Marmont bungalow for an assignation. He then disappeared again, until 1956, when he called again. In 1958, she won a place as one of the chorines in Party Girl, and, after shooting ended, they eloped to Maine, where Ray hoped to start his third marriage by drying out. En route, he collapsed at Boston's Logan Airport, suffering from the DTs. He recovered sufficiently to travel on to Kennebunkport, where the couple spent several weeks, before marrying on October 13, 1958. They had two daughters, both born in Rome: Julie Christina, on January 10, 1960, and Nicca, October 1, 1961. Ray's mother Lena had died in March 1959.

In early 1963, the family moved from Rome to Madrid, where Ray used money from his Samuel Bronston contract to try to develop projects, which never came to fruition. With a partner, he opened a restaurant and cocktail lounge called Nicca's, named after his younger daughter, and it became the hangout for film people working in Madrid, but also a place for Ray to sink a fortune, reportedly a quarter-million of his dollars in its first year. To manage it, he hired his nephew, Sumner Williams (whom he had cast in several pictures through the 1950s). Ray continued his chronic habits: too many drinks and pills, too little sleep. He and his wife separated in 1964, and she returned to the U.S. with their children, while he remained in Europe. They remained married until January 1, 1970, when their divorce was finalized and Betty Ray remarried.

Through the middle of the 1960s, Ray lived peripatetically, setting up in Paris, London, Zagreb, Munich and, for a while, Sylt, a German island in the North Sea. He had reacquainted himself with younger son Tim, then at Cambridge, and enlisted him to help with an autobiography — the elder Ray would record his recollections, and the younger would transcribe — for which a publisher had provided an advance, though no such memoir appeared in Nick Ray's lifetime. He periodically stopped drinking and regularly asked friends for handouts. Retrospectives of his films were marking the growth in his reputation, especially outside the U.S., including a double bill of Johnny Guitar and They Live By Night in Paris, in May 1968, placing Ray and his son amid the political uprising.

He returned to the United States on November 14, 1969, landing in Washington, DC just in time for the second Moratorium to End the War in Vietnam. Soon after, he announced plans for a documentary about "the young rebels of the 1960s," and relocated to Chicago, to shoot as the trial of the Chicago Eight, soon to become the Chicago Seven, proceeded. He filmed a party for the defendants and their team the evening of December 3, the day the prosecution ended its case. Overnight, the Chicago police killed Fred Hampton, Illinois chair of the Black Panther Party, in his sleep, and Ray and his crew were on the scene early in the morning to film the aftermath.

The project had mutated from a documentary to a strange dramatic reconstruction, for which Ray considered casting Dustin Hoffman or Groucho Marx or the long-retired James Cagney, as the trial judge, Julius Hoffman. According to Ray's own account, in late January 1970, not untypically, Ray was working through the night, and he fell asleep at the editing table, waking to feel a "heavy" sensation in his right eye. "It took me six hours to find a doctor, and if I had made it twenty minutes sooner, they would have been able to inject nicotinic acid and save the eye." He was hospitalized from January 28 to February 6, and according to writer Myron Meisel, that was Ray's first treatment for cancer. Despite this explanation, Ray remained somewhat elusive about the exact cause, and McGilligan notes several possible sources and witnesses to Ray's diminished vision, including a special-effects blast fifteen years previous, while shooting Run For Cover (1955). After 1970, however, Ray started regularly wearing a key prop in the construction of his mystique. He was tall, craggy, with a leonine mane of white hair, and now a black patch over his right eye, looking, in the remembrances of his student Charles Bornstein, "like a cross between Noah, a pirate, and God!"

During the trial, Chicago Seven lawyer William Kunstler introduced Ray to Susan Schwartz, an eighteen-year-old newly arrived to study at the University of Chicago, who skipped classes to watch the courtroom theatrics. In February 1970, as the jury deliberated, she found herself in a taxi, on the way to join the hive of activity that surrounded Ray at his house. "After only one day on Orchard Street," she later wrote, "the decision was easy: at the end of the term I would quit school and join the adventure, whatever it was."

They relocated to New York City, where Schwartz worked, in real estate and then publishing, to make a living for both of them while Ray sought money to continue work on the film and start other projects. They stayed with Ray's old cronies, including Alan Lomax and Connie Bessie, before finding a place of their own, while Ray continued to indulge his addictions and at night haunt the seamier corners of Times Square. When they crossed paths at a Grateful Dead show at the Fillmore East, Dennis Hopper invited Ray to his house in Taos, New Mexico, where Hopper was editing The Last Movie (1971). There Ray again found chaos of creativity and debauchery, of a type he had come to thrive upon, at least until the costs of hosting Nicholas Ray — Nicca Ray heard her father ran up a phone bill of $2,500, while Hopper himself likely exaggerated it as $30,000 a month — caused Hopper to ask him to leave. In Taos, Ray asked Susan to marry him, giving her his ring, and in return she gave him a pearl.

While in New Mexico, in spring 1971, Ray was invited to speak at Harpur College, an academic unit of the State University of New York at Binghamton. The event he presented convinced Larry Gottheim and Ken Jacobs that Ray should join them on faculty in the Cinema Department, then one of the U.S. epicenters of experimental film. Appointed on a two-year contract in the fall of 1972, Ray initially lived in an apartment in the university's infirmary.

Jacobs and Gottheim worked within the largely non-narrative and to varying degrees poetic and formalist realm of experimental film, while Ray's background was in drama and mainstream narrative cinema. Nonetheless, the project upon which he embarked with his students, envisioned as a feature-length film, first called Gun Under My Pillow (alluding to the character Plato, in Rebel Without A Cause) and finally titled We Can't Go Home Again, might have been seen as consistent with the avant-garde approaches to filmmaking that the department represented. There were criticisms of Ray, including the monopolization and abuse of the department's filmmaking equipment by his project, as well as his drug and alcohol habits and his students' emulation of him. As department chair, Gottheim had mediated the friction between his colleagues, but in spring 1973 Jacobs became acting chair, escalating the conflict; shortly thereafter, Ray's contract was not renewed. Jacobs would later characterize hiring Ray as a "calamitous error."

Ray's goal was to work on We Can't Go Home Again, in order to screen it at the Cannes Film Festival, in May 1973. Leaving Binghamton, followed by a few students who drove the film's elements across country in a driveaway car, he travelled wherever he might find cheap or free editing facilities, money to continue the project, and friends who would tolerate him as a guest. He started in Los Angeles, where he wound up back in Bungalow 2 at the Chateau Marmont, running up bills and seeking investment from his old Hollywood connections. But it was Susan who managed to find the money to get them both, and the film, to France. Ray's reputation in Europe might have helped secure a screening slot at Cannes, but it failed to convince the press and any other festivalgoers that the film warranted notice.

At loose ends, Ray and Susan spent some time in Paris, borrowing money from his longtime champion François Truffaut and racking up hotel costs paid by writer Françoise Sagan. Susan returned to New York, and Ray stayed awhile on a boat owned by Sterling Hayden, his "Johnny Guitar," from almost twenty years before. Ray travelled to Amsterdam, shooting a segment, The Janitor, for the feature-length Wet Dreams (1974), a softcore anthology produced by Max Fischer. He returned to New York by the end of the year, but in March 1974 he went back west, to the San Francisco Bay Area. The purpose was a retrospective of his films at the Pacific Film Archive, but he came with boxes of footage and personal goods, intending to stay awhile. He lived in a spare room at archive curator Tom Luddy's residence and worked overnight shifts in the editing rooms of Francis Coppola's Zoetrope facility, and, after he wore out that welcome, at the film collective CIne Manifest. While in the area, Ray was taken to hospital twice, once for alcoholic hemorrhaging.

Later in 1974, Ray returned to Southern California, to stay with his ex-wife Betty and their daughters, Julie, now fourteen, and Nicca, almost thirteen, whom he had not seen since they left Spain, ten years previous. Betty arranged for a house where he could stop drinking, but soon determined that he needed medical supervision and had him admitted to the detoxification unit at Los Angeles County Hospital. Ray resumed using, however, even persuading his older daughter to buy cocaine for him. On his departure, he left a letter advising that "it is best I live apart from you and our children," for many reasons, ending, "above all others I can bring you no joy."

He was deeply saddened by Sal Mineo's passing and attended his funeral in February 1976. They reconnected when Sal and his long-term partner Courtney Burr was invited to Ray's house in 1971. And, shortly after, he returned to New York City, where he was offered the opportunity to direct a film starring Marilyn Chambers and Rip Torn, which Ray titled City Blues, but financing fell through by July 1976, and the project never materialized. He continued to drink and abuse drugs heavily, and found himself in and out of hospital, with a variety of maladies and injuries due to impairment. Finally, Susan left him, and, on professional advice, gave him the ultimatum that she would not return unless he checked in to the Smithers Alcoholism and Rehabilitation Center, and was sober for one month. Shortly after, he had himself admitted. He remained for ninety days, and was discharged early in November 1976. He started attending Alcoholics Anonymous meetings, and he and Susan moved into a Soho loft, at 167 Spring Street.

In March 1977, Wim Wenders cast him in a small but notable role, alongside Dennis Hopper, in The American Friend (1977). At the same time, with the support of old friends Elia Kazan and John Houseman, Ray started to present workshops on acting and directing at the Lee Strasberg Theatre Institute, and then at New York University. He was also approached about directing a couple of films, including The Story of Bill W., about the founder of Alcoholics Anonymous. In November 1977, however, he was diagnosed with lung cancer.

He returned west in February 1978 to play a bit part in Miloš Forman's Hair (1979). Where he had looked robust in The American Friend, he now looked gaunt and drawn. After his scenes were shot, he visited Houseman in Malibu, and he summoned Nicca, so that he could tell her that he was dying of cancer. They remained in contact, but, it was the last time they saw each other.

On April 11, 1978, Ray underwent additional surgery, at Memorial Sloan-Kettering Cancer Center, involving therapeutic implantation of radioactive particles. Then, on May 26, he had surgery again, to remove a tumor on his brain. He was frail and coughed painfully and he had lost his hair; yet he was still active, and was hired to teach another summer workshop at NYU. He was then invited by László Benedek — once Ray's contemporary, as a Hollywood director, now chair of the NYU graduate film program — to teach in the autumn. He assigned Ray a teaching assistant, soon to become a friend, Jim Jarmusch.

With the imminent prospect of his death, Ray had spoken with his son Tim about making a documentary about a father-son relationship. Though that project remained unpursued, Tim Ray, experienced in cinematography, joined the crew that assembled to make Lightning Over Water, a collaboration of Ray and Wenders, though credited collectively to all the participants. With no appetite, and increasingly unable to swallow, Ray was wasting away, and had to be admitted to hospital for intravenous feeding, restoring some weight and buying some time. Ray was visited by friends including Kazan, Connie Bessie, Alan Lomax and his first wife, Jean, as well as students from Harpur College, and his more recent students.

== Death ==
Ray died in hospital of heart failure on June 16, 1979. A memorial was held at Lincoln Center shortly after. Among the attendees were all four of his wives and all four of his children. He was survived by two sisters, Helen and Alice (Ruth had died in a fire, in 1965), and his ashes were returned to La Crosse, Wisconsin, his hometown, and interred in the same section of Oak Grove Cemetery as his parents. His grave bears no inscription.

== Influence ==
In the decades after his professional peak, and since his death, filmmakers continue to cite Ray as an influence and object of admiration.

- As a critic, Victor Erice has commented on Ray's films with great affection, also collaborating with Jos Oliver on a catalogue for a 1986 retrospective, Nicholas Ray y su tiempo. Erice was also interviewed about We Can't Go Home Again for the documentary, Don't Expect Too Much. Asked to comment on any continuities between Ray's work and his own filmmaking in 2004, however, he demurred, though he has also remarked on a connection between his film El Sur (1983), and Rebel Without a Cause.
- Jean-Luc Godard wrote in his review of Bitter Victory: "There was theatre (Griffith), poetry (Murnau), painting (Rossellini), dance (Eisenstein), music (Renoir). Henceforth there is cinema. And the cinema is Nicholas Ray." In addition, Godard's films abound in references and allusions to Ray's films. In Godard's film, Contempt (1963), the character played by Michel Piccoli claims to have written Ray's Bigger Than Life, and in La Chinoise (1967) a young Maoist defends the politics of Johnny Guitar to his anti-American colleagues. Johnny Guitar is also one of the film titles used as code names by the "Front de libération de Seine et Oise" guerillas in the concluding sequence of Weekend (1967). Referring to Ray and Samuel Fuller, Godard dedicated Made in U.S.A. (1966), "À Nick et Samuel qui m'ont élevé dans le respect de l'image et du son." ["To Nick and Samuel who taught me with respect to image and sound."] Godard had seen some of Ray's multiple-image work, Ray affirmed, before Godard's ventures into the format, with Numéro deux (1975) and Ici et ailleurs (1976).
- Director Curtis Hanson discusses In a Lonely Place in a documentary supplement included on the 2003 Columbia DVD release, and later also included on the 2016 Criterion Collection Blu-ray release. Ray's film was one of many influences on his direction of L.A. Confidential (1997).
- Jim Jarmusch, having been Ray's teaching assistant at NYU, has spoken on several occasions of the lessons he's learned from the director.
- Martin Scorsese admires Ray's work, particularly his expressionistic use of color in Johnny Guitar, Rebel Without a Cause, and Bigger Than Life (1956). He used clips from two of them in his documentary A Personal Journey with Martin Scorsese Through American Movies.
- François Truffaut wrote reviews of several Ray films for the Paris weekly Arts/Spectacles in the 1950s, some later adapted for his book, Les Films de ma vie (The Films of My Life). He asserts that They Live by Night (1949) is Ray's best movie, but gives special attention to his films Bigger Than Life and Johnny Guitar. Truffaut also appears as an interview subject in the 1975 documentary about Ray, I'm a Stranger Here Myself.
- Wim Wenders is another European admirer of Ray's and has paid homage to him in many movies. Some of his films are indebted to Ray, from the title of his science fiction film Until the End of the World (which were the last spoken words in Ray's biblical epic King of Kings) to the casting of Dennis Hopper (who appeared in Rebel Without a Cause) and the expressionistic use of color in his own film The American Friend. He gave Ray a small but key role in the film: an artist, presumed dead, who forges his own work. He also co-directed Ray's final film, the experimental documentary Lightning Over Water, and edited it after Ray's death.

== Filmography (director) ==
=== Films ===
| Year | Title | Production Co. | Cast | Notes |
|---|---|---|---|---|
| 1948 | They Live by Night | RKO Pictures | Cathy O'Donnell / Farley Granger / Howard da Silva | |
| 1949 | Knock on Any Door | Santana Productions | Humphrey Bogart / John Derek | |
| 1949 | A Woman's Secret | RKO Pictures | Maureen O'Hara / Melvyn Douglas / Gloria Grahame | |
| 1950 | In a Lonely Place | Santana Productions | Humphrey Bogart / Gloria Grahame | |
| 1950 | Born to Be Bad | RKO Pictures | Joan Fontaine / Robert Ryan | |
| 1951 | Flying Leathernecks | RKO Pictures | John Wayne / Robert Ryan | Technicolor |
| 1951 | On Dangerous Ground | RKO Pictures | Robert Ryan / Ida Lupino | Ida Lupino has been said to have directed some scenes when Ray was ill. Eisenschitz found no evidence in RKO production files, though at the time she did direct Ray in a screen test for her upcoming production, released in 1951 as Hard, Fast, and Beautiful. |
| 1952 | The Lusty Men | Wald-Krasna Productions | Robert Mitchum / Susan Hayward | Robert Parrish, who was originally assigned to the film, was called in to direct some scenes when Ray fell ill, after reacting to treatment for a foot wound. |
| 1954 | Johnny Guitar | Republic Pictures | Joan Crawford / Sterling Hayden | Trucolor |
| 1955 | Run for Cover | Pine-Thomas Productions | James Cagney / John Derek | Technicolor, VistaVision |
| 1955 | Rebel Without a Cause | Warner Bros. | James Dean / Natalie Wood / Sal Mineo | Warnercolor, CinemaScope |
| 1956 | Hot Blood | Columbia Pictures | Jane Russell / Cornel Wilde | Technicolor, CinemaScope |
| 1956 | Bigger Than Life | 20th Century Fox | James Mason / Barbara Rush | De Luxe Color, CinemaScope |
| 1957 | The True Story of Jesse James | 20th Century Fox | Robert Wagner / Hope Lange / Jeffrey Hunter | De Luxe Color, CinemaScope |
| 1957 | Amère victoire Bitter Victory | Laffont Productions, Transcontinental Films | Richard Burton / Curd Jürgens | CinemaScope |
| 1958 | Wind Across the Everglades | Schulberg Productions | Burl Ives / Christopher Plummer | Fired during filming / Technicolor |
| 1958 | Party Girl | Metro-Goldwyn-Mayer, Euterpe | Robert Taylor / Cyd Charisse | Metrocolor, CinemaScope |
| 1960 | The Savage Innocents | Gray Film-Pathé, Joseph Janni-Appia Films, Magic Film | Anthony Quinn / Peter O'Toole | Technicolor, Super-Technirama 70 |
| 1961 | King of Kings | Samuel Bronston Productions | Jeffrey Hunter / Rip Torn / Robert Ryan | Technicolor, Super-Technirama 70 |
| 1963 | 55 Days at Peking | Samuel Bronston Productions | Charlton Heston / Ava Gardner / David Niven | Dismissed from production before completion / Technicolor, Super-Technirama 70 |
| 1973 | We Can't Go Home Again | | | Experimental film; rough cut premiered in 1973, final version premiered in 2006 |
| 1974 | Wet Dreams | | | Segment "The Janitor" |
| 1978 | Marco | | | Short film |
| 1980 | Lightning Over Water | | | Part-documentary / Eastmancolor film; co-directed with Wim Wenders |

=== Other work ===
| Year | Title | Production Co. | Cast | Notes |
|---|---|---|---|---|
| 1949 | Roseanna McCoy | Samuel Goldwyn Co. | Farley Granger / Joan Evans | Irving Reis received credit even though he was replaced by Ray two months into filming |
| 1951 | The Racket | RKO Pictures | Robert Mitchum / Robert Ryan | Directed some scenes |
| 1952 | Macao | RKO Pictures | Robert Mitchum / Jane Russell / William Bendix | Took over from Josef von Sternberg after he was fired during filming |
| 1952 | Androcles and the Lion | RKO Pictures | Jean Simmons / Victor Mature | Directed an extra scene after filming that was not used |

== Filmography (actor) ==
| Year | Title | Role | Notes |
|---|---|---|---|
| 1945 | A Tree Grows in Brooklyn | Bakery Clerk | uncredited |
| 1955 | Rebel Without a Cause | Planetarium employee, seen in last shot, under end titles | uncredited |
| 1963 | 55 Days at Peking | U.S. Ambassador | uncredited |
| 1973 | We Can't Go Home Again | Nick Ray | |
| 1974 | Wet Dreams | The Janitor | segment "The Janitor" |
| 1977 | The American Friend | Derwatt | |
| 1979 | Hair | The General | |
