= Human Desire =

1954 film by Fritz Lang

- Theatrical release poster
- Directed by: Fritz Lang
- Screenplay by: Alfred Hayes
- Based on: La Bête humaine 1890 novel by Émile Zola
- Produced by: Lewis J. Rachmil
- Starring: Glenn Ford; Gloria Grahame; Broderick Crawford
- Cinematography: Burnett Guffey
- Edited by: Aaron Stell
- Music by: Daniele Amfitheatrof
- Color process: Black and white
- Production company: Columbia Pictures
- Distributed by: Columbia Pictures
- Release date: August 6, 1954 (New York City)
- Running time: 91 minutes
- Country: United States
- Language: English

Human Desire is a 1954 American film noir drama starring Glenn Ford, Gloria Grahame and Broderick Crawford directed by Fritz Lang. It is loosely based on Émile Zola's 1890 novel La Bête humaine. The story had been filmed twice before: La Bête humaine (1938), directed by Jean Renoir, and Die Bestie im Menschen, starring Ilka Grüning (1920). The Academy Film Archive preserved Human Desire in 1997.

== Plot ==
Korean War veteran Jeff Warren returns to his town and duties as a train engineer, driving streamliners hauling passenger trains for the fictional Central National railroad. Warren worked alongside Alec Simmons and was a boarder in his home before going off to war. Alec's daughter Ellen is smitten with Jeff, although he has had an affair with Vicki, who is married to Carl Buckley, a hard-drinking assistant yard supervisor.

After being fired for talking back to his boss, Carl begs Vicki to visit John Owens, an important customer of the railroad for whom her mother used to work. Vicki reluctantly agrees. Carl hopes Owens' influence could help him reclaim his job, but when Vicki is gone for hours, Carl surmises that she has been unfaithful. After an argument during which he physically attacks her, he threatens to kill her if she does not admit to an affair with Owens. Terrified, she does so. He then forces Vicki to write a letter to Owens, setting up a meeting with him later that night in his sleeping car drawing room. Owens is taking the train to Chicago while Carl and Vicki are returning home. Carl and Vicki barge into Owens' room and Carl kills him with a knife he used for whittling. Carl takes Owens' wallet and pocket watch to make the murder appear to be the result of a robbery, also taking the letter that Vicki had written. After the murder, Carl sees Jeff on the train and persuades Vicki to distract him so that Carl can pass unnoticed.

At the murder inquest, Jeff and other train passengers are called as witnesses. Jeff denies having seen anyone suspicious. Vicki and Jeff resume their relationship. She lies about the night of the murder, saying she had visited Owens' compartment for a liaison but found him dead. Jeff questions why she did not seem distressed when they met on the train. Vicki says she is frightened of Carl's temper and shows Jeff marks on her body where Carl had hit her.

Ellen sells Jeff a ticket to an upcoming dance. She hopes that Jeff will invite her but knows he is involved with Vicki. Jeff tells Vicki that he wants to marry her and that she should leave Carl. She tells Jeff the truth about Owens' murder and the letter, but Jeff remains determined to keep Vicki.

Carl has become a drunk and has again lost his job. Vicki tells Jeff that Carl is selling the house and forcing her to leave town with him. She cannot find the letter and suspects that Carl must keep it with him. She suggests that she and Jeff will have to part forever but hints that things would be easier with Carl out of the way.

Jeff, clutching a large monkey wrench, follows a drunk Carl in a railyard before a passing train blocks the view of the characters. Later, Jeff tells Vicki that he could not murder Carl and accuses her of setting him up so that he would kill Carl. She tells Jeff that she loves him and that if he loved her he would have killed for her. Jeff hands her the letter, which he has taken from Carl's pocket, and leaves.

When Vicki gets on the next train, Carl confronts her, imploring her not to leave him. He offers her the letter but she tells him that he does not have it. Carl accuses her of running away with Jeff, which she denies. She admits that she is in love with Jeff, and had asked him to kill Carl, but reveals that Jeff rejected her. Carl strangles Vicki and kills her.

Meanwhile, Jeff operates the train alongside Alec. He reflects on the dance ticket that he bought from Ellen, once again enjoying a warm relationship with her father.

== Cast ==
- Glenn Ford as Jeff Warren
- Gloria Grahame as Vicki Buckley
- Broderick Crawford as Carl Buckley
- Edgar Buchanan as Alec Simmons
- Kathleen Case as Ellen Simmons
- Diane DeLaire as Vera Simmons
- Grandon Rhodes as John
- Peggy Maley as Jean

== Production ==
This film was largely shot in the vicinity of El Reno, Oklahoma. It used the facilities of what was at the time the Rock Island Railroad (now Union Pacific), though some of the moving background shots show well known East Coast railroad locations such as the Pulaski Skyway, the Lower Trenton Bridge ("Trenton Makes — The World Takes") over the Delaware River and Harpers Ferry, West Virginia.

The production utilizes other stock railroad footage. A major number of scenes take place around CRI&P Alco FA unit No. 153 painted as the fictitious Central National; however, the interiors were filmed using a Hollywood mock-up of an EMD F-unit according to the Obscure Train Movies website.

In 2019, Human Desire was released on a Region B Blu-ray in the UK by Eureka!. In 2023, it was released on a world-wide Region A/B/C compatible Blu-ray in the US by Kino Lorber.

== Reception ==
A contemporary review in Variety wrote that Lang "... goes overboard in his effort to create mood." Bosley Crowther of The New York Times wrote at the time of the film's release, "[T]here isn't a single character in it for whom it builds up the slightest sympathy—and there isn't a great deal else in it for which you're likely to have the least regard."

In 2008, critic Dave Kehr wrote of the film, "Gloria Grahame, at her brassiest, pleads with Glenn Ford to do away with her slob of a husband, Broderick Crawford. ... A gripping melodrama, marred only by Ford's inability to register an appropriate sense of doom."

As of 2022 Rotten Tomatoes rated the film at 59% positive based on 17 reviews.
