= They Live by Night =

1948 film by Nicholas Ray

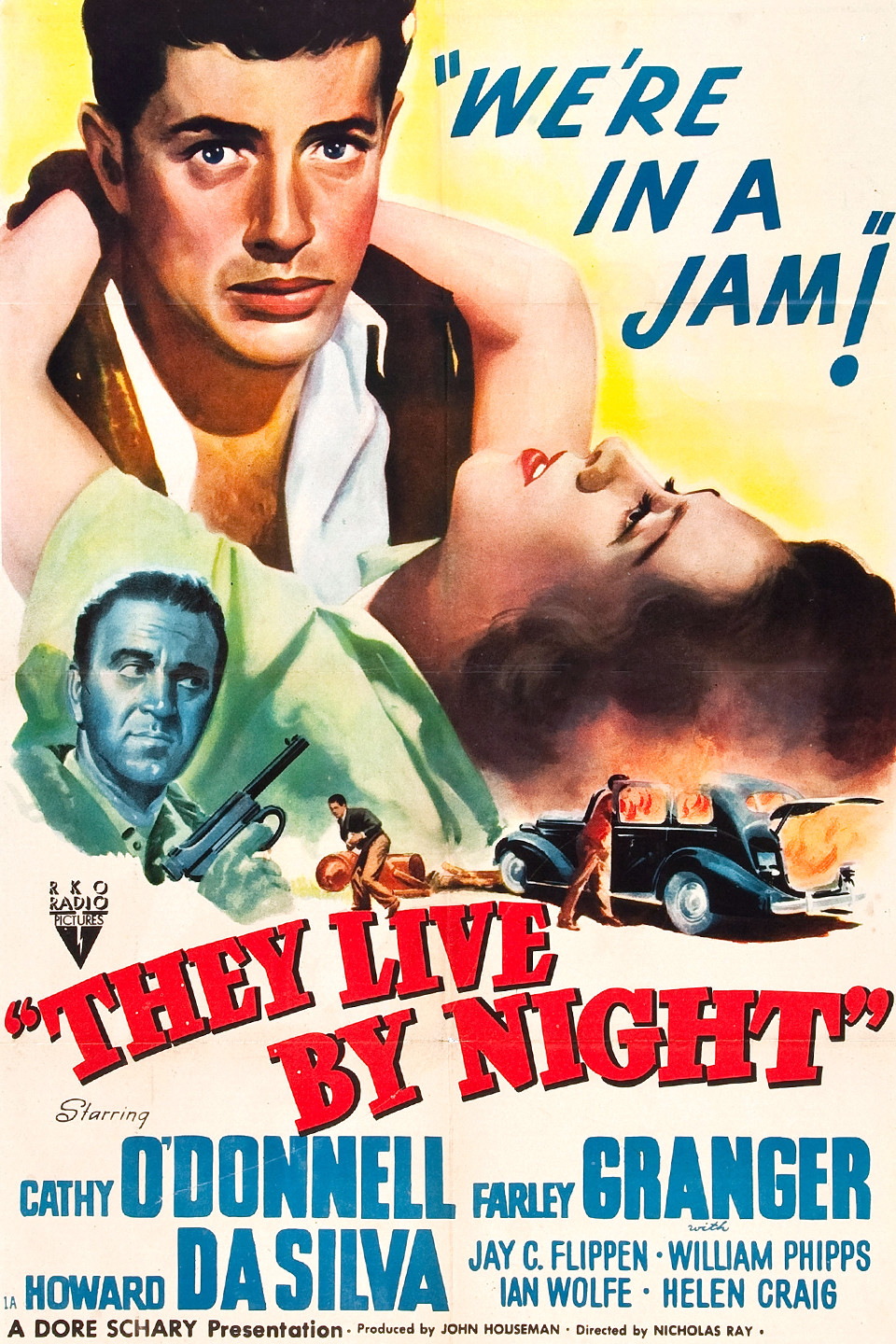
- Theatrical release poster
- Directed by: Nicholas Ray
- Screenplay by: Charles Schnee; Nicholas Ray (adaptation)
- Based on: Thieves Like Us; 1937 novel by Edward Anderson
- Produced by: John Houseman
- Starring: Farley Granger; Cathy O'Donnell; Howard Da Silva
- Cinematography: George E. Diskant
- Edited by: Sherman Todd
- Music by: Leigh Harline
- Production company: RKO Radio Pictures
- Distributed by: RKO Radio Pictures
- Release dates: August 1948 (London); November 5, 1949 (U.S.)
- Running time: 95 minutes
- Country: United States
- Language: English

They Live by Night is a 1948 American film noir notable for being the directorial debut of Nicholas Ray and starring Cathy O'Donnell and Farley Granger. Based on Edward Anderson's Depression-era novel Thieves Like Us, the film follows a young fugitive who falls in love with a woman and attempts to begin a life with her.

The film opened theatrically in London in August 1948 under the title The Twisted Road and was released in the United States by RKO Radio Pictures as They Live by Night in November 1949. Although the film received favorable reviews from film critics, it was a box-office failure, losing the studio $445,000 (equivalent to $6.02 million in 2025).

Although the film is widely considered as the prototype for the "couple on the run" genre and the forerunner to Bonnie and Clyde (1967), the story was first depicted in Fritz Lang's 1937 film You Only Live Once, starring Henry Fonda and Sylvia Sidney. Director Jim Jarmusch cites the film as one of the influences on no wave cinema and his work in general. Robert Altman directed another adaptation of the novel in 1974 using the original title of the novel, Thieves Like Us.

== Plot ==
Arthur "Bowie" Bowers, a 23-year-old serving a prison sentence for a murder he committed at the age of 16, escapes from prison with two older bank robbers, Chicamaw and T-Dub. The men take shelter with Chicamaw's brother, who operates a service station, and niece Catherine "Keechie" Mobley, who works there. Hoping to also free his incarcerated brother Robert, T-Dub concocts a plan to rob a bank and use the funds to hire a lawyer to prove a wrongful conviction.

The robbery goes smoothly. However, shortly after Bowie crashes his car, Chicamaw kills a police officer who had arrived at the scene. Chicamaw leaves an injured Bowie in the care of Keechie and joins T-Dub in another town. The sheepish Keechie swiftly grows fond of Bowie, who is also shy. They bond over their lack of experience in the world and soon develop a romance. Meanwhile, the press reports heavily on Bowie, wrongly pinning him as the ringleader of the robbery. Bowie and Keechie leave town by bus. Late one night, they find a chapel that performs quick marriages for $20. Bowie asks Keechie to marry him, and she agrees. Hawkins, the local justice of the peace, performs the ceremony and sells the couple a wedding ring and a convertible car.

Bowie and Keechie travel to a remote mountain resort where Keechie once stayed during her childhood and rent a cabin there, dreaming of living openly together. Chicamaw arrives at the resort after tracking the couple there. He has gambled away his money and wants Bowie to help him and T-Dub commit another robbery. Bowie reluctantly agrees, but Keechie, fearing that Bowie will be killed, gives him his Christmas gift early, a wristwatch. The three men commit another robbery, but T-Dub is killed. Bowie and Chicamaw flee the scene by car. While driving, Bowie learns from a drunken Chicamaw that he is jealous of all the press attention that Bowie and Keechie have received. Bowie eventually forces Chicamaw out of the car at gunpoint.

When Bowie returns to the resort, he learns that Chicamaw was killed in a liquor-store robbery. In radio broadcasts, Bowie is again described as the ringleader of the robbery. Keechie reveals that she is pregnant. The couple depart the resort and head east, traveling mainly at night to not be seen. However, they spend a leisurely time in public, visiting a park and then a nightclub. In the club, Bowie is recognized by a gangster who orders him to leave town. Bowie suggests escaping to Mexico, and Keechie agrees.

Keechie becomes very ill, and they seek refuge at a motel owned by Mattie, T-Dub's sister-in-law. Mattie reluctantly allows them to stay. Bowie visits Hawkins, seeking help to cross the border, but Mattie reluctantly strikes a deal with police to identify Bowie's location in exchange for the release of her convicted husband Robert. Hawkins tells Bowie that he is unable to help him, and Bowie returns to the motel and informs Mattie that he will leave by himself to ensure the safety of Keechie and their unborn child. Mattie is wracked with guilt over her deal with the police but urges that Bowie say a final goodbye to Keechie, hoping to delay him long enough for the police to arrive. He agrees and writes a farewell letter to bring to Keechie. As he is about to enter the cabin, police descend on the scene, provoking Bowie to draw a gun. In response, the police fire, killing Bowie. Keechie, kneeling over Bowie's dead body, reads the farewell letter.

== Cast ==
- Cathy O'Donnell as Catherine "Keechie" Mobley
- Farley Granger as Arthur "Bowie" Bowers
- Howard Da Silva as Chickamaw "One-Eye" Mobley
- Jay C. Flippen as Henry "T-Dub" Mansfield
- Helen Craig as Mattie
- Will Wright as Mobley
- William Phipps as Young Farmer
- Ian Wolfe as Hawkins
- Harry Harvey as Hagenheimer
- Marie Bryant as Singer
- Will Lee as Jeweler
- James Nolan as Schreiber
- Charles Meredith as Comm. Hubbell
- Teddy Infuhr as Alvin
- Byron Foulger as Lambert
- Guy Beach as Plumber

== Production ==
=== Development ===
The novel Thieves Like Us by Edward Anderson had been acquired by RKO in 1941 for $10,000 (equivalent to $218,900 in 2025). Numerous writers unsuccessfully tried to adapt the story as a screenplay. According to producer John Houseman, "I found the book and gave it to Nick to read, and he fell madly in love with it–as indeed I did, but Nick particularly was very familiar with that territory. He'd been there when he worked with the Lomaxes, he'd been there when he worked for the Department of Agriculture, and so on. And that whole Depression stuff was terribly his stuff. So he sat down and wrote the treatment. I'd come home at night and we'd go over it; I'd edit it a little, that's all, and it was very, very good." Houseman, who had considerable authority as a producer, repeatedly submitted treatments created by novice director Nicholas Ray.

RKO saw no commercial value in the story, especially because Ray lacked experience as a director. In early 1947, producer Dore Schary became RKO's production chief, hoping to transform it into Hollywood's most adventurous studio. Schary read Ray's treatment and signed Ray to a studio contract.

Houseman hired Charles Schnee to write the screenplay, but Houseman did not want Schnee to alter Ray's treatment. Ray and Schnee worked together to adapt the treatment into a completed script, which was submitted to RKO in May 1947.

=== Casting ===
Houseman arranged for Farley Granger to test for RKO, and Ray was convinced that he had found Bowie. Granger suggested Cathy O'Donnell for the female lead part. Both Granger and O'Donnell were under contract to Samuel Goldwyn Studios and had limited acting experience. Granger had appeared in just two films before his World War II service, while O'Donnell had just made the Best Picture-winning classic The Best Years of Our Lives (1946). Ray insisted on the casting of Granger and O'Donnell. Granger later said: "Ray and John Houseman were among the few people who fought for me in my career. They said no, we will not make the film without him. When Nick believed in you, he was very loyal." In his autobiography, Granger listed They Live by Night among his favorite films.

Many of the supporting cast and minor characters were played by friends of Houseman and Ray. RKO contract player Robert Mitchum wanted the part of Chickamaw, but as he was a rising star who had recently received an Oscar nomination, RKO deemed the role of a bank robber unfit for him. The role of Chickamaw went to Howard Da Silva, who had made an impression in Marc Blitzstein's musical The Cradle Will Rock (1937), produced by Houseman. Other minor roles were played by people whom Ray knew from the New York theater, including Marie Bryant from Beggar's Holiday as a nightclub singer, Curt Conway and Will Lee, who would later play Mr. Hooper on the famous children's television series Sesame Street.

=== Filming ===
Filming began on June 23, 1947, with the opening scene, a tracking shot of Bowie, T-Dub and Chickamaw escaping from prison in a stolen car. The action sequence was filmed from a helicopter, making They Live by Night the first major studio production to do so, predating James Wong Howe's celebrated finale helicopter shot in Picnic by eight years (1955). Four takes were required, and the second take was used in the final cut.

As Orson Welles had done in his directorial debut, Citizen Kane (1941), also made at RKO for Houseman, Ray experimented with sound and cinematography. Ray's biographer noted: "Only Welles similarly tried to define acoustic and even verbal textures as much as the visual." Renowned film editor Sherman Todd also urged Ray to experiment and defy convention. Exteriors were filmed both on location and at RKO's movie ranch in Encino, but Todd's editing blended the sequences well.

Filming completed by August 21, 1947. Despite an excellent preview, RKO was unsure about how to market the film and studio head Howard Hughes shelved it for two years before releasing it to a single theater in the UK to enthusiastic reviews. The film was finally released in the U.S. in November 1949 under the title They Live by Night rather than the source novel's title of Thieves Like Us. The title was determined by audience poll and was favored by Hughes.

== Release ==
=== Box office ===
The film recorded an ultimate loss of $445,000 (equivalent to $6.02 million in 2025).

=== Critical response ===
In a contemporary review for The New York Times, critic Bosley Crowther called They Live by Night a "commonplace little story" and wrote: "Although it—like others—is misguided in its sympathies for a youthful crook, this crime-and-compassion melodrama has the virtues of vigor and restraint ... 'They Live by Night' has the failing of waxing sentimental over crime, but it manages to generate interest with its crisp dramatic movement and clear-cut types."

Eddie Muller listed it as one of his Top 25 Noir Films: "Film noir's version of Romeo and Juliet, made with amazing conviction by Nicholas Ray. A smart, soulful film full of evocative details, including a wonderfully intricate soundtrack."

On the review aggregator website Rotten Tomatoes, 96% of 26 critics' reviews are positive. Metacritic, which uses a weighted average, assigned the film a score of 82 out of 100, based on 12 critics, indicating "universal acclaim".

=== Home media ===
Warner Home Video released the film on DVD on July 31, 2007, as part of the Film Noir Classic Collection boxset, while the newly restored edition for the film was issued on Blu-ray and DVD by the Criterion Collection on June 13, 2017, respectively; Criterion's release was a new remaster from a 2K digital restoration of the original nitrate elements.
