= Cathy O'Donnell =

American actress (1923–1970)

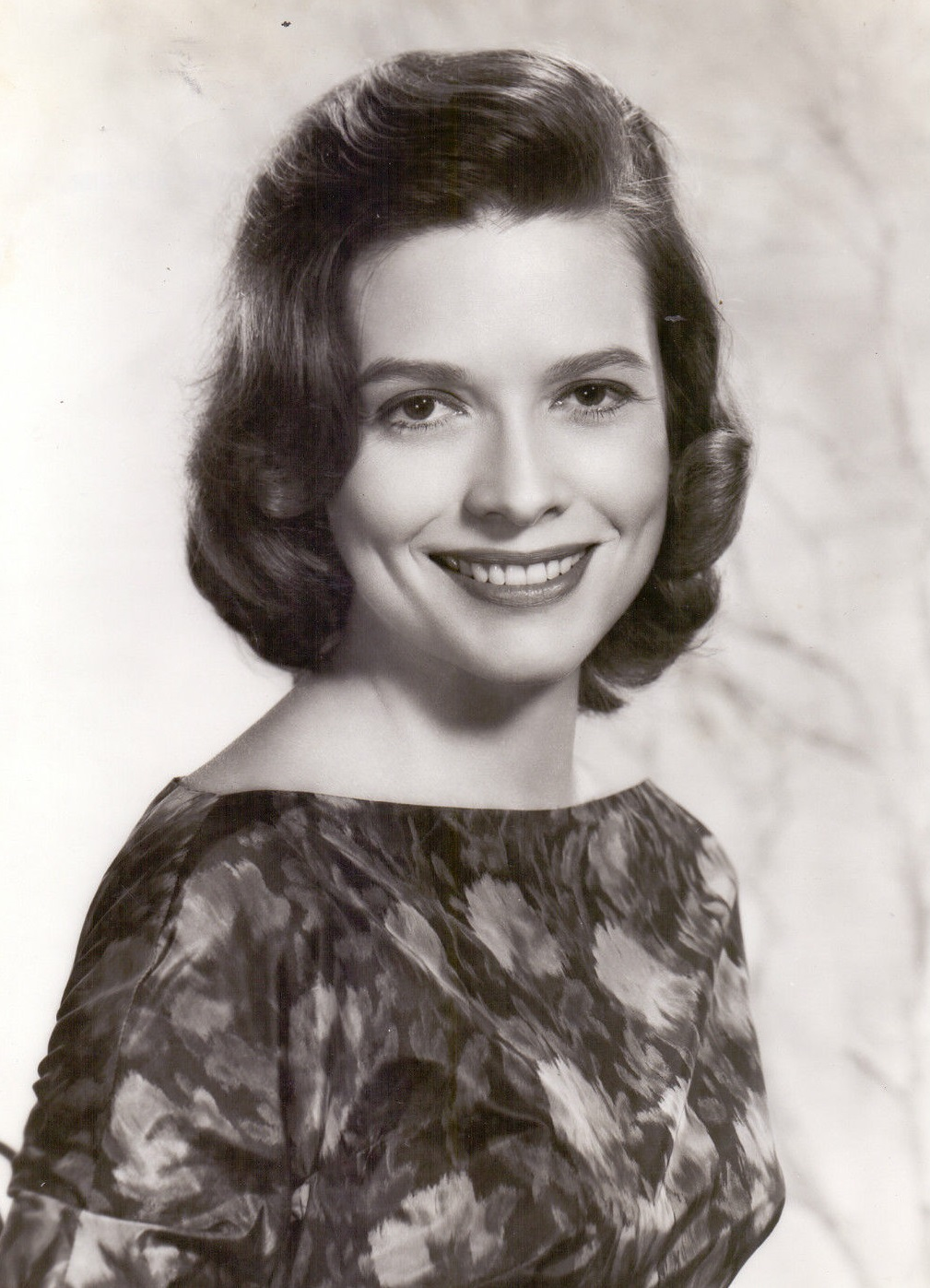
- O'Donnell in 1959
- Born: Ann Steely; July 6, 1923; Siluria, Alabama, U.S.
- Died: April 11, 1970 (aged 46); Los Angeles, California, U.S.
- Resting place: Forest Lawn Memorial Park, Glendale
- Occupation: actress
- Years active: 1945–1964
- Spouse: Robert Wyler (m. 1948)

Cathy O'Donnell (born Ann Steely, July 6, 1923 – April 11, 1970) was an American actress who appeared in The Best Years of Our Lives, Ben-Hur, and films noir such as Detective Story and They Live by Night.

== Early life ==
O'Donnell was born Ann Steely in Siluria, Alabama. Her father, Grady Steely, was a schoolteacher and owned a local movie theatre. Her family moved to Greensboro, Alabama when she was seven, then to Oklahoma City when she was twelve. There she attended Harding Junior High School and Classen High School. She told a Boston Globe reporter in 1946 that she first became interested in acting at age fourteen after seeing Janet Gaynor in A Star Is Born. After high school she worked in a U.S. Army induction centre as a stenographer. She left that job to study acting at Oklahoma City University, where she played Juliet in a college production of Romeo and Juliet. She then saved money for a two-week trip to Hollywood, where she hoped to begin a movie career.

During her brief trip to Hollywood, an agent of Samuel Goldwyn spotted her at a drugstore. Although a screen test revealed her thick Southern accent, Goldwyn was impressed with her appearance and put her under contract. He sent her for acting and diction lessons and had her cast in local plays, including a Pasadena Playhouse dramatization of Little Women. She later changed her name to Cathy, after the female protagonist in Wuthering Heights. She then changed her last name to O'Donnell as recommended by Goldwyn's wife, who claimed that audiences loved actors with Irish last names.

== Career ==
O'Donnell appeared on stage in Boston in Life with Father in 1944. She made her film debut as an uncredited extra in Wonder Man (1945).

Her first major film role was in 1946's The Best Years of Our Lives, playing Wilma Cameron, the high-school sweetheart of Navy veteran Homer Parrish. Homer was played by real-life World War II veteran and double amputee Harold Russell.

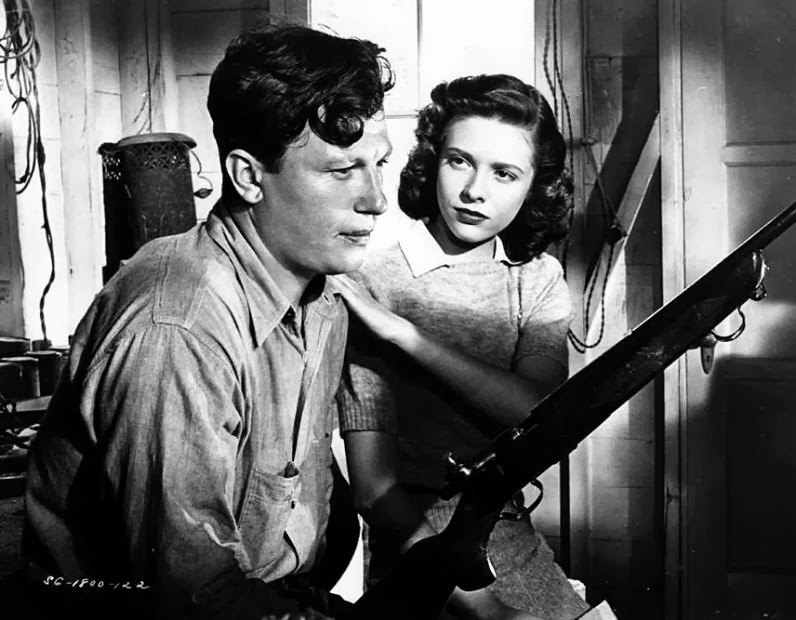
Harold Russell and Cathy O'Donnell in The Best Years of Our Lives, 1946

O'Donnell was loaned to RKO for They Live by Night (1948). Farley Granger played her love interest. The film is on The Guardian's list of the top 10 noir films. The two actors appeared together again in Side Street (1950).

Later she starred in The Miniver Story (also 1950) as Judy Miniver. She had a large supporting role in Detective Story (1951) with Kirk Douglas. She appeared as Barbara Waggoman, the love interest of James Stewart's character in the western The Man from Laramie (1955). Her final film role was in Ben-Hur (1959) playing the part of Tirzah, the sister to Judah Ben-Hur.

In the 1960s she appeared in TV shows such as Perry Mason, The Rebel and Man Without a Gun. Her last screen appearance was in 1964 in an episode of Bonanza.

== Personal life and death ==
In 1946, while acting in The Best Years of Our Lives, O'Donnell met director William Wyler's older brother Robert Wyler. On April 11, 1948, at age 24, she married 47-year-old Robert. After four days, O'Donnell filed for divorce, alleging Robert of "extreme cruelty." A month later, they reconciled.

On April 11, 1970, her 22nd wedding anniversary, O'Donnell died after a long battle with cancer. She is interred at Forest Lawn Memorial Park, Glendale, California.

== Filmography ==
=== Films ===
Year	Film	Director	Role	Notes
1945	Wonder Man	H. Bruce Humberstone	Nightclub Extra	Uncredited
1946	The Best Years of Our Lives	William Wyler	Wilma Cameron	
1947	Bury Me Dead	Bernard Vorhaus	Rusty	
1948	The Amazing Mr. X	Bernard Vorhaus	Janet Burke	
1948	They Live by Night	Nicholas Ray	Catherine "Keechie" Mobley	
1950	Side Street	Anthony Mann	Ellen Norson	
1950	The Miniver Story	H.C. Potter	Judy Miniver	
1951	Never Trust a Gambler	Ralph Murphy	Virginia Merrill	
1951	Detective Story	William Wyler	Susan Carmichael	
1952	The Woman's Angle	Leslie Arliss	Nina Van Rhyne	
1954	Eight O'Clock Walk	Lance Comfort	Jill Manning	
1954	Loves of Three Queens	Edgar G. Ulmer	Enone	segment "The Face That Launched a Thousand Ships"
1955	Mad at the World	Harry Essex	Anne Bennett	
1955	The Man from Laramie	Anthony Mann	Barbara Waggoman	
1957	The Deerslayer	Kurt Neumann	Judith Hutter	
1957	The Story of Mankind	Irwin Allen	Early Christian Woman	
1958	My World Dies Screaming	Harold Daniels	Sheila Wayne Tierney	retitled Terror in the Haunted House
1959	Ben-Hur	William Wyler	Tirzah	

=== Television ===
Year	Show	Episode	Role	Notes
1951	Lights Out	To See Ourselves		Season 4 Episode 4
1953	Orient Express	13th Spy	Francine Gilman	Season 1 Episode 13
1954	The Philip Morris Playhouse	Up for Parole		Season 1 Episode 19
1954	Orient Express	The Human Bond		Season ? Episode ?
1954	Center Stage	Chivalry at Howling Creek		Season 1 Episode 1
1954	The Motorola Television Hour	Chivalry at Howling Creek		Season 1 Episode 16
1955	The Best of Broadway	The Best of Broadway	Amy Fisher	Season 1 Episode 6
1955	Climax!	Flight 951	Mona Herbert	Season 1 Episode 22
1956	Matinee Theater	Greybeards and Witches	Velna	Season 1 Episode 130
1958	Zane Grey Theatre	Sundown at Bitter Creek	Jennie Parsons	Season 2 Episode 19
1958	The Californians	Skeleton in the Closet	Grace Adams	Season 1 Episode 28
1958	Target	Fateful Decision		Season 1 Episode 22
1959	Man Without a Gun	Accused		Season 2 Episode 10
1960	The Detectives	The Trap	Laurie Dolan	Season 1 Episode 17
1960	The Rebel	You Steal My Eyes	Prudence Gant	Season 1 Episode 24
1960	Tate	Quiet After the Storm	Amy	Season 1 Episode 12
1960	The Rebel	The Hope Chest	Felicity Bowman	Season 2 Episode 15
1961	Perry Mason	The Case of the Fickle Fortune	Norma Brooks	Season 4 Episode 15
1961	Sugarfoot	Angel	Angel	Season 4 Episode 7
1964	Bonanza	The Lila Conrad Story	Sarah Knowles	Season 5 Episode 14
