= Anthony Ray (producer) =

American actor, assistant director, producer and production managers

- Anthony Ray in Shadows 1959
- Born: November 24, 1937; Washington, D.C., U.S.
- Died: June 29, 2018 (aged 80); Saco, Maine, U.S.
- Education: Neighborhood Playhouse School of the Theatre
- Occupations: Actor, assistant director, producer, production manager
- Spouses: Gloria Grahame (m. 1960; div. 1974); Eve Ray (m. 1982)
- Children: 3
- Parent(s): Nicholas Ray (father); Jean Evans (mother)
- Relatives: Gloria Grahame (stepmother)

Anthony Ray (November 24, 1937 – June 29, 2018) was an American actor, assistant director, producer, and production manager. He was nominated for an Academy Award in the category Best Picture for the film An Unmarried Woman.

== Early life ==
Ray was born in Washington, D.C. to film director, screenwriter, and actor Nicholas Ray, and writer Jean Evans, but grew up in New York City and later lived in Hollywood. He graduated from the Neighborhood Playhouse.

== Career ==
Ray began acting in 1957. He appeared in the Broadway play The Dark at the Top of the Stairs and in productions such as Men in War, Shadows, the soap opera Search for Tomorrow, The Twilight Zone, The Many Loves of Dobie Gillis, and The Untouchables.

Ray became the executive in charge of East Coast production for 20th Century Fox and was a member of the production or director cadres for films other than An Unmarried Woman including Spartacus, The Misfits, Bob & Carol & Ted & Alice, Alex in Wonderland, Cactus Flower, Blume in Love, Harry and Tonto, Next Stop, Greenwich Village, Freebie and the Bean, Willie & Phil, and The Rose, as well as TV shows such as Bewitched and Iron Horse.

Ray was a member of the Actors Studio, the Academy of Motion Picture Arts and Sciences, the Directors Guild of America, and the Screen Actors Guild. He contributed to the creation of a film program at Emerson College and had directed the International Film and Television Workshop of the Maine Media Workshops in Rockport, Maine.

== Personal life and death ==
Ray had a daughter with his wife Eve. He died after a long illness on June 29, 2018, in Saco, Maine, where he lived the last 10 years of his life. He was 80. Ray and his first wife Gloria Grahame had two sons. Grahame was 14 years older than Ray and had previously been married to Ray's father. According to Nicholas Ray, he caught Grahame and a 13-year-old Tony in bed together, which effectively ended their marriage in 1950.

== Selected filmography ==
- An Unmarried Woman (1978; co-nominated with Paul Mazursky for Academy Award in Best Picture)
