= Jean Evans (writer) =

Canadian journalist and writer (1913–?)

- Born: Jean Abrahams; September 10, 1913; Winnipeg, Canada
- Education: Pasadena Junior College
- Occupations: Journalist; psychology writer
- Spouse: Nicholas Ray (m. 1936; div. 1942)
- Children: Anthony Ray
- Writing career
- Genre: Non-fiction
- Notable awards: Guggenheim Fellowship (1950 and 1955)

Jean Abrams (born Jean Abrahams; September 10, 1913 – ?), known under the pen name Jean Evans, was a Canadian journalist and non-fiction writer. Born in Winnipeg and educated at a California college, she worked in New York City as a feature writer for the newspaper PM and its successor the New York Star. She was awarded the Guggenheim Fellowship twice, in 1950 and 1955, and wrote the book Three Men: An Experiment in the Biography of Emotion (1954).

== Early life and career ==
Jean Abrahams was born on September 10, 1913, in Winnipeg. She attended Pasadena Junior College from 1930 to 1931. Employed by the Federal Theatre Project in the 1930s, she moved to New York City for their Living Newspaper project. She adopted the Anglicized surname Abrams, before she started using the pen name Jean Evans.

In 1946, Evans was awarded the New York Newspaper Women's Club Award (now the Front Page Award). She remained a feature writer at PM as it became the New York Star in 1948, remaining there until the next year. Reuel Denney said that her "portrait-interviews" at PM were among the most prominent parts of the newspaper, being a "psychiatric case histories in miniature". In addition to journalism, she also wrote poetry.

In 1950, Evans was awarded a Guggenheim Fellowship "for the completion of studies of contemporary personalities". In 1954, she published Three Men: An Experiment in the Biography of Emotion, centered on three people: two of lower-class backgrounds and one of upper-class background. She received another Fellowship in 1955.

== Personal life ==
Evans met Nicholas Ray while living in New York City, and they started a relationship. They married in 1936. When Ray took a position at the Works Progress Administration in Washington, D.C. by January 1937, they had moved to Arlington, Virginia. They had one son, Anthony Ray, named for Ray's friend and fellow Federal Theatre director Anthony Mann. Washington government life wore on both Ray and Evans, and Ray's drinking and infidelity strained their marriage. Evans moved back to New York City in 1940, having found a job at PM, the new leftist newspaper. Ray returned to New York in May of that year, but the couple soon separated. A few months later Ray again attempted to reconcile, while also living at Almanac House, a Greenwich Village loft occupied by Pete Seeger, Lee Hays, and Millard Lampell, core members of the Almanac Singers. Evans filed for divorce in December 1941, and the process was finalized the next summer.

== Works ==
- Three Men: An Experiment in the Biography of Emotion (1954) (Note: Reviews of this work:)
