= Thieves Like Us (film) =

1974 film by Robert Altman

- Directed by: Robert Altman
- Screenplay by: Joan Tewkesbury; Calder Willingham; Robert Altman
- Based on: Thieves Like Us by Edward Anderson
- Produced by: Jerry Bick
- Starring: Keith Carradine; Shelley Duvall; John Schuck; Bert Remsen; Louise Fletcher; Tom Skerritt
- Cinematography: Jean Boffety
- Edited by: Lou Lombardo
- Distributed by: United Artists
- Release date: February 11, 1974
- Running time: 123 minutes
- Country: United States
- Language: English
- Box office: $300,000 (US/Canada rentals)

Thieves Like Us is a 1974 American crime film, set in the United States of the 1930s. It was directed by Robert Altman and starred Keith Carradine and Shelley Duvall. The film was based on the novel of the same name by Edward Anderson, which also supplied source material for the 1948 film They Live by Night, directed by Nicholas Ray. The Altman film sticks much closer to the book. The supporting cast includes Louise Fletcher and Tom Skerritt.

The film was entered into the 1974 Cannes Film Festival.

== Plot summary ==
Bowie, a young man convicted of murder when a teenager, and Chicamaw, an old lag, escape from a Mississippi prison in 1936 and join up with another old lag, T-Dub, who has hired a cab to meet them. They hide out with an acquaintance, who owns a garage and set to work robbing banks. Here Bowie gets to talk to Keechie, the garageman's daughter. They next hole up with T-Dub's sister-in-law Mattie and her children, including her older daughter Lula, the object of T-Dub's lascivious attention.

Bowie is injured in a car crash, after which Chicamaw guns down an inquisitive officer. He leaves Bowie at the garage, where Keechie takes care of him. They become lovers but Bowie has no intention of turning his back on crime. Bowie leaves to meet up with the others and they rob a bank but the trigger-happy Chicamaw shoots and kills a bank clerk. The robbers split up and Bowie returns to a distraught Keechie. We learn that T-Dub has been killed and Chicamaw recaptured and returned to prison. After persuading an unwilling Mattie to let the pregnant Keechie stay in a cabin at her motel, Bowie, posing as a sheriff, springs Chicamaw from prison but the latter, while claiming to have merely tied the warden to a tree, has instead shot him dead.

Bowie forces Chicamaw out of the car and leaves him at the side of the road to fend for himself. Returning to the motel cabin he is ambushed by Rangers, who blast the cabin with gunfire, watched by an anguished Keechie, forcibly restrained by Mattie, who has betrayed Bowie. Bowie's bloody corpse is carried out and laid on the mud. In the final scene we see Keechie at the station, ready to take the first train out to find a place where she can have her baby. (In Anderson's novel, she too is killed by the Rangers.)

== Cast ==
- Keith Carradine as Bowie
- Shelley Duvall as Keechie
- John Schuck as Chicamaw
- Bert Remsen as "T-Dub"
- Louise Fletcher as Mattie
- Tom Skerritt as Dee Mobley

== Production notes ==
This film has no traditional score. All music in the film is diegetic music or "source music" usually presented as coming from a radio. The film features a large number of small-town people as extras. Thieves Like Us was largely filmed on location in Mississippi.

== Reception ==
Roger Ebert of the Chicago Sun-Times gave the film three-and-a-half stars out of four, writing that it 'no doubt has all sorts of weaknesses in character and plot, but which manages a visual strategy so perfectly controlled that we get an uncanny feel for this time and this place'. Gene Siskel of the Chicago Tribune awarded two-and-a-half stars out of four, saying that the film 'at least on the story level, breaks no new ground' in that the criminals' actions 'are reminiscent of Bonnie and Clyde and a host of lesser films', adding 'Indeed, the major element of surprise in Thieves Like Us is that Altman doesn't surprise us at all.' Vincent Canby of The New York Times called the film 'such an engaging, sharply-observed account of a long-lost time, and of some of the people who briefly inhabited it, that I hope it doesn't get confused with other films that seem, superficially anyway, to have covered the same territory'. Variety wrote, "Thieves Like Us proves that when Robert Altman has a solid story and script, he can make an exceptional film, one mostly devoid of clutter, auterist mannerism, and other current cinema chic." Pauline Kael of The New Yorker wrote that the film 'seems to achieve beauty without artifice. It's the closest to flawless of Altman's films—a masterpiece.' Kevin Thomas of the Los Angeles Times wrote, 'Demanding and subtle, a seductive reverie of a film, Thieves Like Us affirms Robert Altman's place in the front ranks of American directors.' In a negative review for The Washington Post, Gary Arnold called the film 'disappointing', writing that 'the beautiful images seem to freeze or petrify on the screen, because Altman does not bring any intensity to the narrative'.

On the review aggregator website Rotten Tomatoes, 79% of 28 critics' reviews are positive.

== Awards and honors ==
- 2002: AFI's 100 Years...100 Passions – Nominated
- 2008: AFI's 10 Top 10:
  - Nominated Gangster Film

== See also ==
- List of American films of 1974
