= Barbra Streisand discography =

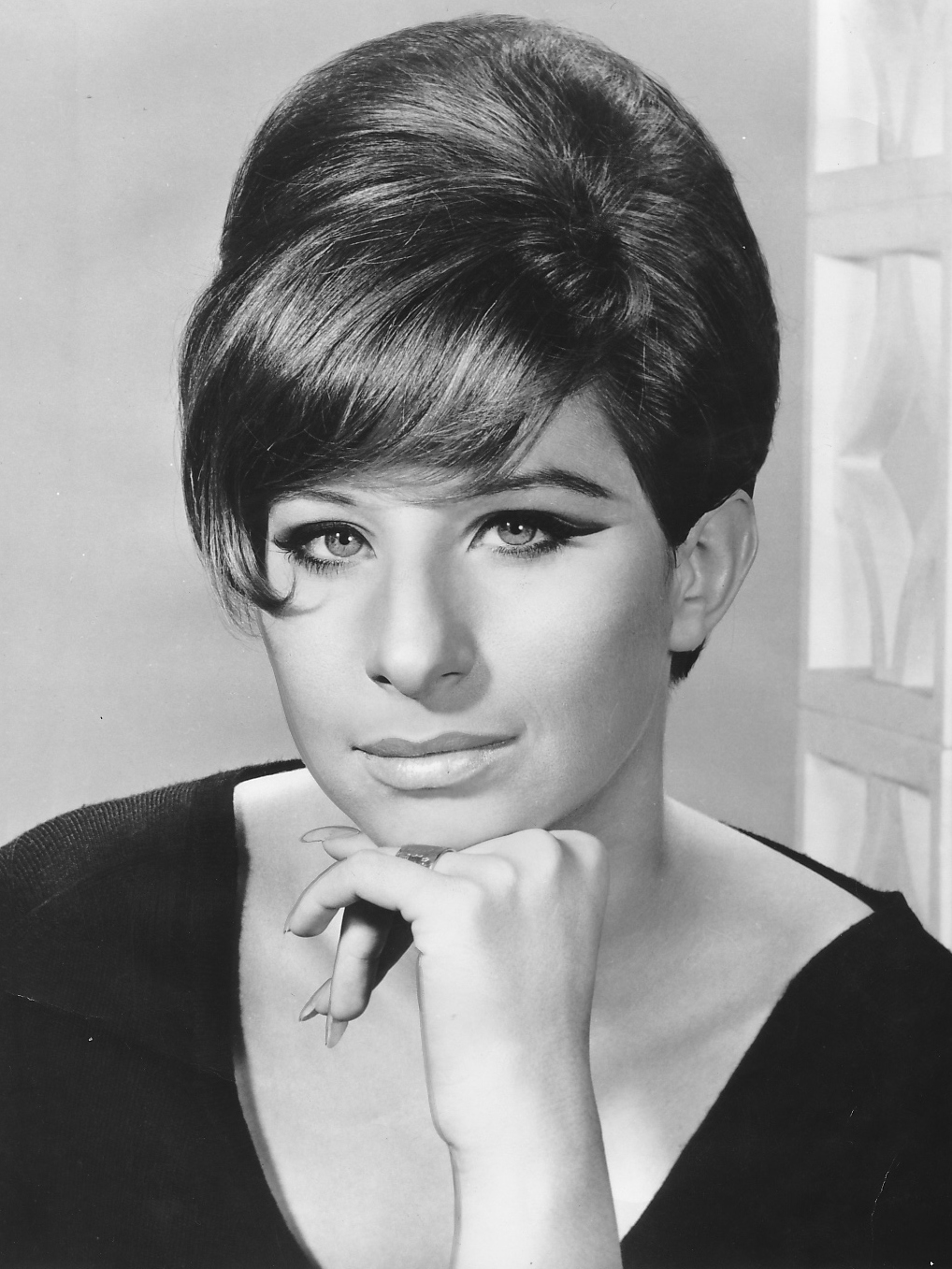
- Studio albums: 37
- Soundtrack albums: 15
- Live albums: 11
- Compilation albums: 12
- Singles: 120
- Video albums: 10
- Music videos: 24

Barbra Streisand is an American actress and singer. Her discography consists of 120 singles, 37 studio albums, 12 compilations, 11 live albums, and 15 soundtracks. According to the Recording Industry Association of America, Streisand is the third-best-selling female album artist in the United States with 68.5 million certified albums in the country, and a career total of 200 million sold worldwide making her one of the best-selling music artists of all time.

With 52 gold and 31 platinum albums, Streisand exceeds all other female singers and all other recording artists other than Elvis Presley. She is the only female artist to have achieved fourteen multi-platinum albums, including the soundtrack for her film A Star Is Born. Her recordings have earned her eight Grammy Awards and the Grammy's Lifetime Achievement Award and Legend Award. According to Billboard, till 2021 Streisand holds the record for the female with the most number one albums (11). Billboard also recognizes Streisand as the greatest female of all time on its Billboard 200 chart and one of the greatest artists of all time on its Billboard Hot 100 chart. She has had No. 1 albums in each of the last six decades, a record not matched by any other artist. Her 2014 Columbia Records album, Partners became her tenth No. 1 album. With a total of 34 Billboard Top 10 albums to her credit since 1963, Streisand holds the records for the most Top 10 albums by a female artist and for the widest span (52 years) between first and latest Top 10 albums by a female recording artist. Her albums Higher Ground (1997), Back to Broadway (1993), Love Is the Answer (2009), Partners (2014) and Encore: Movie Partners Sing Broadway (2016) all entered the Billboard 200 album chart at No. 1.

She has achieved five No. 1 singles in the US, and is also one of the few acts with top 10 hits in four different decades. In 1974, "The Way We Were" became the first original single by a female artist to achieve the No. 1 song of the year in US. "Woman in Love" from Guilty is one of the best-selling singles of all time in France.

In 1964, Streisand became the first and only female artist to place three albums in the top 10 on Billboard's annual albums chart. Five Streisand albums appeared on the Billboard 200 album chart on October 31, 1964, Streisand held the record for the female with the most albums in the Top 200 simultaneously for nearly half a century, until Whitney Houston had ten albums place in the Billboard 200 chart at the same time after fans learned of her death. In 1982, "Memories" became the UK's best-selling album of the year (where it was released as Love Songs), the first album by a female performer to achieve it. During March 5–19, 1977, Streisand became the first female singer to have a No. 1 album (A Star Is Born) and single (“Evergreen (Love Theme from A Star Is Born)”) in the same week in the US. Streisand's biggest-selling album, Guilty (1980), was a collaboration with Barry Gibb of the Bee Gees and sold over 15 million copies worldwide as well as spawning several hit singles. In the UK, she became the first female solo artist to have a No. 1 album (Guilty) and single ("Woman in Love") in the same week. 25 years later, Streisand and Gibb teamed up again to create Guilty Pleasures, known as Guilty Too in some countries.

== Albums ==
=== Studio albums ===
List of studio albums, with selected chart positions, sales figures and certifications
Title	Album details	Peak chart positions										Certifications	Sales
Title	Album details	US	AUS	AUT	CAN	NOR	NZ	SPA	SWE	SWI	UK	Certifications	Sales
The Barbra Streisand Album	Released: February 25, 1963; Label: Columbia; Formats: LP · cassette · CD	8	6	—	—	—	—	—	—	—	—	US: Gold	World: 1,000,000 (as of March 1966)
The Second Barbra Streisand Album	Released: August 1963; Label: Columbia; Formats: LP · cassette · CD	2	—	—	—	—	—	—	—	—	—	US: Gold	World: 1,000,000 (as of March 1966)
The Third Album	Released: February 1964; Label: Columbia; Formats: LP · cassette · CD	5	—	—	—	—	—	—	—	—	—	US: Gold	World: 1,000,000 (as of March 1966)
People	Released: September 1964; Label: Columbia; Formats: LP · cassette · CD	1	—	—	—	—	—	—	—	—	—	US: Platinum	World: 1,000,000 (as of March 1966)
My Name Is Barbra	Released: May 1965; Label: Columbia; Formats: LP · cassette · CD	2	—	—	—	—	—	—	—	—	—	US: Gold	World: 1,000,000 (as of March 1966)
My Name Is Barbra, Two...	Released: October 1965; Label: Columbia; Formats: LP · cassette · CD	2	5	—	—	—	—	—	—	—	6	US: Platinum	World: 1,000,000 (as of March 1966)
Color Me Barbra	Released: March 1966; Label: Columbia; Formats: LP · cassette · CD	3	5	—	—	15	—	—	—	—	—	US: Gold	
Je m'appelle Barbra	Released: October 1966; Label: Columbia; Formats: LP · cassette · CD	5	—	—	—	—	—	—	—	—	—	US: Gold	
Simply Streisand	Released: October 1967; Label: Columbia; Formats: LP · cassette · CD	12	—	—	—	—	—	—	—	—	—	US: Gold	
A Christmas Album	Released: October 1967; Label: Columbia; Formats: LP · cassette · CD	108	—	—	—	—	—	—	—	—	—	US: 5× Platinum; AUS: Gold	US: 5,300,000
What About Today?	Released: July 1969; Label: Columbia; Formats: LP · cassette · CD	31	—	—	26	—	—	—	—	—	—		
Stoney End	Released: February 1971; Label: Columbia; Formats: LP · cassette · CD	10	—	—	12	—	—	—	—	—	28	US: Platinum	
Barbra Joan Streisand	Released: August 1971; Label: Columbia; Formats: LP · cassette · CD	11	—	—	25	—	—	—	—	—	—	US: Gold	
Barbra Streisand...and Other Musical Instruments	Released: November 2, 1973; Label: Columbia; Formats: LP · cassette · CD	64	—	—	80	—	—	—	—	—	—		
The Way We Were	Released: January 30, 1974; Label: Columbia; Formats: LP · cassette · CD	1	10	—	3	—	—	—	—	—	49	US: 2× Platinum; AUS: Gold; CAN: 2× Platinum	
ButterFly	Released: October 1, 1974; Label: Columbia; Formats: LP · cassette · CD	13	49	—	11	—	—	—	—	—	—	US: Gold	
Lazy Afternoon	Released: October 14, 1975; Label: Columbia; Formats: LP · cassette · CD	12	84	—	54	—	—	—	—	—	—	US: Gold	
Classical Barbra	Released: February 1976; Label: Columbia; Formats: LP · cassette · CD	46	—	—	87	—	—	—	—	—	—	US: Gold	
Superman	Released: June 1977; Label: Columbia; Formats: LP · cassette · CD	3	11	—	1	—	33	—	46	—	32	US: 2× Platinum; AUS: Gold; CAN: 2× Platinum	
Songbird	Released: May 1978; Label: Columbia; Formats: LP · cassette · CD	12	30	—	10	—	—	—	—	—	48	US: Platinum; AUS: Gold; CAN: Platinum	
Wet	Released: October 1979; Label: Columbia; Formats: LP · cassette · CD	7	7	—	7	39	21	—	22	—	25	US: Platinum; AUS: Platinum; CAN: Platinum; UK: Gold	
Guilty	Released: September 23, 1980; Label: Columbia; Formats: LP · cassette · CD	1	1	1	3	1	1	1	1	1	1	US: 5× Platinum; AUS: 6× Platinum; CAN: 5× Platinum; GER: Platinum; FIN: Diamond; FRA: 2× Platinum; UK: Platinum	US: 5,000,000; AUT: 50,000; UK: 750,000; World: 15,000,000
Emotion	Released: October 9, 1984; Label: Columbia; Formats: LP · cassette · CD	19	13	13	44	13	25	—	23	17	15	US: Platinum; AUS: Platinum; CAN: Gold	
The Broadway Album	Released: November 5, 1985; Label: Columbia; Formats: LP · cassette · CD	1	8	29	11	—	1	—	26	—	3	US: 4× Platinum; AUS: 2× Platinum; CAN: 2× Platinum; UK: Gold	World: 7,500,000
Till I Loved You	Released: October 25, 1988; Label: Columbia; Formats: LP · cassette · CD	10	21	—	—	16	—	19	34	16	29	US: Platinum; AUS: Platinum; CAN: Platinum; SWI: Gold	
Back to Broadway	Released: June 29, 1993; Label: Columbia; Formats: LP · cassette · CD	1	3	37	6	—	11	—	32	—	4	US: 2× Platinum; AUS: Gold; CAN: Platinum; UK: Gold	
Higher Ground	Released: November 11, 1997; Label: Columbia; Formats: Cassette · CD	1	14	42	5	16	23	29	34	15	12	US: 3× Platinum; AUS: Platinum; CAN: 3× Platinum; UK: Gold	World: 5,000,000
A Love Like Ours	Released: September 21, 1999; Label: Columbia; Formats: Cassette · CD	6	12	45	29	6	38	44	—	39	12	US: Platinum; AUS: Gold; CAN: Gold; UK: Gold	US: 1,100,000
Christmas Memories	Released: October 30, 2001; Label: Columbia; Formats: Cassette · CD	15	146	—	—	—	—	—	—	—	137	US: Platinum	US: 1,100,000
The Movie Album	Released: October 14, 2003; Label: Columbia; Formats: CD	5	36	—	10	—	—	12	—	—	25	US: Gold; AUS: Gold; UK: Silver	US: 694,000
Guilty Pleasures	Released: September 20, 2005; Label: Columbia; Formats: CD	5	22	20	9	29	12	21	13	51	3	US: Gold; CAN: Gold; UK: Platinum	US: 509,000
Love Is the Answer	Released: September 29, 2009; Label: Columbia; Formats: CD	1	22	10	2	—	15	6	33	32	1	US: Gold; CAN: Gold; UK: Gold	US: 521,000
What Matters Most	Released: August 23, 2011; Label: Columbia; Formats: CD	4	42	29	10	30	—	18	54	28	7		
Partners	Released: September 16, 2014; Label: Columbia; Formats: LP, CD	1	1	10	1	25	2	4	—	16	2	AUS: Platinum; NZ: Gold; UK: Platinum; US: Platinum	
Encore: Movie Partners Sing Broadway	Released: August 26, 2016; Label: Columbia; Formats: LP, CD	1	1	2	3	—	2	4	—	24	1	AUS: Gold	World: 600,000
Walls	Released: November 2, 2018; Label: Columbia; Formats: LP, CD	12	7	18	33	—	38	16	—	19	6	UK: Silver	
The Secret of Life: Partners, Volume Two	Released: June 27, 2025; Label: Columbia; Formats: LP, CD	31	63	14	—	—	—	—	—	23	40		
"—" denotes items which were not released in that country or failed to chart.

=== Live albums ===
List of live albums, with selected chart positions, sales figures and certifications
Title	Album details	Peak chart positions										Certifications	Sales
Title	Album details	US	AUS	AUT	CAN	NOR	NZ	SPA	SWE	SWI	UK	Certifications	Sales
A Happening in Central Park	Released: September 1968; Label: Columbia; Formats: LP · cassette · CD	30	—	—	19	—	—	—	—	—	—	US: Gold	
Live Concert at the Forum	Released: October 1, 1972; Label: Columbia; Formats: LP · cassette · CD	19	—	—	17	—	—	—	—	—	—	US: Platinum	
One Voice	Released: April 1987; Label: Columbia; Formats: LP · cassette · CD	9	15	—	28	—	7	18	33	—	27	US: Platinum; AUS: Gold; CAN: 2× Platinum	
The Concert	Released: September 1994; Label: Columbia; Formats: LP · cassette · CD	10	20	—	27	—	—	12	—	—	63	US: 3× Platinum; AUS: Platinum; CAN: 3× Platinum	US: 1,100,000
The Concert: Highlights	Released: 1995; Label: Columbia; Formats: Cassette · CD	81	—	—	—	—	—	—	—	—	—	US: Gold	US: 501,000
Timeless: Live in Concert	Released: September 19, 2000; Label: Columbia; Formats: Cassette · CD	21	66	—	—	—	—	—	—	—	54	US: Platinum	US: 477,000
Live in Concert 2006	Released: May 8, 2007; Label: Columbia; Formats: Cassette · CD	7	157	7	—	—	—	8	—	23	48		
One Night Only: Barbra Streisand and Quartet at The Village Vanguard	Released: May 4, 2010; Label: Columbia; Formats: CD · DVD · Blu-ray	—	14	4	—	—	6	—	—	6	2	US: Platinum	
Back to Brooklyn	Released: November 25, 2013; Label: Columbia; Formats: CD	—	—	—	—	—	—	—	—	—	102		
The Music...The Mem'ries...The Magic!	Released: December 8, 2017; Label: Columbia; Formats: CD	69	45	—	—	—	6	—	—	—	65		US: 11,000
Live at the Bon Soir	Released: November 4, 2022; Label: Columbia; Formats: LP, CD, digital	150	—	—	—	—	—	82	—	—	—		
"—" denotes items which were not released in that country or failed to chart.

=== Compilation albums ===
List of compilation albums, with selected chart positions, sales figures and certifications
Title	Album details	Peak chart positions										Certifications	Sales
Title	Album details	US	AUS	AUT	CAN	NOR	NZ	SPA	SWE	SWI	UK	Certifications	Sales
Barbra Streisand's Greatest Hits	Released: January 1970; Label: Columbia; Formats: LP · cassette · CD	32	—	17	17	—	—	—	—	—	44	US: 2× Platinum; AUS: Gold	
Barbra Streisand's Greatest Hits Volume 2	Released: November 15, 1978; Label: Columbia; Formats: LP · cassette · CD	1	2	1	1	—	1	—	—	—	1	US: 5× Platinum; AUS: 2× Platinum; CAN: 5× Platinum	
Memories	Released: November 1981; Label: Columbia; Formats: LP · cassette · CD	10	7	14	3	12	2	20	4	—	1	US: 5× Platinum; AUS: 6× Platinum; CAN: 5× Platinum	World: 10,000,000
A Collection: Greatest Hits...and More	Released: October 3, 1989; Label: Columbia; Formats: LP · cassette · CD	26	22	43	8	6	40	83	1	—	22	US: 2× Platinum; AUS: Platinum; CAN: 2× Platinum	
Just for the Record... (Note: A single-disc Highlights from Just for the Record..., which featured a sampling of tracks of Barbra over the years, was also released in 1991.)	Released: September 24, 1991; Label: Columbia; Formats: LP · cassette · CD	38	126	—	—	—	—	—	—	—	—	US: Platinum	US: 454,000
The Essential Barbra Streisand	Released: January 29, 2002; Label: Columbia; Formats: Cassette · CD	15	5	—	8	42	3	14	4	—	1	US: Platinum; AUS: 2× Platinum; UK: Platinum	
Duets	Released: November 26, 2002; Label: Columbia; Formats: Cassette · CD	38	13	—	44	9	11	26	—	88	30	US: Gold; AUS: Platinum	World: 1,500,000
The Ultimate Collection	Released: March 29, 2010; Label: Columbia; Formats: CD	—	58	—	23	32 (Note: The European edition of The Ultimate Collection also charted in Norway and Switzerland at number 4 and number 60, respectively.)	—	73	24	82	8		
Release Me	Released: September 25, 2012; Label: Columbia; Formats: LP · CD	7	114	8	138	37	—	33	—	78	31		
The Classic Christmas Album	Released: September 27, 2013; Label: Columbia; Formats: LP · CD	95	—	—	37	—	—	—	—	—	—		
Release Me 2	Released: August 6, 2021; Label: Columbia; Formats: LP · Cassette · CD	15	15	19	—	—	—	—	—	16	5		
Evergreens: Celebrating Six Decades on Columbia Records	Released: October 27, 2023; Label: Columbia; Formats: LP · cassette · CD	— (Note: Evergreens did not enter the Billboard 200, but peaked at number 21 on the Top Current Album Sales Chart.)	—	—	—	—	—	—	—	—	— (Note: Evergreens did not enter the UK Albums Chart, but peaked at number 31 on the UK Album Sales Chart.)		
"—" denotes items which were not released in that country or failed to chart.

=== Cast recordings and soundtrack albums ===
List of cast recordings and soundtrack albums, with selected chart positions, sales figures and certifications
Title	Album details	Peak chart positions										Certifications	Sales
Title	Album details	US	AUS	AUT	CAN	NOR	NZ	SPA	SWE	SWI	UK	Certifications	Sales
I Can Get It for You Wholesale: Original Broadway Cast Recording	Released: April 1962; Label: Columbia; Formats: LP · cassette · CD	125	—	—	—	—	—	—	—	—	—		
Pins and Needles: 25th Anniversary	Released: May 1962; Label: Columbia; Formats: LP · cassette · CD	125	—	—	—	—	—	—	—	—	—		
Funny Girl – Original Broadway Cast Recording	Released: April 1964; Label: Capitol; Formats: LP · cassette · CD	2	8	—	—	—	—	—	—	—	—	US: Gold	
Funny Girl	Released: August 1968; Label: Columbia; Formats: LP · cassette · CD	12	4	—	10	—	—	6	—	—	11	US: Platinum; CAN: Gold	
Hello, Dolly!	Released: October 1969; Label: Columbia; Formats: LP · cassette · CD	49	—	—	33	—	—	17	—	—	45		
On a Clear Day You Can See Forever	Released: July 1970; Label: Columbia; Formats: LP · cassette · CD	108	—	—	—	—	—	—	—	—	—		
The Owl and the Pussycat	Released: December 19, 1970; Label: Columbia; Formats: LP · cassette · CD	186	—	—	74	—	—	—	—	—			
The Way We Were: Original Soundtrack Recording	Released: January 30, 1974; Label: Columbia; Formats: LP · cassette · CD	20	—	—	—	—	—	—	—	—		US: Gold	
Funny Lady	Released: March 15, 1975; Label: Arista; Formats: LP · cassette · CD	6	50	—	17	—	—	—	—	—	—	US: Gold	
A Star Is Born	Released: November 1976; Label: Columbia; Formats: LP · cassette · CD	1	3	—	1	—	9	10	22	—	1	US: 4× Platinum; AUS: 2× Platinum; CAN: 5× Platinum	World: 8,000,000
The Main Event	Released: June 1979; Label: Columbia; Formats: LP · cassette · CD	20	—	—	11	—	—	—	—	—	—	US: Gold	
Yentl	Released: November 8, 1983; Label: Columbia; Formats: LP · cassette · CD	9	24	7	16	26	5	—	29	4	21	US: Platinum; AUS: Gold; CAN: Platinum	World: 3,500,000
Nuts	Released: December 21, 1987; Label: Columbia; Formats: LP · cassette · CD	—	—	—	—	—	—	—	—	—	—		
The Prince of Tides	Released: November 12, 1991; Label: Columbia; Formats: LP · cassette · CD	84	—	—	—	—	—	—	—	—	—		
The Mirror Has Two Faces	Released: November 12, 1996; Label: Columbia; Formats: LP · cassette · CD	16	—	—	11	—	—	—	—	—	—	US: Platinum	
"—" denotes items which were not released in that country or failed to chart.

=== Featuring albums ===
Title	Album details
Harold Sings Arlen (With Friend)	Released: 1966; Label: Columbia; Formats: LP · cassette · CD

== Singles ==
=== 1960s ===
Year	Title	Peak chart positions										Album
Year	Title	US	US AC	US Cash Box	AUS	BEL	CAN	CAN AC	IRE	NLD	UK	Album
1962	"Miss Marmelstein"	—	—	—	—	—	—	—	—	—	—	I Can Get It for You Wholesale
1962	"Happy Days Are Here Again"	—	—	—	—	—	—	—	—	—	—	The Barbra Streisand Album
1962	"My Coloring Book"	—	—	—	—	—	—	—	—	—	—	The Second Barbra Streisand Album
1964	"People"	5	1	5	20	—	30	—	—	30	—	Funny Girl: Original Broadway Cast
1964	"I Am Woman"	— (Note: "I Am Woman" did not enter the Billboard Hot 100, but peaked at number 14 on the Bubbling Under Hot 100 Singles chart.)	—	— (Note: "I Am Woman" did not enter the Cash Box Top 100 Singles, but peaked at number 6 on the Cash Box Looking Ahead Singles chart.)	—	—	—	—	—	—	—	B-side of "People"
1964	"Funny Girl"	44	6	47	—	—	—	—	—	—	—	Non-album single
1964	"Absent Minded Me"	— (Note: "Absent Minded Me" did not enter the Billboard Hot 100, but peaked at number 23 on the Bubbling Under Hot 100 Singles chart.)	—	— (Note: "Absent Minded Me" did not enter the Cash Box Top 100 Singles, but peaked at number 5 on the Cash Box Looking Ahead Singles chart.)	—	—	—	—	—	—	—	B-side of "Funny Girl"
1965	"Why Did I Choose You"	77	15	72	—	—	—	—	—	—	—	My Name Is Barbra
1965	"My Man"	79	17	48	—	—	—	—	—	—	—	My Name Is Barbra
1965	"He Touched Me"	53	2	51	—	—	—	—	—	—	—	My Name Is Barbra, Two...
1965	"Second Hand Rose"	32	5	36	6	18	30	1	—	3	14	My Name Is Barbra, Two...
1966	"Where Am I Going?"	94	4	96	—	—	—	13	—	—	—	Color Me Barbra
1966	"You Wanna Bet"	—	18	—	—	—	—	—	—	—	—	B-side of "Where Am I Going?"
1966	"Sam, You Made the Pants Too Long"	98	9	79	—	—	—	—	—	—	—	Color Me Barbra
1966	"The Minute Waltz"	—	23	—	—	—	—	—	—	—	—	B-side of "Sam, You Made the Pants Too Long"
1966	"Non C'est Rien"	—	15	—	—	—	—	—	—	—	—	Color Me Barbra
1966	"Free Again"	83	8	66	—	—	—	—	—	—	—	Je m'appelle Barbra
1966	"Sleep in Heavenly Peace (Silent Night)"	—	—	—	72	—	—	—	—	—	—	A Christmas Album
1967	"Stout-hearted Men"	92	2	— (Note: "Stout-hearted Men" did not enter the Cash Box Top 100 Singles, but peaked at number 8 on the Cash Box Looking Ahead Singles chart.)	—	—	—	—	—	—	—	Simply Streisand
1967	"Lover Man (Oh, Where Can You Be?)"	—	29	—	—	—	—	—	—	—	—	Simply Streisand
1967	"Jingle Bells?"	—	—	—	—	—	—	—	—	—	—	A Christmas Album
1967	"Have Yourself a Merry Little Christmas"	—	—	—	—	—	—	—	—	—	—	A Christmas Album
1967	"The Christmas Song (Chestnuts Roasting on an Open Fire)"	—	—	—	—	—	—	—	—	—	—	A Christmas Album
1967	"The Lord's Prayer"	—	—	—	—	—	—	—	—	—	—	A Christmas Album
1968	"Our Corner of the Night"	— (Note: "Our Corner of the Night" did not enter the Billboard Hot 100, but peaked at number 7 on the Bubbling Under Hot 100 Singles chart.)	19	74	—	—	72	—	—	—	—	Non-album single
1968	"The Morning After"	—	—	—	—	—	—	—	—	—	—	What About Today?
1968	"Funny Girl"	—	25	—	—	—	—	—	—	—	—	Funny Girl: Original Soundtrack Recording
1968	"I'd Rather Be Blue over You (Than Be Happy with Somebody Else)"	—	19	—	—	—	—	—	—	—	—	B-side of "Funny Girl"
1968	"My Man"	—	—	— (Note: "My Man" did not enter the Cash Box Top 100 Singles, but peaked at number 7 on the Cash Box Looking Ahead Singles chart.)	—	—	—	—	—	—	—	Funny Girl (Original Soundtrack Recording)
1969	"Frank Mills"	—	—	—	—	—	—	—	—	—	—	Non-album single
1969	"Little Tin Soldier"	—	—	—	—	—	—	—	—	—	—	What About Today?
1969	"Honey Pie"	—	35	—	—	—	—	—	—	—	—	B-side of "Little Tin Soldier"
1969	"What Are You Doing the Rest of Your Life?"	—	—	—	—	—	—	—	—	—	—	The Way We Were
1969	"Before the Parade Passes By"	—	23	—	—	—	—	25	—	—	—	Hello, Dolly!
1969	"Hello, Dolly!"	—	—	—	—	—	—	—	—	—	—	Hello, Dolly!
"—" denotes a title that did not chart, or was not released in that territory

=== 1970s ===
Year	Title	Peak chart positions										Certifications	Album
Year	Title	US	US AC	US Cash Box	AUS	BEL	CAN	CAN AC	IRE	NLD	UK	Certifications	Album
1970	"The Best Thing You've Ever Done"	—	19	—	—	—	—	—	—	—	—		The Way We Were
1970	"On a Clear Day (You Can See Forever)"	—	—	—	—	—	—	—	—	—	—		On a Clear Day You Can See Forever: Original Soundtrack Recording
1970	"Stoney End"	6	2	7	66	—	5	29	—	— (Note: "Stoney End" did not enter the Dutch Top 40, but peaked at number 25 on the Tipparade chart.)	27		Stoney End
1971	"Time and Love"	51	3	48	—	—	—	25	—	—	—		Stoney End
1971	"Flim Flam Man"	82	7	69	—	—	62	17	—	—	—		Stoney End
1971	"Where You Lead"	40	3	40	72	—	44	23	—	—	—		Barbra Joan Streisand
1971	"Mother"	79	24	88	—	—	74	—	—	—	—		Barbra Joan Streisand
1971	"Space Captain"	— (Note: "Space Captain" did not enter the Billboard Hot 100, but peaked at number 5 on the Bubbling Under Hot 100 Singles chart.)	—	— (Note: "Space Captain" did not enter the Cash Box Top 100 Singles, but peaked at number 7 on the Cash Box Looking Ahead Singles chart.)	—	—	—	—	—	—	—		Barbra Joan Streisand
1972	"Sweet Inspiration/Where You Lead"	37	15	41	—	—	37	—	—	—	—		Live Concert at the Forum
1972	"Sing a Song/Make Your Own Kind of Music"	94	28	— (Note: "Sing a Song/Make Your Own Kind of Music" did not enter the Cash Box Top 100 Singles, but peaked at number 20 on the Cash Box Looking Ahead Singles chart.)	—	—	—	25	—	—	—		Live Concert at the Forum
1972	"Didn't We"	82	22	65	—	—	—	46	—	—	—		Live Concert at the Forum
1973	"If I Close My Eyes"	—	—	—	—	—	—	—	—	—	—		Non-album single
1973	"The Way We Were"	1	1	1	7	—	1	1	—	—	31	US: Platinum; AUS: Gold; UK: Silver	The Way We Were
1974	"All in Love Is Fair"	63	10	60	—	—	60	—	—	—	—		The Way We Were
1974	"Guava Jelly"	—	—	83	—	—	—	—	—	—	—		ButterFly
1975	"Jubilation"	—	—	—	—	—	—	—	—	—	—		ButterFly
1975	"How Lucky Can You Get"	—	27	—	—	—	—	19	—	—	—		Funny Lady: Original Soundtrack Recording
1975	"My Father's Song"	—	11	—	—	—	—	15	—	—	—		Lazy Afternoon
1975	"Shake Me, Wake Me (When It's Over)"	— (Note: "Shake Me, Wake Me (When It's Over)" did not enter the Billboard Hot 100, but peaked at number 14 on the Dance Club Songs chart.)	—	— (Note: "Shake Me, Wake Me (When It's Over)" did not enter the Cash Box Top 100 Singles, but peaked at number 4 on the Cash Box Looking Ahead Singles chart.)	—	—	—	—	—	—	—		Lazy Afternoon
1976	"Evergreen (Love Theme from A Star Is Born)"	1	1	1	5	27	1	1	4	18	3	US: Platinum; CAN: Gold; UK: Silver	A Star Is Born
1977	"My Heart Belongs to Me"	4	1	5	46	—	3	1	—	—	—		Superman
1978	"Songbird"	25	1	33	92	—	33	1	—	—	—		Songbird
1978	"Prisoner (Love Theme from Eyes of Laura Mars)"	21	48	35	—	—	48	28	—	—	—		Eyes of Laura Mars: Music from the Original Motion Picture Soundtrack
1978	"You Don't Bring Me Flowers" (with Neil Diamond)	1	3	1	4	17	1	1	4	14	5	US: Platinum; CAN: Gold; UK: Gold	Barbra Streisand's Greatest Hits Volume 2
1979	"Superman"	—	29	—	—	—	—	18	—	—	—		Barbra Streisand's Greatest Hits Volume 2
1979	"The Main Event/Fight"	3	2	3	21	—	5	1	—	—	—	US: Gold	The Main Event
1979	"No More Tears (Enough Is Enough)" (with Donna Summer)	1	7	1	8	16	2	6	7	20	3	US: Platinum; CAN: Gold; UK: Silver	Wet
1979	"Kiss Me in the Rain"	37	9	50	—	—	67	1	—	—	—		Wet
"—" denotes a title that did not chart, or was not released in that territory

=== 1980s ===
Year	Title	Peak chart positions										Certifications	Album
Year	Title	US	US AC	US Cash Box	AUS	BEL	CAN	CAN AC	IRE	NLD	UK	Certifications	Album
1980	"Woman in Love"	1	1	1	1	1	1	1	1	1	1	US: Platinum; AUS: Gold; UK: Gold	Guilty
1980	"Guilty" (with Barry Gibb)	3	5	8	37	9	13	32	21	12	34	US: Gold; UK: Silver	Guilty
1981	"What Kind of Fool" (with Barry Gibb)	10	1	10	—	—	17	—	—	—	—		Guilty
1981	"Promises"	48	8	48	—	—	—	5	—	—	—		Guilty
1981	"Comin' In and Out of Your Life"	11	2	9	84	—	24	1	—	19	66		Memories
1982	"Memory"	52	9	48	59	—	—	3	—	19	34		Memories
1983	"The Way He Makes Me Feel"	40	1	26	—	—	34	1	—	—	—		Yentl: Original Motion Picture Soundtrack
1984	"Papa, Can You Hear Me?"	—	26	—	—	—	—	14	—	—	—		Yentl: Original Motion Picture Soundtrack
1984	"Left in the Dark"	50	4	37	27	27	87	2	—	20	85		Emotion
1984	"Make No Mistake, He's Mine" (with Kim Carnes)	51	8	42	—	—	89	5	—	—	92		Emotion
1985	"Emotion"	79	14	79	—	—	97	18	—	—	—		Emotion
1985	"Somewhere"	43	5	50	—	—	72	2	—	—	88		The Broadway Album
1986	"Send In the Clowns"	—	25	—	—	—	—	2	—	—	—		The Broadway Album
1988	"Till I Loved You" (with Don Johnson)	25	3	26	34	3	22	—	9	4	16		Till I Loved You
1988	"All I Ask of You"	—	15	—	156	—	—	—	—	56	77		Till I Loved You
1989	"What Were We Thinking Of"	—	32	—	—	—	—	—	—	—	—		Till I Loved You
1989	"We're Not Makin' Love Anymore"	—	10	—	111	—	—	15	—	89	85		A Collection: Greatest Hits...and More
1989	"Someone That I Used to Love"	—	25	—	—	—	—	—	—	86	—		A Collection: Greatest Hits...and More
"—" denotes a title that did not chart, or was not released in that territory

=== 1990s ===
Year	Title	Peak chart positions										Certifications	Album
Year	Title	US	US AC	US Country	AUS	BEL	CAN	CAN AC	IRE	NLD	UK	Certifications	Album
1991	"Places That Belong to You"	—	43	—	152	—	—	34	29	—	17		The Prince of Tides: Original Motion Picture Soundtrack
1992	"For All We Know"	—	—	—	—	—	—	—	—	—	—		The Prince of Tides: Original Motion Picture Soundtrack
1993	"With One Look"	—	—	—	129	—	—	—	—	—	30		Back to Broadway
1993	"Children Will Listen"	—	—	—	—	—	—	—	—	—	—		Back to Broadway
1993	"Speak Low"	—	—	—	—	—	—	—	—	—	—		Back to Broadway
1994	"The Music of the Night" (with Michael Crawford)	—	—	—	—	—	—	—	—	—	54		Back to Broadway
1994	"As If We Never Said Goodbye"	—	—	—	—	—	—	—	—	—	20		Back to Broadway
1994	"Ordinary Miracles"	—	—	—	—	—	—	—	—	—	—		The Concert
1994	"Evergreen (Live)"	—	—	—	—	—	—	—	—	—	—		The Concert
1996	"I Finally Found Someone" (with Bryan Adams)	8	2	—	2	6	18	2	1	16	10	US: Gold; AUS: Gold; UK: Silver	The Mirror Has Two Faces: Music from the Motion Picture
1997	"Tell Him" (with Celine Dion)	— (Note: "Tell Him" was not eligible to chart on the Billboard Hot 100, but peaked at number 58 on the Radio Songs chart.)	5	—	9	3	12	1	2	1	3	AUS: Platinum; BEL: Platinum; NL: Platinum; UK: Gold	Higher Ground
1998	"If I Could"	—	—	—	—	—	—	—	—	—	—		Higher Ground
1998	"Higher Ground"	—	—	—	—	—	—	—	—	—	—		Higher Ground
1999	"I've Dreamed of You"	— (Note: "I've Dreamed of You" did not enter the Billboard Hot 100, but peaked at number 24 on the Hot Singles Sales chart.)	—	—	141	—	12	91	—	—	—		A Love Like Ours
1999	"If You Ever Leave Me" (with Vince Gill)	—	—	62	92	—	—	29	—	82	26		A Love Like Ours
"—" denotes a title that did not chart, or was not released in that territory

=== 2000s ===
Year	Title	Peak chart positions					Album
Year	Title	US AC	US Dance	HUN Radio	SCO	UK	Album
2001	"It Must Have Been the Mistletoe"	28	—	—	—	—	Christmas Memories
2002	"I Won't Be the One to Let Go" (with Barry Manilow)	—	—	—	—	—	Duets
2005	"Stranger in a Strange Land"	39	—	32	66	111	Guilty Pleasures
2005	"Night of My Life"	—	2	—	—	—	Guilty Pleasures
2005	"Come Tomorrow" (with Barry Gibb)	—	—	—	57	95	Guilty Pleasures
2005	"Above the Law" (with Barry Gibb)	—	—	—	—	—	Guilty Pleasures
2009	"In the Wee Small Hours of the Morning"	—	—	—	—	—	Love Is the Answer
"—" denotes a title that did not chart, or was not released in that territory

=== 2010s ===
Year	Title	Peak chart positions			Album
Year	Title	US Dance	AUS	HUN Singles	Album
2012	"I'll Be Home for Christmas"	—	—	9	Christmas Memories
2014	"It Had to Be You" (with Michael Bublé)	—	—	—	Partners
2014	"What Kind of Fool" (with John Legend)	—	—	—	Partners
2016	"Enough Is Enough 2017" (with Donna Summer)	3	—	—	Non-album single
2018	"Don't Lie to Me"	8	—	—	Walls
"—" denotes a title that did not chart, or was not released in that territory

=== 2020s ===
Year	Title	Peak chart positions	Album
Year	Title	UK Digital	Album
2024	"Love Will Survive"	75	Non-album single
2025	"The First Time Ever I Saw Your Face" (with Hozier)	—	The Secret of Life: Partners, Volume Two
2025	"My Valentine" (with Paul McCartney)	—	The Secret of Life: Partners, Volume Two

=== As featured artist ===
Year	Title	Peak chart positions		Album
Year	Title	US Classical Digital	US Holiday Digital	Album
1994	"I've Got a Crush on You" (with Frank Sinatra)	—	—	Duets
2006	"Smile" (with Tony Bennett)	—	—	Duets: An American Classic
2011	"Somewhere" (with Jackie Evancho)	—	—	Dream with Me
2013	"When You Wish Upon a Star" (with Mary J. Blige and Chris Botti)	—	10	A Mary Christmas
"—" denotes a title that did not chart, or was not released in that territory

== Music videos ==
Title	Year	Director(s)	Ref(s)
"My Heart Belongs to Me"	1977		
"Woman in Love"	1981		
"Memory"	1981	Jack Semmens	
"Left in the Dark"	1984	Jonathan Kaplan	
"Emotion"	1985	Richard Baskin, Streisand	
"Somewhere"	1985	William Friedkin	
"Hands Across America"	1986	Bob Giraldi	
"Till I Loved You"	1988		
"We're Not Making Love Anymore"	1989	Jim Shea	
"Places That Belong to You"	1991		
"For All We Know"	1991		
"I Finally Found Someone"	1996		
"Tell Him"	1997	Scott Lochmus	
"If You Ever Leave Me"	1999	Jim Shea	
"Wild is the Wind"	2003		
"I'm in the Mood for Love"	2003		
"Stranger in a Strange Land"	2005	Rick Walker	
"Above the Law"	2005	Rick Walker	
"Hideaway"	2005	Rick Walker	
"Letting Go"	2005	Rick Walker	
"We Are the World 25"	2010	Paul Haggis	
"I Think It's Going to Rain Today"	2012	Matt Amato	
"Don't Lie to Me"	2018	Barbra Streisand	

== Video releases ==
Year	Title	Certification	US chart
1986	My Name Is Barbra (home video)	US: Gold	4
1986	Color Me Barbra (home video)	US: Gold	3
1986	A Happening in Central Park (home video)		13
1986	Putting It Together: The Making of The Broadway Album (home video)	US: Gold	8
1988	One Voice (home video)		9
1994	Barbra: The Concert (home video)	US: 4× Platinum	1
2001	Timeless – Live in Concert (home video / DVD)	US: Platinum; AUS: 2× Platinum	1
2004	Barbra: The Concert Live at the MGM Grand (home video / DVD)	US: Platinum; AUS: Platinum	3
2005	Barbra Streisand: The Television Specials DVD Box Set	US: 5× Platinum	11
2009	Streisand: The Concerts DVD Box Set	US: 5× Platinum	1
2010	One Night Only Barbra Streisand and Quartet at The Village Vanguard	US: 5× Platinum; AUS: Gold	1
2013	Back to Brooklyn		1
