= The Essential Barbra Streisand =

Compilation album by Barbra Streisand
- Released: January 29, 2002
- Genre: Pop
- Length: 150:53
- Label: Columbia
- Producers: Barbra Streisand; Walter Afanasieff; Richard Baskin; Alan Bergman; Marilyn Bergman; Mike Berniker; Charles Calello; Bob Esty; David Foster; Albhy Galuten; Bob Gaudio; Barry Gibb; Jack Gold; Wally Gold; Rupert Holmes; Gary Klein; Jeffrey Lesser; Andrew Lloyd Webber; Tommy LiPuma; Peter Matz; Robert Mersey; Marty Paich; Richard Perry; Phil Ramone; Karl Richardson; William Ross; Nigel Wright

Barbra Streisand chronology
Christmas Memories (2001)	The Essential Barbra Streisand (2002)	Duets (2002)

The Essential Barbra Streisand (retitled The Ultimate Collection in some European countries) is the fifth greatest hits album by American singer Barbra Streisand, released on January 29, 2002, by Columbia Records. The compilation features 38 songs from Streisand's catalog, in addition to two previously unreleased tracks (covers of "Someday My Prince Will Come" and "You'll Never Walk Alone"). It includes material from 26 of the singer's albums and was described as a collection of, mainly, her pop songs. A reissued version of the compilation was distributed by Columbia and Legacy Recordings in 2008 and includes a bonus disc featuring nine additional songs from Streisand's discography.

Critically, the album was noted for being a comprehensive and complete view of her discography, unlike her previous greatest hits releases. It topped the charts in Ireland, Scotland, and the United Kingdom, and peaked at number 15 on the Billboard 200 in the United States. The Essential Barbra Streisand also reached the top ten in several countries and was included on four year-end lists. The album has since been certified Platinum in Australia, Europe, New Zealand, Spain, and the United States, and multi-platinum in the United Kingdom.

== Background and development ==
The Essential Barbra Streisand was released on January 29, 2002, by Columbia Records. A compilation of Streisand's "pop-oriented performances", the collection contains two discs featuring 38 songs from Streisand's discography. Representing 26 albums from her career, the first-recorded song included on The Essential Barbra Streisand is "A Sleepin' Bee" from The Barbra Streisand Album (1963), while the most recent track featured is "I've Dreamed of You" from A Love Like Ours (1999). In addition, Streisand included two previously unreleased tracks on the second disc, covers of "Someday My Prince Will Come" and "You'll Never Walk Alone". William Ruhlmann from AllMusic suggested that the former song was recorded during sessions for A Love Like Ours while the latter was meant for her twenty-seventh studio album, Higher Ground (1997). In some European countries, the album was released under the title The Ultimate Collection with an identical track listing.

The Essential Barbra Streisand was reissued on September 30, 2008, through a co-partnership between Columbia Records and Legacy Recordings. The new version featured a bonus third disc with seven more songs from Streisand's back-catalog and two live renditions.

== Critical reception ==
Professional ratings
Review scores
Source	Rating
AllMusic	5/5 stars

The Essential Barbra Streisand was given a perfect five-star rating by AllMusic's William Ruhlmann. He felt that Streisand's discography had not been detailed well on her previous compilations and considered The Essential Barbra Streisand to be the best choice for fans not willing to purchase the expensive box set Just for the Record... (1992). Considering its comprehensiveness, Ruhlmann praised the album's inclusion of her eleven top ten hits and nearly all of her top 40 hits. Tom Santopietro, author of The Importance of Being Barbra: The Brilliant, Tumultuous Career of Barbra Streisand, was disappointed by Streisand's decision to release two greatest hits albums in the same year (the other being Duets). Describing her action as "cynical", he wrote: "At this point, even the most die-hard Streisand fan could be forgiven for expressing frustration at yet another release of 'People' and 'The Way We Were'." However, he praised the inclusion of "Someday My Prince Will Come" and "You'll Never Walk Alone", calling them both "extraordinary" cover tracks. In addition to The Barbra Streisand Album and Stoney End (1971), Phyllis Fulford and Michael Miller, authors of the 2003 book The Complete Idiot's Guide to Singing, listed The Essential Barbra Streisand as one of the singer's "CDs that best represent [her] more pop-oriented performances".

== Commercial performance ==
The Essential Barbra Streisand entered the Billboard 200 at number 15, its peak position, during the week of February 16, 2002. It was the chart's second highest entry of the week, just behind the soundtrack to the 2002 film State Property, which debuted at number 14. It spent a total of nine weeks on the Billboard 200. On March 15, 2002, it was certified Gold as a multi-disc package by Recording Industry Association of America (RIAA) for physical shipments of 250,000 copies; its certification was then upgraded to Platinum, signifying shipments of 500,000 copies, on October 17, 2003. As of June 22, 2007, The Essential Barbra Streisand has sold 506,000 copies in the United States. Elsewhere in North America, it debuted in Canada at number 73 according to the chart published by Nielsen SoundScan.

In Europe, The Essential Barbra Streisand topped the charts in several countries and has been certified Platinum by the International Federation of the Phonographic Industry for sales upwards of one million. According to the Official Charts Company, it topped the charts in both Scotland and the United Kingdom. In the latter country, the compilation spent 49 weeks charting and was ranked on the year-end sales charts for both 2002 and 2003 at positions 36 and 192, respectively. It was later certified platinum by the British Phonographic Industry for shipments of 300,000 copies. In the same continent, The Essential Barbra Streisand (or The Ultimate Collection in some European territories) topped the Irish Albums Chart, and reached the top ten in Belgium, Denmark, Finland, Germany, Greece, the Netherlands, Norway, and Sweden. In Oceania, the album peaked in Australia and New Zealand at numbers 5 and 3, respectively. Both countries issued the compilation double Platinum and platinum respectively.

When the album was reissued in 2007 and 2008 in several European countries, it debuted on the album charts in Austria, Italy, and Spain. In the first country, it reached the top twenty and peaked at number 11, and in Italy it peaked at number 75. In Spain, the album originally peaked at number 14 but reentered in 2013 at number 85.

== Track listing ==
The Essential Barbra Streisand – Standard edition (disc one)
No.	Title	Writer(s)	Producer(s)	Length
1.	"A Sleepin' Bee" (from The Barbra Streisand Album, 1963)	Harold Arlen; Truman Capote	Mike Berniker	4:22
2.	"Cry Me a River" (from The Barbra Streisand Album)	Arthur Hamilton	Berniker	3:37
3.	"I Stayed Too Long at the Fair" (from The Second Barbra Streisand Album, 1963)	Billy Barnes	Berniker	4:20
4.	"Lover, Come Back to Me" (from The Second Barbra Streisand Album)	Sigmund Romberg; Oscar Hammerstein II	Berniker	2:17
5.	"People" (from People, 1964)	Jule Styne; Bob Merrill	Berniker	3:40
6.	"My Man" (from My Name Is Barbra, 1965)	Maurice Yvain; Channing Pollock; Albert Willemetz; Jacques Charles	Robert Mersey	2:17
7.	"Second Hand Rose" (from My Name Is Barbra, Two..., 1965)	James F. Hanley; Grant Clarke	Mersey	2:09
8.	"He Touched Me" (from My Name Is Barbra, Two...)	Milton Schafer; Ira Levin	Mersey	3:10
9.	"Don't Rain on My Parade" (from Funny Girl, 1968)	Styne; Merrill	Jack Gold	2:45
10.	"Happy Days Are Here Again" (live; from A Happening in Central Park, 1968)	Milton Ager; Jack Yellen	J. Gold	3:14
11.	"On a Clear Day (You Can See Forever)" (from On a Clear Day You Can See Forever, 1970)	Burton Lane; Alan Jay Lerner	Wally Gold	2:11
12.	"Stoney End" (from Stoney End, 1971)	Laura Nyro	Richard Perry	2:59
13.	"Since I Fell for You" (from Barbra Joan Streisand, 1971)	Buddy Johnson	Perry	3:25
14.	"What Are You Doing the Rest of Your Life?" (from The Way We Were, 1974)	Alan Bergman; Marilyn Bergman; Michel Legrand	W. Gold	3:20
15.	"The Way We Were" (from The Way We Were)	A. Bergman; M. Bergman; Marvin Hamlisch	Marty Paich	3:30
16.	"All in Love Is Fair" (from The Way We Were)	Stevie Wonder	Tommy LiPuma	3:50
17.	"Lazy Afternoon" (from Lazy Afternoon, 1975)	John La Touche; Jerome Moross	Jeffrey Lesser; Rupert Holmes	3:50
18.	"Evergreen" (from A Star Is Born, 1976)	Barbra Streisand; Paul Williams	Streisand; Phil Ramone	3:05
19.	"My Heart Belongs to Me" (from Superman, 1977)	Alan Gordon	Gary Klein; Charlie Calello	3:21
20.	"You Don't Bring Me Flowers" (with Neil Diamond; from Barbra Streisand's Greatest Hits Volume 2, 1978)	A. Bergman; M. Bergman; Neil Diamond	Bob Gaudio	3:24
21.	"The Main Event/Fight" (from The Main Event, 1979)	Paul Jabara; Bruce Roberts; Bob Esty	Esty	4:55
22.	"No More Tears (Enough Is Enough)" (with Donna Summer; from Wet, 1979)	Jabara; Roberts	Klein	4:43
Total length:				74:24

The Essential Barbra Streisand – Standard edition (disc two)
No.	Title	Writer(s)	Producer(s)	Length
1.	"Woman in Love" (from Guilty, 1980)	Barry Gibb; Robin Gibb	B. Gibb; Albhy Galuten; Karl Richardson	3:51
2.	"Guilty" (with Barry Gibb; from Guilty)	B. Gibb; R. Gibb; Maurice Gibb	B. Gibb; Galuten; Richardson	4:24
3.	"Comin' In and Out of Your Life" (from Memories, 1981)	Richard Parker; Bobby Whiteside	Andrew Lloyd Webber	4:09
4.	"Memory" (from Memories)	Lloyd Webber; T. S. Eliot; Trevor Nunn	Lloyd Webber	3:55
5.	"Papa, Can You Hear Me?" (from Yentl, 1983)	A. Bergman; M. Bergman; Legrand	Streisand; A. Bergman; M. Bergman	3:29
6.	"A Piece of Sky" (from Yentl)	A. Bergman; M. Bergman; Legrand	Streisand; A. Bergman; M. Bergman	4:20
7.	"Putting It Together" (from The Broadway Album, 1985)	Stephen Sondheim	Streisand; Peter Matz	4:21
8.	"Not While I'm Around" (from The Broadway Album)	Sondheim	Richard Baskin	3:29
9.	"Send in the Clowns" (from The Broadway Album)	Sondheim	Streisand	4:43
10.	"Somewhere" (from The Broadway Album)	Leonard Bernstein; Sondheim	David Foster	4:56
11.	"All I Ask of You" (from Till I Loved You, 1988)	Lloyd Webber; Charles Hart; Richard Stilgoe	Ramone	4:02
12.	"Children Will Listen" (from Back to Broadway, 1993)	Sondheim	Streisand	4:09
13.	"As If We Never Said Goodbye" (from Back to Broadway)	Lloyd Webber; Don Black; Christopher Hampton; Amy Powers	Streisand; Lloyd Webber; Nigel Wright	4:44
14.	"I Finally Found Someone" (with Bryan Adams; from The Mirror Has Two Faces, 1996)	Streisand; Hamlisch; R.J. Lange; Bryan Adams	Foster	3:41
15.	"Tell Him" (with Celine Dion; from Higher Ground, 1997)	Foster; Linda Thompson; Walter Afanasieff	Foster; Afanasieff	4:51
16.	"I've Dreamed of You" (from A Love Like Ours, 1999)	Rolf Lovland; Ann Hampton Callaway	Streisand	4:44
17.	"Someday My Prince Will Come"	Larry Morey; Frank Churchill	Streisand; William Ross	4:06
18.	"You'll Never Walk Alone"	Richard Rodgers; Hammerstein	Streisand	4:35
Total length:				76:29

The Essential Barbra Streisand – 2008 reissued edition (bonus disc)
No.	Title	Writer(s)	Producer(s)	Length
1.	"Letting Go" (from Guilty Pleasures, 2005)	George Bitzer; B. Gibb	B. Gibb; John Merchant	3:48
2.	"Love Like Ours" (from A Love Like Ours)	Dave Grusin; A. Bergman; M. Bergman	Streisand	3:56
3.	"At the Same Time" (from Higher Ground)	Callaway	Streisand	4:16
4.	"By the Way" (from Lazy Afternoon)	Streisand; Holmes	Lesser; Holmes	2:55
5.	"Unusual Way" (live; from Live in Concert 2006, 2007)	Maury Yeston	Streisand; Jay Landers	3:31
6.	"Evergreen" (live; from The Concert, 1994)	Streisand; Williams	Baskin	3:07
7.	"Wild Is the Wind" (from The Movie Album, 2003)	Dimitri Tiomkin; Ned Washington	Streisand	4:10
8.	"On My Way to You" (from Till I Loved You)	A. Bergman; M. Bergman; Legrand	Streisand	3:43
9.	"After the Rain" (from Wet)	A. Bergman; M. Bergman; Legrand	Klein	3:41
Total length:				33:07

== Personnel ==
Personnel adapted from AllMusic.

- Barbra Streisand – arranger, composer, executive producer, primary artist, producer
- Walter Afanasieff – arranger, composer, producer
- Milton Ager – composer
- Harold Arlen – composer
- Billy Barnes – composer
- Richard Baskin – producer
- Alan Bergman – composer, producer
- Marilyn Bergman – composer, producer
- Michael Berniker – producer
- Leonard Bernstein – composer
- Don Black – composer
- David Caddick – conductor
- Charles Calello – arranger, producer
- Ann Hampton Callaway – composer
- John Cameron – orchestration
- Truman Capote – composer
- Jacques Charles – composer
- Frank Churchill – composer
- Grant Clarke – composer
- Don Costa – arranger, conductor
- David Cullen – orchestration
- Nick DeCaro – arranger
- Neil Diamond – composer, guest artist, performer
- Céline Dion – guest artist, performer
- Bob Esty – arranger, composer, conductor, producer
- Peter Fletcher – project manager
- David Foster – arranger, composer, producer
- Ian Freebairn-Smith – arranger
- Albhy Galuten – producer
- Bob Gaudio – producer
- Barry Gibb – composer, guest artist, performer, producer
- Maurice Gibb – composer
- Robin Gibb – composer
- Jack Gold – producer
- Wally Gold – producer
- Alan Gordon – composer
- Arthur Hamilton – composer
- Marvin Hamlisch – composer
- Oscar Hammerstein II – composer
- Christopher Hampton – composer
- James F. Hanley – composer
- Charles Hart – composer
- Jack Hayes – string arrangements
- Rupert Holmes – arranger, conductor, producer
- Paul Jabara – composer, vocal arrangements
- Buddy Johnson – composer
- Gary Klein – producer
- Charles Koppelman – executive producer
- Jay Landers – executive producer
- Burton Lane – composer
- Robert John "Mutt" Lange – arranger, composer
- Michel Legrand – arranger, composer, conductor, producer
- Alan Jay Lerner – composer
- Jeffrey Lesser – producer
- Ira Levin – composer
- Alan Lindgren – arranger, conductor
- Mort Lindsey – arranger, conductor
- Tommy LiPuma – producer
- Andrew Lloyd Webber – composer, orchestration, producer
- Rolf Løvland – composer
- Jeremy Lubbock – conductor, orchestration
- Stephen Marcussen – mastering
- Greg Mathieson – arranger, conductor
- Peter Matz – arranger, conductor, executive producer, orchestration, producer
- Bob Merrill – composer
- Robert Mersey – producer
- Larry Morey – composer
- Jürg Morgenthaler – composer
- Jerome Moross – composer
- Trevor Nunn – composer
- Laura Nyro – composer
- Gene Page – arranger
- Marty Paich – arranger, producer
- Richard Parker – composer
- Richard Perry – producer
- Channing Pollack – composer
- Phil Ramone – producer
- Gabrielle Raumberger – art direction
- Karl Richardson – producer
- Nelson Riddle – arranger, conductor
- Bruce Roberts – composer, vocal arrangements
- Richard Rodgers – composer
- Sigmund Romberg – composer
- William Ross – arranger, conductor, orchestral arrangements, producer
- Milton Schafer – composer
- Walter Scharf – arranger, conductor
- Cliff Singontiko – design
- Stephen Sondheim – composer
- Richard Stilgoe – composer
- Jule Styne – composer
- Donna Summer – guest artist, performer
- Linda Thompson-Jenner – composer
- Jonathan Tunick – arranger, conductor
- Luther Waters – vocal arrangements
- Bobby Whiteside – composer
- Stewart Whitmore – digital editing
- Albert Willemetz – composer
- Patrick Williams – arranger, conductor
- Paul Williams – composer
- Stevie Wonder – composer
- Nigel Wright – producer
- Jack Yellen – composer
- Maurice Yvain – composer

== Charts ==
=== Weekly charts ===
Weekly chart performance for The Essential Barbra Streisand
Chart (2002–2013)	Peak position
Australian Albums (ARIA)	5
Austrian Albums (Ö3 Austria)	11
Austrian Albums (Ö3 Austria) from The Ultimate Collection	14
Belgian Albums (Ultratop Flanders)	12
Belgian Albums (Ultratop Wallonia)	8
Canadian Albums Chart (Nielsen)	73
Danish Albums (Hitlisten)	5
Dutch Albums (Album Top 100)	6
Dutch Albums (Album Top 100) from The Ultimate Collection	4
European Albums (Music & Media)	6
Finnish Albums (Suomen virallinen lista)	3
German Albums (Offizielle Top 100) from The Ultimate Collection	9
Greek Albums (IFPI)	5
Hungarian Albums (MAHASZ)	7
Irish Albums (IRMA)	1
Italian Albums (FIMI)	75
New Zealand Albums (RMNZ)	3
Norwegian Albums (VG-lista)	4
Scottish Albums (Official Charts)	1
Spanish Albums (PROMUSICAE)	14
Swedish Albums (Sverigetopplistan)	4
Swiss Albums (Schweizer Hitparade) from The Ultimate Collection	60
UK Albums (Official Charts)	1
US Billboard 200	15

=== Year-end charts ===
2002 year-end chart performance for The Essential Barbra Streisand
Chart (2002)	Position
Australian Albums (ARIA)	96
Belgian Albums (Ultratop Wallonia)	62
German Albums (Offizielle Top 100) from The Ultimate Collection	96
New Zealand Albums (RMNZ)	37
Swedish Albums (Sverigetopplistan)	76
UK Albums (OCC)	36

2003 year-end chart performance for The Essential Barbra Streisand
Chart (2003)	Position
UK Albums (OCC)	192

2007 year-end chart performance for The Essential Barbra Streisand
Chart (2007)	Position
UK Albums (OCC)	193

== Certifications and sales ==
Certifications and sales for The Essential Barbra Streisand
Region	Certification	Certified units/sales
Australia (ARIA)	2× Platinum	140,000^{‡}
Finland (Musiikkituottajat)	Gold	15,840
France (SNEP)	Gold	100,000^{*}
New Zealand (RMNZ)	Platinum	15,000^{^}
Spain (Promusicae)	Platinum	100,000^{^}
Sweden (GLF)	Gold	30,000^{^}
United Kingdom (BPI)	Platinum	300,000^{^}
United States (RIAA)	Platinum	506,000
Summaries
Europe (IFPI)	Platinum	1,000,000^{*}
^{*} Sales figures based on certification alone.^{^} Shipments figures based on certification alone.^{‡} Sales+streaming figures based on certification alone.

== Release history ==
Release history and formats for The Essential Barbra Streisand
Region	Date	Format(s)	Edition	Label	Ref.
Various	January 29, 2002	CD	Standard	Columbia	
United States	September 30, 2008	CD	Deluxe	Columbia; Legacy	

== See also ==
- List of UK Albums Chart number ones of the 2000s
