= The Ultimate Collection (2010 Barbra Streisand album) =

Compilation album by Barbra Streisand
- Released: March 29, 2010
- Recorded: 1964–2009
- Genre: Vocal
- Labels: Legacy, Columbia

Barbra Streisand chronology
Love Is the Answer (2009)	The Ultimate Collection (2010)	What Matters Most (2011)

Professional ratings
Review scores
Source	Rating
AllMusic	3.5/5 stars
Daily Express	5/5 stars
Contactmusic.com	4.5/5 stars

The Ultimate Collection is a compilation album released in 2010 by American singer Barbra Streisand.

The album peaked at #8 in the United Kingdom, with sales of 24,736.

The Ultimate Collection was the 51st best-selling album of 2011 in the UK, with sales of 231,000. The BPI certified the album Platinum on December 20, 2013.

In Canada the album peaked at number 24 and had sold 23,357 copies as of March 2013. It was certified Gold in Hungary.

== Track listing ==
No.	Title	Writer(s)	Producer(s)	Length
1.	"Woman in Love" (from Guilty, 1980)	Barry Gibb; Robin Gibb	Barry Gibb; Albhy Galuten; Karl Richardson	3:52
2.	"Evergreen" (from A Star Is Born (soundtrack), 1976)	Barbra Streisand; Paul Williams	Streisand; Phil Ramone	3:06
3.	"The Way We Were" (from The Way We Were, 1974)	Alan Bergman; Marilyn Bergman; Marvin Hamlisch	Marty Paich	3:31
4.	"You Don't Bring Me Flowers" (Duet with Neil Diamond, from Greatest Hits Volume 2, 1978)	Alan Bergman; Marilyn Bergman; Neil Diamond	Mike Berniker	3:23
5.	"Guilty" (Duet with Barry Gibb, from Guilty, 1980)	Barry Gibb; Robin Gibb; Maurice Gibb	Barry Gibb; Galuten; Richardson	4:24
6.	"No More Tears (Enough Is Enough)" (Duet with Donna Summer, from Wet, 1979)	Paul Jabara; Bruce Roberts	Gary Klein	4:44
7.	"Don't Rain on My Parade" (from Funny Girl (soundtrack), 1968)	Jule Styne; Bob Merrill	Jack Gold	2:45
8.	"Memory" (from Memories, 1981)	Andrew Lloyd Webber; T. S. Eliot; Trevor Nunn	Webber	3:53
9.	"Papa, Can You Hear Me?" (from Yentl (soundtrack), 1983)	Alan Bergman; Marilyn Bergman; Michel Legrand	Streisand; Alan Bergman; Marilyn Bergman	3:31
10.	"As If We Never Said Goodbye" (from Back to Broadway, 1993)	Andrew Lloyd Webber	Streisand	4:43
11.	"Tell Him" (Duet with Celine Dion, from Higher Ground, 1997)	David Foster; Linda Thompson; Walter Afanasieff	Foster; Afanasieff	4:51
12.	"Stranger in a Strange Land" (from Guilty Pleasures, 2005)	Barry Gibb; Ashley Gibb; Stephen Gibb	Barry Gibb; John Merchant	4:50
13.	"I've Dreamed of You" (from A Love Like Ours, 1999)	Rolf Lovland; Ann Hampton Callaway	Streisand	4:52
14.	"Send in the Clowns" (from The Broadway Album, 1985)	Sondheim	Streisand	4:42
15.	"People" (from People, 1964)	Jule Styne; Bob Merrill	Streisand	3:41
16.	"Smile" (from The Movie Album, 2003)	Charlie Chaplin; John Turner; Geoffrey Parsons	Tommy LiPuma	4:16
17.	"In the Wee Small Hours of the Morning" (from Love Is the Answer, 2009)	Bob Hilliard; David Mann	Diana Krall	4:02
18.	"Somewhere" (from The Broadway Album, 1985)	Leonard Bernstein; Sondheim	Foster	4:46

== Charts ==
=== Weekly charts ===
Weekly chart performance for The Ultimate Collection
Chart (2010)	Peak position
Australian Albums (ARIA)	58
Canadian Albums (Billboard)	23
Dutch Albums (Album Top 100)	32
Irish Albums (IRMA)	28
Mexican Albums (Top 100 Mexico)	69
New Zealand Albums (RMNZ)	11
Spanish Albums (Promusicae)	73
Swiss Albums (Schweizer Hitparade)	81
UK Albums (Official Charts)	8

=== Year-end charts ===
Year-end chart performance for The Ultimate Collection
Chart (2010)	Position
UK Albums (OCC)	51

== Certifications ==
Region	Certification	Certified units/sales
Hungary (MAHASZ)	Gold	3,000^{^}
United Kingdom (BPI)	Platinum	300,000^{*}
^{*} Sales figures based on certification alone.^{^} Shipments figures based on certification alone.
