= Duets (Barbra Streisand album) =

Compilation album by Barbra Streisand
- Released: November 26, 2002
- Length: 78:06
- Label: Columbia
- Producers: Barbra Streisand; Walter Afanasieff; Kim Carnes; Bill Cuomo; Martin Erlichman; David Foster; Albhy Galuten; Bob Gaudio; Barry Gibb; Gary Klein; Richard Marx; Richard Perry; Phil Ramone; Karl Richardson; Thomas Z. Shepard

Barbra Streisand chronology
The Essential Barbra Streisand (2002)	Duets (2002)	The Movie Album (2003)

Singles from Duets
- 1. "I Won't Be the One to Let Go" Released: November 4, 2002

Duets is a compilation album by American singer Barbra Streisand, released on November 26, 2002, by Columbia Records. The collection features nineteen duets from Streisand's career, including two newly recorded ones: "I Won't Be the One to Let Go" with Barry Manilow and "All I Know of Love" with Josh Groban. The Manilow duet was released as the album's lead single on November 4, 2002, as a streaming-only exclusive for AOL Music website members.

Streisand and her manager Jay Landers were executive producers for the compilation. Music critics highlighted the album's duets with Ray Charles, Judy Garland, and Frank Sinatra. Commercially, the album peaked within the top ten of record charts in Denmark and the Netherlands; it also entered the US Billboard 200 at number 38 and became certified Gold by the Recording Industry Association of America (RIAA) for shipments of 500,000 copies. Duets has gone on to sell 1.5 million records worldwide.

== Development and songs ==
Streisand and Columbia Records released two compilation albums in 2002: the first being The Essential Barbra Streisand, a greatest hits collection largely consisting of the singer's top-ten and top-forty hits, followed by Duets, a compilation of nineteen duets from her music catalog.

Fourteen out of the album's nineteen tracks were originally featured on previous Streisand studio albums. The singer included three songs originally performed for other artist's projects: "I've Got a Crush on You" with Frank Sinatra initially appeared on his 1993 Duets album; her rendition of "Ding-Dong! The Witch Is Dead" with Harold Arlen first appeared on the 1966 studio album Harold Sings Arlen (With Friend); her medley of "Get Happy / Happy Days Are Here Again" with Judy Garland was originally performed live on The Judy Garland Show in 1963.

While eighteen of the album's songs are duets with other musicians, Streisand's medley of "One Less Bell to Answer / A House Is Not a Home" is a duet with herself, first released on the 1971 album Barbra Joan Streisand.

Streisand recorded two new tracks for the album: "I Won't Be the One to Let Go" with Barry Manilow and "All I Know of Love" with Josh Groban. The former track was written by Richard Marx and Manilow, while the latter was written by David Foster and Linda Thompson.

"I Won't Be the One to Let Go" was released as the album's lead and only single on November 4, 2002, as an exclusive download for AOL Music website members. Although the track was not released commercially, "I Won't Be the One to Let Go" was distributed as a promotional CD single on January 6, 2003. With the release handled by Columbia Records, the CD was sent exclusively to United States radio stations and includes the "Radio Version Edit" and "Radio Version" releases of the song.

Sony Music Entertainment reissued the compilation in South American countries with different cover art, but identical track listing, under the title Star Collection in 2013.

== Critical reception ==
Professional ratings
Review scores
Source	Rating
AllMusic	3/5 stars
BBC Music	(Favorable)

AllMusic's William Ruhlmann awarded Duets three out of his five stars during his album review. He wrote that the best performances on the album are her duets with Sinatra, Garland, and Ray Charles. However, Ruhlmann criticized Streisand's role as a duet partner: "Her unsuitability to the duet format is repeatedly evidenced, as she seems virtually incapable of shutting up when her partner is trying to take a solo, invariably humming in the background to draw attention back to herself." Tom Santopietro, author of The Importance of Being Barbra: The Brilliant, Tumultuous Career of Barbra Streisand, was disappointed by Streisand's decision to release two greatest hits albums in the same year. Nonetheless, he considered the medley inclusion of "One Less Bell to Answer" and "A House Is Not a Home" to be the "standout cut" on Duets. Morag Reavley from BBC Music highlighted the album's array of genres and wrote: "Even the most faithful Streisand acolyte must be delighted by the range of songs and singers assembled." She also enjoyed the inclusion of "I Won't Be the One to Let Go" and "All I Know of Love", writing that the latter track "shows that Barbra can still hold her own".

== Commercial performance ==
Duets entered and peaked on the US Billboard 200 at number 38, during the week of December 14, 2002. It was the chart's eleventh highest debut and would go on to spend fourteen weeks on the listing. On January 9, 2003, it was certified Gold by the Recording Industry Association of America (RIAA) for physical shipments of 500,000 copies, and during the year-end Billboard 200 chart in 2003, the compilation was listed at number 176. In Oceania, the album peaked in Australia and New Zealand at numbers 13 and 11, respectively. In the two aforementioned countries, it received a Gold certification by the Australian Recording Industry Association for shipments of 35,000 copies and a Platinum certification by Recorded Music NZ for shipments of 15,000 copies.

The album entered several record charts across Europe as well. According to the Official Charts Company, it peaked at numbers 39 and 30, in Scotland and the United Kingdom, respectively. In the latter country, the compilation spent 6 weeks charting during 2002 and was ranked on the year-end sales charts at position 89. In Denmark and the Netherlands, Duets peaked within the top ten at numbers 10 and 9, respectively. The album reached number 26 in Spain and received a Gold certification by PROMUSICAE for shipments of 50,000 copies. Its lowest peak positions were achieved in France, Germany, and Switzerland, where the compilation peaked at numbers 44, 53, and 88, respectively. The album has sold over 1.5 million copies worldwide.

== Track listing ==
Duets – Standard edition
No.	Title	Writer(s)	Producer(s)	Length
1.	"I Won't Be the One to Let Go" (with Barry Manilow)	Barry Manilow; Richard Marx	Marx; Walter Afanasieff	4:41
2.	"Guilty" (with Barry Gibb) (from Guilty, 1980)	Barry Gibb; Robin Gibb; Maurice Gibb	B. Gibb; Albhy Galuten; Karl Richardson	4:25
3.	"You Don't Bring Me Flowers" (with Neil Diamond) (from Barbra Streisand's Greatest Hits Volume 2, 1978)	Alan Bergman; Marilyn Bergman; Neil Diamond	Bob Gaudio	3:25
4.	"I Finally Found Someone" (with Bryan Adams) (from The Mirror Has Two Faces, 1996)	Barbra Streisand; Marvin Hamlisch; R.J. Lange; Bryan Adams	David Foster	3:43
5.	"Cryin' Time" (with Ray Charles) (from Barbra Streisand...and Other Musical Instruments, 1973)	Buck Owens	Martin Erlichman	2:18
6.	"I've Got a Crush on You" (with Frank Sinatra)	George Gershwin; Ira Gershwin	Foster; Phil Ramone	3:23
7.	"Tell Him" (with Celine Dion) (from Higher Ground, 1997)	Foster; Linda Thompson; Afanasieff	Foster; Afanasieff	4:53
8.	"No More Tears (Enough Is Enough)" (with Donna Summer) (from Wet, 1979)	Paul Jabara; Bruce Roberts	Gary Klein	4:43
9.	"What Kind of Fool" (with Barry Gibb) (from Guilty)	B. Gibb; Galuten	B. Gibb; Galuten; Richardson	4:07
10.	"I Have a Love / One Hand, One Heart" (with Johnny Mathis) (from Back to Broadway, 1993)	Leonard Bernstein; Stephen Sondheim	Foster	4:45
11.	"One Less Bell to Answer / A House Is Not a Home" (from Barbra Joan Streisand, 1971)	Burt Bacharach; Hal David	Richard Perry	6:32
12.	"Lost Inside of You" (with Kris Kristofferson) (from A Star Is Born, 1976)	Leon Russell; Streisand	Ramone; Streisand	2:55
13.	"Till I Loved You" (with Don Johnson) (from Till I Loved You, 1988)	Maury Yeston	Ramone	5:04
14.	"Make No Mistake, He's Mine" (with Kim Carnes) (from Emotion, 1984)	Kim Carnes	Carnes; Bill Cuomo	4:11
15.	"If You Ever Leave Me" (with Vince Gill) (from A Love Like Ours, 1999)	Marx	Foster; Marx	4:38
16.	"The Music of the Night" (with Michael Crawford) (from Back to Broadway)	Andrew Lloyd Webber; Charles Hart; Richard Stilgoe	Foster	5:38
17.	"Ding-Dong! The Witch Is Dead" (with Harold Arlen)	Harold Arlen; E.Y. Harburg	Thomas Z. Shepard	1:54
18.	"Get Happy / Happy Days Are Here Again" (with Judy Garland)	Arlen; Ted Koehler; Jack Yellen; Milton Ager	Mort Lindsey^{[a]}	2:22
19.	"All I Know of Love" (with Josh Groban)	Foster; Thompson; Alberto Testa; Tony Renis	Foster	4:29
Total length:				78:06

Duets EP – Promotional sampler edition
No.	Title	Length
1.	"I Won't Be the One to Let Go" (with Barry Manilow)	4:41
2.	"Guilty" (with Barry Gibb)	4:25
3.	"I Finally Found Someone" (with Bryan Adams)	3:43
4.	"I've Got a Crush on You" (with Frank Sinatra)	3:23
Total length:		16:12

Notes

- ^{^a} Mort Lindsey is credited as the track's musical director; no producer is listed

== Charts ==
=== Weekly charts ===
Chart (2002–2010)	Peak position
Australian Albums (ARIA)	13
Belgian Albums (Ultratop Flanders)	36
Danish Albums (Hitlisten)	10
Dutch Albums (Album Top 100)	9
European Albums (Music & Media)	79
French Albums (SNEP)	44
German Albums (Offizielle Top 100)	53
Hungarian Albums (MAHASZ)	30
New Zealand Albums (RMNZ)	11
Scottish Albums (Official Charts)	39
Spanish Albums (PROMUSICAE)	26
Swiss Albums (Schweizer Hitparade)	88
UK Albums (Official Charts)	30
US Billboard 200	38

=== Year-end charts ===
Chart (2002)	Position
UK Albums (OCC)	89

Chart (2003)	Position
Australian Albums (ARIA)	63
Dutch Albums (MegaCharts)	65
US Billboard 200	176

== Certifications and sales ==
Region	Certification	Certified units/sales
Australia (ARIA)	Platinum	70,000^{^}
New Zealand (RMNZ)	Platinum	15,000^{^}
Spain (Promusicae)	Gold	50,000^{^}
United Kingdom (BPI)	Gold	100,000^{^}
United States (RIAA)	Gold	561,000
Summaries
Worldwide	—	1,500,000
^{^} Shipments figures based on certification alone.

== Bibliography ==
- Santopietro, Tom (April 1, 2007). The Importance of Being Barbra: The Brilliant, Tumultuous Career of Barbra Streisand. Macmillan. ISBN 978-1429908535.
