= If You Ever Leave Me (Barbra Streisand and Vince Gill song) =

Single by Barbra Streisand (duet with Vince Gill)

from the album A Love Like Ours
- Released: October 18, 1999 (UK)
- Recorded: 1998
- Genre: Easy listening
- Length: 4:38
- Label: Columbia
- Songwriter: Richard Marx
- Producers: David Foster; Richard Marx

Barbra Streisand singles chronology
| "I've Dreamed of You" (1999) | "If You Ever Leave Me" (1999) | "I Won't Be the One to Let Go" (2002) |

Vince Gill singles chronology
| "Don't Come Cryin' to Me" (1999) | "If You Ever Leave Me" (1999) | "Let's Make Sure We Kiss Goodbye" (1999) |

Music video
- "If You Ever Leave Me" on YouTube

"If You Ever Leave Me" is a vocal duet between American singers Barbra Streisand and Vince Gill. The song was written by Richard Marx, and produced by Marx and David Foster. It first appeared as a song on Streisand's twenty-eighth studio album, A Love Like Ours (1999), and was released as an international CD single that included three additional tracks, two of which were recorded during the A Love Like Ours sessions but were not included on the album. The song later was included on Streisand's Duets album, released in 2002.

== Critical reception ==
The song was well received among music critics. J.D. Considine from The Baltimore Sun described it as "pop-oriented fare", that "offers an impressive emotional depth." Chuck Taylor from Billboard declared it as a "luscious power ballad", noting that "it's hard to imagine a better combination of mature voices than that on this tantalizing song about needing to spend every minute with the one you love". He also felt that "thanks to silken production from Marx and David Foster, this one ranks up there with classics like 'Comin' In And Out Of Your Life' and 'Woman In Love'". An editor from Drogheda Independent commented, "The it Vince Gill meets the technical precision of Barbra Streisand. Magic. Two singers from very different genres come together for the duet of the year." The editor concluded, that "this is a beautiful love song that gets better the more you play it." People Magazine stated in their review of A Love Like Ours, that songs like "If You Ever Leave Me" "stand out simply because they don't drip with sentimentality and because Streisand allows a bit of blues to creep into her vocals."

== Chart performance ==
"If You Ever Leave Me" was released to country radio and peaked at number 62 on the US Billboard Hot Country Singles & Tracks chart. On December 5, 1999, its accompanying music video became the third most played video on CMT. It also peaked at number 26 in the UK and number 92 in Australia.

== Production ==
- Producers and arrangers: David Foster and Richard Marx
- Orchestra arranger and conductor: William Ross (composer)
- Engineer: Felipe Elgueta and Humberto Gatica
- Mixer: Mick Guzauski
- Mastering: Vlado Meller at Sony Music Studios, Santa Monica, CA
- Executive Producers: Barbra Streisand and Jay Landers

== Track listing ==
| No. | Title | Writer(s) | Length |
|---|---|---|---|
| 1. | "If You Ever Leave Me" | Richard Marx | 4:36 |
| 2. | "Just Because" | Jeremy Lubbock, Mervyn Warren | 3:25 |
| 3. | "Let's Start Right Now" | Abel Silva, Cristóvão Bastos, Roxanne Seeman | 4:59 |
| 4. | "At The Same Time" | Ann Hampton Callaway | 4:16 |

== Charts ==
Chart performance for "If You Ever Leave Me"
| Chart (1999) | Peak position |
|---|---|
| Australia (ARIA) | 92 |
| Canada Adult Contemporary (RPM) | 29 |
| Europe (Eurochart Hot 100) | 90 |
| Netherlands (Single Top 100) | 82 |
| Scotland (Official Charts Company) | 26 |
| UK Singles (Official Charts) | 26 |
| US Hot Country Songs (Billboard) | 62 |
