= Partners (Barbra Streisand album) =

Studio album by Barbra Streisand
- Released: September 16, 2014
- Recorded: 2013–2014
- Studios: Brandon's Way (Hollywood, California); Capitol Recording Studios (Hollywood, California); Crescent Moon Studios (Miami, Florida); Grandma's House (Malibu, California); SoulFuel Studios (Brentwood, Tennessee); The Eastwood Scoring Stage, Warner Brothers Studios (Burbank, California); The Newman Scoring Stage, Fox Studios (Los Angeles, California); The Streisand Scoring Stage, Sony Pictures (Culver City, California); Verve Studio (Santa Monica, California); WallyWorld Studios (Los Angeles, California); Woodshed Recording Studios (Malibu, California)
- Genres: Traditional pop; vocal pop
- Length: 50:27
- Label: Columbia
- Producers: Walter Afanasieff; Kenneth "Babyface" Edmonds; Bernie Herms; Barbra Streisand

Barbra Streisand chronology
Back to Brooklyn (2013)	Partners (2014)	Encore: Movie Partners Sing Broadway (2016)

Singles from Partners
- 1. "It Had to Be You" Released: 2014; 2. "What Kind of Fool" Released: 2014

Partners is the thirty-fourth studio album by American singer Barbra Streisand, released on September 16, 2014, by Columbia Records. The album features Streisand singing duets with an all-male lineup including Stevie Wonder, Michael Bublé, Billy Joel, John Legend, John Mayer, Andrea Bocelli, Lionel Richie, and from an earlier recording, Elvis Presley (who died in 1977). The collection also features Streisand's first studio-recorded duet with her then-47-year-old son, Jason Gould. The album release was promoted on The Tonight Show, where Streisand was the evening's sole guest and sang a medley with host Jimmy Fallon.

While the recordings are new, most of the songs have a previous history as Streisand releases. Two classic Streisand duets are updated with new partners: "What Kind of Fool", newly performed with John Legend (originally with Barry Gibb) and "Lost Inside of You", newly performed with Kenny Edmonds (originally with Kris Kristofferson). The deluxe edition features an additional duet with Edmonds along with previously released material featuring Frank Sinatra (who died in 1998), Bryan Adams, Barry Manilow, and Barry Gibb (from The Bee Gees).

Partners is one of 2014's best-selling albums in the US, having sold 856,000 copies. Partners topped the Billboard 200 with sales of 196,000 copies in the first week, making Streisand the only recording artist to have a number-one album in six different decades (1960s, 1970s, 1980s, 1990s, 2000s, and 2010s.) It was also certified gold in November 2014 and platinum in January 2015, thus becoming Streisand's 52nd gold and 31st Platinum album (she also has 7 Gold-certified singles to her credit), more than any other female artist in history. The album was nominated for Best Traditional Pop Vocal album at the 57th Grammy Awards.

Streisand released the companion album The Secret of Life: Partners, Volume Two in 2025.

== Commercial performance ==
In its debut week, the album topped US Billboard 200 sales charts, selling over 196,000 copies. It fell to number three the following week, selling 127,000 copies, the lowest second-week decline for a number one-debuting non-compilation album in nearly four years. After just six weeks on sale, the album crossed half a million in US sales, having sold 526,000 copies total in the country. Partners was 2014's seventh best-selling album in the US, having sold 856,000 copies. As of September 2015, the album has sold 955,000 copies in the US. It tops 1 million in traditional album sales in the week of August 14, 2017.

In Canada and Australia the album also reached number one, selling 13,000 copies in each country. In the Netherlands, New Zealand, and UK the album reached the number two spot on national sales charts, becoming Streisand's highest-charting album in the Netherlands since One Voice peaked at the same position in 1987. In Ireland the album reached the number six position, becoming Streisand's highest-charting album since Guilty Pleasures in 2005. The album debuted in the Top 10 in Austria, Germany, Spain and Poland, and reached Top 40 positions in Belgium (both regions), Denmark, Italy and Switzerland.

== Critical reception ==
Professional ratings
Aggregate scores
Source	Rating
Metacritic	55/100
Review scores
Source	Rating
AllMusic	3.5/5 stars
New York Daily News	3/5 stars
Los Angeles Times	2/4 stars
The New York Times	Negative
The Telegraph (UK)	2/5 stars

The album received mixed reviews from music critics. Matt Collar from AllMusic website praised the album and wrote that Partners "works as guided tour down Streisand's memory lane, and with her resonant voice still in supple shape, any excuse to hear her sing is a welcome invitation." Jim Farber from New York Daily News gave the album three out of five stars and wrote that "only four of the 12 cuts establish a real relationship between the singers, and most of those successes are crowded together at the start." Mikael Wood from Los Angeles Times wrote that while Streisand claimed that her goal with the album was not simply to remake some of her biggest hits but to provide "a whole other way of looking at the song", most of the dozen tracks on Partners "offer no such vantage", he also elected Streisand's duet with Babyface "Evergreen" the best moment of the album thanks to the vocals in "which she modulates her gale-force singing to suit his sumptuous quiet-storm groove". Stephen Holden, Nate Chinen and Ben Ratliff from the New York Times criticized the album and wrote that the "instrumentation and the vocal tracks are so processed in pursuit of a high-gloss perfection that any sense of two people standing side by side and singing their hearts out is lost", they also claimed that while Streisand's "voice has noticeably diminished in size" it pulls "its signature quality, ingrained sob" the duets "lack conversational or narrative flow, and you have an uncomfortable sense that the parts were spliced together after the fact". Helen Brown from The Telegraph gave the album two out of five stars and wrote that "while Streisand's voice still soars this lackluster collection falls into the icky celebrity duet traps".

== Track listing ==
- All tracks produced by Kenny Edmonds and Walter Afanasieff; except "I Still Can See Your Face" produced by Bernie Herms, and "How Deep Is the Ocean" produced by Barbra Streisand.

Standard edition
No.	Title	Writer(s)	Duet partner	Length
1.	"It Had to Be You"	Gus Kahn, Isham Jones	Michael Bublé	4:23
2.	"People"	Bob Merrill, Jule Styne	Stevie Wonder	4:14
3.	"Come Rain or Come Shine"	Johnny Mercer, Harold Arlen	John Mayer	4:11
4.	"Evergreen"	Paul Williams, Barbra Streisand	Kenny Edmonds	3:14
5.	"New York State of Mind"	Billy Joel	Billy Joel	4:47
6.	"I'd Want It to Be You"	Steve Dorff, Jay Landers, Bobby Tomberlin	Blake Shelton	4:05
7.	"The Way We Were"	Alan and Marilyn Bergman, Marvin Hamlisch	Lionel Richie	4:29
8.	"I Still Can See Your Face"	Bernie Herms, Charlie Midnight, Jay Landers	Andrea Bocelli	4:13
9.	"How Deep Is the Ocean"	Irving Berlin	Jason Gould	4:18
10.	"What Kind of Fool"	Barry Gibb, Albhy Galuten	John Legend	4:43
11.	"Somewhere"	Stephen Sondheim, Leonard Bernstein	Josh Groban	4:05
12.	"Love Me Tender"	Ken Darby, W. W. Fosdick, George R. Poulton Elvis Presley	Elvis Presley (vocal sample of original 1956 recording)	3:31

Deluxe edition bonus tracks
No.	Title	Writer(s)	Duet partner	Length
13.	"Lost Inside of You" (2014, previously unreleased)	Barbra Streisand, Leon Russell	Kenny Edmonds	4:18
14.	"I've Got a Crush on You" (1993, Duets)	Ira Gershwin, George Gershwin	Frank Sinatra	3:22
15.	"I Finally Found Someone" (1996, The Mirror Has Two Faces soundtrack)	Barbra Streisand, Marvin Hamlisch, Bryan Adams, Robert John "Mutt" Lange	Bryan Adams	3:41
16.	"I Won't Be the One to Let Go" (2002, Duets)	Barry Manilow, Richard Marx	Barry Manilow	4:40
17.	"Guilty" (1980, Guilty)	Barry Gibb, Robin Gibb, Maurice Gibb	Barry Gibb	4:28
Total length:				70:37

Note

- "I Still Can See Your Face" features Italian lyrics translated by Marco Marinangeli.

== Personnel ==
Information is based on the Album's Liner Notes

- Walter Afanasieff - piano (2–7, 10–11), guitar, mandolin played by, concertina programmed by (12), bass played by (4–7, 10), synths played by, rhythm programmed by (2, 4–7, 10–11), orchestra arranged by (1–7, 9–12)
- Kenny Edmonds - background vocals (4, 7, 10), lead vocals (4)
- Chuck Berghofer - bass played by (1, 3)
- Teddy Campbell - drums (2)
- Peter Erskine - drums (1, 3)
- Bernie Herms - piano, synth played by, rhythm programmed by, orchestra arranged by (8)
- John Mayer - guitar solo, vocals (3)
- Rickey Minor - bass played by (2)
- Dean Parks - guitar (1, additional on 3), pedal steel guitar (6)
- Michael Ripoll - guitars (2, 4–5, 7, 10, additional on 6, 12)
- William Ross - orchestra arranged by (1–7, 9–12), orchestra conducted by (All tracks)
- Randy Waldman - piano (1)
- Stevie Wonder - harmonica, vocals (2)

== Chart positions ==
=== Weekly charts ===
Chart (2014)	Peak position
Australian Albums (ARIA)	1
Austrian Albums (Ö3 Austria)	10
Belgian Albums (Ultratop Flanders)	17
Belgian Albums (Ultratop Wallonia)	26
Canadian Albums (Billboard)	1
Croatian Albums	16
Czech Albums (ČNS IFPI)	14
Danish Albums (Hitlisten)	29
Dutch Albums (Album Top 100)	2
French Albums (SNEP)	45
German Albums (Offizielle Top 100)	9
Greek Albums (IFPI)	34
Hungarian Albums (MAHASZ)	10
Irish Albums (IRMA)	6
Italian Albums (FIMI)	18
Japanese Albums (Oricon)	104
Mexican Albums (AMPROFON	59
New Zealand Albums (RMNZ)	2
Norwegian Albums (VG-lista)	25
Polish Albums (ZPAV)	6
Scottish Albums (Official Charts)	2
South African Albums (RISA)	15
Spanish Albums (Promusicae)	4
Swiss Albums (Schweizer Hitparade)	16
South Korean Albums (Gaon Chart)	11
UK Albums (Official Charts)	2
US Billboard 200	1
US Indie Store Album Sales (Billboard)	2

=== Year-end charts ===
Chart (2014)	Position
Australian Albums (ARIA)	17
Belgian Albums (Ultratop Flanders)	155
Canadian Albums (Billboard)	29
Dutch Albums (Album Top 100)	29
New Zealand Albums (RMNZ)	25
Polish Albums (ZPAV)	28
UK Albums (OCC)	14
US Billboard 200	20

Chart (2015)	Position
US Billboard 200	101

=== Decade-end charts ===
Chart (2010–2019)	Position
US Billboard 200	183

== Certifications and sales ==
Region	Certification	Certified units/sales
Australia (ARIA)	Platinum	70,000^{^}
Canada (Music Canada)	Gold	40,000^{^}
Hungary (MAHASZ)	Gold	1,000^{^}
New Zealand (RMNZ)	Gold	7,500^{^}
Poland (ZPAV)	Platinum	20,000^{‡}
United Kingdom (BPI)	Platinum	371,252
United States (RIAA)	Platinum	1,000,000
^{^} Shipments figures based on certification alone.^{‡} Sales+streaming figures based on certification alone.
