= One Night Only: Barbra Streisand and Quartet at The Village Vanguard =

One Night Only: Barbra Streisand and Quartet at the Village Vanguard

Video by Barbra Streisand
- Released: May 4, 2010
- Recorded: September 26, 2009
- Venue: The Village Vanguard (New York City)
- Genre: Jazz, pop
- Label: Columbia

Barbra Streisand chronology
Live in 2006 (2009)	One Night Only: Barbra Streisand and Quartet at the Village Vanguard (2010)

One Night Only: Barbra Streisand and Quartet at the Village Vanguard is a DVD/Blu-ray release of Barbra Streisand's unique album launch for her 2009 album Love Is the Answer.

== Release information ==
In 2009, in celebration of her new album Love Is the Answer, Streisand announced she would perform one special concert at the Village Vanguard in New York City, New York. Streisand was backed by a quartet consisting of Tamir Hendelman (piano), Jeff Carney (bass), Brian Koonin (guitar) and Ray Marchica (drums). The audience included special guests and celebrity friends of Streisand such as Bill, Hillary and Chelsea Clinton, Sarah Jessica Parker, Barry Diller and Diane von Fürstenberg, Sandy Gallin, Frank Rich, Donna Karan, and Nicole Kidman, as well as 100 contest winners. The release came in the formats of standard DVD, Blu-ray and deluxe edition DVD/CD combo pack.

== Track listing ==
=== DVD/Blu-ray ===
1. "Introductions" – 9:49
2. "Here's to Life" (Artie Butler, Phyllis Molinary) – 5:18
3. "In the Wee Small Hours of the Morning" (Bob Hilliard, David Mann) – 5:36
4. "Gentle Rain" (Luiz Bonfá, Matt Dubey) – 3:52
5. "Spring Can Really Hang You Up the Most" (Fran Landesman, Tommy Wolf) – 5:50
6. "If You Go Away (Ne me quitte pas)" (Jacques Brel, Rod McKuen) – 5:35
7. "Where Do You Start?" (Johnny Mandel, Alan and Marilyn Bergman) – 6:06
8. "Nobody's Heart (Belongs to Me)" (Lorenz Hart, Richard Rodgers) – 3:29
9. "Make Someone Happy" (Betty Comden, Adolph Green, Jule Styne) – 5:16
10. "My Funny Valentine" (Hart, Rodgers) – 2:50
11. "Bewitched, Bothered and Bewildered" (Hart, Rodgers) – 10:21
12. "Evergreen (Love Theme From A Star Is Born)" (Barbra Streisand, Paul Williams) – 4:52
13. "Some Other Time" (Leonard Bernstein, Comden, Green) – 6:49
14. "The Way We Were" (Marvin Hamlisch, Bergman, Bergman) – 3:48
15. "Credits" – 2:13
- Bonus feature: "Village Vanguard Vignette" – 6:47

=== CD ===
1. "Introductions"
2. "Here's to Life"
3. "In The Wee Small Hours of the Morning"
4. "Gentle Rain"
5. "Spring Can Really Hang You Up the Most"
6. "If You Go Away (Ne Me Quitte Pas)"
7. "Where Do You Start?"
8. "Nobody's Heart (Belongs to Me)"
9. "Make Someone Happy"
10. "My Funny Valentine"
11. "Bewitched, Bothered and Bewildered"
12. "Thank You's and Introductions"
13. "Evergreen (Love Theme from A Star Is Born)"
14. "Exit Music"
15. "Some Other Time"
16. "The Way We Were"

== Charts ==
Chart (2010)	Position
Australia	14
Austria	4
Czech Republic	5
The Netherlands	3
New Zealand	6
Switzerland	6
United Kingdom	2
United States	1

== Certifications ==
Region	Certification	Certified units/sales
Australia (ARIA)	Gold	7,500^{^}
United States (RIAA)	Platinum	100,000^{^}
^{^} Shipments figures based on certification alone.
