= I Won't Be the One to Let Go =

Single by Barbra Streisand and Barry Manilow

from the album Duets
- Released: November 4, 2002
- Genre: Pop
- Length: 4:41
- Label: Columbia
- Songwriters: Richard Marx; Barry Manilow
- Producers: Richard Marx; Walter Afanasieff

Barbra Streisand singles chronology
| "If You Ever Leave Me" (1999) | "I Won't Be the One to Let Go" (2002) | "Stranger in a Strange Land" (2005) |

Barry Manilow singles chronology
| "They Dance!" (2001) | "I Won't Be the One to Let Go" (2002) | "River" (2003) |

"I Won't Be the One to Let Go" is a song recorded by American singers Barbra Streisand and Barry Manilow for the former's sixth compilation album, Duets (2002). It was released as the album's only single on November 4, 2002, by Columbia Records. The track was written and produced by Richard Marx with additional songwriting coming from Manilow and additional production handled by Walter Afanasieff. Initially an airplay and streaming-only single in the United States, a promotional CD single of "I Won't Be the One to Let Go" was released and includes the radio edit and album version of the song.

An adult contemporary pop ballad, the single contains lyrics discussing mutual love in a relationship and dismissing fears of abandonment. The song divided music critics, with some calling it sweet and "feel-good", but others describing it as mediocre and unmemorable. In 2014, Streisand featured "I Won't Be the One to Let Go" as a bonus track on the deluxe edition of her 34th studio album, Partners.

== Background and release ==
"I Won't Be the One to Let Go" is taken from Barbra Streisand's compilation album Duets (2002), a collection of 19 duets spanning from her career. Her duet with Barry Manilow is one of the record's two new tracks, the other being "All I Know of Love" with Josh Groban. "I Won't Be the One to Let Go" was written and produced by Richard Marx with additional songwriting coming from Manilow and additional production handled by Walter Afanasieff. It serves as Streisand's first single release since 1999's "If You Ever Leave Me", which was a duet with Vince Gill and is also featured as one of the nineteen songs on the parent album.

The single was first available for digital streaming on AOL Music on November 4, 2002, as an exclusive privilege to website members. Although the track was not released commercially, "I Won't Be the One to Let Go" was distributed as a promotional CD single on January 6, 2003. With the release handled by Columbia Records, the CD was sent exclusively to United States radio stations and includes the "Radio Version Edit" and "Radio Version" releases of the song. In 2014, Streisand featured her duet as a bonus track on the deluxe edition of her 34th studio album, Partners.

== Recording and composition ==
With a duration of four minutes and 41 seconds, "I Won't Be the One to Let Go" is an adult contemporary pop ballad, which, according to William Ruhlmann from AllMusic, is similar to the entirety of the songs featured on Duets. In an interview for Barry Gram magazine, Manilow expressed pleasure in having one of his songs sung by Streisand and called her voice "amazing". He elaborated:

I've just recorded it with the brilliant Barbra Streisand ... we sound like we like each other and mean what we're singing because we worked on it together, in the same room, for days and days before we went into the studio. I think that there's an obvious connection between the two of us (we actually come from the same neighborhood in Brooklyn) and I think you will be able to feel that when you hear the song. It's a wonderful duet and I'm very proud of the song.

Lyrically, Streisand and Manilow talk about mutual love in a relationship and, at times, they dismiss fears that they have, such as abandonment. During the second verse, they alternate: "Who knows what awaits us 'round the bend / Count on me, faithfully / Though everything we have could never end / It could never end." In the chorus, they sing: "This I swear, this I swear / I won't be the one to let go, to let go..."

== Critical reception ==
A staff member at Billboard acknowledged both "I Won't Be the One to Let Go" and album track "All I Know of Love" as the "two fine new efforts" on Duets, calling the former single a "sweet" collaboration. BBC Music's Morag Reavley enjoyed the single, calling it a "soaring, feel-good" track. However, William Ruhlmann from AllMusic was more critical of the song, describing it as just "mediocre". Tom Santopietro, author of The Importance of Being Barbra: The Brilliant, Tumultuous Career of Barbra Streisand, called "I Won't Be the One to Let Go" a "paltry [...] new song" and ultimately found it to be unmemorable.

== Track listing ==
Promotional CD single
| No. | Title | Length |
|---|---|---|
| 1. | "I Won't Be the One to Let Go" (Radio Version Edit) | 4:13 |
| 2. | "I Won't Be the One to Let Go" (Radio Version) | 4:40 |

== Release history ==
| Region | Date | Format(s) | Label | Ref. |
|---|---|---|---|---|
| United States | November 4, 2002 | Streaming | Columbia | |
| United States | January 6, 2003 | Airplay; promotional CD single | Columbia | |
