= Live in Concert 2006 =

Live album by Barbra Streisand
- Released: May 8, 2007
- Recorded: October 9–30, 2006
- Venues: Madison Square Garden, New York City; Verizon Center, Washington, D.C. BB&T Center, Sunrise
- Genre: Concert
- Length: 90:01 (Standard)
- Label: Columbia
- Producers: Barbra Streisand; Jay Landers

Barbra Streisand chronology
Guilty Pleasures (2005)	Live in Concert 2006 (2007)	Love Is the Answer (2009)

Live in Concert 2006 is a live album by American singer Barbra Streisand that was recorded during her record-setting 2006 US tour known as Streisand: The Tour. The double album contains songs recorded at different shows and venues including New York City's Madison Square Garden and Washington, D.C.'s Verizon Center. Three songs Streisand performed live on the tour with Il Divo are featured on the album.

The album peaked at number 7 on the Billboard 200 on May 26, 2007 (62,000 copies), and sold 106,000 after 4 weeks on charts.

== Track listing ==
=== Disc 1: Act I ===
1. "Funny Girl Broadway Overture" (Jule Styne) – 4:47
2. "Starting Here, Starting Now" (music by David Shire, lyrics by Richard Maltby Jr.) – 2:57
3. "Opening Remarks" – 1:33
4. "Down With Love" (music by Harold Arlen, lyrics by E.Y. Harburg) – 3:57
5. "The Way We Were" (music by Marvin Hamlisch, lyrics by Alan Bergman & Marilyn Bergman) – 3:48
6. "Songwriting (Dialogue)" – 1:53
7. "Ma Première Chanson" (music by Barbra Streisand, lyrics by Eddy Marnay) – 2:37
8. "Evergreen" (with Il Divo) (music by Streisand, lyrics by Paul Williams) – 4:05
9. "Come Rain or Come Shine" (music by Arlen, lyrics by Johnny Mercer) – 3:09
10. "Funny Girl (Dialogue)" – 0:52
11. "Funny Girl" (music by Styne, lyrics by Bob Merrill) – 2:32
12. "The Music That Makes Me Dance" (Styne, Merrill) – 1:37
13. "My Man" (Jacques Charles, Channing Pollock, Albert Willemetz, Maurice Yvain) – 3:28
14. "People (Dialogue)" – 0:29
15. "People" (Styne, Merrill) – 5:08

=== Disc 2: Act II ===
1. "Entr'acte" – 3:37
2. "The Music of the Night" (with Il Divo) (music by Andrew Lloyd Webber, lyrics by Charles Hart) – 4:16
3. "Jason's Theme" (Jason Gould) – 1:14
4. "Carefully Taught / Children Will Listen" (music by Richard Rodgers, lyrics by Oscar Hammerstein II / Stephen Sondheim) – 3:29
5. "Unusual Way" (Maury Yeston) – 3:33
6. "What Are You Doing the Rest of Your Life?" (music by Michel LeGrand, lyrics by Bergman & Bergman) – 3:58
7. "Happy Days Are Here Again" (music by Milton Ager, lyrics by Jack Yellen) – 2:31
8. "(Have I Stayed) Too Long at the Fair?" (Billy Barnes) – 4:45
9. "William Saroyan (Dialogue)" – 1:40
10. "The Time of Your Life" (William Saroyan) – 1:00
11. "A Cockeyed Optimist" (Rodgers, Hammerstein) – 2:28
12. "Somewhere (Dialogue)" – 1:13
13. "Somewhere" (with Il Divo) (music by Leonard Bernstein, lyrics by Stephen Sondheim) – 3:34
14. "My Shining Hour" (Arlen, Mercer) – 4:31
15. "Don't Rain on My Parade (Reprise)" (Styne, Merrill) – 3:30
16. "Smile" (music by Charlie Chaplin, lyrics by John Turner & Geoffrey Parsons) – 4:26

=== Bonus tracks ===
- "When the Sun Comes Out" (music by Arlen, lyrics by Ted Koehler)
  - Available on Barnes & Noble Exclusive Edition
- "Stoney End" (Laura Nyro)
- "Don't Rain on My Parade" (Styne, Merrill) from Funny Girl suite in Act I
  - Available on Target Exclusive Edition

== Charts ==
=== Weekly ===
Chart (2007)	Peak position
Australian Albums (ARIA)	157
Austrian Albums (Ö3 Austria)	7
Belgian Albums (Ultratop Wallonia)	100
Dutch Albums (Album Top 100)	5
French Albums (SNEP)	83
German Albums (Offizielle Top 100)	54
Irish Albums (IRMA)	26
Italian Albums (FIMI)	48
Scottish Albums (Official Charts)	64
Spanish Albums (Promusicae)	8
Swiss Albums (Schweizer Hitparade)	23
UK Albums (Official Charts)	48
US Billboard 200	7

=== Year-end chart ===
Chart (2007)	Position
Dutch Albums (MegaCharts)	100
