= Harold Sings Arlen (With Friend) =

Studio album by Harold Arlen
- Released: 1966
- Recorded: 1966
- Genre: Traditional pop, jazz
- Label: Columbia OL 2920
- Producer: Thomas Z. Shepard

Harold Sings Arlen (With Friend) is a 1966 vocal album by the composer Harold Arlen with arrangements by Peter Matz. Arlen is accompanied on two songs by Barbra Streisand. This was Arlen's only album on which he performed as a singer.

Chris Colfer and Lea Michele performed Matz's arrangement of "Ding-Dong! The Witch Is Dead" from the album in a 2011 episode of Glee.

== Reception ==
Professional ratings
Review scores
| Source | Rating |
|---|---|
| Allmusic | 4/5 stars |

The initial Billboard review from April 16, 1966 said that Arlen "...has a way with a vocal that's quite winning" and that "his manner is soft but persuasive". The album was one of Billboards 'Pop Special Merit Picks' for the week.

William Ruhlmann reviewed the album for Allmusic and wrote that Arlen "proves he can carry a tune" on the album but "Arlen's modest singing voice doesn't quite justify the treatment" of a fully orchestrated album though he sings the lyrics with "feeling and understanding".

Streisand's vocal on "House of Flowers" has been particularly praised; Arlen's biographer Edward Jablonski described it as a "classic" and Billboard wrote that it was a "knockout".

== Track listing ==
All songs composed by Harold Arlen, with lyricists indicated

1. "Blues in the Night" (Johnny Mercer) – 3:55
2. "Little Biscuit" (E.Y. "Yip" Harburg) – 3:54
3. "Ding-Dong! The Witch Is Dead" (Harburg) – 1:54
4. "A Sleepin' Bee" (Truman Capote) – 3:39
5. "In the Shade of the New Apple Tree" (Harburg) – 4:02
6. "Hit the Road to Dreamland" (Mercer) – 2:35
7. "Ac-Cent-Tchu-Ate the Positive" (Mercer) – 2:37
8. "My Shining Hour" (Mercer) – 3:21
9. "Today I Love Everybody" (Dorothy Fields) – 2:08
10. "House of Flowers" (Capote) – 2:43
11. "For Every Man There's a Woman" (Leo Robin) – 2:25
12. "That's a Fine Kind O' Freedom" (Martin Charnin) – 2:39

== Personnel ==
- Harold Arlen – vocals
- Barbra Streisand – vocals on "Ding-Dong! The Witch Is Dead" and "House of Flowers"
- Peter Matz – arranger
- Thomas Z. Shepard – production
