= I've Dreamed of You =

1999 single by Barbra Streisand

Single by Barbra Streisand

from the album A Love Like Ours
- Released: July 1999
- Genre: Adult Contemporary; ballad
- Length: 4:45
- Label: Columbia Records
- Songwriters: Ann Hampton Callaway; Rolf Lovland
- Producer: Barbra Streisand

Barbra Streisand singles chronology
"Tell Him" (1997)	"I've Dreamed of You" (1999)	"If You Ever Leave Me" (1999)

"I've Dreamed of You" is a 1999 adult contemporary single by American singer Barbra Streisand from the album A Love Like Ours. It has lyrics by Ann Hampton Callaway and music by Rolf Lovland and was produced by Streisand.

== Production ==
Upon request by Barbra Streisand, the song was written by Ann Hampton Callaway as Streisand's wedding song to actor James Brolin. It was one of two songs recorded by Streisand that were written by Callaway. The song was released in mid 1999 in anticipation of the release of A Love Like Ours in October of that year. Streisand performed the song at her own wedding. Callaway performed the song in 2012 in her show The Streisand Songbook at 54 Below.

== Critical reception ==
Chuck Taylor from Billboard described the song as a "string-laden, gently produced ballad". Another editor deemed it a "dreamy love song" with lyrics that "drool sentimentality and dedication". The New York Times called it a "confectionary love song". The Importance of Being Barbra deemed the song "somewhat forgettable". Out described it as a "summer hit". The Free Lance–Star called it "warm and cuddly". Calhoun Times wrote that the song was "almost lullaby-like in its delicateness", "genuinely sweet" and "touching".
