= The Movie Album (Barbra Streisand album) =

Studio album by Barbra Streisand
- Released: October 14, 2003
- Recorded: June–July 2003
- Studios: Sony Pictures Studios (Culver City, California); Grandma's House (Malibu, California); The Hop (Studio City, California)
- Genre: Orchestral pop
- Length: 51:42
- Label: Columbia
- Producers: Barbra Streisand; Robbie Buchanan; Johnny Mandel

Barbra Streisand chronology
Duets (2002)	The Movie Album (2003)	Guilty Pleasures (2005)

The Movie Album is the thirtieth studio album by American singer Barbra Streisand, released on October 14, 2003, by Columbia Records. Overall, her sixtieth release with her record label, it was executively produced by Streisand and her manager, Jay Landers. A concept album, it contains twelve songs from the singer's favorite films ranging in release from 1935 to 1988. While curating the album, Streisand was inspired by her marriage to actor James Brolin to record songs about love and relationships. To better fit her needs, songwriting duo Alan and Marilyn Bergman were commissioned to add lyrics to several of the songs Streisand had chosen to record.

Individual songs on the parent album were produced by Streisand, Robbie Buchanan, and Johnny Mandel. The record contains orchestral pop compositions accompanied by a 75-piece film orchestra, recorded on set at various studio locations in California during June and July 2003. Simultaneously with the release of The Movie Album, Columbia Records distributed a sampler extended play (EP) version of the album titled Selections from the Movie Album. A deluxe edition with audio commentary and music videos for her covers of "Wild Is the Wind" and "I'm in the Mood for Love" was released exclusively in the United States. Streisand also performed live on The Oprah Winfrey Show, marking her first televised performance in forty years.

Music critics highlighted Streisand's singing ability and the lushness of the album as a whole. However, some felt the collection of songs was boring and ultimately disappointing. Nonetheless, it received a Grammy nomination for Best Traditional Pop Vocal Album in 2004. Commercially, The Movie Album reached the top ten of record charts in Canada and the United States. It also received record certifications in Australia, the United Kingdom, and the United States. The Movie Album is Streisand's best-selling studio album from the 2000s and has since sold over 694,000 copies in the United States.

== Background and development ==
The Movie Album is Streisand's sixtieth album overall as a signed artist with Columbia Records. It contains twelve songs from some of the singer's favorite films released since her birth year. Furthermore, she told Ileane Rudolph in an interview with TV Guide that her covers of "Smile" and "More in Love with You" are her two favorite tracks on The Movie Album. Regarding her decision for to record a concept album, she said: "I’ve always been very influenced by the movies, ever since I was a kid and kind of dreamed in the movies. A lot of the songs come from my memories of how that music affected me." The album was released on October 14, 2003, through her label and is the singer's thirtieth studio effort and first studio album of original material in the 2000s. Despite the title of the record being The Movie Album, it does not contain any of the songs that Streisand has recorded specifically for any of her films. However, the singer did state, in an interview with USA Today, that "she would like to work again in film and would even consider doing another movie musical".

Recording sessions for The Movie Album took place at various studio locations throughout California in June and July 2003: Streisand worked at Sony Pictures Studios in Culver City, Grandma's House in Malibu, and The Hop in Studio City. A limited edition deluxe version, limited to 250,000 CD copies, with a bonus DVD including two previously unreleased music videos for "Wild Is the Wind" and "I'm in the Mood for Love" was released. It also features a live visual with Streisand discussing the album's tracks titled "Song Commentary". Alongside the release of The Movie Album, Columbia Records distributed a sampler extended play (EP) version of the album titled Selections from the Movie Album, featuring Streisand's renditions of "Smile", "Calling You", and "Moon River". For further promotion, the singer was a guest on The Oprah Winfrey Show on October 14, 2003, and performed songs from The Movie Album; it marked her first appearance on national television since 1963.

== Inspiration and songs ==
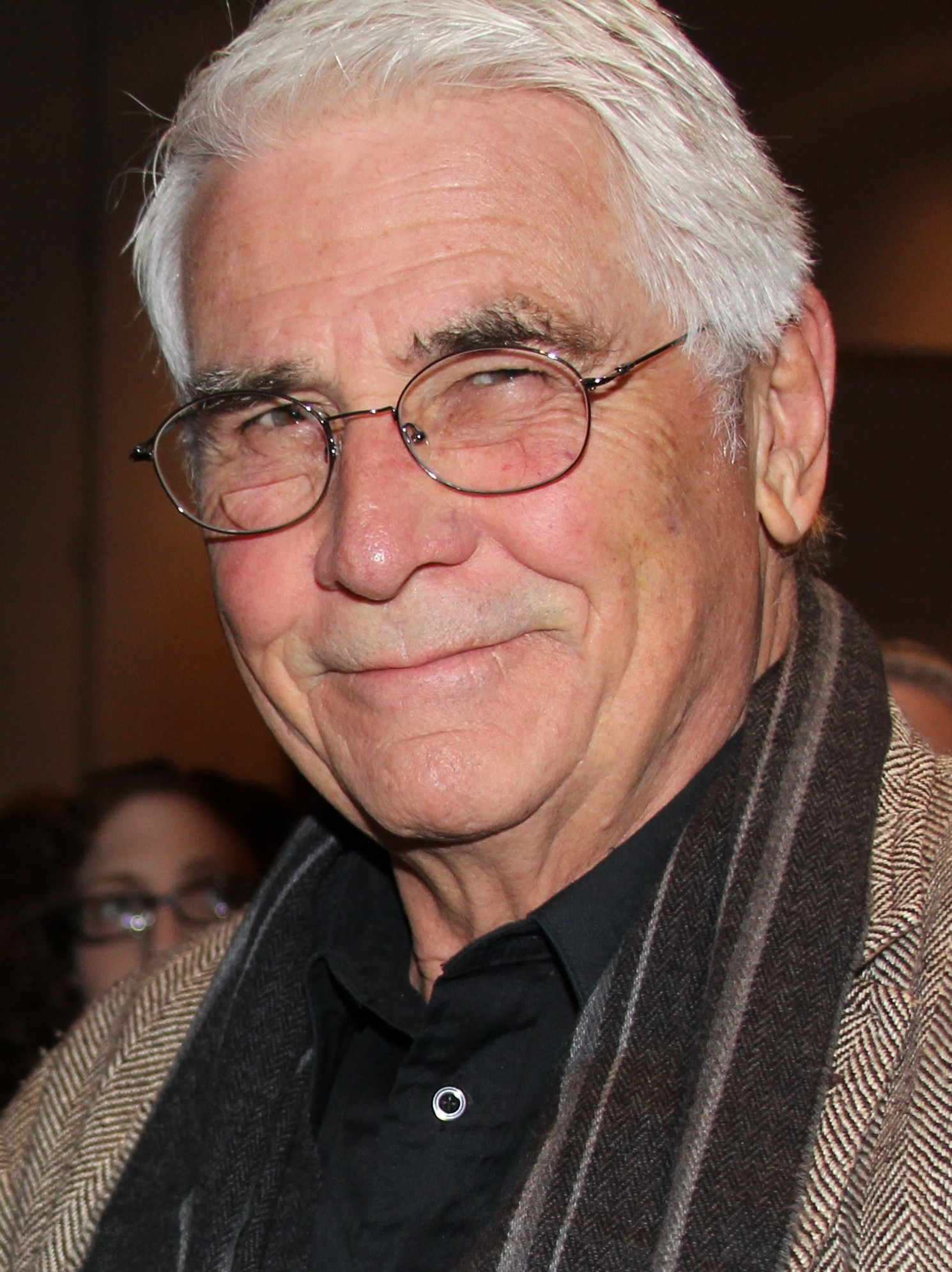
Streisand's husband, actor James Brolin, proved to be a source of inspiration for her while recording The Movie Album.

With The Movie Album, Streisand wanted to share her favorite tracks written specifically for movies from the years 1935 to 1988. To achieve a cinematic quality to the album's songs, she sung over a 75-piece orchestra that is rarely seen in popular music. Conducted by the orchestra, violins are present on each of the album's twelve tracks. Featuring orchestral pop pieces, a theme common within the lyrics on The Movie Album is "mature love", which AllMusic's William Ruhlmann felt reflected the singer's age. The singer was also inspired by her marriage to husband James Brolin. Streisand executively produced the collection with her manager, Jay Landers, and Robbie Buchanan and Johnny Mandel are credited as additional producers on four of the album's tracks.

It opens with a cover of Charlie Chaplin's "Smile", from the 1936 film Modern Times. According to Streisand, she was inspired to record the song after receiving a new dog from her husband as a birthday present, following the decision to put down her Bijon Frise dog earlier that same year. The second song is "Moon River", which was originally performed by Henry Mancini and taken from Breakfast at Tiffany's (1961). Streisand's cover of "I'm in the Mood for Love", from 1935's Every Night at Eight, is the oldest song that appears on The Movie Album, and was written by Dorothy Fields and Jimmy McHugh. In the album's fourth track, "Wild Is the Wind", Streisand places emphasis on the romantic song lyric "You're life itself!", which Ruhlmann from AllMusic considered to be convincing as a singer. She claimed that she had always wanted to perform a rendition of "Wild Is the Wind" after hearing Johnny Mathis sing it live on The Ed Sullivan Show. "Emily" follows and is the only track on The Movie Album to receive additional production from Johnny Mandel, who is also credited as one of its four registered songwriters. Written by Mandel for the 1964 film The Americanization of Emily, he was also commissioned to write an additional verse for "Emily" to fulfill Streisand's likings. The singer expressed interest in recording André Previn's instrumental theme "More in Love with You", from Vincente Minnelli's 1962 film Four Horsemen of the Apocalypse, after it served as one of the songs in her wedding to Brolin. Since the track contained no lyrics, songwriter duo Alan and Marilyn Bergman received permission from Previn's family to contribute verses over the original composition.

"How Do You Keep the Music Playing?", used in 1982's Best Friends, is the collection's seventh song and was written by the Bergmans and Michel Legrand. Like "More in Love with You", it features additional "bittersweet" lyrics that were not used in the original version of the song; it contains a "flowing melody" and the lyrics "represent a larger-than-life Hollywood kind of love". The singer sang "But Beautiful" because she considered it to be a "positive song" with a tinge of sadness to it; she elaborated: "It’s a fantastic lyric, because it’s the truth. It talks about love. It’s cheerful, gay, sad, happy, quiet, mad, but it’s beautiful. Love is all those things. And you want it, no matter how painful it is." It was originally heard in the 1947 American film Road to Rio. A cover of Jevetta Steele's "Calling You" is the ninth track and was specifically written for the soundtrack to the 1987 German film Bagdad Café. As an addition, it contains a "newly penned third verse" from the song's original writer, Robert Telson. Streisand chose to sing Jimmy Van Heusen and Sammy Cahn's "The Second Time Around" as she felt the song's meaning becomes "much more pleasant when you're older". "Goodbye for Now" was written by Stephen Sondheim for the American film Reds (1981). Streisand decided to record the version that appears in the actual film rather than what is featured on the accompanying soundtrack. A cover of Inside Daisy Clover's "You're Gonna Hear from Me" serves as the closing track to The Movie Album. Ruhlmann suggested that it is reminiscent of Streisand's 1964 single "Don't Rain on My Parade".

== Critical reception ==
Professional ratings
Review scores
Source	Rating
The Advocate	(Favorable)
AllMusic	3/5 stars
Billboard	(Favorable)
Today	(Unfavorable)

Music reviewers appreciated Streisand's decision to record an album based upon songs from films; American film critic Leonard Maltin described The Movie Album as a "wonderful [and] unexpected collection of songs [with] beautiful renditions"; describing his admiration for the effort, he said: "Any album that opens with Charlie Chaplin's 'Smile' has got me hooked." Larry Flick from The Advocate applauded Streisand for "challeng[ing] herself" on songs like "Moon River", "But Beautiful", and "Calling You". He also compared the film-centric concept for the album to The Broadway Album and wrote: "Streisand is in top form with a collection that reminds us why we loved her in the first place." William Ruhlmann from AllMusic awarded The Movie Album three out of his five stars in his album review. He called it remarkable that Streisand was able to "retain [...] purity and range in her voice" given her age. Comparing its strength to her 1985 studio album, The Broadway Album, he wrote that even if others did not agree with him, "it nevertheless gives the listener some superior new takes on standards the singer has not addressed previously and uncovers a gem or two that had been overlooked till now."

Billboard's Michael Paoletta selected The Movie Album as one of three albums for his "Essential Reviews" column in the weekly magazine. He applauded it for being a "lush collection [that] reveals a range of emotions"; he also found the album to prove that the singer "remains in a league of her own". However, Nekesa Mumbi Moody from Today felt the exact opposite. While she did find the singer's voice to be "as perfect as ever" and the music to "sound [...] lush", she stated: "Yet there's little spark or emotion from Streisand on any of these songs". Concluding her album review, Moody wrote: "What Streisand intended as a loving tribute is instead a sterile treatment that is ultimately disappointing." Tom Santopietro, author of The Importance of Being Barbra: The Brilliant, Tumultuous Career of Barbra Streisand, also disliked The Movie Album and claimed that its inclusion of too many ballads was one of the issues; he also claimed that the general listener will find the album boring due to the fact that "there is nothing compelling [or] nothing demanding one's attention". He did, however, highlight Streisand' versions of "More in Love with You" and "How Do You Keep the Music Playing?".

=== Accolades ===
Streisand was nominated at the 46th Annual Grammy Awards under the Best Traditional Pop Vocal Album category for The Movie Album. As a solo artist, it was her 38th nomination overall. However, she lost to Tony Bennett and k.d. lang's joint album, A Wonderful World (2002).

== Commercial performance ==
The Movie Album debuted and peaked on the Billboard 200 at number 5, during the week of November 1, 2003. It was the week's third highest entry, behind Clay Aiken's chart-topping Measure of a Man and Jagged Edge's effort Hard, which entered at number three. It became Streisand's first top ten entry since her twenty-eighth studio album, A Love Like Ours, in 1999. The Movie Album also was the week's second best-selling digital album according to Billboard's Top Internet Albums component chart, behind Measure of a Man. The record spent fourteen weeks on the Billboard 200 and was later certified Gold by Recording Industry Association of America for shipments of 500,000 copies on November 18, 2003, less than three weeks after its release. The Movie Album serves as Streisand's best-selling album from the 2000s and has sold over 694,000 copies in the United States as of October 15, 2014. On the Canadian Albums Chart, newly compiled by Billboard, it entered and peaked at number ten, becoming Streisand's first appearance on the chart. In Australia, the record peaked at number 36 on the official albums chart and received a Gold certification from the Australian Recording Industry Association in 2003 for shipments of 35,000 units.

In Europe, The Movie Album entered several record charts in lower positions. According to the Official Charts Company, the album peaked at number 25 in the United Kingdom, and would go on to receive a Silver certification from the British Phonographic Industry for shipments of 60,000 copies. Elsewhere, it reached the top 40 on Belgium's Flanders chart, and in Greece, Scotland, and Spain. Its lowest positions were achieved in Italy, Germany, and on Belgium's Wallonia chart, where it reached positions 50, 85, and 98, respectively.

== Track listing ==
All songs were produced by Barbra Streisand, unless stated otherwise.

The Movie Album – Standard edition
No.	Title	Writer(s)	Producer(s)	Length
1.	"Smile" (from Modern Times, 1936)	Charlie Chaplin; John Turner; Geoffrey Parsons		4:16
2.	"Moon River" (from Breakfast at Tiffany's, 1961)	Henry Mancini; Johnny Mercer	Streisand; Robbie Buchanan	3:41
3.	"I'm in the Mood for Love" (from Every Night at Eight, 1935)	Dorothy Fields; Jimmy McHugh		4:01
4.	"Wild is the Wind" (from Wild is the Wind, 1957)	Dimitri Tiomkin; Ned Washington		4:12
5.	"Emily" (from The Americanization of Emily, 1964)	Mercer; Alan Bergman; Marilyn Bergman; Johnny Mandel	Streisand; Mandel	3:45
6.	"More in Love with You" (from The Four Horsemen of the Apocalypse, 1962)	A. Bergman; M. Bergman; André Previn		4:41
7.	"How Do You Keep the Music Playing?" (from Best Friends, 1982)	A. Bergman; M. Bergman; Michel Legrand	Streisand; Buchanan	5:08
8.	"But Beautiful" (from Road to Rio, 1947)	Jimmy Van Heusen; Johnny Burke		5:34
9.	"Calling You" (from Bagdad Cafe, 1987)	Robert Telson	Streisand; Buchanan	4:57
10.	"The Second Time Around" (from High Time, 1960)	Heusen; Sammy Cahn		4:33
11.	"Goodbye for Now" (from Reds, 1981)	Stephen Sondheim		2:48
12.	"You're Gonna Hear from Me" (from Inside Daisy Clover, 1965)	A. Previn; Dory Previn		4:06
Total length:				51:42

The Movie Album – Deluxe edition bonus disc
No.	Title	Length
1.	"Wild Is the Wind" (Music video)	4:43
2.	"I'm in the Mood for Love" (Music video)	4:08
3.	"Song Commentary"	6:04
Total length:		14:55

Selections from the Movie Album EP – Promotional sampler edition
No.	Title	Writer(s)	Producer(s)	Length
1.	"Smile"	Chaplin; Turner; Parsons		4:16
2.	"Calling You"	Telson	Streisand; Buchanan	4:57
3.	"Moon River"	Mancini; Mercer	Streisand; Buchanan	3:41
Total length:				12:54

== Personnel ==
Credits adapted from the standard edition liner notes of The Movie Album.

- Barbra Streisand – vocals, producer, executive producer
- Robbie Buchanan – producer (tracks 2, 7, 9), arranger (track 9), conductor (track 9), orchestration (track 9), keyboards
- Mike Lang – keyboards
- Mark Portman – keyboards
- Randy Waldman – piano, keyboards
- Mike Melvoin – piano
- Tom Rainer – piano
- Michael Thompson – guitar
- Oscar Castro-Neves – guitar
- Dean Parks – guitar
- John Pisano – guitar
- Chuck Berghofer – bass
- Neil Stubenhaus – bass
- Joel Derouin – violin (tracks 1, 6)
- Gayle Levant – harp
- Vinnie Colaiuta – drums
- Gregg Field – drums
- Paulinho Da Costa – percussion
- Tom Scott – saxophone (track 10)
- Warren Luening – flugelhorn (track 8)
- Dan Higgins – flute (track 5)
- William Galison – harmonica (track 9)
- Windy Wagner – backing vocals (track 9)
- David Blumberg – transcription (tracks 2, 9)
- Jeremy Lubbock – arranger (tracks 1, 6, 8, 11), conductor (tracks 1, 6, 8, 11)
- Jorge Calandrelli – arranger (tracks 3, 4, 10, 12), conductor (tracks 3, 4, 10, 12)
- Alexander Courage – orchestration (track 6)
- Richard Jay-Alexander – liner notes
- Jay Landers – executive producer
- Johnny Mandel – producer (track 5), arranger (track 5), conductor (track 5)
- Stephen Marcussen – mastering
- David Reitzas – mixer, recording (tracks 1, 3, 9)
- Scott Erickson – recording (tracks 2, 7, 9)
- Moogy Canazio – recording (track 9)
- Al Schmitt – recording (track 5)
- Bill Schnee – recording (tracks 2, 7)
- Stewart Whitmore – digital editor

== Charts ==
Weekly chart performance for The Movie Album
Chart (2003)	Peak position
Australian Albums (ARIA)	36
Belgian Albums (Ultratop Flanders)	29
Belgian Albums (Ultratop Wallonia)	98
Canadian Albums (Billboard)	10
Dutch Albums (Album Top 100)	43
French Albums (SNEP)	47
German Albums (Offizielle Top 100)	85
Greek Albums (IFPI)	11
Italian Albums (FIMI)	50
Scottish Albums (Official Charts)	34
Spanish Albums (PROMUSICAE)	12
UK Albums (Official Charts)	25
US Billboard 200	5

== Certifications and sales ==
Certifications for The Movie Album
Region	Certification	Certified units/sales
Australia (ARIA)	Gold	35,000^{^}
United Kingdom (BPI)	Silver	60,000^{*}
United States (RIAA)	Gold	694,000
^{*} Sales figures based on certification alone.^{^} Shipments figures based on certification alone.

== Release history ==
Region	Date	Format(s)	Edition	Label	Ref.
Various	October 14, 2003	CD	Standard	Columbia	
United States	October 14, 2003	CD + DVD	Deluxe	Columbia	
United States	October 14, 2003	SACD	Standard	Columbia	
United States	2003	CD	Promotional sampler	Columbia	
