= Higher Ground (Barbra Streisand album) =

Studio album by Barbra Streisand
- Released: November 11, 1997
- Recorded: August–September 1997
- Studios: Sony Pictures Studios (Culver City, CA); Paramount Pictures (Hollywood, CA); Wallyworld (San Rafael, CA); Chartmaker (Malibu, CA); Record Plant (Hollywood, CA); Hit Factory (New York, NY); Right Track (New York, NY); Masterphonics (Nashville, TN); The Village (Los Angeles, CA); Larrabee (North Hollywood, CA); Sony (Santa Monica, CA); Westlake (Hollywood, CA); A&M (Los Angeles, CA)
- Genre: Pop
- Length: 56:31
- Label: Columbia
- Producers: Barbra Streisand; Walter Afanasieff; David Foster; Arif Mardin; Jeremy Lubbock; Mervyn Warren

Barbra Streisand chronology
Back to Broadway (1993)	Higher Ground (1997)	A Love Like Ours (1999)

Singles from Higher Ground
- 1. "Tell Him" Released: October 7, 1997; 2. "If I Could" Released: 1997; 3. "Higher Ground" Released: 1998

Professional ratings
Review scores
Source	Rating
AllMusic	2.5/5 stars
Entertainment Weekly	C
The Guardian	4/5 stars
Los Angeles Times	3.5/4 stars
People Magazine	(mixed)

Higher Ground is the twenty-seventh studio album by American singer Barbra Streisand, her first in four years (following 1993's Back to Broadway). The album was inspired by and dedicated to Virginia Clinton Kelley. It was released in North America on November 11, 1997, and a day earlier in Europe.

The lead single, "Tell Him"—a duet with Celine Dion—was released on October 7, 1997, and become an international hit. Follow-up singles were "If I Could" and the title track. "If I Could" had been previously recorded by jazz singer Nancy Wilson as well as a medley of the inspirational standards "I Believe" and "You'll Never Walk Alone", later both issued as standalone recordings by the singer. The album also contains a cover of Bernard Ighner's "Everything Must Change", a song which Streisand had previously recorded in sessions for her 1974 album ButterFly but had remained unreleased.

Higher Ground became Streisand's eighth number-one album in the US and has sold over five million copies worldwide.

== Critical reception ==
Bob Cannon from Entertainment Weekly opined that the "persistent" strings-and-choir treatment on these 12 tunes "reduces the whole collection to one long, lush ballad that would be more at home over The Prince of Tides' closing credits." Caroline Sullivan from The Guardian wrote, "If divas there must be, let them be like Streisand, who simply eclipses wannabes like Celine Dion (whose duet with Babs, "Tell Him", appears on both women's albums). Her 54th LP, inspired by a friend's death, concerns 'the power of prayer', which led her to record uplifting tunes like "I Believe" and "You'll Never Walk Alone". Gloriously OTT, she out-does Dion, a gospel choir and entire orchestras. It all starts a bit tentatively, but she hits her breast-beating stride by the time we get to the gospelised title track, and from there till the Hebrew finale, "Avinu Malkeinu", she drains songs dry and leaves their husks behind. Fab."

== Track listing ==
1. "I Believe/You'll Never Walk Alone" (Ervin Drake, Irvin Graham, Jimmy Shirl, Al Stillman/Oscar Hammerstein II, Richard Rodgers) – 6:12
2. "Higher Ground" (Kent Agee, Steve Dorff, George Green) – 4:24
3. "At the Same Time" (Ann Hampton Callaway) – 4:18
4. "Tell Him" (duet with Celine Dion) (Walter Afanasieff, David Foster, Linda Thompson) – 4:52
5. "On Holy Ground" (Geron Davis) – 6:14
6. "If I Could" (Ken Hirsch, Ron Miller, Marti Sharron) – 4:25
7. "Circle" (Jud Friedman, Cynthia Weil) – 4:15
8. "The Water Is Wide/Deep River" (Traditional) – 5:33
9. "Leading with Your Heart" (Alan Bergman, Marilyn Bergman, Marvin Hamlisch) – 3:33
10. "Lessons to Be Learned" (Dorothy Sea Gazeley, Marsha Malamet, Alan Rich) – 4:43
11. "Everything Must Change" (Bernard Ighner) – 4:05
12. "Avinu Malkeinu" (Max Janowski) – 4:07

== Charts ==
=== Weekly charts ===
Chart (1997-1998)	Peak position
Australian Albums (ARIA)	14
Austrian Albums (Ö3 Austria)	42
Belgian Albums (Ultratop Flanders)	22
Belgian Albums (Ultratop Wallonia)	12
Canada Top Albums/CDs (RPM)	5
Dutch Albums (Album Top 100)	5
European Albums (Music & Media)	11
French Albums (SNEP)	23
German Albums (Offizielle Top 100)	35
Hungarian Albums (MAHASZ)	36
New Zealand Albums (RMNZ)	23
Norwegian Albums (VG-lista)	16
Spanish Albums (Promusicae)	29
Swedish Albums (Sverigetopplistan)	34
Swiss Albums (Schweizer Hitparade)	15
UK Albums (Official Charts)	12
US Billboard 200	1

=== Year-end charts ===
Chart (1997)	Position
Australian Albums (ARIA)	77
Canada Top Albums/CDs (RPM)	11
UK Albums (OCC)	64

Chart (1998)	Position
Dutch Albums (Album Top 100)	46
US Billboard 200	16

== Certifications and sales ==
Region	Certification	Certified units/sales
Australia (ARIA)	Platinum	70,000^{^}
Canada (Music Canada)	3× Platinum	300,000^{^}
Netherlands (NVPI)	Platinum	100,000^{^}
New Zealand (RMNZ)	Gold	7,500^{^}
Spain (Promusicae)	Gold	50,000^{^}
United Kingdom (BPI)	Gold	100,000^{^}
United States (RIAA)	3× Platinum	3,000,000^{^}
Summaries
Worldwide	—	5,000,000
^{^} Shipments figures based on certification alone.

== Awards ==
"Tell Him" was nominated for a Grammy Award for Best Pop Collaboration with Vocals in 1998.

"I Believe" was nominated for a Grammy Award for Instrumental Arrangement in 1999.
