= A Love Like Ours =

Studio album by Barbra Streisand
- Released: September 21, 1999
- Recorded: November 1998–March 1999
- Studios: Sony Pictures Studios (Culver City, CA); Chartmaker (Malibu, CA); Grandma's House (Malibu, CA); Wallyworld (San Rafael, CA); A&M (Los Angeles, CA); Sound Stage (Nashville, TN); The Enterprise (Burbank, CA); Conway (Los Angeles, CA); Capitol (Los Angeles, CA); Record Plant (Hollywood, CA); Right Track (New York, NY); Barking Doctor Studios (New York, NY)
- Genres: Pop, vocal
- Length: 51:27
- Label: Columbia
- Producers: Walter Afanasieff; Tony Brown; David Foster; Arif Mardin; Richard Marx; Barbra Streisand (also exec. producer)

Barbra Streisand chronology
Higher Ground (1997)	A Love Like Ours (1999)	Timeless: Live in Concert (2000)

Singles from A Love Like Ours
- 1. "I've Dreamed of You" Released: July 1999; 2. "If You Ever Leave Me" Released: October 18, 1999

Professional ratings
Review scores
Source	Rating
AllMusic	2.5/5 stars
The Baltimore Sun	(favorable)

A Love Like Ours is the twenty-eighth studio album by American singer Barbra Streisand. It was released in North America on September 21, 1999, and Europe on September 20, 1999. A concept album, this was Streisand's first commercial release since her marriage to actor James Brolin, with much of the album's material being inspired by the event; as such, the CD booklet contains images of her and Brolin. A Love Like Ours was Streisand's twenty-third top 10 album in the United States, though it did not achieve the success of her two previous albums, debuting at No. 6 on the Billboard 200 with sales of 145,000 copies in the first week. It was eventually certified Gold and Platinum.

The track "We Must Be Loving Right" was previously recorded by George Strait on his 1993 album Easy Come, Easy Go. Both Strait's original and Streisand's cover were produced by Tony Brown.

== Singles ==
"If You Ever Leave Me", a duet with country star Vince Gill was released to country radio. It peaked at No. 62 on Billboard's Hot Country Songs chart and stayed there for 6 weeks. In the UK the single peaked at No. 26.

"I've Dreamed of You" was also released and peaked at No. 22 on the Billboard Hot Single Sales chart and No. 12 on the Hot Canadian Digital Singles chart.

== Track listing ==
No.	Title	Writer(s)	Length
1.	"I've Dreamed of You"	Rolf Løvland; Ann Hampton Callaway	4:46
2.	"Isn't It a Pity?"	George Gershwin; Ira Gershwin	5:22
3.	"The Island"	Ivan Lins; Vitor Martins; Alan Bergman; Marilyn Bergman	4:37
4.	"Love Like Ours"	Dave Grusin; A. Bergman; M. Bergman	3:59
5.	"If You Ever Leave Me" (Duet with Vince Gill)	Richard Marx	4:38
6.	"We Must Be Loving Right"	Roger Brown; Clay Blaker	3:37
7.	"If I Never Met You"	Tom Snow; Dean Pitchford	3:38
8.	"It Must Be You"	Steve Dorff; Stephony Smith	3:29
9.	"Just One Lifetime"	Snow; Melissa Manchester	4:18
10.	"If I Didn't Love You"	Bruce Roberts; Junior Miles	4:18
11.	"Wait"	Michel Legrand; A. Bergman; M. Bergman	4:10
12.	"The Music That Makes Me Dance"	Jule Styne; Bob Merrill	4:35

== Personnel ==
Adapted from the album's liner notes.

=== Musicians ===
- Barbra Streisand – vocals (all tracks)
- Walter Afanasieff – keyboards (track 3), drum & rhythm programming (track 3), arranger (track 3)
- Doug Besterman – additional orchestration & conductor (tracks 8, 9)
- Robbie Buchanan – synthesizer (tracks 8, 9)
- Jorge Calandrelli – orchestra arranger & conductor (track 3)
- Jon Clarke – recorder (track 1)
- Jim Cox – piano (track 6)
- Paulinho da Costa – percussion (track 3)
- George Doering – guitar (tracks 8, 9)
- Bruce Dukov – violin (track 1)
- Stuart Duncan – fiddle (track 6)
- Nathan East – bass guitar (tracks 4, 5, 7, 10)
- David Foster – keyboards (tracks 5, 10), arranger (tracks 5, 10)
- Paul Franklin – steel guitar (track 6)
- Vince Gill – featured vocals (track 5), acoustic guitar (track 5), electric guitar (track 5)
- Reggie Hamilton – bass guitar (tracks 8, 9)
- Marvin Hamlisch – intro & ending arranger (track 9)
- Ralph Humphrey – drums (tracks 2, 12)
- John Jorgenson – electric guitar (track 6)
- Jorg Keller – original arrangement (track 4)
- Donald Kirkpatrick – acoustic guitar (track 5), electric guitar (track 5)
- Kenny G – tenor saxophone solo (track 3), saxophone solo (track 12)
- Michael Landau – electric guitar (track 3)
- Michael Lang – piano (tracks 2, 12)
- Jeremy Lubbock – orchestra arranger & conductor (track 11)
- Arif Mardin – arranger & orchestration (tracks 8, 9)
- Richard Marx – keyboards (track 5), arranger (track 5)
- Tommy Morgan – harmonica solo (track 2)
- Dean Parks – guitar (tracks 1, 2, 4, 7–9, 12), acoustic guitar (tracks 3, 6)
- Bruce Roberts – arranger (track 10)
- John Robinson – drums (tracks 4–10)
- William Ross – orchestra arranger & conductor (tracks 1, 2, 4, 5, 7, 10, 12), strings arranger & conductor (track 6)
- Kamil Rustam – acoustic guitar (track 5), electric guitar
- Lee Sklar – bass guitar (track 6)
- Randy Waldman – piano (track 11), keyboards (tracks 4, 7), synthesizer (tracks 8, 9)

=== Technical ===
- Barbra Streisand – producer (tracks 1, 2, 4, 7, 11, 12), executive producer, album liner notes
- Walter Afanasieff – producer (track 3)
- Greg Bieck – programming (track 3)
- Tony Brown – producer (track 6)
- Felipe Elgueta – programming (tracks 5, 10), engineer (tracks 5, 10)
- Frank Filipetti – mixing (tracks 8, 9)
- David Foster – producer (tracks 5, 10)
- Humberto Gatica – engineer (tracks 3, 5, 10, 11), mixing (tracks 3, 10)
- David Gleeson – engineer (track 3)
- Mick Guzauski – mixing (track 5)
- Peter Hume – pre-production programming (track 9)
- Jay Landers – executive producer
- Richard Marx – producer (track 5)
- Arif Mardin – producer (tracks 8, 9)
- Vlado Meller – mastering (all tracks)
- David Reitzas – engineer (tracks 1, 3, 4, 7, 11, 12), mixing (tracks 1, 2, 11, 12), mastering supervision (all tracks)
- Al Schmitt – engineer (tracks 2, 6, 12), mixing (tracks 4, 6)
- Steve Skinner – pre-production programming (tracks 8, 9)
- Frank Wolf – engineer (tracks 1, 4, 7, 8, 9), mixing (track 7)
- Patti Zimmitti, Debbi Datz-Pyle, Jules Chaiken – orchestra contractors
- Patrick Weber, Greg Dennen, Mark Eshelman, Peter Doell, Sue McLean, Nick Marshall, Rob Brill, Steve Genewick, Bill Smith, John Nelson, Chris Brooke, Adam Olmsted, Derek P. Bason, Pete Krawiec, Jeff Griffin, Aaron Lepley, Charlie Paakkari, Doug DeLong, Steve Mazur, Pete Karam, Scott Erickson – assistant engineers

Additional personnel

- Shari Sutcliffe – project coordinator
- Kim Skalecki – assistant to Barbra Streisand
- Renata Buser – assistant to Barbra Streisand, booklet photography
- Peter Fletcher – product manager for Columbia Records, booklet photography
- Gloria Gabriel – production manager for Arif Mardin
- Barbara Stout – production manager for Walter Afanasieff
- Allan Stein – album project coordinator for Columbia Records
- Nancy Donald – art direction
- Gabrielle Raumberger & Clifford Singontiko – design
- Alberto Tolot – front cover & booklet photography
- James Brolin – booklet photography
- Donna Karan – booklet photography
- Deborah Wald – booklet photography
- Linda Foster – booklet photography
- Soonie from Bruno & Soonie hair salon – hair
- Martin Erlichman – Barbra Streisand's representative

== Charts ==
=== Weekly charts ===
Chart (1999)	Peak position
Australian Albums (ARIA)	12
Austrian Albums (Ö3 Austria)	45
Belgian Albums (Ultratop Wallonia)	44
Canada Top Albums/CDs (RPM)	29
Dutch Albums (Album Top 100)	36
European Albums (Music & Media)	42
French Albums (SNEP)	36
German Albums (Offizielle Top 100)	48
Italian Albums (Musica e dischi)	31
New Zealand Albums (RMNZ)	38
Norwegian Albums (VG-lista)	6
Spain Album Charts	44
Swiss Albums (Schweizer Hitparade)	39
UK Albums (Official Charts)	12
US Billboard 200	6

=== Year-end charts ===
Chart (1999)	Position
US Billboard 200	170
Chart (2000)	Position
US Billboard 200	198

== Certifications and sales ==
Region	Certification	Certified units/sales
Australia (ARIA)	Gold	35,000^{^}
Canada (Music Canada)	Gold	50,000^{^}
United Kingdom (BPI)	Gold	100,000^{^}
United States (RIAA)	Platinum	1,100,000
^{^} Shipments figures based on certification alone.
