= Ann Hampton Callaway =

American singer

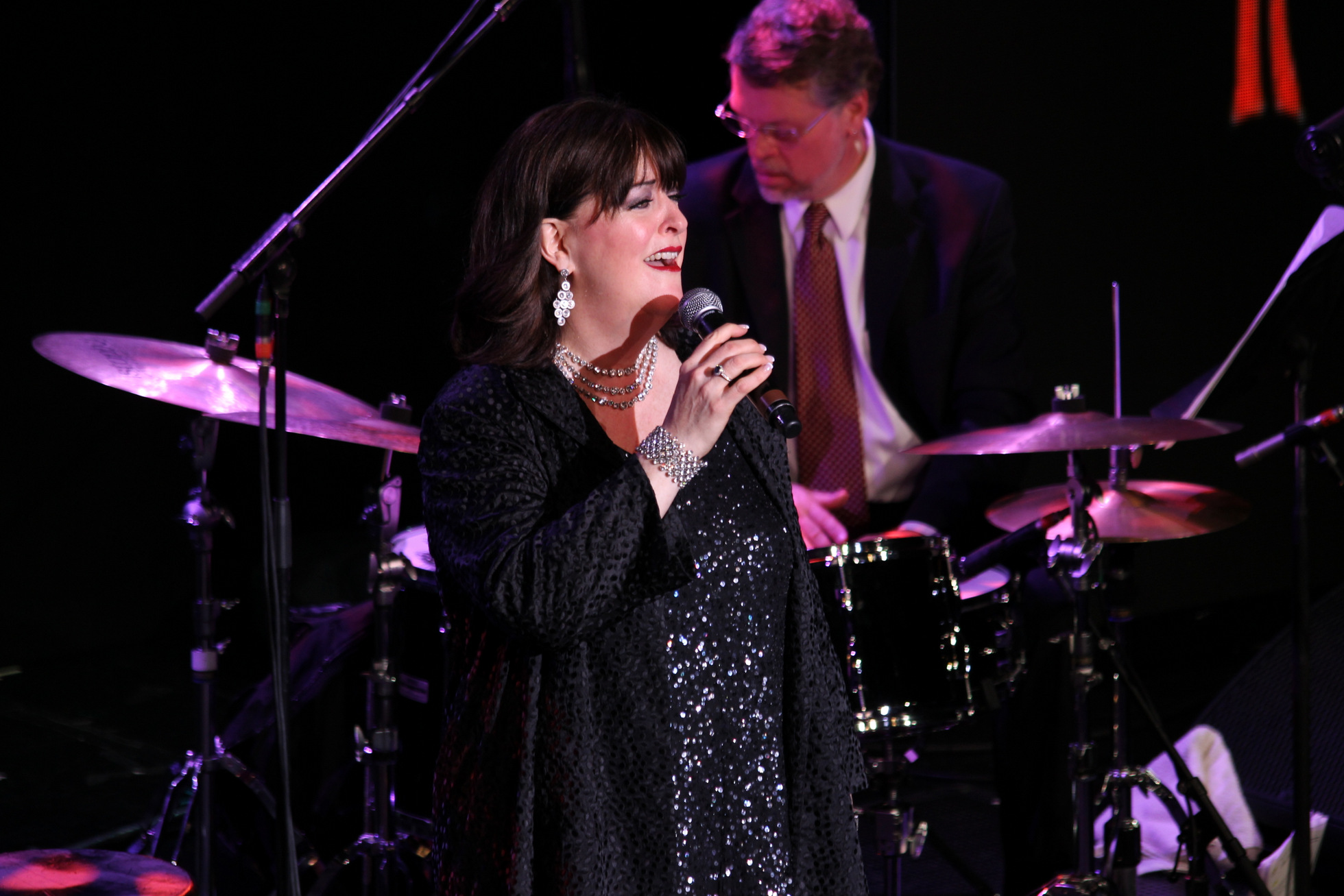
- Callaway in 2014

Background information
- Born: May 30, 1958 (age 68); Chicago, Illinois, U.S.
- Genres: Jazz, vocal jazz
- Occupations: Singer, songwriter, musician, actress
- Instruments: Vocals, piano
- Years active: 1990–present
- Labels: DRG, Shanachie, Telarc
- Website: www.annhamptoncallaway.com

Ann Hampton Callaway (born May 30, 1958) is an American jazz singer, songwriter, and actress. She wrote and sang the theme song for the TV series The Nanny.

== Career ==
Callaway is a native of Chicago. Her father, John Callaway, was a journalist and her mother was a singer, pianist, and vocal coach. She learned scat singing from her father and a love of jazz from his record collection, and she learned classical music from her mother. Her sister, Liz Callaway, is a singer and actress on Broadway. Callaway performed in musicals at New Trier High School in Winnetka. After graduation, she studied acting for two years at the University of Illinois at Urbana-Champaign. She moved to New York City in 1979. During the 1980s, she worked as a cabaret singer accompanying herself on piano, performing jazz, traditional pop, and standards from the Great American Songbook.

=== Songwriting ===
While contributing to a CD reissue of songs by Cole Porter, she received permission from the Porter estate to compose music for his unrecorded song, "I Gaze in Your Eyes." The song was included on her debut album, which was released on August 17, 1992. A year later, she wrote and performed the theme song for the TV show The Nanny.

In addition to the theme for The Nanny, she wrote theme songs for Day's End, Cabaret Beat, and The Jim J and Tammy Fay Show and composed incidental music for the play Baltimore Star by David Weiner. Her song "Manhattan in December" was included in the 2005 off-Broadway musical revue A Broadway Diva Christmas.

She composed "At the Same Time" for Barbra Streisand. The song appeared on Streisand's album, Higher Ground, which debuted at the top of the Billboard 200 and gave Callaway her first platinum record. Streisand asked her to write lyrics to a Rolf Lovland melody which she entitled "I've Dreamed of You" which Streisand sang to James Brolin at their wedding. The song was later recorded on her album, A Love Like Ours, released as a single, and selected for the album, The Essential Barbra Streisand. Streisand performed both songs on her live double album, Timeless. She chose Callaway's song "A Christmas Lullaby" for her album Christmas Memories.

Callaway's music and lyrics have also been recorded and performed by Karrin Allyson, Liz Callaway, Barbara Carroll, Blossom Dearie, Michael Feinstein, Harvey Fierstein, Carole King, Patti LuPone, Amanda McBroom, Donna McKechnie, Liza Minnelli, Peter Nero, and Lillias White.

In September 2005, Callaway performed her song "Let the Saints Come Marching" on a national TV broadcast on the Fox News Channel. She wrote the song in honor of victims of Hurricane Katrina. Her song "Who Can See the Blue the Same Again?" was released earlier in 2005 to raise money for survivors of the 2004 Indian Ocean earthquake and tsunami.

After the September 11 attacks, she composed "I Believe in America" and performed it on Larry King Live. Around the same time, she wrote "Let Us Be United", which was inspired by an 8,000-year-old prayer from the Rigveda. She recorded the song with Kenny Werner, the Siddha Yoga International Choir, and five-year-old Sonali Beaven, who sang in honor of her father who died on Flight 93. It was released on CD and DVD to benefit Save the Children and the PRASAD Project.

=== Other work ===
She appeared in the movie The Good Shepherd and in Volare for Jim Henson Productions, directed by Tamela D'Amico. Her voice has been heard in TV jingles and voice-overs, including spots for Coca-Cola, Ethan Allen, and State Farm. She has done extensive broadcasting for Sirius Satellite Radio as a performer, DJ, and interviewer.

She produced Singer's Spotlight with Ann Hampton Callaway featuring Liza Minnelli and Christine Ebersole. She starred in Midnight Swing for the PBS television special Live from Lincoln Center and was featured in another PBS special with Keith Lockhart and Boston Pops. She has also performed for the Macy's 4th of July Fireworks Spectacular and has made two appearances on Macy's Thanksgiving Day Parade.

== Awards and honors ==
She performed for U.S. President Bill Clinton in Washington, D.C., and was the invited guest performer for Soviet General Secretary Mikhail Gorbachev's Youth Peace Summit in Moscow in 1988.

In 2000, she received a nomination for the Tony Award for Best Performance by a Featured Actress in a Musical for her performance in Swing!

In 2023, Callaway was inducted into the Women Songwriters Hall of Fame.

== Personal life ==
Callaway's younger sister is Broadway and Animation Actress Liz Callaway

Callaway is married to her longtime partner Kari Strand and they currently live in Tucson, Arizona.

== Discography ==
=== Solo ===
- Ann Hampton Callaway (DRG, August 17, 1992)
- Bring Back Romance (DRG, September 25, 1994)
- To Ella with Love (Shanachie, August 13, 1996)
- Sibling Revelry with Liz Callaway (DRG, February 20, 1996)
- This Christmas (Angel, November 23, 1998)
- After Ours (Denon, August 19, 1997)
- Easy Living (Sin-Drome, October 26, 1999)
- Signature (N-Coded, February 12, 2002)
- Slow (Shanachie, August 24, 2004)
- Blues In The Night (Telarc, August 22, 2006)
- At Last (Telarc, February 3, 2009)
- Boom! Live at Birdland with Liz Callaway (PS Classics, July 11, 2011)
- From Sassy to Divine: The Sarah Vaughan Project (Shanachie, August 19, 2014)
- The Hope of Christmas (MCG, October 9, 2015)
- Jazz Goes to the Movies (Shanachie, October 19, 2018)
- Fever: A Peggy Lee Celebration (Palmetto, 2023)

=== As guest ===
- Kenny Barron, The Traveler (Sunnyside, 2008)
- Erich Kunzel, Tony DeSare, John Pizzarelli, Tierney Sutton, Christmastime Is Here (Telarc, 2006)
- Portia Nelson, This Life, Her Songs & Her Friends (DRG, 1996)
- Peter Nero, Holiday Pops (DRG, 2003)
- Johnny Mandel, The Man and His Music (Arbors, 2010)
