= Christian Hebel =

American violinist, songwriter, arranger and concertmaster (born 1975)

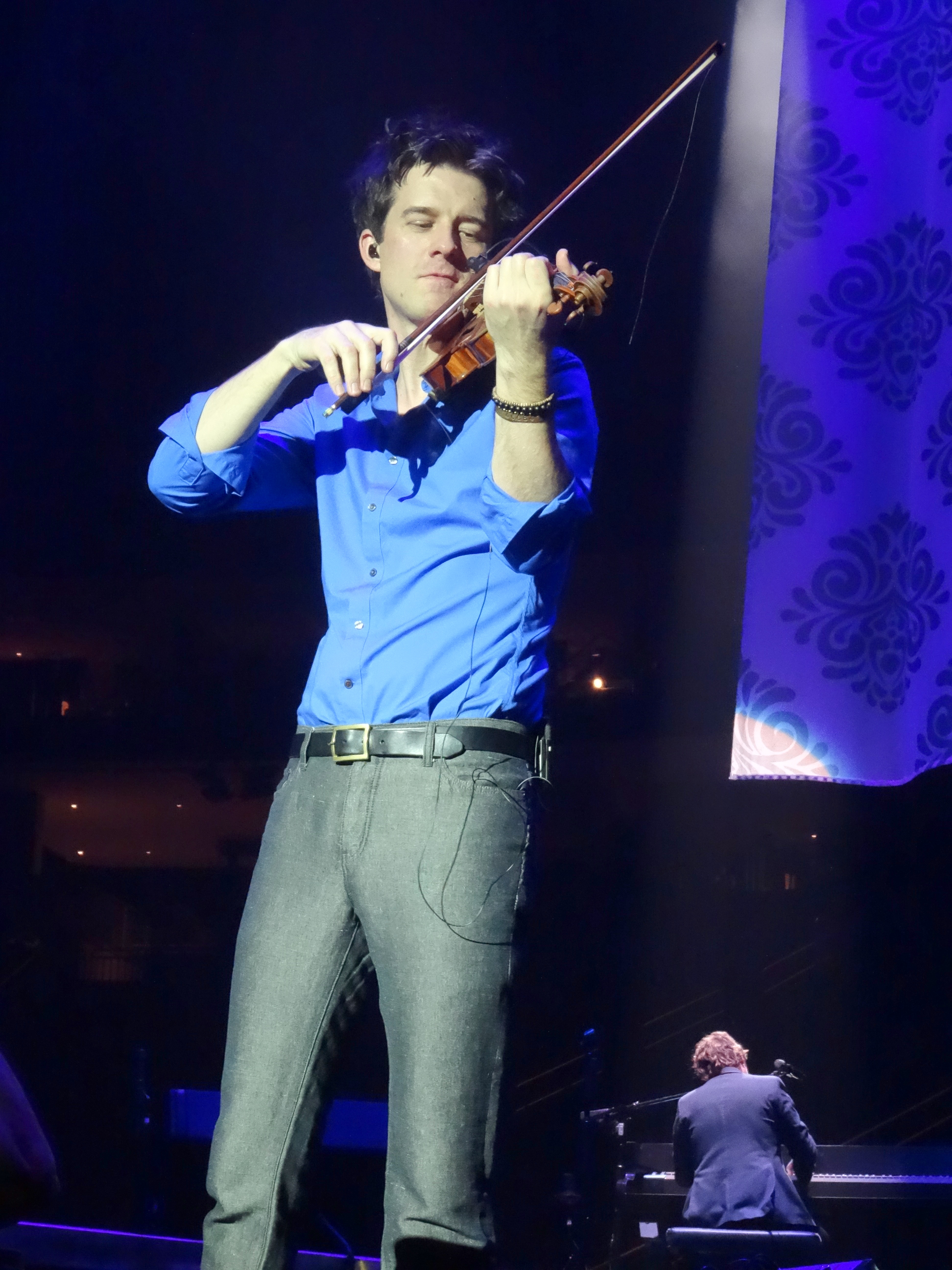
- Christian Hebel performing live with Josh Groban, November 2013

Background information
- Born: December 29, 1975 (age 50); Plymouth, Michigan, U.S.
- Origin: Los Angeles, California, U.S. New York City, New York, U.S.
- Genres: Pop; rock; jazz; classical; hip hop; bluegrass; film score; Broadway theatre; indie rock; indie pop
- Occupations: Violinist; songwriter; arranger; concertmaster
- Instrument: Violin
- Spouse: Rachael Harris (m. 2015; div. 2019)
- Website: www.christianhebel.com

Christian Hebel (born December 29, 1975) is an American violinist, songwriter, arranger and concertmaster. He has appeared on multi-Platinum, Gold, Emmy Award, Academy Awards, Tony Award, and Grammy Award winning recordings as well as film scores and Broadway theatre.

An accomplished live and recorded musician, Christian is also Artistic Director for the National YoungArts Foundation.

== Career ==
=== The Last Play at Shea with Billy Joel ===
In 2008, Hebel joined Billy Joel on his summer tour, culminating with two shows that were the final concerts at Shea Stadium before its demolition. The concerts were on July 16, 2008, and July 18, 2008 with guest performers including Tony Bennett, Don Henley, John Mayer, John Mellencamp, Steven Tyler, Roger Daltrey, Garth Brooks, and Paul McCartney. The concerts were featured in the 2010 documentary film The Last Play at Shea. The film was released on DVD on February 8, 2011. The CD and DVD of the show, Live at Shea Stadium: The Concert were released on March 8, 2011.

=== Rufus Does Judy at Carnegie Hall with Rufus Wainwright ===
Hebel worked with Rufus Wainwright in 2006 serving as Concertmaster for his sold-out tribute concerts at Carnegie Hall to American actress and singer Judy Garland, titled Rufus Does Judy at Carnegie Hall. The live concert recording was released as a two disc set through Geffen Records in December 2007 and earned a 2009 Grammy Award nomination for Best Traditional Pop Vocal Album.

=== With Barbra Streisand ===
In 2006, Hebel joined Barbra Streisand for her concert tour, Streisand: The Tour, which began on October 4, 2006 at the Wachovia Center in Philadelphia and concluded at Staples Center in Los Angeles on November 20, 2006. On April 25, 2009, CBS aired Streisand's latest television special, Streisand: Live in Concert, highlighting the featured stop from the 2006 North American tour in Fort Lauderdale, Florida. A selection of concerts was then released commercially.

In the summer of 2007, Hebel joined Streisand on her Barbra Live tour where she gave concerts for the first time in continental Europe. On October 11, 2012, he participated in Streisand's concert tour in front of 18,000 fans as part of the Hebel joined Streisand for a three-hour concert performance before a crowd of 18,000 in Barclays Center in Brooklyn (Streisand's first concert in her home borough). This included tributes to Donna Summer and Marvin Hamlisch.

Hebel performed on Streisand's September 2014 release of Partners, an album of duets that features collaborations with Elvis Presley, Andrea Bocelli, Stevie Wonder, Lionel Richie, Billy Joel, Babyface, Michael Bublé, Josh Groban, John Mayer, John Legend, Blake Shelton and Jason Gould. Hebel was also in the studio recording with Streisand in May 2016 on her album Encore: Movie Partners Sing Broadway, released in August of that year.

Hebel became Streisand's solo violinist in 2016 and joined her on her North American tour Barbra: The Music, The Mem'ries, The Magic. The tour initially visited nine locations in North America, then was extended to include four additional stops, for a total of 14 shows in 13 cities. Hebel is featured in a Netflix special that was filmed on tour.

=== American Music Awards- Rihanna & Ne-Yo ===
Hebel performed with Rihanna and Ne-Yo on the 2007 American Music Awards on November 18, 2007. They performed Rihanna's hit songs "Umbrella" and "Hate That I Love You" which were each nominated that night.

=== With Josh Groban ===
Josh Groban chose Hebel as his solo violinist in 2011 for the Straight to You Tour to promote his recent album Illuminations. Beginning May 12, 2011 and continuing through December of that year, they undertook an 81-city tour encompassing appearances in North America, Europe and South Africa.

Hebel appeared on Groban's next studio album, All That Echoes, released on February 5, 2013. Hebel joined Groban to promote the album with the All That Echoes World Tour in 2013 performing in North America, Europe and Australia. In 2014, Hebel joined Groban's Summer Symphony Tour where Hebel soloed with the Los Angeles Philharmonic, Colorado Symphony and Boston Pops among others.

=== Bruce Springsteen – Grammy Awards ===
On February 12, 2012, Hebel performed on stage with Bruce Springsteen and the E-Street Band to open the 54th Annual Grammy Awards live from Los Angeles, California on CBS.

=== George Benson ===
In 2015, Hebel began as Concertmaster and violin soloist with George Benson joining Benson on tour at venues and jazz festivals throughout Europe.

=== National YoungArts Foundation ===
Hebel began working with the National YoungArts Foundation in 2014 as an Artistic Director and Master Artist where he has directed performances at Baryshnikov Arts Center, New York Live Arts and will be directing an upcoming performance at The Kennedy Center. The National YoungArts Foundation identifies and nurtures the most accomplished young artists from across the United States ages 15–18 in the visual, literary, design and performing arts and is the sole nominator for the U.S. Presidential Scholar in the Arts.

== Broadway ==
=== Next to Normal ===
In 2005 Hebel originated and helped create the violin part in Tom Kitt and Brian Yorkey's American rock musical Next to Normal. The show had a record breaking run on Broadway around the world, won 3 Tony Awards in 2009, and the Pulitzer Prize in 2010.

Speaking of Hebel, Kitt describes "Christian provided the depth and virtuosity that I needed and helped me define what for me, would become one of the most important elements in the music".

=== American Idiot ===
In 2009 Hebel originated and helped create the violin role in Green Day's punk rock Broadway show American Idiot. The show went on to win 2 Tony Awards and won the Grammy Award in 2011 for Best Musical Show Album.

=== Wicked ===
Hebel originated and helped create the role of Concertmaster for the hit Broadway show Wicked in 2003. Hebel held the role of Concertmaster for over 12 years on Broadway where they won 3 Tony Awards and received a Grammy Award. On July 12, 2018, with its 6,138th performance, it surpassed A Chorus Line to become Broadway's sixth-longest running show. In March 2016, Wicked surpassed $1 billion in total Broadway revenue, joining both The Phantom of the Opera and The Lion King as the only Broadway shows to do so. In July 2017, Wicked surpassed The Phantom of the Opera as Broadway's second-highest grossing show, trailing only The Lion King.

=== The Light in the Piazza ===
Hebel originated and helped create the violin and concertmaster role in Craig Lucas and Adam Guettel's 2005 Broadway musical The Light in the Piazza. Hebel began work on the show in 2002 in New York City and performed in productions in Seattle in 2003 and on Broadway in 2005. The show was awarded 6 Tony Awards in 2005.

=== Sondheim On Sondheim ===
Hebel originated and helped create the violin part for Stephen Sondheim's Broadway show Sondheim On Sondheim in 2010 starring Barbara Cook and Vanessa Williams. The musical features interviews with Sondheim. The songs, including well-known, less-known and cut material, were from nineteen Sondheim shows (including student shows) produced over a 62-year period, including several songs from each of West Side Story, Company, Follies, A Funny Thing Happened on the Way to the Forum, Sunday in the Park with George, Merrily We Roll Along, Passion, and Into the Woods. Songs from his school years are included.

=== Spring Awakening ===
Hebel was the Music Coordinator for the 2015 Broadway production of Duncan Sheik's Grammy Award and Tony Award winning rock musical Spring Awakening.

== Discography ==
Hebel has achieved commercial success with both pop and classical albums.

=== Studio albums ===
Year	Album	Artist
2002	The Forgotten Conquest	Thom Jayne
2002	Wheel of Life	Stewart Francke
2003	Songs of Jason Robert Brown	Lauren Kennedy
2005	Tom Rogerson	Tom Rogerson
2005	At The Corner Of Broadway And Soul	Billy Porter
2005	Wearing Someone Else's Clothes	Jason Robert Brown
2006	Kingdom Come	Jay-Z
2006	I'm Not Waiting	Julia Murney
2007	Here And Now	Lauren Kennedy
2008	When The Wind Blows South	Philip Chaffin
2008	Jason Danieley & The Frontier Heroes	Jason Danieley
2008	Fifteen Seconds of Grace	Victoria Clark
2009	Greenwich Time	Rebecca Luker
2009	Crazy Love	Michael Bublé
2009	Passage Of Time	Liz Callaway
2011	My Lifelong Love	Georgia Stitt
2011	Songs of Innocence and Experience	Lisa Howard
2011	What Matters Most	Barbra Streisand
2012	Another Kind Of Light	Raissa Katona Bennett
2012	Music From The Movies	Katherine Jenkins
2012	Songs from the Silver Screen	Jackie Evancho
2013	To Be Loved	Michael Bublé
2013	All That Echoes	Josh Groban
2013	Back to Brooklyn	Barbra Streisand
2014	Aretha Franklin Sings the Great Diva Classics	Aretha Franklin
2014	Partners	Barbra Streisand
2015	Piece By Piece	Kelly Clarkson
2015	Brazilian Nights	Kenny G
2016	Nobody But Me	Michael Bublé

=== Live albums ===
Year	Album	Artist
2007	Live In Concert 2006	Barbra Streisand
2007	Rufus Does Judy at Carnegie Hall	Rufus Wainwright
2011	Live at Shea Stadium: The Concert	Billy Joel
2017	Barbra: The Music, The Mem'ries, The Magic	Barbra Streisand

=== Film Soundtracks and Broadway ===
Year	Album	Music by
2002	I'm with Lucy	Stephen Endelman
2003	Wicked (2003 Original Broadway Cast)	Stephen Schwartz
2005	The Light in the Piazza 2005 Original Broadway Cast	Adam Guettel
2005	Fantastic Four: The Album	John Ottman
2006	Winter Passing – Original Motion Picture Soundtrack	Eric Shimelonis
2006	Superman Returns (soundtrack)	John Ottman
2007	The Invasion (Official Soundtrack)	John Ottman
2007	Fantastic Four: Rise of the Silver Surfer (Official Soundtrack)	John Ottman
2007	Walk Hard: The Dewey Cox Story (soundtrack)	Michael Andrews
2008	Body Of Lies (Original Motion Picture Score)	Marc Streitenfeld
2008	Love on a Summer Afternoon : Songs of Sam Davis	Sam Davis
2008	Kitty's Kisses (Cast Recording)	Con Conrad
2009	Streisand: Live In Concert	Barbra Streisand
2009	Public Enemies (Official Soundtrack)	Elliot Goldenthal
2009	Cirque du Freak: The Vampire's Assistant	Stephen Trask
2009	Did You Hear About the Morgans?	Theodore Shapiro
2010	Tooth Fairy	George S. Clinton
2010	Sondheim on Sondheim	Stephen Sondheim
2010	Life Begins at 8:40	Harold Arlen
2010	True Grit	Carter Burwell
2010	Alice in Wonderland	Danny Elfman
2010	The Bounty Hunter	George Fenton
2010	Knight and Day	John Powell
2010	Sex and the City 2	Aaron Zigman
2010	The Wolfman	Danny Elfman
2010	The Social Network (soundtrack)	Trent Reznor and Atticus Ross
2011	The Trumpet of the Swan	Jason Robert Brown
2011	Sweet Bye and Bye (Cast Recording)	Vernon Duke
2011	Rise of the Planet of the Apes	Patrick Doyle
2011	Real Steel	Danny Elfman
2011	Moneyball	Mychael Danna
2011	Arthur	Theodore Shapiro and Mark Ronson
2011	Sucker Punch (soundtrack)	Tyler Bates and Marius de Vries
2011	Mildred Pierce	Carter Burwell
2012	Life of Pi: Original Motion Picture Soundtrack	Mychael Danna
2012	Dr. Seuss' The Lorax: Original Motion Picture Score	John Powell
2012	Men in Black 3	Danny Elfman
2013	The Last Five Years 2013 Off-Broadway Cast Recording	Jason Robert Brown
2013	Oz the Great and Powerful	Danny Elfman
2013	Planes (film) Original Motion Picture Soundtrack	Mark Mancina
2014	X-Men: Days of Future Past (Original Motion Picture Soundtrack)	John Ottman
2014	Tammy (Original Motion Picture Soundtrack)	Michael Andrews
2014	A Million Ways to Die in the West (Original Motion Picture Soundtrack)	Joel McNeely
2014	Rio 2: Music from the Motion Picture	John Powell
2014	The Pirate Fairy	Joel McNeely
2015	Barely Lethal (Original Motion Picture Soundtrack)	Mateo Messina
2015	The Walk (Original Motion Picture Soundtrack)	Alan Silvestri
2015	The Intern (Original Motion Picture Soundtrack)	Theodore Shapiro
2015	Tinker Bell and the Legend of the NeverBeast (Original Motion Picture Soundtrack)	Joel McNeely
2015	Focus (Original Motion Picture Soundtrack)	Nick Urata
2015	Night at the Museum: Secret of the Tomb (Original Motion Picture Soundtrack)	Alan Silvestri
2015	Paper Towns	Son Lux
2016	The Magnificent Seven (Original Motion Picture Soundtrack)	James Horner and Simon Franglen
2016	Almost Christmas (Original Motion Picture Soundtrack)	John Paesano
2016	Ghostbusters (Original Motion Picture Score)	Theodore Shapiro
2016	X-Men: Apocalypse (Original Motion Picture Soundtrack)	John Ottman
2016	The Book Of Love	Justin Timberlake
2016	Grease: Live	Jim Jacobs and Warren Casey
2017	Diary of a Wimpy Kid: The Long Haul	Ed Shearmur
2017	Fifty Shades Freed	Danny Elfman
2017	Ferdinand	John Powell
2018	Maze Runner: The Death Cure	John Paesano
2018	Love, Simon	Rob Simonsen
2018	Deadpool 2	Tyler Bates
2018	Christopher Robin	Jon Brion
2019	Wonder Park	Steven Price

=== Television ===
- Family Guy
- American Dad!
- Wonder Pets!
- Agents of S.H.I.E.L.D.
- The Orville
- Star Trek: Discovery
- Altered Carbon
- Daredevil
- Counterpart
- Grease: Live
- The Marvelous Mrs. Maisel
- Strange Angel
- Castle Rock
- The Umbrella Academy

== Personal life ==
Hebel and actress Rachael Harris were married on April 30, 2015 and they lived and worked in Los Angeles, California and New York City with their two sons Henry (b. 2016) and Otto (b. 2018). Harris filed for divorce from Hebel in 2019.
