= The Music...The Mem'ries...The Magic! =

Live album by Barbra Streisand
- Released: December 8, 2017
- Recorded: December 5, 2016
- Venue: American Airlines Arena (Miami, Florida)
- Genre: Vocal pop
- Length: 78:11 (standard); 109:45 (deluxe)
- Label: Columbia
- Producer: Barbra Streisand; Jay Landers

Barbra Streisand chronology
Encore: Movie Partners Sing Broadway (2016)	The Music...The Mem'ries...The Magic! (2017)	Walls (2018)

Professional ratings
Review scores
Source	Rating
AllMusic	4/5 stars

The Music...The Mem'ries...The Magic! is the ninth live album by American singer Barbra Streisand, recorded during the concert tour of the same name. Released by Columbia Records on December 8, 2017, the album sold 11,000 units in its first week in the United States (nearly all from traditional album sales). The Music...The Mem'ries...The Magic! received a nomination for Best Traditional Pop Vocal Album at the 61st Annual Grammy Awards.

== Track listing ==
The Music...The Mem'ries...The Magic! – Standard edition
No.	Title	Length
1.	"People" (Overture)	1:30
2.	"The Way We Were"	3:54
3.	"Everything"	4:06
4.	"Being at War with Each Other"	3:33
5.	"No More Tears (Enough Is Enough)"	2:14
6.	"Evergreen"	5:06
7.	"You Don't Bring Me Flowers"	3:28
8.	"Being Alive"	3:18
9.	"Papa, Can You Hear Me?"	5:17
10.	"Pure Imagination"	6:11
11.	"Who Can I Turn To (When Nobody Needs Me)" (with Anthony Newley)	3:50
12.	"Losing My Mind"	4:02
13.	"Isn't This Better"	2:38
14.	"How Lucky Can You Get"	4:15
15.	"Don't Rain on My Parade"	3:45
16.	"People"	4:22
17.	"Climb Ev'ry Mountain" (with Jamie Foxx)	6:22
18.	"Happy Days Are Here Again"	4:16
19.	"I Didn't Know What Time It Was"	6:04
Total length:		78:11

The Music...The Mem'ries...The Magic! – Deluxe edition
No.	Title	Length
1.	"People" (Overture)	1:30
2.	"The Way We Were"	3:31
3.	"Introductory Remarks"	2:20
4.	"Everything"	4:40
5.	"Being at War with Each Other"	3:33
6.	"No More Tears (Enough Is Enough)"	2:24
7.	"Evergreen"	5:06
8.	"You Don't Bring Me Flowers"	4:25
9.	"Being Alive"	4:34
10.	"Directing Movies"	3:07
11.	"Papa, Can You Hear Me?"	4:56
12.	"Pure Imagination"	6:11
13.	"Making Encore"	3:01
14.	"Who Can I Turn To (When Nobody Needs Me)" (with Anthony Newley)	3:48
15.	"Losing My Mind"	4:31
16.	"Isn't This Better"	2:38
17.	"How Lucky Can You Get"	4:15
18.	"Don't Rain on My Parade"	3:45
19.	"People"	4:22
20.	"Climb Ev'ry Mountain" (with Jamie Foxx)	7:03
21.	"Happy Days Are Here Again"	3:35
22.	"Jingle Bells?"	3:50
23.	"With One More Look at You"	6:11
24.	"I Didn't Know What Time It Was"	6:01
25.	"By the Way"	3:11
26.	"Children Will Listen"	3:36
27.	"Everything Must Change"	3:41
Total length:		109:45

== Charts ==
Chart performance for The Music...The Mem'ries...The Magic!
Chart (2017)	Peak position
Australian Albums (ARIA)	45
Belgian Albums (Ultratop Flanders)	133
Dutch Albums (Album Top 100)	69
New Zealand Heatseeker Albums (RMNZ)	6
Scottish Albums (OCC)	59
UK Albums (OCC)	65
US Billboard 200	69
