= Barbra Live =

2012–13 concert tour by Barbra Streisand

- Tour by Barbra Streisand
- Start date: October 8, 2012
- End date: June 22, 2013
- Legs: 3
- No. of shows: 2 in Asia; 6 in Europe; 12 in North America; 20 Total
- Box office: $66.3 million ($89.5 in 2024 dollars)

Barbra Streisand concert chronology
- Streisand (2006–07); Barbra Live (2012–13); Barbra: The Music, The Mem'ries, The Magic (2016)

Barbra Live was the sixth concert tour by American recording artist Barbra Streisand. Visiting North American and European markets, the tour was Streisand's first tour since 2006. Barbra Live was the 22nd best-selling tour in the world during 2012. It earned $40.7 million and sold 154,287 tickets.

In April 2013 it was officially announced that Streisand would continue the tour through Europe in the summer of 2013.

The shows at Brooklyn's Barclays Center were recorded and released for home media as Back to Brooklyn.

== Background ==
Initially planned as two shows to mark the opening of the new Barclays Center in Brooklyn, the show was billed as Barbra's Homecoming, since Streisand was born in Brooklyn. The shows sold out quickly and no further dates were added. On August 9, 2012 it was announced that Streisand would expand the series of concerts, opening in Philadelphia on October 8, 2012. On September 14, three additional engagements in America were added. One of these dates included the Hollywood Bowl, where Streisand's 1967 performance, An Evening with Barbra Streisand, broke the Bowl's attendance record at the time with an audience of 17,256 people.

== Reception ==
=== Critical ===
The concerts received mostly positive reviews and critical acclaim. The Ottawa Sun reviewed the concert at Scotiabank Place and wrote "Streisand's voice was truly exceptional. Intimate, yet on a grand scale, only she could do a concert that was small enough to feel personal, yet big enough to feel like a Broadway musical." Miriam Di Nunzio from the Chicago Sun-Times wrote "At 70, the singer still possesses one of the most pristine voices in music, a voice that completely and sumptuously envelops a room, even one the size of the cavernous United Center. There is an intimacy and honesty in Streisand's delivery – a rare treat in this age of lip-synched, overblown concert extravaganzas." The Jerusalem Post wrote on her opening night in Philadelphia, "Her voice (and cleavage) were better than many of the stars half her age that are currently touring." The Vancouver Sun stated that "The perennially decorated singer/actor/writer/director left an indelible mark on her Vancouver audience with a performance that was pure, undiluted class."

The show also garnered some negative reviews. The Oakland Tribune reviewed the San Jose concert at HP Pavilion and stated that Streisand relied too much on guest stars and wasted stage time with other performers. Jim Harrington wrote that the show "left too little time for what really should've been the focus of the night – Streisand's voice... I indeed look forward to seeing Streisand 'Some Other Time' and when it happens, hopefully she'll leave some of her friends and family members behind."

=== Commercial ===
The first shows at Brooklyn's Barclays Center sold out within a day of going on sale. After the show at the Hollywood Bowl sold out, an additional date was added. A second London show at The O_{2} Arena was added following the demand for the first show, which sold out quickly. A show in Paris was already on sale, but it was canceled to make time for a second show in Amsterdam.

== Set list ==
This set list is representative of the official DVD track listing. It does not represent all concerts for the duration of the tour.

1. "As If We’ve Never Said Goodbye"
2. "Nice 'n' Easy" / "That Face"
3. "The Way He Makes Me Feel"
4. "Bewitched, Bothered, and Bewildered"
5. "Didn’t We"
6. "Smile"
7. "Sam, You Made the Pants Too Long"
8. "No More Tears (Enough Is Enough)"
9. "The Way We Were" / "Through the Eyes of Love"
10. "Being Good Is Good Enough"
11. "Rose’s Turn" / "Some People" / "Don't Rain on My Parade"
12. "You're the Top"
13. "What'll I Do" / "My Funny Valentine"
14. "Lost Inside of You"
15. "Evergreen (Love Theme from A Star Is Born)"
16. "Nature Boy"
17. "How Deep Is the Ocean?"
18. "People"
19. "Here’s to Life"
20. "Make Our Garden Grow" / "Somewhere"
21. "Some Other Time"
22. "Happy Days Are Here Again"

== Shows ==
List of concerts, showing date, city, country, venue, special guest, tickets sold, number of available tickets and amount of gross revenue
Date	City	Country	Venue	Guest	Attendance	Revenue
North America
October 8, 2012	Philadelphia	United States	Wells Fargo Center	Chris Botti; Il Volo	12,158 / 12,158	$3,044,990
October 11, 2012	Brooklyn	United States	Barclays Center	Chris Botti; Il Volo	31,176 / 31,176	$9,327,948
October 13, 2012	Brooklyn	United States	Barclays Center	Chris Botti; Il Volo	31,176 / 31,176	$9,327,948
October 17, 2012	Montreal	Canada	Bell Centre	Chris Botti; Il Volo	9,997 / 9,997	$2,426,472
October 20, 2012	Ottawa	Canada	Scotiabank Place	Chris Botti; Il Volo	8,117 / 8,117	$1,893,484
October 23, 2012	Toronto	Canada	Air Canada Centre	Chris Botti; Il Volo	13,719 / 13,719	$3,781,896
October 26, 2012	Chicago	United States	United Center	Chris Botti; Il Volo	13,496 / 13,496	$3,894,605
October 29, 2012	Vancouver	Canada	Rogers Arena	Chris Botti; Il Volo	11,274 / 11,274	$2,652,666
November 2, 2012	Las Vegas	United States	MGM Grand Garden Arena	Chris Botti; Il Volo	9,856 / 9,856	$3,352,001
November 5, 2012	San Jose	United States	HP Pavilion at San Jose	Chris Botti; Il Volo	10,987 / 10,987	$2,472,870
November 9, 2012	Los Angeles	United States	Hollywood Bowl	Chris Botti; Il Volo	33,507 / 33,507	$7,810,238
November 11, 2012	Los Angeles	United States	Hollywood Bowl	Chris Botti; Il Volo	33,507 / 33,507	$7,810,238
Europe
June 1, 2013	London	England	The O_{2} Arena	Chris Botti	24,594 / 27,799	$7,323,650
June 3, 2013	London	England	The O_{2} Arena	Chris Botti	24,594 / 27,799	$7,323,650
June 6, 2013	Amsterdam	Netherlands	Ziggo Dome	Chris Botti; Jason Gould; Roslyn Kind	24,682 / 24,682	$6,417,017
June 10, 2013	Amsterdam	Netherlands	Ziggo Dome	Chris Botti; Jason Gould; Roslyn Kind	24,682 / 24,682	$6,417,017
June 12, 2013	Cologne	Germany	Lanxess Arena	Chris Botti; Jason Gould; Roslyn Kind	12,807 / 12,807	$2,459,429
June 15, 2013	Berlin	Germany	O_{2} World Berlin	Chris Botti; Jason Gould; Roslyn Kind	11,022 / 11,022	$2,728,471
Asia
June 20, 2013	Tel Aviv	Israel	Bloomfield Stadium	Chris Botti; Jason Gould; Roslyn Kind	27,566 / 27,566	$6,742,868
June 22, 2013	Tel Aviv	Israel	Bloomfield Stadium	Chris Botti; Jason Gould; Roslyn Kind	27,566 / 27,566	$6,742,868
Total					254,958 / 258,162 (98.7%)	$66,328,605
