= Barbra: The Music, The Mem'ries, The Magic =

2016–17 concert tour by Barbra Streisand

- Tour by Barbra Streisand
- Promotional poster
- Associated album: Encore: Movie Partners Sing Broadway
- Start date: August 2, 2016
- End date: May 6, 2017
- No. of shows: 16 in North America; 16 in total
- Box office: $53 million

Barbra Streisand concert chronology
- Barbra Live (2012-2013); Barbra: The Music, The Mem'ries, The Magic (2016–2017)

Barbra: The Music, The Mem'ries, The Magic was a concert tour by American recording artist Barbra Streisand. The tour initially visited nine locations in North America, then was extended twice for a total of 16 shows in 14 cities. The performance in Miami (December 5, 2016) was filmed for a Netflix release on November 22, 2017. A live album of the same name recorded during the concert tour was released on December 8, 2017.

== Critical response ==
Variety noted: At 74 years old, Streisand doesn’t always hit the power notes — as ironically evidenced in opening number, "The Way We Were" — but a few spots of pitchy imperfection could hardly detract from the sheer magic of watching a living icon return to the stage after a three-year absence, recounting her storied career through a varied set list that included tracks off each of her No. 1 selling albums, from "Stoney End" to "Woman in Love" to "No More Tears (Enough is Enough)", her disco-fied duet with the late Donna Summer.

Los Angeles Times: Barbra Streisand was working toward a moment — the end of the first act of the first show of her first concert tour in years — when she decided something wasn’t quite right. She’d just brought the house down at Staples Center with a thrilling, deeply felt rendition of Stephen Sondheim's "Being Alive," and now, in a demonstration of her range, Streisand's large band was easing into the hushed "Papa, Can You Hear Me?" from "Yentl," her movie about gender and Judaism in Eastern Europe in the early 1900s. Yet an adjustment was in order. Turning her attention to a small table near the edge of the stage, the singer picked up what looked like an unlit candle, turned the thing over and flipped a tiny switch. The decoration flickered to life.

NewsDay: When Barbra Streisand stepped onto the Barclays Center stage and almost immediately began belting out "The Way We Were," it was clear we were in for a daring show. Starting with a beloved showstopper is like throwing down the music gauntlet, promising that what is in store will surpass previous tours. And somehow Streisand delivered."This is what the evening is all about," as she launched into the classic, before adding, "Think of your memories too."The limited nine-city "Barbra: The Music . . . The Mem’ries . . . The Magic!" tour, which also includes another Barclays Center show Saturday, is in some ways a preview of her upcoming album Encore: Movie Partners Sing Broadway out on Aug. 26, which includes duets with Hugh Jackman, Alec Baldwin, Melissa McCarthy and others. But it's also a way for her to once again put her imprint on today's culture.

== Commercial reception ==
Ticket pre-sales began for American Express card members on May 18 for U.S. venues and May 19 for the Canadian venue; along with a pre-sale purchase fans received a copy of the new album. General public ticket sales began on May 25. Tickets prices ranged between $90 and $510.

The tour is presented by Live Nation Global Touring and S2BN Entertainment.

== Set list ==
This set list is representative of the performance on August 11, 2016. It does not represent all concerts for the duration of the tour.

- Act I
1. "The Way We Were"
2. "Everything"
3. "Being at War with Each Other" (Carole King)
4. "Everything Must Change" (Quincy Jones)
5. "Woman in Love"
6. "Stoney End" (Laura Nyro)
7. "No More Tears (Enough Is Enough)"
8. "Evergreen (Love Theme from A Star Is Born)" (with Babyface)
9. "You Don't Bring Me Flowers"
10. "Being Alive"
11. "Papa, Can You Hear Me?"
- Act II
12. "Pure Imagination" (with Seth MacFarlane)
13. "Who Can I Turn To (When Nobody Needs Me)" (with Anthony Newley)
14. "Losing My Mind"
15. "Loving You" (with Patrick Wilson)
16. "Climb Ev'ry Mountain" (with Jamie Foxx)
17. "Isn't This Better?"
18. "How Lucky Can You Get"
19. "With One More Look at You"/"Watch Closely Now"
20. "Children Will Listen"
21. "Don't Rain on My Parade"
22. "People"
23. "Happy Days Are Here Again"
24. "I Didn't Know What Time It Was"

== Tour dates ==
All dates were sold out. Attendance indicates theatre capacity.

Date	City	Country	Venue	Attendance	Revenue
August 2, 2016	Los Angeles	United States	Staples Center	13,557 / 13,557 (100%)	$3,806,180
August 4, 2016	San Jose	United States	SAP Center	11,367 / 11,367 (100%)	$2,687,997
August 6, 2016	Las Vegas	United States	T-Mobile Arena	12,946 / 12,946 (100%)	$3,535,905
August 9, 2016	Chicago	United States	United Center	13,748 / 13,748 (100%)	$3,780,492
August 11, 2016	Brooklyn	United States	Barclays Center	29,250 / 29,250 (100%)	$8,802,145
August 13, 2016	Brooklyn	United States	Barclays Center	29,250 / 29,250 (100%)	$8,802,145
August 16, 2016	Boston	United States	TD Garden	13,493 / 13,493 (100%)	$3,663,178
August 18, 2016	Washington, D.C.	United States	Verizon Center	12,101 / 12,101 (100%)	$3,152,751
August 20, 2016	Philadelphia	United States	Wells Fargo Center	13,963 / 13,963 (100%)	$3,529,637
August 23, 2016	Toronto	Canada	Air Canada Centre	13,140 / 13,140 (100%)	$2,481,950
November 27, 2016	Houston	United States	Toyota Center	11,591 / 11,591 (100%)	$3,022,440
November 30, 2016	Tampa	United States	Amalie Arena	10,035 / 10,035 (100%)	$2,413,705
December 3, 2016	Sunrise	United States	BB&T Center	12,262 / 12,262 (100%)	$3,247,670
December 5, 2016	Miami	United States	American Airlines Arena	10,071 / 10,071 (100%)	$2,080,785
May 4, 2017	Uniondale	United States	Nassau Coliseum	11,435 / 11,435 (100%)	$3,119,293
May 6, 2017	Brooklyn	United States	Barclays Center	14,464 / 14,464 (100%)	$3,682,129
Total				203,423 / 203,423 (100%)	$53,006,257
