= Back to Brooklyn (album) =

Live album by Barbra Streisand
- Released: November 25, 2013
- Recorded: October 11–13, 2012
- Venues: Barclays Center, New York City
- Genre: Vocal
- Label: Columbia

Barbra Streisand chronology
The Classic Christmas Album (2013)	Back to Brooklyn (2013)	Partners (2014)

Professional ratings
Review scores
Source	Rating
Allmusic	4/5 stars
New York Daily News	4/5 stars

Back to Brooklyn is the eighth live album by Barbra Streisand, recorded over two nights at Barclays Center during the Barbra Live tour in October 2012. Released November 25, 2013 in the US, the album peaked at number 189 on the Top Current Albums chart, and also charted in Belgium, the Netherlands, Germany, and the United Kingdom.

Footage from the 1981 documentary short I Remember Barbra appears in bridging segments during the production, offering vintage interviews with Brooklyn locals.

== Track listing ==
=== DVD ===
1. "Back to Brooklyn"
2. "As If We Never Said Goodbye"
3. "I Remember Brooklyn (Dialogue)"
4. "Nice 'N' Easy" / "That Face"
5. "The Way He Makes Me Feel"
6. "Bewitched, Bothered and Bewildered"
7. "Didn't We"
8. "Smile" (feat. Il Volo)
9. "Q&A"
10. "Sam, You Made The Pants Too Long"
11. "No More Tears (Enough is Enough)"
12. "The Way We Were" / "Through The Eyes of Love"
13. "Being Good Isn't Good Enough"
14. "Rose's Turn" / "Some People" / "Don't Rain on My Parade"
15. "I Remember Barbra"
16. "You're the Top"
17. "What I'll Do" / "My Funny Valentine"
18. "Lost Inside of You"
19. "Evergreen"
20. "Nature Boy"
21. "How Deep Is the Ocean?"
22. "People"
23. "Here's to Life"
24. "Make Our Garden Grow" / "Somewhere"
25. "Some Other Time"
26. "Happy Days Are Here Again"

=== CD ===
1. "I Remember Barbra #1"
2. "As If We Never Said Goodbye"
3. "Nice 'N' Easy" / "That Face"
4. "The Way He Makes Me Feel"
5. "Bewitched, Bothered and Bewildered"
6. "Didn't We"
7. "Marvin Hamlisch Intro"
8. "The Way We Were" / "Through the Eyes of Love"
9. "Jule Styne Intro"
10. "Being Good Isn't Good Enough"
11. "Rose's Turn" / "Some People" / "Don't Rain on My Parade"
12. "I Remember Barbra #2"
13. "You're the Top"
14. "What I'll Do" / "My Funny Valentine"
15. "Lost Inside of You"
16. "Evergreen"
17. "Jason Gould Intro"
18. "How Deep Is the Ocean?"
19. "People"
20. "Here's to Life Intro"
21. "Here's to Life"
22. "Make our Garden Grow"
23. "Some Other Time Intro"
24. "Some Other Time"

== Weekly charts ==
Chart (2013–14)	Peak position
Belgian Albums (Ultratop Flanders)	106
Belgian Albums (Ultratop Wallonia)	106
Dutch Albums (Album Top 100)	56
German Albums (Offizielle Top 100)	92
UK Albums (OCC)	102
US Top Current Albums (Billboard)	189
