= Encore: Movie Partners Sing Broadway =

Studio album by Barbra Streisand
- Released: August 26, 2016
- Recorded: Summer 2015–Spring 2016
- Studio: AIR (London); Angel (London); Barbra Streisand Scoring Stage (Culver City, California); The Chandelier Room (Bell Canyon, California); Grandma's House (Malibu, California); Momentum (Santa Monica, California); MSR (New York); Newman Scoring Stage (Los Angeles); The Village (Los Angeles); WallyWorld (Studio City, California); Westlake (Los Angeles); Woodshed (Malibu, California)
- Genre: Traditional pop; vocal pop; show tunes
- Length: 43:41
- Label: Columbia
- Producer: Walter Afanasieff; Barbra Streisand

Barbra Streisand chronology
Partners (2014)	Encore: Movie Partners Sing Broadway (2016)	The Music...The Mem'ries...The Magic! (2017)

Singles from Encore: Movie Partners Sing Broadway
- 1. "At the Ballet" Released: June 10, 2016

Encore: Movie Partners Sing Broadway is the thirty-fifth studio album by American singer Barbra Streisand, released on August 26, 2016, by Columbia Records. Encore is her third studio album of Broadway songs and featured duets with several well-known actors including Jamie Foxx, Melissa McCarthy, among others. The album was promoted with the release of "At the Ballet" as a single.

Encore debuted at the top of the US Billboard 200 chart, extending Streisand's record as the woman with the most number-one albums in chart history, and the oldest woman to top the chart. The album also reached number one in Australia and the United Kingdom, where it became her third and seventh chart-topper respectively. Encore: Movie Partners Sing Broadway received a nomination for Best Traditional Pop Vocal Album at the 59th Annual Grammy Awards in February 2017.

== Commercial performance ==
Professional ratings
Review scores
Source	Rating
AllMusic	3.5/5 stars
Entertainment Weekly	B
The Guardian	4/5 stars
The Huffington Post	Favorable
Metro Weekly	3/4 stars
Newsday	A−
NPR Music	Favorable
Yahoo! Movies	Unfavorable
USA Today	Favorable
The Times	Favorable

The first leg of Barbra: The Music, The Mem'ries, The Magic concert tour preceded the album release, helping promote the duets collection. Encore: Movie Partners Sing Broadway debuted at number one on the Billboard 200, selling 149,000 album-equivalent units in its first week, of which 148,000 were pure sales. Of that figure, physical album sales (CDs and vinyl LPs) equated to 126,000, the largest sales week for a physical album in 2016. Previously, Blink-182's California held the biggest physical week for an album of 2016, with 107,000 sold. Encore extended her record for the most number one albums among women, tying her with Bruce Springsteen for the third-most among all acts. The only artists with more number ones are The Beatles (with 19) and Jay Z (with 13).

Streisand also surpassed her own record for the longest span between number ones on the Billboard 200 as Encore arrived 51 years and 10 months after her first chart-topper, People, spent its initial week at number one (October 31, 1964). Further, Streisand continued to be the only act to have achieved number one albums in the last six decades (1960s–2010s).

The album debuted at number one on the UK Albums Chart with combined units of 20,000 in its first week, giving Streisand her seventh number one album in the United Kingdom. With that achievement, Streisand ranks second as the female solo artist with the most number one albums in UK, behind only Madonna, who has twelve number one albums. The feat was later broken by Kylie Minogue, who has eight number one albums. It also peaked at number 3 in Canada, selling 10,318 copies in its first week. The album debuted at number one spot in Australia, making it her third number one album there.

Encore was the 45th best-selling album of 2016, according to IFPI, selling 600,000 that year.

== Track listing ==
Standard edition
No.	Title	Writer(s)	Duet partner	Length
1.	"At the Ballet" (from A Chorus Line, 1975)	Edward Kleban, Marvin Hamlisch	Anne Hathaway and Daisy Ridley	7:30
2.	"Loving You" (from Passion, 1994)	Stephen Sondheim	Patrick Wilson	3:30
3.	"Who Can I Turn To (When Nobody Needs Me)" (from The Roar of the Greasepaint – The Smell of the Crowd, 1964)	Leslie Bricusse, Anthony Newley	Anthony Newley	4:24
4.	"The Best Thing That Has Ever Happened" (from Road Show, 2003)	Sondheim	Alec Baldwin	3:13
5.	"Any Moment Now" (from an unproduced version of Smile, 1986)	Marvin Hamlisch, Carolyn Leigh	Hugh Jackman	4:45
6.	"Anything You Can Do" (from Annie Get Your Gun, 1946)	Irving Berlin	Melissa McCarthy	3:12
7.	"Pure Imagination" (from Charlie and the Chocolate Factory, 1971)	Bricusse, Newley	Seth MacFarlane	4:12
8.	"Take Me to the World" (from Evening Primrose, 1966)	Sondheim	Antonio Banderas	4:16
9.	"I'll Be Seeing You"/"I've Grown Accustomed to Her Face" (from Right This Way, 1938; and My Fair Lady, 1956)	Irving Kahal, Sammy Fain/Alan Jay Lerner, Frederick Loewe	Chris Pine	4:41
10.	"Climb Ev'ry Mountain" (from The Sound of Music, 1959)	Richard Rodgers, Oscar Hammerstein II	Jamie Foxx	4:01

Deluxe edition: additional solo tracks
No.	Title	Writer(s)	Duet partner	Length
1.	"At the Ballet" (from A Chorus Line)	Kleban, Hamlisch	Anne Hathaway and Daisy Ridley	7:30
2.	"Loving You" (from Passion)	Sondheim	Patrick Wilson	3:30
3.	"Who Can I Turn To (When Nobody Needs Me)" (from The Roar of the Greasepaint – The Smell of the Crowd)	Bricusse, Newley	Anthony Newley	4:24
4.	"Any Moment Now" (from an unproduced version of Smile)	Hamlisch, Leigh	Hugh Jackman	4:45
5.	"I Didn't Know What Time It Was" (from Too Many Girls, 1939)	Rodgers, Lorenz Hart		5:48
6.	"The Best Thing That Has Ever Happened" (from Road Show)	Sondheim	Alec Baldwin	3:13
7.	"Not a Day Goes By" (from Merrily We Roll Along, 1981)	Sondheim		3:19
8.	"Anything You Can Do" (from Annie Get Your Gun)	Berlin	Melissa McCarthy	3:12
9.	"Fifty Percent" (from Ballroom, 1978)	Billy Goldenberg, Alan and Marilyn Bergman		4:26
10.	"I'll Be Seeing You"/"I've Grown Accustomed to Her Face" (from Right This Way and My Fair Lady)	Kahal, Fain/Lerner, Loewe	Chris Pine	4:41
11.	"Losing My Mind" (from Follies, 1971)	Sondheim		3:56
12.	"Pure Imagination" (from Charlie and the Chocolate Factory)	Bricusse, Newley	Seth MacFarlane	4:12
13.	"Take Me to the World" (from Evening Primrose)	Sondheim	Antonio Banderas	4:16
14.	"Climb Ev'ry Mountain" (from The Sound of Music)	Rodgers, Hammerstein	Jamie Foxx	4:01

== Personnel ==
Musicians

- Barbra Streisand – vocals
- Mike Lang – celeste
- Bruce Dukov – concertmaster
- Gayle Levant – harp
- Luis Conte – Latin percussion
- Robert Zimmitti – percussion
- Ed Meares – principal bass
- Rose Corrigan – principal bassoon
- Stuart Clark – principal clarinet
- Heather Clark – principal flute
- Steven Becknell – principal French horn
- Leslie Reed – principal oboe
- Alex Iles – principal trombone
- Jon Lewis – principal trumpet
- Brian Dembow – principal viola
- Tamara Hatwan – principal second viola
- Don Williams – timpani
- Walter Afanasieff – synthesizer (tracks 1–3, 5, 7–10), piano (1–3, 5, 6, 8, 10), percussion (1, 5, 7, 9, 10), bass (2, 3, 6, 7, 10), drums (4–6, 9), string and horn arrangement (6)
- Dean Parks – guitar (tracks 1, 4, 5, 9)
- Chuck Berghofer – bass guitar (tracks 1, 4, 9)
- Vinnie Colaiuta – drums (tracks 1, 4, 9)
- Nathan East – bass guitar (tracks 2, 3, 5, 8)
- Missi Hale – backing vocals (tracks 4, 5, 7)
- Luke Edgemon – backing vocals (tracks 4, 5, 7)
- Randy Waldman – piano (tracks 4, 9)
- Tim Pierce – guitar (track 4)
- Andrew Synowiec – guitar (track 6)
- Sal Lozano – saxophone (track 6)
- Chris Walden – string and horn arrangement (track 6)

Technical

- Barbra Streisand – production, direction, arrangement
- Walter Afanasieff – production, arrangement
- Dave Reitzas – mastering, mixing, recording
- Matt Ward – orchestra recording
- Adam Ayan – mastering
- Tyler Gordon – engineering
- Adrian Bradford – additional engineering
- Alex Hendrickson – additional engineering

Visuals

- Barbra Streisand – art direction, liner notes
- Jeri Heiden – design
- Russel James – photography
- Jay Landers – studio photos, liner notes

== Charts ==
=== Weekly charts ===
Chart (2016)	Peak position
Argentine Albums (CAPIF)	18
Australian Albums (ARIA)	1
Austrian Albums (Ö3 Austria)	2
Belgian Albums (Ultratop Flanders)	12
Belgian Albums (Ultratop Wallonia)	22
Canadian Albums (Billboard)	3
Czech Albums (ČNS IFPI)	18
Dutch Albums (Album Top 100)	9
French Albums (SNEP)	80
German Albums (Offizielle Top 100)	23
Greek Albums (IFPI)	28
Hungarian Albums (MAHASZ)	18
Irish Albums (IRMA)	15
Italian Albums (FIMI)	12
New Zealand Albums (RMNZ)	2
Polish Albums (ZPAV)	23
Scottish Albums (OCC)	1
South Korean Albums (Gaon)	80
South Korean Albums International (Gaon)	8
Spanish Albums (Promusicae)	4
Swiss Albums (Schweizer Hitparade)	24
Taiwanese Albums (Five Music)	3
UK Albums (OCC)	1
US Billboard 200	1
US Top Internet Albums (Billboard)	1

=== Year-end charts ===
Chart (2016)	Position
Australian Albums (ARIA)	43
US Billboard 200	127

== Certifications ==
Region	Certification	Certified units/sales
Australia (ARIA)	Gold	35,000^{^}
Summaries
Worldwide	—	600,000
^{^} Shipments figures based on certification alone.
