= Pure Imagination =

Song by Gene Wilder

from the album Willy Wonka & the Chocolate Factory (Music from the Original Soundtrack of the Paramount Picture)
- Released: 1971
- Length: 4:20
- Label: Paramount
- Songwriters: Leslie Bricusse, Anthony Newley

"Pure Imagination" is a song from the 1971 film Willy Wonka & the Chocolate Factory. It was written by British composers Leslie Bricusse and Anthony Newley specifically for the movie. It was sung by Gene Wilder, who played the character of Willy Wonka. Bricusse has stated that the song was written over the phone in one day. The song has a spoken introduction.

Since its release, the song has been covered and remixed hundreds of times by a wide variety of artists. The original song was not popular when it was first released. The film itself was not a blockbuster and other songs from the soundtrack performed better. It was not until the movie began appearing on television reruns in the 1980s that the film and "Pure Imagination" became more well known. Although the original song never charted, some cover versions have done so.

In the week following Wilder's death in 2016, the song rose in streams and sales by more than 1000%. The song was featured in television, radio, and social media tributes to Wilder including Coldplay who performed the song at the Pepsi Center in Denver, Colorado on August 29, 2016. While it was absent from the 2005 film adaptation Charlie and the Chocolate Factory, the song was featured in the 2023 prequel film Wonka, both in its promotional materials and the film itself, sung by Timothée Chalamet as Wonka.

== Notable cover versions ==
- Lou Rawls covered the song for his 1976 album All Things in Time.
- Ben Vereen covered the song on season 1 episode 17 of The Muppet Show, January 1977.
- Bob James covered the song for his 1977 album, BJ4.
- Gary Valenciano covered the song for his 1986 movie, Horsey Horsey, Tigidig-Tigidig, during one of Belinda's fantasy where they ride on a back of flying horse with her husband and their friend Johnny, Eddie and Gringo (portrayed by Tito, Vic and Joey respectively).
- In 1997, jazz pianist Bill Charlap recorded a solo piano version of the song on his album All Through the Night (Criss Cross Jazz 1153).
- In 2011, the song made its first entry into the Billboard Hot 100 when it was covered by the cast of the TV series Glee. (US No. 59)
- In September 2013, the song was featured in a Chipotle short film, sung by Fiona Apple. (US No. 104)
- Ruby Arias (portrayed by Emma Tremblay) sang the song for a school concert in the Supergirl episode "The Faithful".
- An instrumental version of the song is featured in the 2017 Marvel Studios film Thor: Ragnarok.
- In the Charlie and the Chocolate Factory musical, every production except the London version, which has it in the Great Glass Elevator, has Willy Wonka sing it in the Chocolate Room.
- Barbra Streisand recorded the song as a duet with Seth MacFarlane for her 2016 album Encore: Movie Partners Sing Broadway.
- Jazz pianist Bill Cunliffe recorded it with his 7 piece band Imaginacion on his recording Imaginacion, on Torii Records in 2005
- Harry Connick, Jr. covered the song on his 2001 album Songs I Heard.
