= Streisand (tour) =

2006–07 concert tour by Barbra Streisand

- Tour by Barbra Streisand
- Promotional image for tour
- Start date: October 4, 2006
- End date: July 25, 2007
- Legs: 2
- No. of shows: 20 in North America; 9 in Europe; 29 Total
- Box office: $119.5 million ($185.55 in 2025 dollars)

Barbra Streisand concert chronology
- Timeless (1999–2000); Streisand (2006–2007); Barbra Live (2012-2013)

Streisand was Barbra Streisand's Fall 2006 North American concert tour. Comprising 26 shows, it was Streisand's first United States tour since 2000 and her first live concert events since her supposed farewell concerts, Timeless in 2000. The 2006 tour also marked the singer's first time playing in Canadian markets.

In early May 2007 it was announced that Streisand would take the show to Europe. This was her first full length European tour and took place during the months of June and July 2007.

== Background ==
The tour was officially announced on June 12, 2006, after months of speculation. It opened on October 4 in Philadelphia at the Wachovia Center. The tour was presented by promoter Michael Cohl for Concert Productions International and The Next Adventure (A Live Nation Company). Ticket prices for some venues were as much as US$750, and even higher for VIP tickets.

The operatic pop group Il Divo appeared as her special guest; they performed three songs with Streisand as well as their own three song set in the middle of the concert.

The concert tour was one of the most anticipated tours of the year. Ticket sales were very strong with the Toronto show selling out in 30 minutes and 12,000 seats at the Montréal show selling out in the first day on sale.

The October 28 show and the October 30 show in Sunrise, Florida was recorded in high definition for a Showtime television special and confirmed a DVD release on April 28, 2009, as Barbra Streisand: The Concerts which included the 2006 tour filmed at BankAtlantic Center in Sunrise, Florida and the 1994 Concert filmed at Arrowhead Pond of Anaheim in Anaheim, California.

A double album, Live in Concert 2006, was released on May 8, 2007, and contained songs recorded during the New York City, Washington, D.C., and Sunrise concerts.

The show was number seven in the top 10 tours of Billboard's year-end charts for 2006 with a total gross of $76,112,426. The tour went on to gross $$92 million.

In early May 2007, it was announced that Streisand would tour Europe after a 13-year absence. "What a joy it will be to perform in so many wonderful countries for the first time," said Streisand. "I can't wait to experience these different audiences and different cultures." A 58 piece orchestra accompanied Streisand as she performed many of the classic songs from her repertoire such as "Evergreen", "People", "The Way We Were" and "Don’t Rain on My Parade".

== Ticket fraud ==
On August 30, 2006, it was announced that more than 1,000 tickets to various dates of Streisand's North American tour were invalidated because they were purchased with stolen credit card information and then put up for sale on various ticket resale sites.

== The show ==
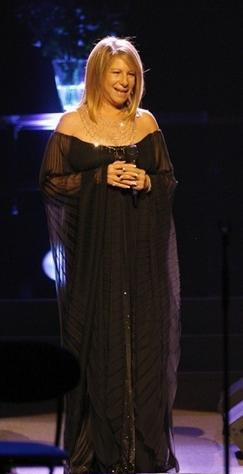
Streisand performing in July 2007 at The O2 Arena in London

The show was heavy on standards, one of the highlights being a Funny Girl medley. Il Divo performed three songs between acts, as well as songs with Streisand.

The stage was an open platform with four stations of flowers and tea. Streisand entered from the center, rising platform. She wore a black sequin outfit with a slit skirt for the first half of the show and a black gown and shawl with gold trim after the interval. However, beginning at the first New York concert, the second half of the show now featured Streisand wearing a black pant suit. She sat at a tall swivel chair at the front of the stage and at different times during the two and a half hour show moves upstage on a series of walkways through the orchestra.

The tour's opening concert at the Wachovia Center was the highest single event gross in the 10-year history of the arena. The concert grossed $5.4 million from 18,714 paid attendance.

The Columbus Dispatch said of the set up: "The arena had a retro look—configured like a giant nightclub, with long, tiered, lighted runways extending well out into the hall and surrounding a full symphony orchestra. A small table with a vase of flowers was placed front and center, and after Streisand came onstage—lifted via a small elevator smack into the middle of a spotlight—she worked this part of the stage, closest to her adoring audience."

Streisand also held a Q&A session with the audience during the second act.

One of the most talked about parts of the show was a skit where comedic impressionist Steve Bridges playing President George W. Bush uttered such lines as, "I'm concerned about the national debt, so I'm selling Canada", and "If I cared about the polls I would have run for President of Poland." The two end the skit by harmonizing on the "Get Happy/Happy Days Are Here Again"" duet that Streisand and Judy Garland once did together.

At the October 9 New York show, this skit drew some jeers from the audience, who appeared to be impatient with the political satire. Streisand shot back, "Why don't you shut the fuck up. If you can't take a joke, why don't you leave and get your money back." The assertive response, which she later apologized for by saying, "I'm sorry. I shouldn't have lost it", got the audience back on her side. Bridges did not appear at the November 7, 2006, show at Chicago's United Center due to a previously scheduled Election Night engagement.

== Europe ==
For the European tour a number of changes were made. The group Il Divo were replaced by a group of four Broadway singers, Sean McDermott, Michael Arden, Peter Lockyer, and Hugh Panaro, who performed a different selection of songs. The Steve Bridges segment was dropped for the European Audience. A few changes were made to the set list, with "Carefully Taught" and "Children Will Listen" being replaced by Papa Can You hear Me? taken from the film Yentl. Another addition was "You Don't Bring Me Flowers".

== Commercial reception ==
The North American tour was a huge success. The 20 concerts grossed $92,457,062 and set house gross records in 14 of the 16 arenas played on the tour.

In Europe the tour faced controversy when the first show set in Rome's Stadio Flaminio was struggling to sell top-priced tickets and citizens calling Streisand to cancel the show after outrageous prices became known. The show in Nice, France at Stade Charles Ehrmann also was cancelled after few weeks of being on sale, the promoter not giving any real reason for the cancellation. In Stockholm, Sweden the show at Globen arena for July 4 was cancelled after Streisand's doctor advised her not to go on stage but rather rest her voice continued the rumors of lacking ticket sales again. The tour also gathered more positive news in Berlin, where Streisand performed at the Waldbühne Amphitheater to a crowd of over 17,000. In Paris she was honoured with a medal of the Legion of Honour by President Nicolas Sarkozy.

== Set list ==
The following set list is obtained from the November 20, 2006 show in Los Angeles. It's not intended to represent all dates throughout the show.

1. "Funny Girl Overture" (musical intro)
2. "Starting Here, Starting Now"
3. "Down with Love"
4. "The Way We Were"
5. "Ma Premiere Chanson"
6. "Evergreen" (with Il Divo)
7. "Unchained Melody" / "Un-Break My Heart" / "My Way" (Il Divo interlude)
8. "Come Rain or Come Shine"
9. "Funny Girl"
10. "The Music That Makes Me Dance"
11. "My Man"
12. "People"

Intermission

1. "The Music of the Night" (with Il Divo)
2. "Carefully Taught" / "Children Will Listen"
3. "Unusual Way"
4. "What Are You Doing the Rest of Your Life?"
5. "Woman In The Moon"
6. "(Have I Stayed) Too Long at the Fair?"
7. "A Cockeyed Optimist"
8. "Somewhere (with Il Divo)
9. "My Shining Hour

Encore

23. Don't Rain on My Parade
24. Happy Days Are Here Again
25. Smile
Notes
- Il Divo performed "Passera" during the shows in Philadelphia, Columbus, and New York City.
- “Smile” and “Woman In The Moon” weren’t performed during select dates.
- From October 4 to 28, “When the Sun Comes Out” was performed.
- During both nights in New York City, Toronto, and Sunrise, Streisand performed Laura Nyro’s “Stoney End”. It was additionally sung acapella during the show in St. Paul.
- During the first show in Toronto, Streisand performed “Where or When”.
- “Nobody’s Heart (Belongs to Me)” was sung during the first performance in Sunrise.
- Starting with the Zurich concert, “Papa, Can You Hear Me?”, “I Finally Found Someone”, and “You Don't Bring Me Flowers” were added to the set list.
- “You've Got to Be Carefully Taught”, “Happy Days Are Here Again”, and “Children Will Listen”, were temporarily cut from the set list from June 18 to July 14. They were permanently removed after the first London concert.
- “Come Rain or Come Shine” wasn’t performed during the Zurich and London concerts.
- “Down With Love” was cut from the set list during shows in Celbridge and Vienna.
- Streisand performed “The Summer Knows”, from Summer of '42, during the concerts in Berlin and Paris.
- “I’ve Dreamed of You” was performed during the first London show and the performance in Celbridge.

== Tour dates ==
List of 2006 concerts
Date	City	Country	Venue	Attendance	Revenue
October 4, 2006	Philadelphia	United States	Wachovia Center	18,714 / 18,714	$5,415,748
October 6, 2006	Columbus	United States	Value City Arena	10,508 / 12,418	$2,206,045
October 9, 2006	New York City	United States	Madison Square Garden	33,514 / 33,514	$11,313,050
October 11, 2006	New York City	United States	Madison Square Garden	33,514 / 33,514	$11,313,050
October 13, 2006	Washington, D.C.	United States	Verizon Center	14,416 / 14,416	$3,974,992
October 15, 2006	Montreal	Canada	Bell Centre	18,426 / 18,426	$4,323,060
October 17, 2006	Toronto	Canada	Air Canada Centre	36,223 / 36,223	$8,980,992
October 20, 2006	Toronto	Canada	Air Canada Centre	36,223 / 36,223	$8,980,992
October 22, 2006	Boston	United States	TD Banknorth Garden	14,807 / 14,807	$4,766,650
October 24, 2006	Saint Paul	United States	Xcel Energy Center	14,044 / 14,044	$2,628,150
October 28, 2006	Sunrise	United States	BankAtlantic Center	31,931 / 31,931	$9,572,573
October 30, 2006	Sunrise	United States	BankAtlantic Center	31,931 / 31,931	$9,572,573
November 2, 2006	Atlanta	United States	Philips Arena	14,538 / 14,538	$3,855,784
November 4, 2006	Atlantic City	United States	Boardwalk Hall	12,639 / 12,639	$5,563,400
November 7, 2006	Chicago	United States	United Center	28,787 / 28,787	$8,980,992
November 9, 2006	Chicago	United States	United Center	28,787 / 28,787	$8,980,992
November 13, 2006	San Jose	United States	HP Pavilion	14,757 / 14,757	$4,619,900
November 16, 2006	Phoenix	United States	US Airways Center	14,562 / 14,562	$2,906,609
November 18, 2006	Las Vegas	United States	MGM Grand Garden Arena	15,317 / 15,317	$7,730,162
November 20, 2006	Los Angeles	United States	Staples Center	16,687 / 16,687	$5,707,865

List of 2007 concerts
Date	City	Country	Venue	Attendance	Revenue
June 18, 2007	Zürich	Switzerland	Hallenstadion	—N/a	—N/a
June 21, 2007	Vienna	Austria	Schloss Schönbrunn	—N/a	—N/a
June 26, 2007	Paris	France	Palais Omnisports de Paris-Bercy	—N/a	—N/a
June 30, 2007	Berlin	Germany	Waldbühne Amphitheater	—N/a	—N/a
July 10, 2007	Manchester	England	Manchester Evening News Arena	—N/a	—N/a
July 14, 2007	Celbridge	Ireland	Castletown House	16,753 / 16,753	$4,960,764
July 18, 2007	London	England	The O_{2} Arena	41,045 / 45,000	$20,206,906
July 22, 2007	London	England	The O_{2} Arena	41,045 / 45,000	$20,206,906
July 25, 2007	London	England	The O_{2} Arena	41,045 / 45,000	$20,206,906
TOTAL				367,668 / 373,533 (98.4%)	$117,713,642

== Cancelled shows ==
Date	City	Country	Venue	Reason
June 15, 2007	Rome	Italy	Stadio Flaminio	Fans' complaints about expensive ticket prices
June 24, 2007	Nice	France	Stade Charles-Ehrmann	Unknown
July 4, 2007	Stockholm	Sweden	Stockholm Globe Arena	Vocal rest

== DVD ==
Streisand released a box set called Barbra Streisand: The Concerts which includes the 2006 concert in Florida, the 1994 Live at Arrowhead Pond in Anaheim (on DVD for the first time) and the TV special about The Broadway Album: Putting It Together: The Making of the Broadway Album.

In 2009, this box-set was released in Europe (Region 2) on March 16 and in America (Region 1) on April 28.

== Television special ==
Streisand: Live in Concert, filmed at the featured Florida stop, aired on April 25, 2009, over CBS. The show was watched by 4.98 million viewers.

== See also ==
- List of highest-grossing concert tours by women
