= Barbra Streisand =

American singer and actress (born 1942)

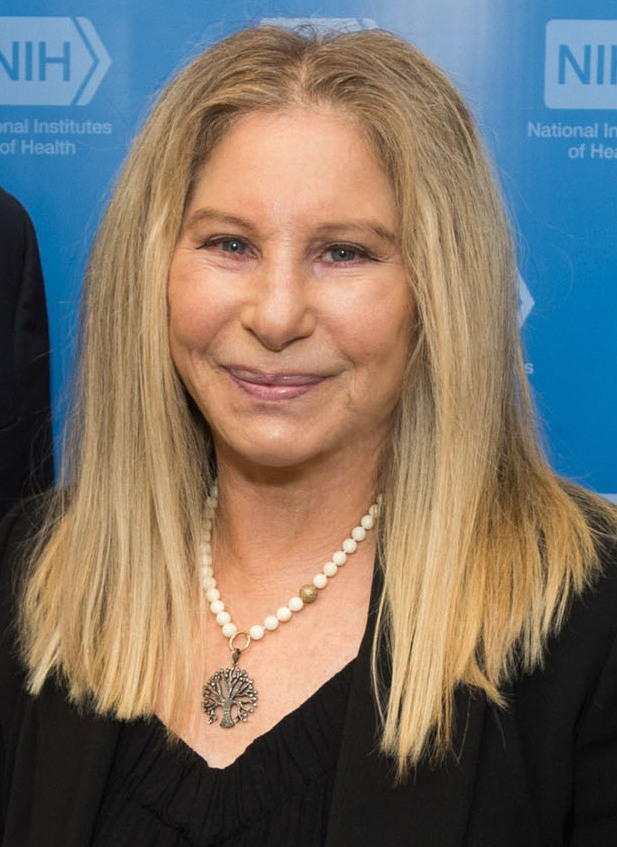
- Streisand in 2018
- Born: Barbara Joan Streisand; April 24, 1942 (age 84); New York City, U.S.
- Occupations: Singer; songwriter; actress; author; filmmaker
- Works: Discography; songs; filmography
- Political party: Democratic
- Spouses: Elliott Gould (m. 1963; div. 1971); James Brolin (m. 1998)
- Partners: Jon Peters (1973–1982); Richard Baskin (1983–1987)
- Children: Jason Gould
- Relatives: Roslyn Kind (half-sister); Adam Streisand (second cousin)
- Awards: Full list
- Musical career
- Genres: Broadway; vocal pop; traditional pop; disco
- Instrument: Vocals
- Years active: 1960–present
- Label: Columbia
- Website: barbrastreisand.com

Barbara Joan "Barbra" Streisand (/ˈstraɪsænd/ STRY-sand; born April 24, 1942) is an American singer, songwriter, actress, author, and filmmaker. Over a career spanning more than six decades, she has achieved success across multiple fields of entertainment, and has earned all four of the major performing art awards—Emmy, Grammy, Oscar, and Tony (EGOT).

Streisand began performing in the early 1960s in nightclubs and Broadway theaters, which led to guest appearances on various television shows. Signing with Columbia Records, Streisand retained full artistic control of her performances in exchange for accepting lower pay—an arrangement that continued throughout her career. Her studio debut The Barbra Streisand Album (1963) won the Grammy Award for Album of the Year. During her recording career, Streisand has amassed a total of 31 RIAA platinum-certified albums, including People (1964), The Way We Were (1974), Guilty (1980), The Broadway Album (1985), and Higher Ground (1997). She was the first woman to score 11 number one albums on the US Billboard 200—from People to Encore: Movie Partners Sing Broadway (2016)—and remains the only artist to top the chart in six decades. Streisand also topped the US Billboard Hot 100 with five singles: "The Way We Were", "Evergreen", "You Don't Bring Me Flowers", "No More Tears (Enough Is Enough)", and "Woman in Love".

In the latter 1960s, after having established success as a vocalist, Streisand ventured into film. She starred in the critically acclaimed Funny Girl (1968), winning the Academy Award for Best Actress. Additional fame on the big screen followed with the extravagant musical Hello, Dolly! (1969), the screwball comedy What's Up, Doc? (1972), and the romantic drama The Way We Were (1973). Streisand won the Academy Award for Best Original Song for writing the love theme from A Star Is Born (1976), the first woman to be honored as a composer. With the release of Yentl (1983), Streisand became the first woman to write, produce, direct, and star in a major studio film. The film won an Oscar for Best Original Score and a Golden Globe for Best Motion Picture Musical. Streisand also received the Golden Globe Award for Best Director, becoming the first (and for 37 years, the only) woman to win that award. Streisand then produced and directed The Prince of Tides (1991), and The Mirror Has Two Faces (1996).

With sales exceeding 150 million records worldwide, Streisand is one of the best-selling recording artists of all time. According to the Recording Industry Association of America (RIAA), she is the third-highest certified female artist in the United States, with 68.5 million certified album units. Billboard ranked Streisand as the greatest solo artist on the Billboard 200 chart, as well as the top Adult Contemporary female artist of all time. Her accolades span ten Grammy Awards, including the Grammy Lifetime Achievement Award and the Grammy Legend Award; nine Golden Globe Awards; five Emmy Awards; four Peabody Awards; two Academy Awards; the Screen Actors Guild Life Achievement Award; the Honorary Palme d'Or; and the Presidential Medal of Freedom.

== Early life ==
=== Family ===
Streisand was born April 24, 1942, in Brooklyn, New York City, to Diana Ida (née Rosen; 1908–2002) and Emanuel Streisand (1908–1943). Her mother had been a soprano in her youth and considered a career in music, but later became a school secretary. Her father was a high school teacher at the same school, where they first met. Streisand's family is Jewish. Her paternal grandparents emigrated from Galicia (modern-day Poland and Ukraine) in the Austro-Hungarian Empire, and her maternal grandparents from the Russian Empire, where her grandfather had been a cantor.

In August 1943, some months after Streisand's first birthday, her father died at age 34 from complications from an epileptic seizure, possibly the result of a head injury years earlier. The family fell into near poverty, with her mother working as a low-paid bookkeeper. As an adult, Streisand remembered those early years as always feeling like an "outcast", explaining, "Everybody else's father came home from work at the end of the day. Mine didn't." Her mother tried to pay their bills but could not give her daughter the attention she craved: "When I wanted love from my mother, she gave me food," Streisand says.

Streisand recalled that her mother had a "great voice" and sang semi-professionally on occasion. In a 2016 interview with Rosie O'Donnell, Streisand recounted that when she was 13, she and her mother recorded some songs on tape during a visit to the Catskills. That session was the first time Streisand ever asserted herself as an artist, which also became her "first moment of inspiration."

She has an older brother, Sheldon, and a younger half-sister, singer Roslyn Kind, from her mother's remarriage to Louis Kind in 1950.

=== Education ===
Streisand began her education at the Jewish Orthodox Yeshiva of Brooklyn when she was five. She was considered bright and inquisitive; however, she lacked discipline, often shouting answers to questions out of turn. She next went to Public School 89 in Brooklyn, and during those early school years began watching television and going to movies. "I always wanted to be somebody, to be famous... You know, get out of Brooklyn."

Streisand became known by others in the neighborhood for her voice. She remembers sitting on the stoop in front of their apartment building with the other kids and singing: "I was considered the girl on the block with the good voice." That talent became a way for her to gain attention. She would often practice her singing in the hallway of her apartment building, which gave her voice an echoing quality.

She made her singing debut at a parent–teacher association assembly, where she became a hit to everyone but her mother, who was mostly critical of her daughter. Streisand was invited to sing at weddings and summer camp, along with having an unsuccessful audition at MGM records when she was nine. By the time she was 13, her mother began supporting her talent, helping her make a four-song demo tape, including "Zing! Went the Strings of My Heart" and "You'll Never Know".

Becoming an actress was her main objective. That desire was made stronger when she saw her first Broadway play, The Diary of Anne Frank, when she was 14. The star in the play was Susan Strasberg, whose acting she wanted to emulate. Streisand began spending her spare time in the library, studying the biographies of various stage actresses such as Eleanora Duse and Sarah Bernhardt. In addition, she began reading novels and plays and studying the acting theories of Konstantin Stanislavski and Michael Chekhov.

In 1956, she attended Erasmus Hall High School in Brooklyn, where she became an honor student in modern history, English, and Spanish. She also joined the Freshman Chorus and Choral Club, where she sang with another choir member and classmate, Neil Diamond. Diamond recalls, "We were two poor kids in Brooklyn. We hung out in the front of Erasmus High and smoked cigarettes." The school was near an art movie house, and he recalls that she was always aware of the films they were showing. She had a crush on 15-year-old US Chess Champion and fellow student Bobby Fischer, whom she found to be "very sexy".

During the summer of 1957, she landed her first stage experience as a walk-on at the Playhouse, in Malden Bridge, New York. That small part was followed by a role as the kid sister in Picnic and as a vamp in Desk Set. In her second year, she took a night job at the Cherry Lane Theatre in Greenwich Village, helping backstage. When she was a senior, she rehearsed for a small part in Driftwood, a play staged in a midtown attic space.

She graduated from Erasmus Hall in January 1959 at age 16, and despite her mother's pleas that she stay out of show business, she set out trying to get roles on the New York City stage. After renting a small apartment on 48th Street in the heart of the theater district, she accepted any job she could involving the stage, and at every opportunity, she "made the rounds" of the casting offices.

== Career ==
=== Beginnings ===
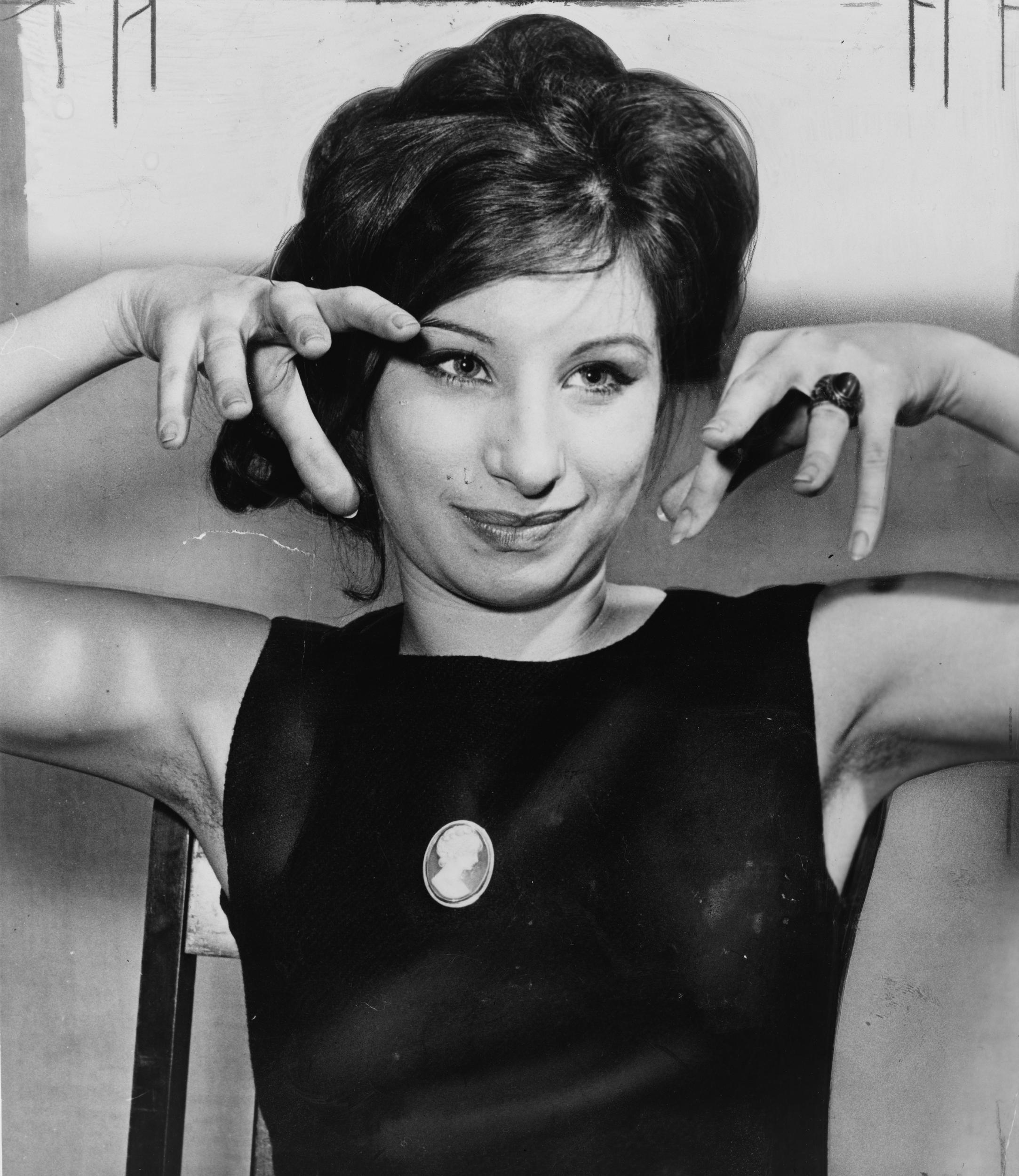
Streisand, c. 1962

Living on her own at 16, Streisand took various menial jobs to have some income. During one period, she lacked a permanent address, and found herself sleeping at the home of friends or anywhere else she could set up the army cot she carried around. When desperate, she returned to her mother's flat in Brooklyn for a home-cooked meal. However, her mother was horrified by her daughter's "gypsy-like lifestyle", wrote biographer Karen Swenson, and again begged her to give up trying to get into show business, but Streisand took her mother's pleadings as even more reason to keep trying: "My desires were strengthened by wanting to prove to my mother that I could be a star."

Streisand took a job as an usher at the Lunt-Fontanne Theater for The Sound of Music early in 1960. During the run of the play, she heard that the casting director was auditioning for more singers, and it marked the first time she sang in pursuit of a job. Although the director felt she was not right for the part, he encouraged her to begin including her talent as a singer on her résumé when looking for other work.

Streisand asked her boyfriend, Barry Dennen, to tape her singing, copies of which she could then give out to possible employers. Dennen found a guitarist to accompany her.

We spent the afternoon taping, and the moment I heard the first playback I went insane ... This nutty little kook had one of the most breathtaking voices I'd ever heard ... when she was finished and I turned off the machine, I needed a long moment before I dared look up at her.

Dennen grew enthusiastic and he convinced her to enter a talent contest at the Lion, a gay nightclub in Manhattan's Greenwich Village. She performed two songs, after which there was a "stunned silence" from the audience, followed by "thunderous applause" when she was pronounced the winner. She was invited back and sang at the club for several weeks. During this time, disliking her name, she changed it from "Barbara" to "Barbra". In the early days of her career, Streisand was repeatedly told she was too ugly to be a star and was advised to get a nose job, which she declined to do.

==== Nightclub shows ====
Streisand was next asked to audition at the Bon Soir nightclub, after which she was signed up at $125 a week. It became her first professional engagement in September 1960, where she was the opening act for comedian Phyllis Diller. She recalls it was the first time she had been in that kind of upscale environment: "I'd never been in a nightclub until I sang in one."

Dennen now wanted to expose Streisand to his vast record collection of female singers, including Billie Holiday, Mabel Mercer, Ethel Waters, and Édith Piaf. Streisand realized she could still become an actress by first gaining recognition as a singer. From his collection she drew the song that best defined her mission in singing: A Sleepin' Bee, with music by Harold Arlen and lyrics by Truman Capote for the 1954 musical House of Flowers. "The lyrics to that song gave me the three acts of a play that I longed for as an actress," Streisand said. "And Harold was one of those writers who could write these magnificent melodies. That gave me what I needed." According to biographer Christopher Nickens, hearing other great female singers benefited her style, as she began creating different emotional characters when performing, which gave her singing a greater range.

Streisand improved her stage presence when speaking to the audience between songs. She discovered that her Brooklyn-bred style of humor was received favorably. During the next six months appearing at the club, some began comparing her singing voice to famous names such as Judy Garland, Lena Horne and Fanny Brice. Her conversational ability to charm an audience with spontaneous humor during performances became more sophisticated and professional. Theater critic Leonard Harris wrote: "She's twenty; by the time she's thirty she will have rewritten the record books."

Her name is Barbra Streisand. She is 20 years old, she has a three-octave promiscuity of range, she packs more personal dynamic power than anybody I can recall since Libby Holman or Helen Morgan. She can sing as loud as Ethel Merman and as persuasively as Lena or Ella, or as brassy as a Sophie Tucker ... and only Barbra Streisand can turn "Cry Me a River" into something comparable to Enrico Caruso having his first bash at Pagliacci. When Streisand cries you a river, you got a river, Sam ... and she will be around 50 years from now if good songs are still written to be sung by good singers.

— Syndicated columnist Robert Ruark,
on her 1963 performances at the Blue Angel.

==== Early theatre roles and Broadway debut ====
Streisand accepted her first role on the New York stage in Another Evening with Harry Stoones, a satirical comedy play in which she acted and sang two solos. The show received terrible reviews and closed the next day. With the help of her new personal manager, Martin Erlichman, she had successful shows in Detroit and St. Louis. Erlichman then booked her at an even more upscale nightclub in Manhattan, the Blue Angel, where she became a bigger hit during the period from 1961 to 1962. Streisand once told Jimmy Fallon, with whom she sang a duet on the Tonight Show, that Erlichman was a "fantastic manager" and still managed her career after 50 years.

While appearing at the Blue Angel, theater director and playwright Arthur Laurents asked her to audition for a new musical comedy he was directing, I Can Get It for You Wholesale. She got the part of secretary to the lead actor businessman, played by then-unknown Elliott Gould. They fell in love during rehearsals and eventually moved into a small apartment together. The show opened on March 22, 1962, at the Shubert Theater, and received rave reviews. Her performance "stopped the show cold", wrote Nickens. Groucho Marx, while hosting the Tonight Show, told her that 20 was an "extremely young age to be a success on Broadway". Streisand received a Tony Award nomination and New York Drama Critic's prize for Best Supporting Actress. The show was recorded and made into an album.

==== Early television appearances ====
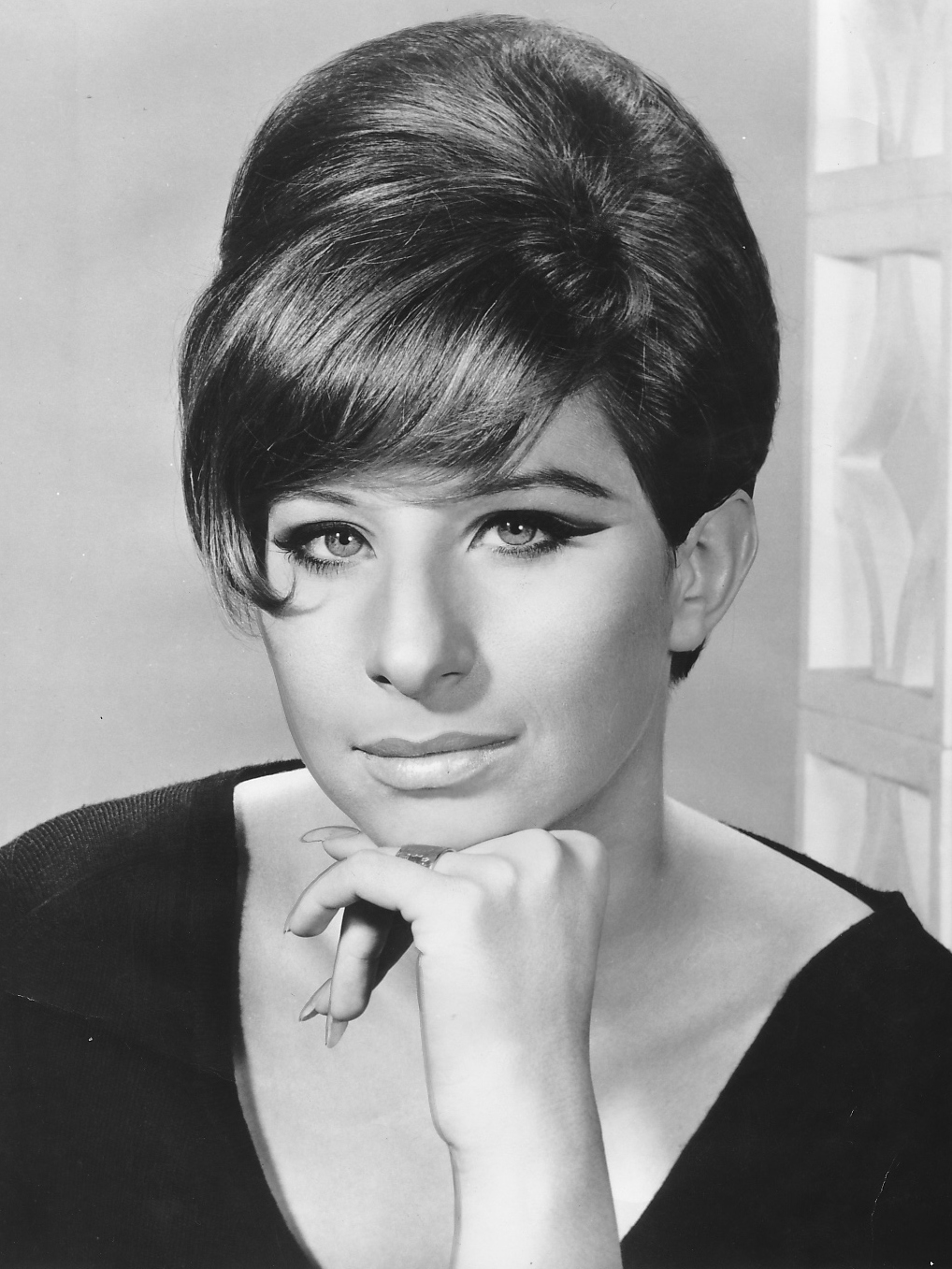
Streisand in 1966

Streisand's first television appearance was on The Tonight Show, then credited to its regular host, Jack Paar. She was seen during an April 1961 episode on which Orson Bean substituted for Paar. She sang Harold Arlen's "A Sleepin' Bee". During her appearance, Phyllis Diller, also a guest on the show, called her "one of the great singing talents in the world."

Later in 1961, before she was cast in Another Evening With Harry Stoones, Streisand became a semi-regular on PM East/PM West, a talk/variety series hosted by Mike Wallace and Joyce Davidson. Some of Streisand's PM East segments survive as audio recordings, and still photos survive, but moving images do not.

In early 1962, she went into the Columbia Records studio for the cast recording of I Can Get It for You Wholesale. Also that spring, she participated in a 25th anniversary studio recording of Pins and Needles, the classic popular front musical originated in 1937 by the International Ladies' Garment Workers' Union. Reviews of both albums highlighted Streisand's performances.

In May 1962, Streisand appeared on The Garry Moore Show, where she sang "Happy Days Are Here Again" for the first time. Her sad, slow version of the 1930s upbeat Democratic Party theme song became her signature song during this early phase of her career.

Johnny Carson had her on the Tonight Show half a dozen times in 1962 and 1963, and she became a favorite of his television audience and himself personally. He described her as an "exciting new singer". During one show, she joked with Groucho Marx, who liked her style of humor.

She did three or four songs, and she was beyond brilliant – so amazing.

— Elliott Gould, about their first play together in 1961

In December 1962, Streisand made the first of a number of appearances on The Ed Sullivan Show. She was later a cohost on The Mike Douglas Show, and also made an impact on a number of Bob Hope specials. Performing with her on The Ed Sullivan Show was Liberace, who became an instant fan of the young singer. Liberace invited her to Las Vegas to perform as his opening act at the Riviera Hotel. He is credited with introducing Streisand to audiences on the West Coast. The following September, during her ongoing shows at Harrah's Hotel in Lake Tahoe, she and Elliott Gould took time off to get married in Carson City, Nevada. With her career and popularity rising so quickly, she saw her marriage to Gould as a "stabilizing influence".

==== First albums ====
At age 21, Streisand signed a contract with Columbia Records that gave her full creative control, in exchange for less money. Lieberson relented and agreed to sign her. Nearly three decades later, she said:

The most important thing about that first contract – actually, the thing we held out for – was a unique clause giving me the right to choose my own material. It was the only thing I really cared about. I still received lots of pressure from the label to include some pop hits on my first album, but I held out for the songs that really meant something to me.

Streisand took advantage of this several times during her career. Columbia wanted to call her first album, in early 1963, Sweet and Saucy Streisand. She used her control to insist that it was called The Barbra Streisand Album, saying "if you saw me on TV, you could just go [to the record shop] and ask for the Barbra Streisand album." It reached the top 10 on the Billboard chart and won three Grammy Awards. The album made her the best-selling female vocalist in the country. The Second Barbra Streisand Album followed later that year, which established her as the "most exciting new personality since Elvis Presley." She ended that breakthrough year of 1963 by performing one-night concerts in Indianapolis, San Jose, Chicago, Sacramento, and Los Angeles.

==== Return to the stage ====
Streisand returned to Broadway in 1964 with an acclaimed performance as entertainer Fanny Brice in Funny Girl at the Winter Garden Theatre. The show introduced two of her signature songs, "People" and "Don't Rain on My Parade". Because of the musical's overnight success, she appeared on the cover of Time. In 1964, Streisand was nominated for a Tony Award for Best Leading Actress in a Musical but lost to Carol Channing in Hello, Dolly! Streisand received an honorary "Star of the Decade" Tony Award in 1970.

In 1966, Streisand repeated her success with Funny Girl in London's West End at the Prince of Wales Theatre. From 1965 to 1968 she appeared in her first four solo television specials, including the Emmy Award–winning My Name is Barbra.

Streisand applied for an apartment in two buildings in Manhattan but was rejected by the co-op boards of both buildings. She bought a townhouse on Manhattan's Upper East Side in 1970, which was sold after ten years.

=== Stardom ===
==== Singing ====
Streisand has recorded 50 studio albums, almost all with Columbia Records. Her early works in the 1960s (her debut The Barbra Streisand Album, The Second Barbra Streisand Album, The Third Album, My Name Is Barbra, etc.) are considered classic renditions of theatre and cabaret standards, including her pensive version of the normally uptempo "Happy Days Are Here Again". She performed this in a duet with Judy Garland on The Judy Garland Show. Garland referred to her on the air as one of the last great belters. They also sang "There's No Business Like Show Business", with Ethel Merman joining them.

On The Ed Sullivan Show in 1969

Beginning with My Name Is Barbra, her early albums were often medley-filled keepsakes of her television specials. Starting in 1969, she began attempting more contemporary material, but like many talented singers of the day, she found herself out of her element with rock. Her vocal talents prevailed, and she gained newfound success with the pop and ballad-oriented Richard Perry-produced album Stoney End in 1971. The title track, written by Laura Nyro, was a major hit for Streisand.

During the 1970s, she was also highly prominent on the pop charts, with Top 10 recordings such as "The Way We Were" (US No. 1); "Evergreen (Love Theme from A Star Is Born)" (US No. 1); "No More Tears (Enough Is Enough)" (1979, with Donna Summer), which as of 2010 is reportedly still the most commercially successful duet, (US No. 1); "You Don't Bring Me Flowers" (with Neil Diamond) (US No. 1); and "The Main Event" (US No. 3), some of which came from soundtrack recordings of her films. As the 1970s ended, Streisand was named the most successful female singer in the U.S. — only Elvis Presley and The Beatles had sold more albums. In 1980, she released her best-selling effort to date, the Barry Gibb-produced Guilty. The album contained the hits "Woman in Love" (which spent several weeks on top of the pop charts in the fall of 1980), "Guilty", and "What Kind of Fool".

After years of largely ignoring Broadway and traditional pop music in favor of more contemporary material, Streisand returned to her musical-theater roots. Columbia Records objected that the songs she wanted to sing were not pop songs, but Streisand asserted the full creative control her contract gave her—'I've always had the right to sing what I want'—with 1985's The Broadway Album, which was unexpectedly successful, holding the coveted No. 1 Billboard position for three straight weeks and being certified quadruple platinum. The album featured tunes by Rodgers and Hammerstein, George Gershwin, Jerome Kern, and Stephen Sondheim, who was persuaded to rework some of his songs especially for this recording. The Broadway Album was met with acclaim, including a Grammy nomination for album of the year, and handed Streisand her eighth Grammy as Best Female Vocalist. After releasing the live album One Voice in 1986, Streisand was set to release another album of Broadway songs in 1988. She recorded several cuts for the album under the direction of Rupert Holmes, including "On My Own" (from Les Misérables), a medley of "How Are Things in Glocca Morra?", and "Heather on the Hill" (from Finian's Rainbow and Brigadoon, respectively), "All I Ask of You" (from The Phantom of the Opera), "Warm All Over" (from The Most Happy Fella), and an unusual solo version of "Make Our Garden Grow" (from Candide). Streisand was not happy with the direction of the project and it was scrapped. Only "Warm All Over" and a reworked, lite FM-friendly version of "All I Ask of You" were ever released, the latter appearing on Streisand's 1988 effort, Till I Loved You. At the beginning of the 1990s, Streisand started focusing on her film directorial efforts and became almost inactive in the recording studio. In 1991, a four-disc box set, Just for the Record, was released. A compilation spanning Streisand's entire career to date, it featured over 70 tracks of live performances, greatest hits, rarities, and previously unreleased material.

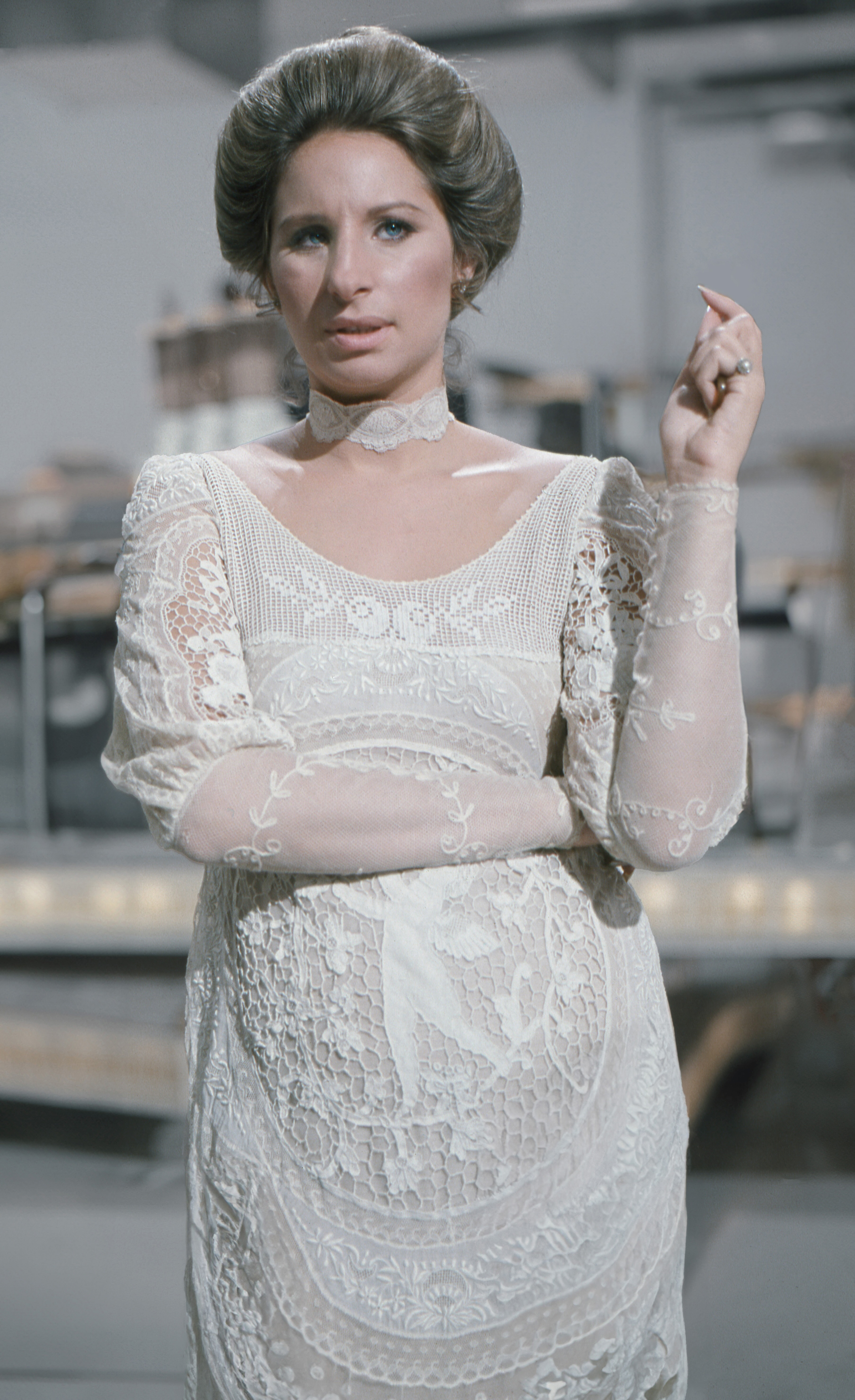
Streisand taping her TV Special Barbra Streisand ... and other Musical Instruments in 1973

The following year, Streisand's concert fundraising events helped propel President Bill Clinton into the spotlight and into office. Streisand later introduced Clinton at his inauguration in 1993. Streisand's music career, however, was largely on hold. A 1992 appearance at an APLA benefit, as well as the aforementioned inaugural performance, hinted that Streisand was becoming more receptive to the idea of live performances. A tour was suggested, though Streisand would not immediately commit to it, citing her well-known stage fright as well as security concerns. During this time, Streisand finally returned to the recording studio and released Back to Broadway in June 1993. While Back to Broadway received less critical acclaim than its predecessor, it debuted at No. 1 on the Billboard 200, a notable achievement for a mature artist that simultaneously displaced Janet Jackson's Janet from the top position. One of the album's highlights was a medley of "I Have A Love" / "One Hand, One Heart", a duet with Johnny Mathis, who Streisand said is one of her favorite singers.

In 1993, The New York Times music critic Stephen Holden wrote that Streisand "enjoys a cultural status that only one other American entertainer, Frank Sinatra, has achieved in the last half century". In September 1993, Streisand announced her first public concert appearances in 27 years (discounting her Las Vegas nightclub performances between 1969 and 1972). What began as a two-night New Year's event at the MGM Grand Las Vegas led to a multi-city tour in the summer of 1994. Tickets for the tour sold out in under an hour. Streisand also appeared on the covers of major magazines in anticipation of what Time magazine named "The Music Event of the Century". The tour was one of the biggest all-media merchandise parlays in history. Ticket prices ranged from US$50 to US$1,500, making Streisand the highest-paid concert performer in history at the time. Barbra Streisand: The Concert went on to be the top-grossing concert of the year and earned five Emmy Awards and the Peabody Award, while the taped broadcast on HBO was the highest-rated concert special in HBO's 30-year history. Following the tour's conclusion, Streisand once again kept a low profile musically, instead focusing her efforts on acting and directing duties as well as a burgeoning romance with actor James Brolin.

In 1996, Streisand released "I Finally Found Someone" as a duet with Canadian singer and songwriter Bryan Adams. The song was nominated for an Oscar, as it was part of the soundtrack of Streisand's self-directed movie The Mirror Has Two Faces. It reached No. 8 on the Billboard Hot 100 and was her first significant hit in almost a decade and her first Top 10 hit on the Hot 100 (and first gold single) since 1981.

In 1997, she finally returned to the recording studio, releasing Higher Ground, a collection of songs of a loosely inspirational nature that also featured a duet with Céline Dion. The album received generally favorable reviews and once again debuted at No. 1 on the pop charts. Following her marriage to Brolin in 1998, Streisand recorded A Love Like Ours the following year. Reviews were mixed, with many critics complaining about the somewhat syrupy sentiments and overly lush arrangements; however, it did produce a modest hit for Streisand in the country-tinged "If You Ever Leave Me", a duet with Vince Gill.

On New Year's Eve 1999, Streisand returned to the concert stage, selling out in the first few hours, eight months before her return. At the end of the millennium, she was the number one female singer in the U.S., with at least two No. 1 albums in each decade since she began performing. A two-disc live album, Timeless: Live in Concert, was released in 2000. Streisand performed versions of the Timeless concert in Sydney and Melbourne, Australia, in early 2000. In advance of four concerts (two each in Los Angeles and New York) in September 2000, Streisand announced that she was retiring from playing public concerts. Her performance of the song "People" was broadcast on the Internet via America Online.

Streisand's subsequent albums included Christmas Memories (2001), a somewhat somber collection of holiday songs, and The Movie Album (2003), featuring famous film themes and backed by a large symphony orchestra. Guilty Pleasures (called Guilty Too in the UK), a collaboration with Barry Gibb and a sequel to their Guilty, was released worldwide in 2005.

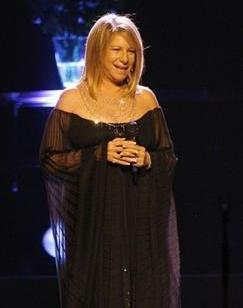
Streisand performing in July 2007 at The O2 Arena in London

In February 2006, Streisand recorded the song "Smile" alongside Tony Bennett at Streisand's Malibu home. The song is included on Bennett's 80th birthday album, Duets. In September 2006, the pair filmed a live performance of the song for Tony Bennett: An American Classic, directed by Rob Marshall. The special aired on NBC on November 21, 2006, and was released on DVD the same day. Streisand's duet with Bennett opened the special.

That same year, Streisand announced her intent to tour again, in an effort to raise money and awareness for multiple issues. After four days of rehearsal at the Sovereign Bank Arena in Trenton, New Jersey, the 2006 Streisand concert tour began on October 4 at the Wachovia Center in Philadelphia, continued with a featured stop in Sunrise, Florida, and concluded at Staples Center in Los Angeles on November 20, 2006. Special guests Il Divo were interwoven throughout the show. Streisand's 20-concert tour set box office records. At the age of 64, she grossed $92,457,062 and set house gross records in 14 of the 16 arenas played on the tour. She set the third-place record for her show of October 9, 2006, at Madison Square Garden, the first- and second-place records of which are held by her two shows in September 2000. She set the second-place record at MGM Grand Garden Arena, with her December 31, 1999, show being the house record and highest-grossing concert of all time. This led many people to openly criticize Streisand for price gouging, as many tickets sold for upwards of $1,000.

A collection of performances culled from different stops on this tour, Live in Concert 2006, debuted at No. 7 on the Billboard 200, making it Streisand's 29th Top 10 album. In the summer of 2007, Streisand gave concerts for the first time in continental Europe. The first concert took place in Zürich (June 18), then Vienna (June 22), Paris (June 26), Berlin (June 30), Stockholm (July 4, canceled), Manchester (July 10), and Celbridge, near Dublin (July 14), followed by three concerts in London (July 18, 22 and 25), the only European city where Streisand had performed before 2007. Tickets for the London dates cost between £100.00 and £1,500.00, and for Ireland, between €118 and €500. The Ireland date was marred by issues with serious parking and seating problems, leading to the event's being dubbed a fiasco by Hot Press. The tour included a 58-piece orchestra.

In February 2008, Forbes listed Streisand as the No. 2-earning female musician between June 2006 and June 2007, with earnings of about $60 million. On November 17, 2008, Streisand returned to the studio to begin recording what would be her 63rd album and it was announced that Diana Krall was producing the album. Streisand is one of the recipients of the 2008 Kennedy Center Honors. On December 7, 2008, she visited the White House as part of the ceremonies.

On April 25, 2009, CBS aired Streisand's latest television special, Streisand: Live in Concert, highlighting the featured stop from her 2006 North American tour in Fort Lauderdale, Florida. On September 26, 2009, Streisand performed a one-night-only show at the Village Vanguard in New York City's Greenwich Village. This performance was later released on DVD as One Night Only: Barbra Streisand and Quartet at The Village Vanguard. On September 29, 2009, Streisand and Columbia Records released the studio album Love is the Answer, produced by Diana Krall. On October 2, 2009, Streisand made her British television performance debut with an interview on Friday Night with Jonathan Ross to promote the album. This album debuted at No. 1 on the Billboard 200 and registered her biggest weekly sales since 1997, making Streisand the only artist in history to achieve No. 1 albums in five different decades.

On February 1, 2010, Streisand joined over 80 other artists in recording a new version of the 1985 charity single "We Are the World". Quincy Jones and Lionel Richie planned to release the new version to mark the 25th anniversary of its original recording. These plans changed, however, in view of the devastating earthquake that hit Haiti on January 12, 2010, and on February 12, the song, now called "We Are the World 25 for Haiti", made its debut as a charity single to support relief aid for the island nation.

Streisand was honored as MusiCares Person of the Year on February 11, 2011, two days prior to the 53rd Annual Grammy Awards. That same year, Streisand sang "Somewhere" from the Broadway musical West Side Story with child prodigy Jackie Evancho on Evancho's album Dream with Me.

On October 11, 2012, Streisand gave a three-hour concert performance before a crowd of 18,000 as part of the ongoing inaugural events of Barclays Center (and part of her current Barbra Live tour) in Brooklyn (her first-ever public performance in her home borough). Streisand was joined onstage by trumpeter Chris Botti, Italian operatic trio Il Volo, and her son, Jason Gould. The concert included musical tributes by Streisand to Donna Summer and Marvin Hamlisch, both of whom had died earlier in 2012. Confirmed attendees included Barbara Walters, Jimmy Fallon, Sting, Katie Couric, Woody Allen, Michael Douglas, and New York City mayor Michael Bloomberg, as well as designers Calvin Klein, Donna Karan, Ralph Lauren, and Michael Kors. In June 2013, she gave two concerts in Bloomfield Stadium, Tel Aviv.

Streisand is one of many singers who use teleprompters during their live performances. Streisand has defended her choice in using teleprompters to display lyrics and, sometimes, banter.

In September 2014, she released Partners, a new album of duets that features a song with Elvis Presley as well as collaborations with Andrea Bocelli, Stevie Wonder, Lionel Richie, Billy Joel, Babyface, Michael Bublé, Josh Groban, John Mayer, John Legend, Blake Shelton, and Jason Gould. This album topped the Billboard 200, with sales of 196,000 copies in the first week, making Streisand the only recording artist to have a No. 1 album in each of the past six decades. It was also certified gold in November 2014 and platinum in January 2015, thus becoming Streisand's 52nd gold and 31st Platinum album, more than any other female artist in history.

In May 2016, Streisand announced the upcoming album Encore: Movie Partners Sing Broadway, to be released in August following a nine-city concert tour, Barbra: The Music, The Mem'ries, The Magic, including performances in Los Angeles, Las Vegas, Philadelphia, and a return to her hometown of Brooklyn. In June 2018, Streisand confirmed she was working on the new studio album Walls, released November 2, 2018, just prior to the U.S. midterm election. The album's lead single, "Don't Lie to Me", was written as a criticism of America's political climate amid the presidency of Donald Trump, while the title track alludes to Trump's frequent calls for a wall at the Mexico border.

Streisand released the single "Love Will Survive", from the television series The Tattooist of Auschwitz, on April 25, 2024.

==== Acting ====
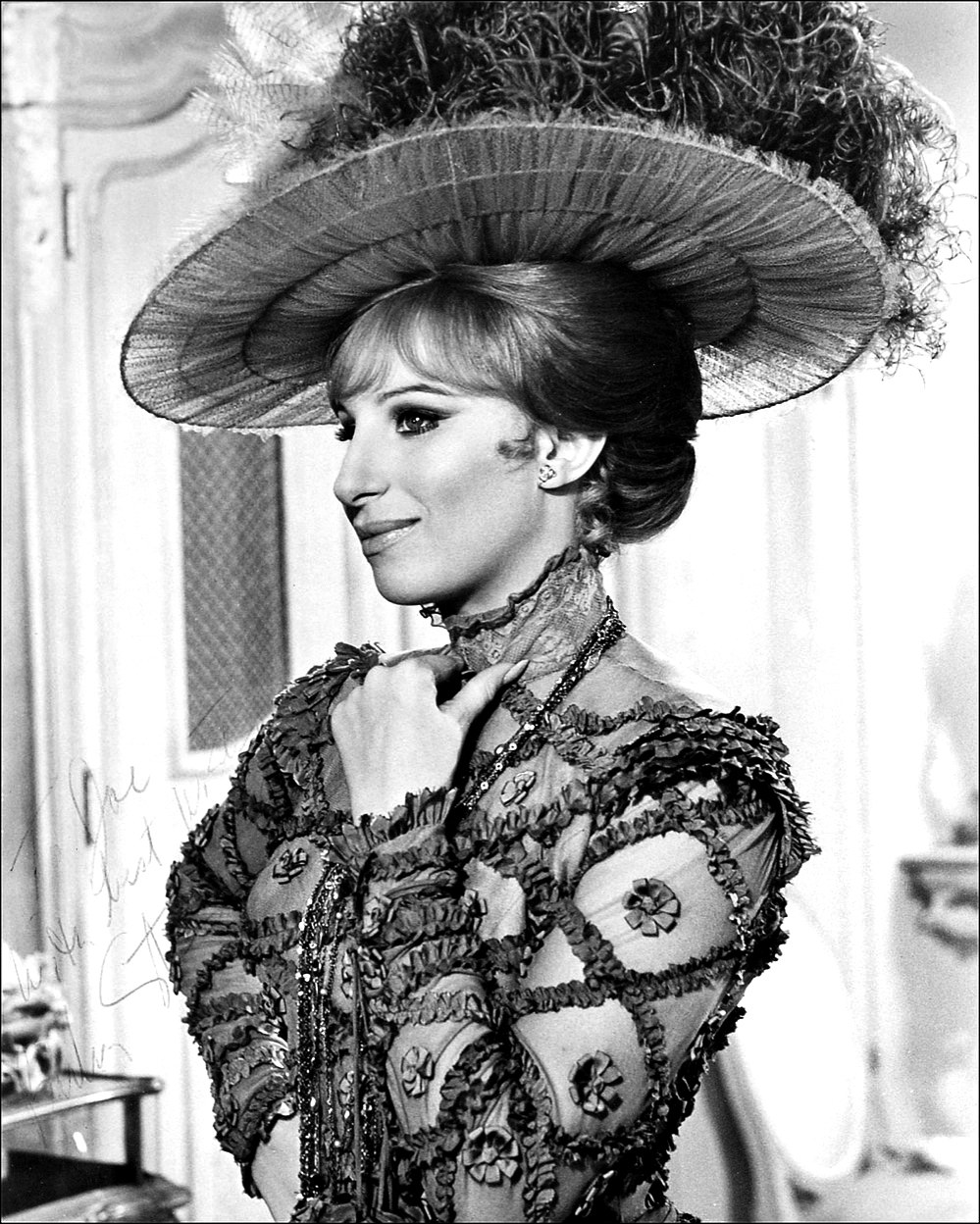
Streisand in Hello, Dolly! (1969)

Streisand's first film was a reprise of her Broadway hit Funny Girl (1968), an artistic and commercial success directed by Hollywood veteran William Wyler. She won the 1968 Academy Award for Best Actress for the role, sharing it with Katharine Hepburn (The Lion in Winter), the only time there has been a tie in this Oscar category. Her next two movies were also based on musicals—Jerry Herman's Hello, Dolly!, directed by Gene Kelly (1969); and Alan Jay Lerner's and Burton Lane's On a Clear Day You Can See Forever, directed by Vincente Minnelli (1970)—while her fourth film was based on the Broadway play The Owl and the Pussycat (1970).

During the 1970s, Streisand starred in several screwball comedies, including What's Up, Doc? (1972) and The Main Event (1979), both co-starring Ryan O'Neal, and For Pete's Sake (1974) with Michael Sarrazin. One of her most famous roles during this period was in the drama The Way We Were (1973) with Robert Redford, for which she received an Academy Award nomination as Best Actress. She earned her second Academy Award for Best Original Song (with lyricist Paul Williams) for the song "Evergreen", from A Star Is Born in 1976, in which she also starred.

Along with Paul Newman, Sidney Poitier, and later Steve McQueen, Streisand formed First Artists Production Company in 1969 so that actors could secure properties and develop movie projects for themselves. Streisand's initial outing with First Artists was Up the Sandbox (1972).

From 1969 to 1980, Streisand appeared in Top Ten Money Making Stars Poll, the annual motion picture exhibitors poll of Top 10 Box Office attractions a total of 10 times, often as the only woman on the list. After the commercially disappointing All Night Long in 1981, Streisand's film output decreased considerably, appearing in only eight films since.

I'm impressed with her choosing Yentl; it was extraordinary. But for some reason, Hollywood turned against her ... there was a lack of sympathy toward her ... Christ, she could have played Cleopatra better than Liz Taylor, with her enormous power and the subtlety of her singing ... She is one of the great actresses and she hasn't been well used.

— Director John Huston, Playboy interview, 1985

Streisand produced a number of her own films, setting up Barwood Films in 1972. Yentl (1983) was turned down by every Hollywood studio at least once when she proposed both directing and starring in the film, until Orion Pictures took on the project and gave the film a budget of $14 million. For Yentl (1983), she was producer, director, and star, an experience she repeated for The Prince of Tides (1991) and The Mirror Has Two Faces (1996). There was controversy when Yentl received five Academy Award nominations but none for the major categories of Best Picture, Actress, or Director. The Prince of Tides received even more Oscar nominations, including Best Picture and Best Screenplay, although not for director. Upon completion of the film, its screenwriter, Pat Conroy, who also authored the novel, called Streisand "a goddess who walks upon the earth."

Streisand also co-scripted Yentl (with Jack Rosenthal), something for which she is not always given credit. According to The New York Times editor Andrew Rosenthal, in an interview with Allan Wolper, "The one thing that makes Barbra Streisand crazy is when nobody gives her the credit for having written Yentl."

After an eight-year hiatus of screen roles, Streisand returned to film acting for the comedy Meet the Fockers (2004, a sequel to Meet the Parents), playing opposite Dustin Hoffman, Ben Stiller, Blythe Danner, and Robert De Niro.

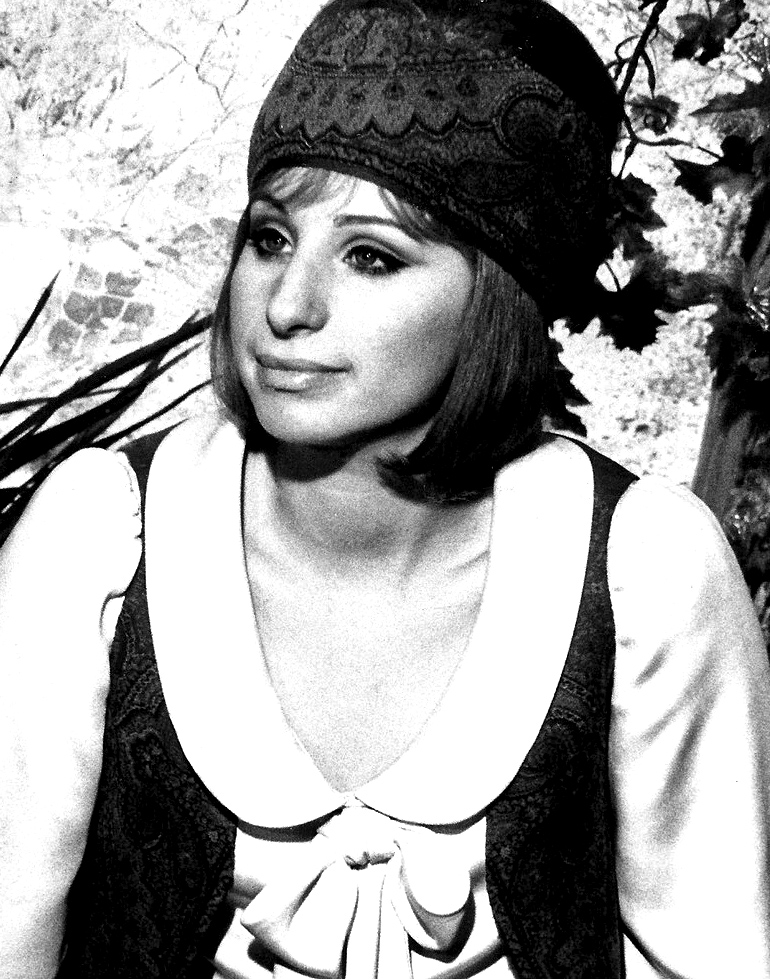
Streisand in On a Clear Day You Can See Forever (1970)

In 2005, Streisand's Barwood Films, Gary Smith, and Sonny Murray purchased the rights to Simon Mawer's book Mendel's Dwarf. In December 2008, she stated that she was considering directing an adaptation of Larry Kramer's play The Normal Heart, a project she has worked on since the mid-1990s.

Streisand reprised the role of Roz Focker in Little Fockers (2010, alongside Dustin Hoffman), the third film from the Meet the Parents trilogy.

Paramount Pictures gave the green light to begin shooting the road trip comedy My Mother's Curse in early 2011, with Seth Rogen playing Streisand's character's son. Anne Fletcher directed the project, with a script by Dan Fogelman, produced by Lorne Michaels, John Goldwyn, and Evan Goldberg. Executive producers included Streisand, Rogen, Fogelman, and David Ellison, whose Skydance Productions co-financed the road movie. Shooting began in spring 2011 and wrapped in July; the film's title was eventually altered to The Guilt Trip, and the movie was released in December 2012.

Plans emerged in 2015 for Streisand to direct a feature biopic about the 18th-century Russian empress Catherine the Great, based on the top 2014 Black List script produced by Gil Netter, with Keira Knightley starring. Streisand was also set to star in a film adaptation of the musical Gypsy – featuring music by Jules Styne, book by Arthur Laurents, and lyrics by Stephen Sondheim – with Richard LaGravenese attached to the project as screenwriter. Streisand was in advanced negotiations to star and produce the film in April 2016, to be directed by Barry Levinson and distributed by STX Entertainment. Two months later, the film's script had been completed and production was scheduled to begin in early 2017. Streisand reportedly exited the project, and both failed to move into production.

== Artistry ==
Streisand possesses a mezzo-soprano vocal range, which Howard Cohen of the Miami Herald described as "peerless". Whitney Balliett wrote, "Streisand wows her listeners with her shrewd dynamics (in-your-ear soft here, elbowing-loud there), her bravura climbs, her rolling vibrato, and the singular Streisand-from-Brooklyn nasal quality of her voice – a voice as immediately recognizable in its way as Louis Armstrong's." Music writer Allegra Rossi adds that Streisand creates complete compositions in her head:

Even though she can't read or write music, Barbra hears melodies as completed compositions in her head. She hears a melody and takes it in, learning it quickly. Barbra developed her ability to sustain long notes because she wanted to. She can mold a tune that others cannot; she's able to sing between song and speech, keeping in tune, carrying rhythm and meaning.

While she is predominantly a pop singer, Streisand's voice has been described as "semi-operatic" due to its strength and quality of tone. According to Adam Feldman of Time Out, Streisand's "signature vocal style" is "a suspension bridge between old-school belting and microphone pop." She is known for her ability to hold relatively high notes, both loud and soft, with great intensity—which led classical pianist Glenn Gould to call himself "a Streisand freak"—as well as for her ability to make slight but unobtrusive embellishments on a melodic line.

Since about 2010 critics and audiences noted that her voice had "lowered and acquired an occasionally husky edge". However, New York Times music critic Stephen Holden noted that her distinctive tone and musical instincts remained, and that she still had "the gift of conveying a primal human longing in a beautiful sound". Paul Taylor of The Independent wrote that Streisand "has sounded a little scratchy and frayed, though the stout resolve and superb technique with which Streisand manages to hoist it over these difficulties has come to seem morally as well aesthetically impressive." Reviewing Streisand's 2014 studio album Partners, Gil Naveh of Haaretz described Streisand's voice as "velvety, clear and powerful ... and the passing years have given it a fascinating depth and roughness."

== Personal life ==
=== Marriages and relationships ===
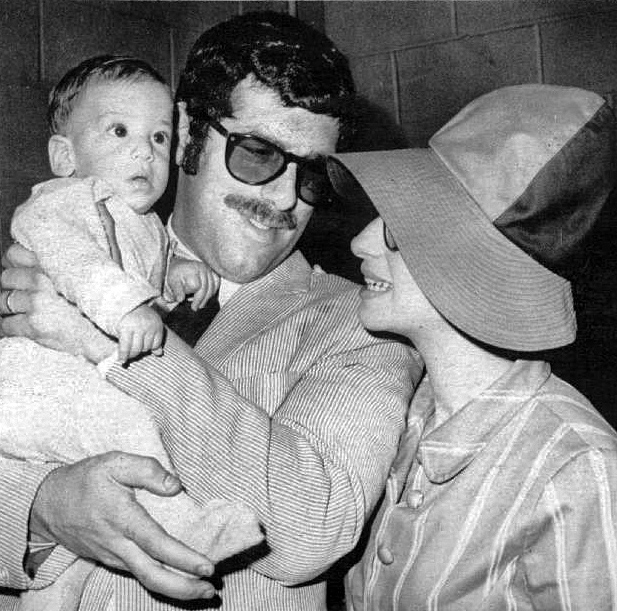
Streisand with her first husband Elliott Gould and son Jason (1967)

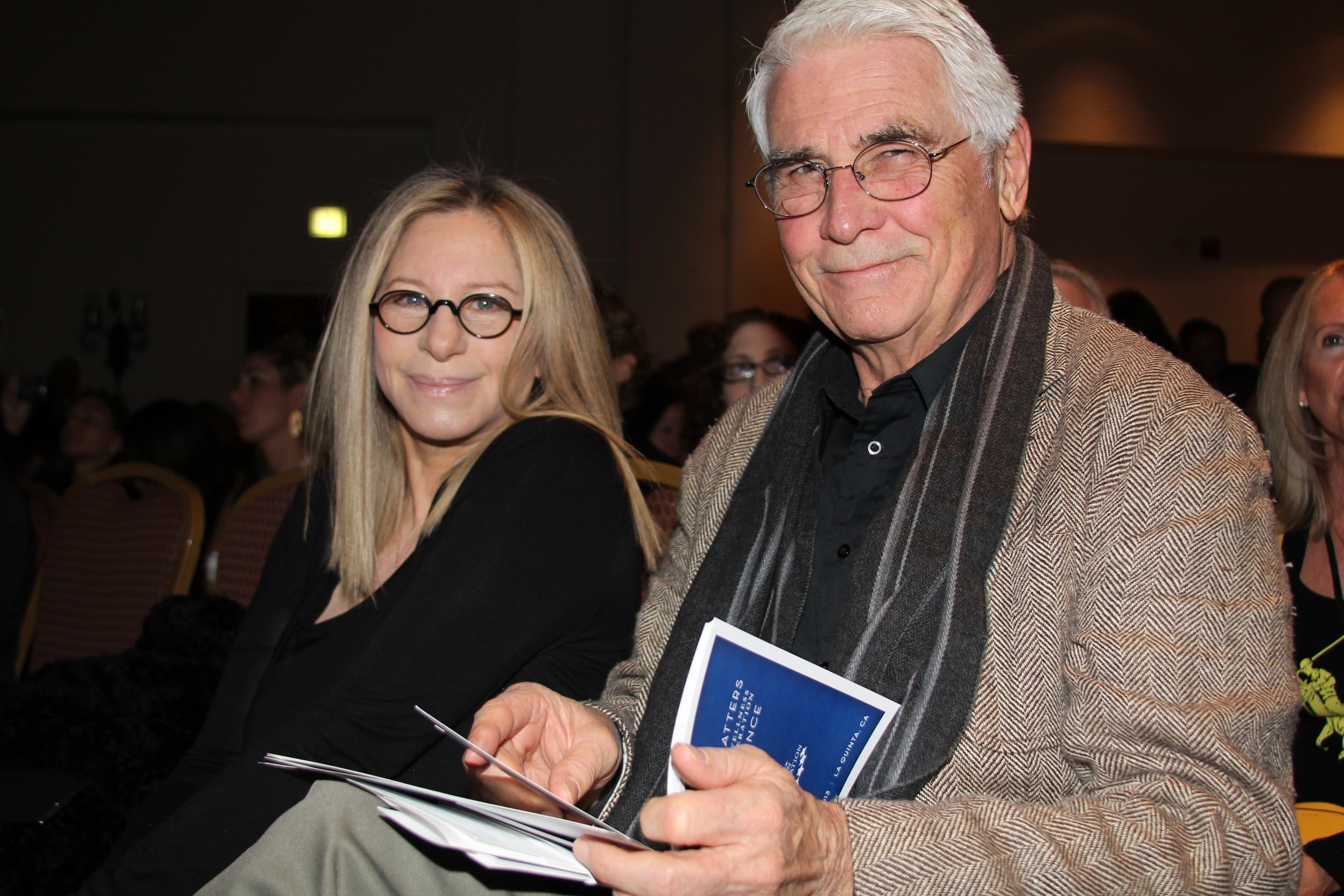
With second husband James Brolin (2013)

Streisand has been married twice. Her first husband was actor Elliott Gould, whom she married on September 13, 1963. They announced their separation on February 12, 1969, and divorced on July 6, 1971. They had one child, Jason Gould, who appeared as her on-screen son in The Prince of Tides.

In 1969 and 1970, Streisand dated Canadian Prime Minister Pierre Trudeau.

She started a relationship with hairdresser/producer Jon Peters in 1973. He went on to be her manager and producer. They broke up in 1982 during the making of Yentl but remain friends. She is the godmother of his daughters, Caleigh Peters and Skye Peters.

Streisand briefly dated film director Michael Cimino in early 1983, though they kept their relationship secret. Cimino had considered her for a role in his planned adaptation of The Fountainhead by Ayn Rand, which was not made.

From November 1983 to October 1987, Streisand lived with Baskin-Robbins ice cream heir Richard Baskin, who composed the lyrics to "Here We Are At Last" on her 1984 album Emotion. They remained friends after the split, and Baskin would accompany Streisand to public events in between her subsequent romances.

She dated actor Don Johnson from December 1987 until at least September 1988; they recorded a duet of "Till I Loved You".

Streisand briefly dated actors Richard Gere in 1983 and Clint Eastwood in 1989.

From 1989 to 1991, she was involved with composer James Newton Howard.

Streisand dated tennis champion Andre Agassi from 1992 to 1993. Writing about the relationship in his 2009 autobiography, Agassi said: "We agree that we're good for each other, and so what if she's twenty-eight years older? We're simpatico, and the public outcry only adds spice to our connection. It makes our friendship feel forbidden, taboo – another piece of my overall rebellion. Dating Barbra Streisand is like wearing Hot Lava."

During the early-to-mid-1990s, Streisand was in romantic relationships with several high-profile men, including newscaster Peter Jennings, and actors Liam Neeson, Jon Voight, and Peter Weller.

Her second husband is actor James Brolin, whom she married on July 1, 1998. They have no children together. Brolin has two sons from his first marriage, including actor Josh Brolin, and one daughter from his second marriage.

Streisand has several dogs; she loved her dog Samantha so much that she had her cloned.

In March 2019, Streisand apologized for her controversial statements about Michael Jackson's accusers.

=== Name ===
Streisand changed her name from "Barbara" to "Barbra" because, she said, "I hated the name, but I refused to change it." Streisand further explained: "Well, I was 18 and I wanted to be unique, but I didn't want to change my name because that was too false. You know, people were saying you could be Joanie Sands, or something like that. (My middle name is Joan.) And I said, 'No, let's see, if I take out the 'a,' it's still 'Barbara,' but it's unique." A 1967 biography with a concert program said, "the spelling of her first name is an instance of partial rebellion: she was advised to change her last name and retaliated by dropping an "a" from the first instead."

According to Streisand, her surname is pronounced with an "s" sound "like sand on the beach," not the "z" sound often used. The Apple voice digital assistant Siri originally pronounced her surname wrong, prompting Streisand to personally contact Apple CEO Tim Cook to complain about the pronunciation, which Apple soon corrected.

=== Politics ===
In the early years of her career, Streisand's interest in politics was limited, with the exception of her participation in activities of the anti-nuclear group Women Strike for Peace in 1961 and 1962. In 1968, her political activism increased, and she helped promote the presidential campaign of Eugene McCarthy who held an anti–Vietnam War stance. In July 1968, with Harry Belafonte and others, she performed at the Hollywood Bowl in a fundraising concert sponsored by the Southern Christian Leadership Conference to benefit the poor.

Streisand has been an active supporter of the Democratic Party and many of its causes. She was among the celebrities on President Richard Nixon's 1971 list of political enemies. In 1972, she assisted the presidential campaign of anti-war candidate George McGovern by headlining the benefit concert Four for McGovern, organized by actor Warren Beatty and record producer Lou Adler; her concert recording was released as Live Concert at the Forum. The next year, in association with liberal activist Stanley Sheinbaum and the American Civil Liberties Union, Streisand performed a benefit at the mansion of film mogul Jennings Lang to pay for the legal defense of Daniel Ellsberg of Pentagon Papers fame. Accompanied by a small combo including Marvin Hamlisch on piano, Streisand took paid song requests from the star-studded audience and by telephone to bring the night's total to $50,000.

In 1984, Streisand joined Jane Fonda and ten other television and film industry notables to establish the activist group Hollywood Women's Political Committee (HWPC), the membership eventually growing to 300. The HWPC fought for liberal causes for more than a decade, contributing to the Democratic Party's taking majority control in the 1986 U.S. Senate elections, and in 1992 funding Bill Clinton's presidential election as well as helping to usher in the Year of the Woman by electing more women senators. In 1995 Streisand spoke at Harvard's John F. Kennedy School of Government about the role of the artist as citizen, in support of arts programs and funding.

Streisand was critical of George W. Bush, as she wrote a memo to Democrats expressing her concerns about how the party was not standing up enough to the president.

Streisand is a supporter of LGBT rights and backed the "No on 8" campaign in an unsuccessful attempt to defeat California Proposition 8 of 2008.

In 2012, Streisand stated, "The new laws requiring U.S. citizens to produce photo IDs at the poll are designed to deprive elderly and minority citizens of the precious right to cast their vote. These regressive laws are themselves the most dangerous voter fraud threatening American democracy." Streisand continued her voter rights advocacy in 2020, tweeting a link to VoteRiders, a nonprofit that assists citizens with obtaining voter ID.

A longtime supporter of Israel, Streisand helped celebrate the 90th birthday of Shimon Peres at Jerusalem's international convention center in June 2013. She also performed at two other concerts in Tel Aviv that same week, part of her first concert tour of Israel.

In January 2017, she participated in 2017 Women's March in Los Angeles. Introduced by Rufus Wainwright, Streisand appeared on stage and made a speech.

In an October 2018 interview with Emma Brockes of The Guardian, Streisand discussed the theme of her new album Walls: the danger she believed President Donald Trump posed towards the United States. She said, "This is a dangerous time in this nation, this republic: a man who is corrupt and indecent and is assaulting our institutions. It's really, really frightening. And I just pray that people who are compassionate and respect the truth will come out and vote. I'm saying more than just vote. Vote for Democrats!" In November 2023, she praised President Joe Biden, saying "I like Biden. I think he has done a good job. I think he is compassionate, smart, supports the right things."

== Philanthropy ==
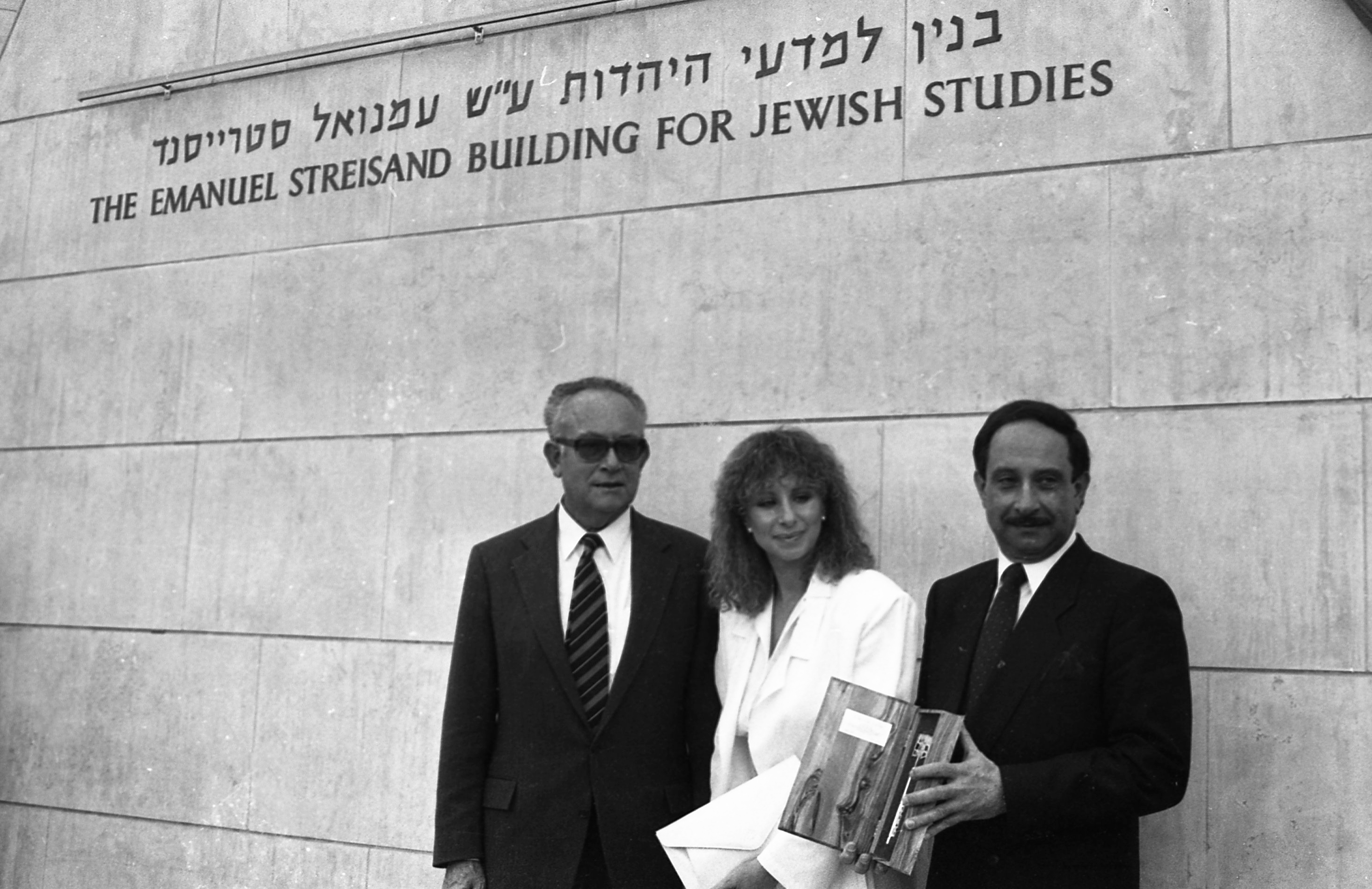
Streisand during the opening ceremony of the Streisand building in the Hebrew University, 1984

In 1984, Streisand donated the Emanuel Streisand Building for Jewish Studies to the Hebrew University of Jerusalem, in the Mount Scopus campus, in memory of her father, an educator and scholar who died when she was young.

Streisand has personally raised $25 million for organizations through her live performances. The Streisand Foundation, established in 1986, has contributed over $16 million through nearly 1,000 grants to "national organizations working on preservation of the environment, voter education, the protection of civil liberties and civil rights, women's issues and nuclear disarmament".

In 2006, Streisand donated $1 million to the William J. Clinton Foundation in support of former President Bill Clinton's climate change initiative.

In 2009, Streisand gifted $5 million to endow the Barbra Streisand Women's Cardiovascular Research and Education Program at Cedars-Sinai Medical Center's Women's Heart Center. In September that year, Parade magazine included Streisand on its Giving Back Fund's second annual Giving Back 30 survey, "a ranking of the celebrities who have made the largest donations to charity in 2007 according to public records", as the third most generous celebrity. The Giving Back Fund claimed Streisand donated $11 million, which The Streisand Foundation distributed. In 2012 she raised $22 million to support her women's cardiovascular center, bringing her own personal contribution to $10 million. The program was officially named the Barbra Streisand Women's Heart Center.

At Julien's Auctions in October 2009, Streisand, a longtime collector of art and furniture, sold 526 items, with all the proceeds going to her foundation. Items included a costume from Funny Lady and a vintage dental cabinet purchased by the performer at 18 years old. The sale's most valuable lot was a painting by Kees van Dongen.

In December 2011, she appeared at a fundraising gala for Israel Defense Forces charities.

In June 2020, she gifted George Floyd's daughter, Gianna Floyd, Disney shares.

On September 22, 2022, Volodymyr Zelenskyy, the president of Ukraine, invited Streisand to become an ambassador for the UNITED24 platform, focusing on the Medical Aid direction of support. Streisand helped raise $240,000 for medical care.

== Legacy ==
Streisand is regarded as the "Queen of the Divas" by various media outlets. The New York Times called her among the three of America's Most Beloved Divas (alongside Dolly Parton and Patti Labelle). Vulture honored her enduring legacy saying her works influence "extends to Céline Dion, the 1980s output of Lionel Richie and Luther Vandross, and the more maudlin ballads of Mariah Carey, Adele, and Whitney Houston." In 2022, Forbes hailed Streisand as the "Queen of the Charts" for her longevity on the Billboard charts, and she was ranked at number 88 on Billboard's 2025 "Top 100 Women Artists of the 21st Century" list. The Los Angeles Times also hailed her as the "most influential female vocalist" and the "most revolutionary of performers" for being responsible for changing the rules for female performers to come. CNN listed her as one of the most romantic singers of the 20th century. In 2023, Rolling Stone ranked Streisand at number 147 on its list of the 200 Greatest Singers of All Time. In 1997, New York magazine acknowledged her fashion sense saying "she embarked on a surreal, chameleonic, personal fashion quest" that single-handedly began the retro revolution in the 1960s.

=== Honors ===
Streisand was presented the Distinguished Merit Award by Mademoiselle in 1964, and selected as Miss Ziegfeld in 1965. In 1968, she received the Israel Freedom Medal, the highest civilian award of Israel, and she was awarded Pied Piper Award by ASCAP and Prix De L'Academie Charles Cros in 1969, Crystal Apple by her hometown City of New York, Woman of Achievement in the Arts by Anti-Defamation League in 1978. In 1984, Streisand was awarded the Women in Film Crystal Award for outstanding women who, through their endurance and the excellence of their work, have helped to expand the role of women within the entertainment industry. She received the Woman of Courage Award by the National Organization for Women (NOW), the Ordre des Arts et des Lettres and Scopus Award by American Friends of the Hebrew University.

She received Breakthrough Awards for "making films that portray women with serious complexity" at the Women, Men and Media symposium in 1991. In 1992, she was given the Commitment to Life Award by AIDS Project Los Angeles (APLA), and the Bill of Rights Award by the American Civil Liberties Union of Southern California, the Dorothy Arzner Special Recognition by Women in Film, and the Golden Plate by the Academy of Achievement. She was honored with the Harry Chapin Humanitarian Award from the ASCAP in 1994 and the Peabody Award in 1995, the same year she was accorded an Honorary Doctorate in Arts and Humanities by Brandeis University. She was also awarded Filmmaker of the Year Award for "lifetime achievement in filmmaking" by ShowEast and Peabody Award in 1996, Christopher Award in 1998.

In 2000, President Bill Clinton presented Streisand with the National Medal of Arts, the highest honor specifically given for achievement in the arts, and Library of Congress Living Legend, she also received the highest honor for a career in film AFI Life Achievement Award from American Film Institute and Liberty and Justice Award from Rainbow/PUSH Coalition, Gracie Allen Award, First Annual Jewish Image Awards in 2001, and Humanitarian Award "for her years of leadership, vision, and activism in the fight for civil liberties, including religion, race, gender equality, and freedom of speech, as well as all aspects of gay rights" from Human Rights Campaign in 2004. In 2007, French President Nicolas Sarkozy presented Streisand with Legion of Honour, the highest decoration in France, and President George W. Bush presented her Kennedy Center Honors, the highest recognition of cultural achievement.

In 2011, she was given Board of Governors Humanitarian Award for her efforts on behalf of women's heart health and her many other philanthropic activities." by Cedars-Sinai Heart Institute. She received the L'Oréal Paris Legend Award in 18th Elle Magazine Women in Hollywood. In 2012, she received a Lifetime Achievement Award from the Women Film Critics Circle. She was accorded an Honorary Doctorate of Philosophy by the Hebrew University of Jerusalem in 2013. In that year, she was also recipient of the Charlie Chaplin Award for Lifetime Achievement by the Film Society of Lincoln Center as the only female artist to direct, write, produce, and star in the same major studio film, Yentl, along with a Lifetime Achievement Glamour Awards.

In 2014, Streisand was on one of eight different New York Magazine covers celebrating the magazine's "100 Years, 100 Songs, 100 Nights: A Century of Pop Music in New York". She also received the American Society of Cinematographers (ASC) Board of Governors Award, the Sherry Lansing Leadership Award at The Hollywood Reporter's annual Women in Entertainment Breakfast, and came first in the 1010 Wins Iconic Celebrity Poll by CBS in 2015. In November 2015, President Barack Obama announced that Streisand would receive the Presidential Medal of Freedom, the highest civilian award of the United States.

Streisand was inducted into and Hollywood Walk of Fame in 1976, Goldmine Hall of Fame in 2002, Long Island Music Hall of Fame in 2007, the Hit Parade Hall of Fame in 2009, National Museum of American Jewish History, and California Hall of Fame in 2010.

In 1970, she received a Special Tony Award named "Star of the Decade", and was selected "Star of the Decade" by the National Association of Theatre Owners (NATO) in 1980, "Star of Decade" by NATO/ShowWest and President's Award by NARM in 1988. That year she was also named as All-Time Favorite Musical Performer by People's Choice Awards. In 1986, Life named her as one of "Five Hollywood's Most Powerful Women". In 1998, Harris Poll reported that she is the "Most Popular Singer Among Adult Americans of All Ages." She was also featured on VH1's 100 Greatest Women of Rock N Roll, Top 100 Singers of all time by Mojo magazine, named the century's best female singer in a Reuters/Zogby poll, and "Top Female Artist of the Century" by Recording Industry Association of America in 1999. In 2006, Streisand was one of honorees at Oprah Winfrey's white-tie Legends Ball.

In 2015, The Daily Telegraph ranked Streisand as one of the 10 top female singer-songwriters of all time. A&E's Biography magazine ranked Streisand as one of their favorite leading actress of all time, she was also featured on the Voices of the Century list by BBC, the "100 Greatest Movie Stars of Time" list compiled by People, VH1's list of the "200 Greatest Pop Culture Icons of All Time", the "100 Greatest Entertainers of All Time", "ranked at #13" and the "Greatest Movie Star of all time list" by Entertainment Weekly, "The 50 Greatest Actresses of All Time" by AMC, and Billboard Hot 100 All-Time Top Artists. Billboard also ranked Streisand as the top female Jewish musician of all time. As a gay icon, Streisand was named by The Advocate as one of the "25 Coolest Women" and the "9 Coolest Women Appealing to Both Lesbians and Gay Men", and was also placed among the "12 Greatest Female Gay Icons of All Time" by Out magazine. She was recognized as one of the top gay icons of the past three decades by Gay Times.

During the first decade of the 21st century, the American Film Institute celebrated 100 years of the greatest films in American cinema. Four of Streisand's songs were represented on AFI's 100 Years ... 100 Songs, which highlighted "America's Greatest Music in the Movies": "The Way We Were" at No. 8, "Evergreen (Love Theme From A Star Is Born)" at No. 16, "People" at No. 13, and "Don't Rain on My Parade" at No. 46. Many of her films were represented on AFI's 100 Years ... series. AFI's 100 Years ... 100 Laughs, highlighting "the films and film artists that have made audiences laugh throughout the century," ranked What's Up, Doc? at No. 61. AFI's 100 Years ... 100 Passions highlighted the top 100 greatest love stories in American cinema and placed The Way We Were at No. 8, Funny Girl at No. 41, and What's Up, Doc? at No. 68. AFI's Greatest Movie Musicals highlighted the 25 greatest American movie musicals, ranking Funny Girl at No. 16.

The Library of Congress chose Funny Girl for preservation in the National Film Registry in December 2016. When "People" was selected in March 2017 for preservation in the National Recording Registry, Streisand said she was humbled to have the song honored "as part of the flow of our nation's culture."

=== Professional memberships ===
As one of the most acclaimed actresses, singers, directors, writers, composers, producers, designers, photographers and activists in every medium that she's worked in, Streisand is the only artist who is concurrently a member of the American Society of Composers, Authors and Publishers, Screen Actors Guild, American Federation of Television and Radio Artists, Academy of Motion Pictures Arts and Sciences and Actors' Equity Association, as well as the honorary chairwoman of the board of directors of Hadassah's International Research Institute on Women.

=== "Streisand effect" ===
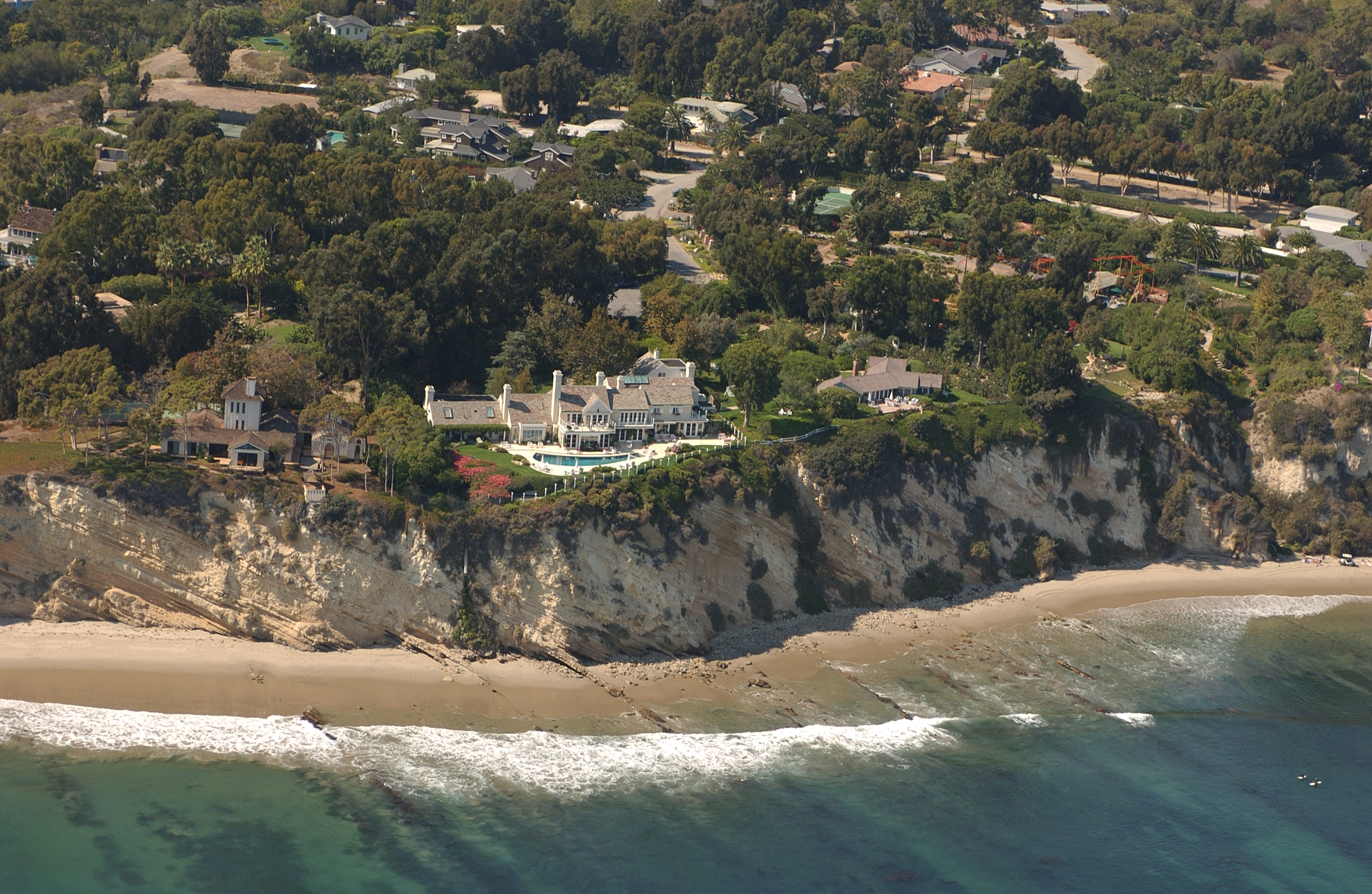
The infamous photo of the Streisand Estate

In a 2003 lawsuit, Streisand claimed that a website illustrating coastal erosion invaded her privacy because one of its more than 12,000 images happened to show her Malibu, California, home; Streisand wanted the photo removed from the site. The suit was dismissed and the resultant publicity prompted hundreds of thousands of people to download the photo, which had been accessed only four times prior to Streisand initiating legal action. The term Streisand effect was coined to refer to an attempt to censor information which unintentionally publicizes that information.

=== Namesakes ===
The Barbra Streisand Cup is a rugby union match held in Sydney, Australia each year played between the Sydney Convicts, Australia's first gay and inclusive Rugby Union club, and the Maccabi Rugby FC, Sydney's only Jewish rugby team. The match is typically played in or around April, between the rival clubs and is named in Streisand's honour as she is known to have a large fan base in both the gay and the Jewish communities.

== Acting credits ==
- Funny Girl (1968)
- Hello, Dolly! (1969)
- On a Clear Day You Can See Forever (1970)
- The Owl and the Pussycat (1970)
- What's Up, Doc? (1972)
- Up the Sandbox (1972)
- The Way We Were (1973)
- For Pete's Sake (1974)
- Funny Lady (1975)
- A Star Is Born (1976)
- The Main Event (1979)
- All Night Long (1981)
- Yentl (1983)
- Nuts (1987)
- The Prince of Tides (1991)
- The Mirror Has Two Faces (1996)
- Meet the Fockers (2004)
- Little Fockers (2010)
- The Guilt Trip (2012)

== Awards and nominations ==
Barbra Streisand is one of the most decorated entertainers in history. She has won two Academy Awards – one for Best Actress in Funny Girl and another for Best Original Song for "Evergreen", making her the first woman to receive the latter. Streisand has earned 10 Grammy Awards, including Album of the Year for The Barbra Streisand Album. She was also awarded the prestigious Grammy Legend Award, an honor received by only 14 other artists, as well as the Grammy Lifetime Achievement Award. She has won five Emmy Awards, comprising four Primetime Emmys and one Daytime Emmy. She has received four Peabody Awards, the Screen Actors Guild Life Achievement Award and nine Golden Globes. Additionally, she received a Special Tony Award in 1970, recognizing her contributions to Broadway. In 2011, she was honored as MusiCares Person of the Year by the Grammy Foundation for her artistic achievement in the music industry.

== Discography ==
- The Barbra Streisand Album (1963)
- The Second Barbra Streisand Album (1963)
- The Third Album (1964)
- People (1964)
- My Name Is Barbra (1965)
- My Name Is Barbra, Two... (1965)
- Color Me Barbra (1966)
- Je m'appelle Barbra (1966)
- Simply Streisand (1967)
- A Christmas Album (1967)
- What About Today? (1969)
- Stoney End (1971)
- Barbra Joan Streisand (1971)
- Barbra Streisand...and Other Musical Instruments (1973)
- The Way We Were (1974)
- ButterFly (1974)
- Lazy Afternoon (1975)
- Classical Barbra (1976)
- Superman (1977)
- Songbird (1978)
- Wet (1979)
- Guilty (1980)
- Emotion (1984)
- The Broadway Album (1985)
- Till I Loved You (1988)
- Back to Broadway (1993)
- Higher Ground (1997)
- A Love Like Ours (1999)
- Christmas Memories (2001)
- The Movie Album (2003)
- Guilty Pleasures (2005)
- Love Is the Answer (2009)
- What Matters Most (2011)
- Partners (2014)
- Encore: Movie Partners Sing Broadway (2016)
- Walls (2018)
- The Secret of Life: Partners, Volume Two (2025)

== Tours ==
According to Pollstar in March 2020, Streisand is the twelfth highest-grossing female artist in the 21st century, grossing $287 million from 69 shows.

| Year | Title | Continents | Box-office proceeds | Total audience |
|---|---|---|---|---|
| 1966 | An Evening with Barbra Streisand Tour | North America | $480,000 | 67,500 |
| 1993–1994 | Barbra Streisand in Concert | North America and Europe | $50 million | 400,000 |
| 1999–2000 | Timeless | North America and Australia | $70 million | 200,000 |
| 2006–2007 | Streisand | North America and Europe | $119.5 million | 425,000 |
| 2012–2013 | Barbra Live | North America and Europe | $66 million | 254,958 |
| 2016–2017 | Barbra: The Music, The Mem'ries, The Magic | North America | $53 million | 203,423 |

== Autobiography ==
Streisand's writing of her autobiography stalled at various stages, and Viking Press announced in May 2015 that they anticipated publishing her long-awaited memoir in 2017, spanning Streisand's entire life and career.

Upon the release of My Name Is Barbra on November 7, 2023, her BBC interview concluded with Streisand claiming she wanted "to have more fun" in life.

== Books ==
- Streisand, Barbra (2023). My Name Is Barbra. New York: Viking Press. ISBN 9780525429524.
- Streisand, Barbra (2027). And By the Way. New York: Penguin Random House. ISBN 9798217041787.
