= List of songs recorded by Barbra Streisand =

Songs by American singer and entertainer

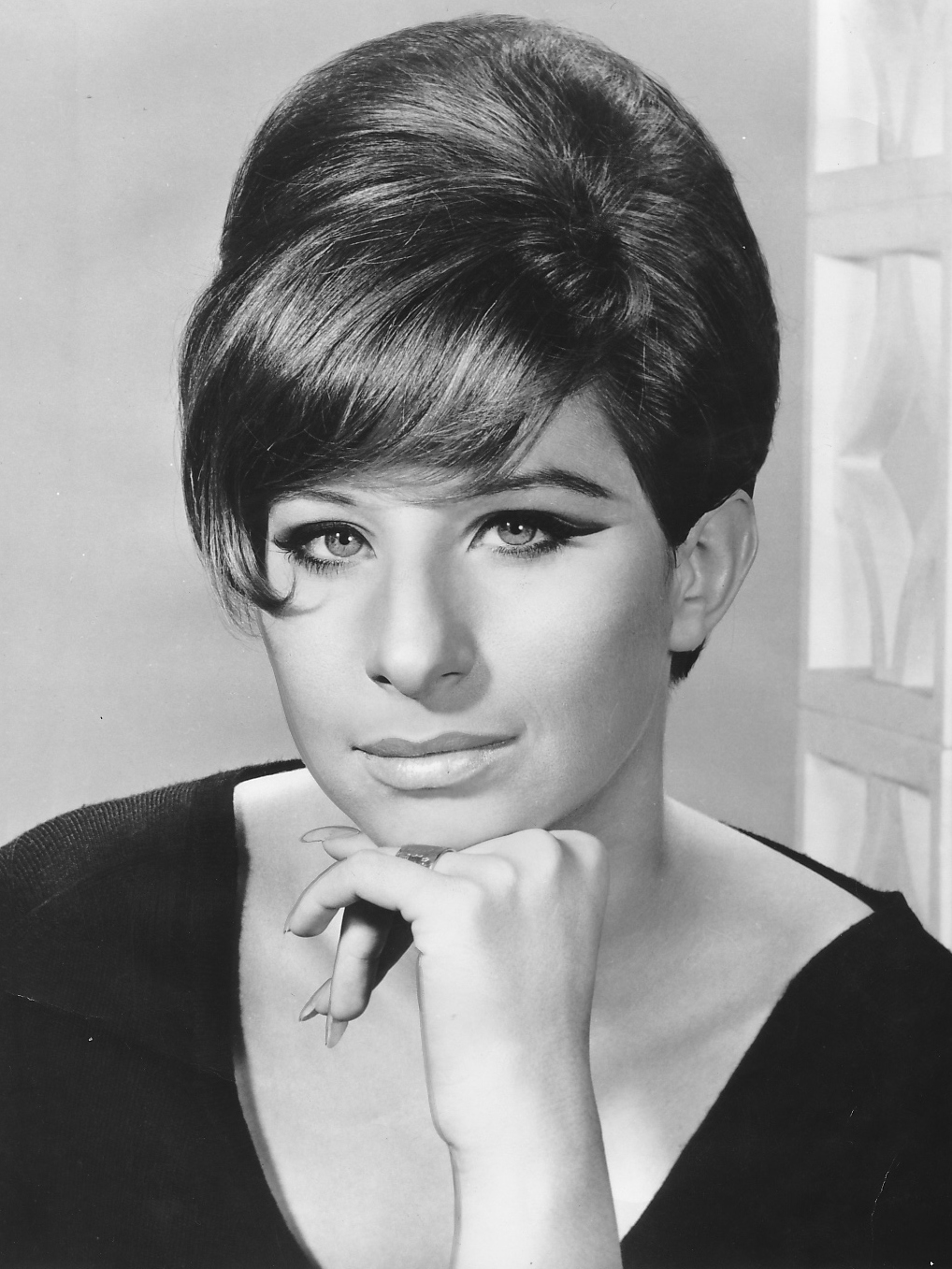
Barbra Streisand in 1965.

American entertainer Barbra Streisand has recorded songs for 37 studio albums, 15 soundtracks, 12 compilations, 11 live albums, and has been featured on songs on compilations or other artists' respective albums. She has also written or co-written several of her songs.

According to the Recording Industry Association of America, Streisand is the second-best-selling female album artist in the United States with 68.5 million certified albums in the country, and a career total ranging from 150 to 200 million making her one of the best-selling music artists of all time.

Different recordings of the same songs have been listed separately. For songs released years after being recorded, separate recording and release years have been listed.

== Songs ==
Key
†	Indicates songs covered by Barbra Streisand
‡	Indicates songs written or co-written by Barbra Streisand

Name of song, performer(s), writer(s), original release, year of recording and year of release
Song	Performer(s)	Writer(s)	Album	Year recorded	Year released	Ref(s).
"Above the Law"	Barbra Streisand and Barry Gibb	Ashley Gibb; Barbra Streisand; Barry Gibb; Stephen Gibb	Guilty Pleasures	2005		
"Absent Minded Me"	Barbra Streisand	Bob Merrill; Jule Styne	People	1964		
"Adelaide's Lament"	Barbra Streisand	Frank Loesser	The Broadway Album	1985		
"After the Rain"	Barbra Streisand	Alan Bergman; Marilyn Bergman; Michel Legrand	Wet	1979		
"Alfie"	Barbra Streisand	Burt Bacharach; Hal David	What About Today?	1969		
"All I Ask of You"	Barbra Streisand	Andrew Lloyd Webber; Charles Hart; Richard Stilgoe	Till I Loved You	1988		
"All I Know of Love"	Barbra Streisand and Josh Groban	David Foster; Linda Thompson; Alberto Testa; Tony Renis	Duets	2002		
"All in Love Is Fair"	Barbra Streisand	Stevie Wonder	The Way We Were	1974		
"All Of My Life"	Barbra Streisand	Barbra Streisand; Marvin Hamlisch; Alan Bergman; Marilyn Bergman	The Mirror Has Two Faces	1996		
"All That I Want"	Barbra Streisand	Francine Forest; Neil Wolfe	My Name Is Barbra, Two...	1965		
"All the Children"	Barbra Streisand	Ashley Gibb; Barry Gibb; Stephen Gibb	Guilty Pleasures	2005		
"All the Things You Are"	Barbra Streisand	Oscar Hammerstein II; Jerome Kern	Simply Streisand	1967		
"Alone In the World"	Barbra Streisand	Alan Bergman; Marilyn Bergman; Jerry Goldsmith	What Matters Most	2011		
"Am I Blue"	Barbra Streisand	Harry Akst	Funny Lady	1975		
"America the Beautiful" (Live)	Barbra Streisand	Katharine Lee Bates; Samuel A. Ward	One Voice	1986	1987	
"An Sylvia, D.891"	Barbra Streisand	Franz Schubert	Classical Barbra (reissue)	1973	2013	
"Answer Me"	Barbra Streisand	Barbra Streisand; Paul Williams; Kenny Ascher	Superman	1977		
"Any Moment Now"	Barbra Streisand and Hugh Jackman	Marvin Hamlisch; Carolyn Leigh	Encore: Movie Partners Sing Broadway	2016		
"Any Place I Hang My Hat Is Home"	Barbra Streisand	Harold Arlen; Johnny Mercer	The Second Barbra Streisand Album	1963		
"Anything You Can Do"	Barbra Streisand and Melissa McCarthy	Irving Berlin	Encore: Movie Partners Sing Broadway	2016		
"The Apartment"	Barbra Streisand	Barbra Streisand	Nuts	1987		
"Après un rêve"	Barbra Streisand	Gabriel Fauré	Classical Barbra	1973	1976	
"As If We Never Said Goodbye"	Barbra Streisand	Don Black; Christopher Hampton; Andrew Lloyd Webber	Back to Broadway	1993		
"As Time Goes By"	Barbra Streisand	Herman Hupfeld	The Third Album	1964		
"Ask Yourself Why"	Barbra Streisand	Alan Bergman; Marilyn Bergman; Michel Legrand	What About Today?	1969		
"At the Ballet"	Barbra Streisand, Anne Hathaway and Daisy Ridley	Edward Kleban; Marvin Hamlisch	Encore: Movie Partners Sing Broadway	2016		
"At the Same Time"	Barbra Streisand	Ann Hampton Callaway	Higher Ground	1997		
"Auf dem Wasser zu singen, D.774"	Barbra Streisand	Franz Schubert	Classical Barbra (reissue)	1973	2013	
"Auld Lang Syne (Ballad)" (Live)	Barbra Streisand	Robert Burns	Timeless: Live in Concert	2000		
"Autumn"	Barbra Streisand	Richard Maltby, Jr. David Shire	People	1964		
"Autumn Leaves" (Note: "Autumn Leaves" is an English cover of "Les Feuilles mortes", originally performed by Roger Williams.)	Barbra Streisand	Joseph Kosma; Johnny Mercer; Jacques Prévert	Je m'appelle Barbra	1966		
"Ave Maria"	Barbra Streisand	Franz Schubert	Christmas Memories	2001		
"Avinu Malkeinu"	Barbra Streisand	Max Janowski	Higher Ground	1997		
"Baby Me Baby"	Barbra Streisand	Roger Miller	Superman	1977		
"Ballad of the Garment Trade"	Barbra Streisand, Elliott Gould, Marilyn Cooper, Ken LeRoy and Bambi Linn	Harold Rome	I Can Get It for You Wholesale	1962		
"The Bar"	Barbra Streisand	Barbra Streisand; Richard Baskin	Nuts	1987		
"Be Aware"	Barbra Streisand	Burt Bacharach; Hal David	Release Me 2	1971	2021	
"Beau Soir"	Barbra Streisand	Claude Debussy	Classical Barbra	1973	1976	
"Beautiful"	Barbra Streisand	Carole King	Barbra Joan Streisand	1971		
"Before the Parade Passes By"	Barbra Streisand	Jerry Herman	Hello, Dolly!	1969		
"Being Alive"	Barbra Streisand	Stephen Sondheim	The Broadway Album	1985		
"Being at War with Each Other"	Barbra Streisand	Carole King	The Way We Were	1974		
"Being Good Isn't Good Enough"	Barbra Streisand	Jule Styne; Betty Comden; Adolph Green	Release Me	1985	2012	
"The Best Gift"	Barbra Streisand	Lan O'Kun	A Christmas Album	1967		
"Best I Could"	Barbra Streisand	Bobby Whiteside; Richard Parker	Emotion	1984		
"The Best Thing That Has Ever Happened"	Barbra Streisand and Alec Baldwin	Stephen Sondheim	Encore: Movie Partners Sing Broadway	2016		
"The Best Thing You've Ever Done"	Barbra Streisand	Martin Charnin	The Way We Were	1970 (Note: "The Best Thing You've Ever Done" and "Summer Me, Winter Me" were released as a non-album single in 1970. In 1974 they were included on The Way We Were.)		
"Better Angels"	Barbra Streisand	Carole Bayer Sager; Jonas Myrin; Jay Landers	Walls	2018		
"Between Yesterday and Tomorrow"	Barbra Streisand	Alan Bergman; Marilyn Bergman; Michel Legrand	Just for the Record...	1973 (Note: Recorded for the unreleased album Life Cycle of a Woman.)	1991	
"Bewitched, Bothered and Bewildered" (Live)	Barbra Streisand	Lorenz Hart; Richard Rodgers	Live at the Bon Soir	1962 (Note: Performed at the Bon Soir.)	2022	
"Bewitched, Bothered and Bewildered"	Barbra Streisand	Lorenz Hart; Richard Rodgers	The Third Album	1964		
"Blind Date"	Barbra Streisand	Fred Ebb; John Kander	Funny Lady	1975		
"The Boy Next Door"	Barbra Streisand	Ralph Blane; Hugh Martin	Simply Streisand	1967		
"Brezairola - Berceuse"	Barbra Streisand	Joseph Canteloube	Classical Barbra	1973	1976	
"But Beautiful"	Barbra Streisand	Jimmy Van Heusen; Johnny Burke	The Movie Album	2003		
"By Myself"	Barbra Streisand	Howard Dietz; Arthur Schwartz	Barbra Streisand...and Other Musical Instruments	1973		
"By the Way"	Barbra Streisand	Barbra Streisand; Rupert Holmes	Lazy Afternoon	1975		
"C'est si Bon"	Barbra Streisand	André Hornez; Jerry Seelen; Henri Betti	Color Me Barbra	1966		
"Cabin Fever"	Barbra Streisand	Ron Nagle	Superman	1977		
"Calling You"	Barbra Streisand	Robert Telson	The Movie Album	2003		
"Can You Tell the Moment?"	Barbra Streisand	Alan Bergman; Marilyn Bergman; Michel Legrand	Just for the Record...	1973	1991	
"Can't Help Lovin' That Man"	Barbra Streisand	Oscar Hammerstein II; Jerome Kern	The Broadway Album	1985		
"Carefully Taught" / "Children Will Listen" (Live)	Barbra Streisand	Richard Rodgers; Oscar Hammerstein II; Stephen Sondheim	Live in Concert 2006	2006	2007	
"A Child Is Born"	Barbra Streisand	Alan Bergman; Marilyn Bergman; Dave Grusin	Lazy Afternoon	1975		
"Children Will Listen"	Barbra Streisand	Stephen Sondheim	Back to Broadway	1993		
"A Christmas Love Song"	Barbra Streisand	Alan Bergman; Marilyn Bergman; Johnny Mandel	Christmas Memories	2001		
"Christmas Lullaby"	Barbra Streisand	Ann Hampton Callaway	Christmas Memories	2001		
"Christmas Mem'ries"	Barbra Streisand	Alan Bergman; Marilyn Bergman; Don Costa	Christmas Memories	2001		
"The Christmas Song (Chestnuts Roasting on an Open Fire)"	Barbra Streisand	Mel Tormé; Bob Wells	A Christmas Album	1967		
"Circle"	Barbra Streisand	Jud Friedman; Cynthia Weil	Higher Ground	1997		
"Clear Sailing"	Barbra Streisand	Peter McIan; Anne Black Montgomery	Emotion	1984		
"The Clicker Blues (Live)"	Barbra Streisand	Marvin Hamlisch; Alan Bergman; Marilyn Bergman	Timeless: Live in Concert	2000		
"Climb Ev'ry Mountain"	Barbra Streisand and Jamie Foxx	Richard Rodgers; Oscar Hammerstein II	Encore: Movie Partners Sing Broadway	2016		
"Clopin clopant" (Note: "Clopin clopant" is an English cover of "Clopin clopant", originally performed by Pierre Dudan.)	Barbra Streisand	Bruno Coquatrix; Pierre Dudan; Kermit Goell	Je m'appelle Barbra	1966		
"Closer"	Barbra Streisand	Dean Pitchford; Tom Snow	Christmas Memories	2001		
"A Cockeyed Optimist" (Live)	Barbra Streisand	Richard Rodgers; Oscar Hammerstein II	Live in Concert 2006	2006	2007	
"Come Back to Me"	Barbra Streisand	Alan Jay Lerner; Burton Lane	Barbra Streisand...and Other Musical Instruments	1973		
"Come Rain or Come Shine" (Live)	Barbra Streisand featuring Harold Arlen	Harold Arlen; Johnny Mercer	Just for the Record...	1969 (Note: Performed at the Friars Club.)	1991	
"Come Rain or Come Shine"	Barbra Streisand	Harold Arlen; Johnny Mercer	Wet	1979		
"Come Rain or Come Shine"	Barbra Streisand and John Mayer	Harold Arlen; Johnny Mercer	Partners	2014		
"Come to the Supermarket (in Old Peking)" (Live)	Barbra Streisand	Cole Porter	Live at the Bon Soir	1962	2022	
"Come to the Supermarket in Old Peking"	Barbra Streisand	Cole Porter	The Barbra Streisand Album	1963		
"Come Tomorrow"	Barbra Streisand and Barry Gibb	Ashley Gibb; Barry Gibb; Stephen Gibb	Guilty Pleasures	2005		
"Comin' In and Out of Your Life"	Barbra Streisand	Richard Parker; Bobby Whiteside	Memories	1981		
"The Confrontation"	Barbra Streisand and George Segal	Buck Henry	The Owl and the Pussycat	1970		
"Cornet Man"	Barbra Streisand	Bob Merrill; Jule Styne	Funny Girl (Original Broadway Cast Recording)	1964		
"Cry Me a River" (Live)	Barbra Streisand	Arthur Hamilton	Just for the Record...	1962	1991	
"Cry Me a River"	Barbra Streisand	Arthur Hamilton	The Barbra Streisand Album	1963		
"Crying Time"	Barbra Streisand and Ray Charles	Buck Owens	Just for the Record...	1973	1991	
"Crying Time"	Barbra Streisand	Buck Owens	ButterFly	1974		
"Dancing"	Barbra Streisand and Michael Crawford	Jerry Herman	Hello, Dolly!	1969		
"Dank sei Dir, Herr"	Barbra Streisand	Unknown	Classical Barbra	1973	1976	
"Deep in the Night"	Barbra Streisand	Helen Miller; Eve Merriam	Songbird	1978		
"De rêve en rêverie" (Note: "De rêve en rêverie" is a French version of "Evergreen".)	Barbra Streisand	Barbra Streisand; Paul Williams; Eddy Marnay	Non-album single (Note: "De rêve en rêverie" was released on a French version of "Evergreen".)	1977		
"Didn't We"	Barbra Streisand	Jimmy Webb	Release Me	1970	2012	
"Didn't We" (Live)	Barbra Streisand	Jimmy Webb	Live Concert at the Forum	1972		
"Ding-Dong! The Witch Is Dead"	Harold Arlen and Barbra Streisand	Harold Arlen; E.Y. "Yip" Harburg	Harold Sings Arlen (With Friend)	1966		
"Doing the Reactionary"	Barbra Streisand	Harold Rome	Pins and Needles	1962		
"Don't Believe What You Read"	Barbra Streisand	Barbra Streisand; Ron Nagle; Scott Mathews	Superman	1977		
"Don't Ever Leave Me"	Barbra Streisand	Jerome Kern; Oscar Hammerstein II	Barbra Streisand...and Other Musical Instruments	1973		
"Don't Lie to Me"	Barbra Streisand	Barbra Streisand; John Shanks; Jonas Myrin; Jay Landers	Walls	2018		
"Don't Like Goodbyes"	Barbra Streisand	Harold Arlen; Truman Capote	People	1964		
"Don't Rain on My Parade"	Barbra Streisand	Bob Merrill; Jule Styne	Funny Girl (Original Broadway Cast Recording)	1964		
"Don't Rain on My Parade"	Barbra Streisand	Bob Merrill; Jule Styne	Funny Girl	1968		
"Don't Rain on My Parade"	Barbra Streisand	Bob Merrill; Jule Styne	Barbra Streisand...and Other Musical Instruments	1973		
"Don't Rain on My Parade (Reprise)"	Barbra Streisand	Bob Merrill; Jule Styne	Funny Girl (Original Broadway Cast Recording)	1964		
"Down With Love"	Barbra Streisand	Harold Arlen; E. Y. Harburg	The Second Barbra Streisand Album	1963		
"Draw Me a Circle"	Barbra Streisand	Cy Young	The Third Album	1964		
"Emily" (Note: "Emily" included new lyrics written by Alan and Marilyn Bergman.)	Barbra Streisand	Johnny Mercer; Alan Bergman; Marilyn Bergman; Johnny Mandel	The Movie Album	2003		
"Emotion"	Barbra Streisand	Peter Bliss	Emotion	1984		
"The End Credits"	Barbra Streisand	Barbra Streisand	Nuts	1987		
"Et la mer"	Barbra Streisand	Eddy Marnay; Michel Legrand	Barbra Streisand En Français	1966		
"Evergreen" (Note: "Evergreen" is alternatively called "Evergreen (Love Theme from A Star Is Born)".)	Barbra Streisand	Barbra Streisand; Paul Williams	A Star Is Born	1976		
"Evergreen"	Barbra Streisand and Babyface	Barbra Streisand; Paul Williams	Partners	2014		
"Evergreen (Reprise)"	Barbra Streisand	Barbra Streisand; Paul Williams	A Star Is Born	1976		
"Everybody Says Don't"	Barbra Streisand	Stephen Sondheim	Back to Broadway	1993		
"Everything"	Barbra Streisand	Paul Williams; Kenny Ascher	A Star Is Born	1976		
"Everything Must Change"	Barbra Streisand	Bernard Ighner	Higher Ground	1997		
"Everytime You Hear Auld Lang Syne" (Live)	Barbra Streisand	Marvin Hamlisch; Alan Bergman; Marilyn Bergman	Timeless: Live in Concert	2000		
"Fifty Percent"	Barbra Streisand	Billy Goldenberg; Alan Bergman; Marilyn Bergman	Encore: Movie Partners Sing Broadway (deluxe edition)	2016		
"Finale"	Barbra Streisand	Bob Merrill; Jule Styne	Funny Girl	1968		
"Finale"	Walter Matthau, Barbra Streisand and Michael Crawford	Jerry Herman	Hello, Dolly!	1969		
"The Finale"	Barbra Streisand	Barbra Streisand	Nuts	1987		
"Fine and Dandy"	Barbra Streisand	Kay Swift; Paul James	People	1964		
"The First Time Ever I Saw Your Face"	Barbra Streisand and Hozier	Ewan MacColl	The Secret of Life: Partners, Volume Two	2025		
"Folk Monologue / Value" (Live)	Barbra Streisand	Jeffrey D. Harris	A Happening in Central Park	1967	1968	
"For All We Know"	Barbra Streisand	John Frederick Coots; Sam M. Lewis	The Prince of Tides	1991		
"Fragile"	Barbra Streisand and Sting	Sting	The Secret of Life: Partners, Volume Two	2025		
"Frank Mills"	Barbra Streisand	Gerome Ragni; James Rado; Galt MacDermot	Non-album single	1969		
"Free Again" (Note: "Free Again" is an English cover of "Non, c'est rien", originally performed by Jacqueline Danno.)	Barbra Streisand	Joss Baselli; Armand Canfora; Robert Colby; Michel Jourdan	Je m'appelle Barbra	1966		
"Free the People"	Barbra Streisand	Barbara Keith	Stoney End	1971		
"Funny Girl"	Barbra Streisand	Bob Merrill; Jule Styne	Non-album single	1964		
"Funny Girl"	Barbra Streisand	Bob Merrill; Jule Styne	Non-album single	1968		
"Funny Girl"	Barbra Streisand	Bob Merrill; Jule Styne	Funny Girl	1968		
"Gentle Rain"	Barbra Streisand	Luiz Bonfá; Matt Dubey	Love Is the Answer	2009		
"Get Happy" / "Happy Days Are Here Again" (Live)	Judy Garland and Barbra Streisand	Harold Arlen; Ted Koehler; Milton Ager; Jack Yellen	Just for the Record...	1963 (Note: Performed on The Judy Garland Show.)	1991	
"Glad to Be Unhappy"	Barbra Streisand	Richard Rodgers; Lorenz Hart	Barbra Streisand...and Other Musical Instruments	1973		
"Go to Sleep"	Barbra Streisand	Burton Lane; Alan Jay Lerner	On a Clear Day You Can See Forever	1970		
"God Bless America" (Live)	Barbra Streisand	Irving Berlin	Christmas Memories (deluxe edition)	1992 (Note: Performed at the Voices For Change fundraiser.)	2001	
"God Bless the Child?"	Barbra Streisand	Billie Holiday; Arthur Herzog Jr.	Just for the Record...	1974 (Note: Recorded for ButterFly.)	1991	
"Golden Dawn"	Barbra Streisand	Ashley Gibb; Barry Gibb; Stephen Gibb	Guilty Pleasures	2005		
"A Good Man Is Hard to Find / Some of These Days" (Live)	Barbra Streisand	Eddie Green; Shelton Brooks	Just for the Record...	1967 (Note: Recorded for TV special Belle of 14th Street.)	1991	
"Goodbye for Now"	Barbra Streisand	Stephen Sondheim	The Movie Album	2003		
"Goodnight"	Barbra Streisand	John Lennon; Paul McCartney	What About Today?	1969		
"Gotta Move"	Barbra Streisand	Peter Matz	The Second Barbra Streisand Album	1963		
"Gotta Move"	Barbra Streisand	Peter Matz	Color Me Barbra	1966		
"Gounod's Ave Maria"	Barbra Streisand	Charles Gounod	A Christmas Album	1967		
"Gounod's Ave Maria" (English version)	Barbra Streisand	Charles Gounod	Baby, It’s Cold Outside	1967	2005	
"Grandma's Hands"	Barbra Streisand	Bill Withers	ButterFly	1974		
"Grown-Up Christmas List"	Barbra Streisand	David Foster; Linda Thompson	Christmas Memories	2001		
"Guava Jelly"	Barbra Streisand	Bob Marley	ButterFly	1974		
"Guilty"	Barbra Streisand and Barry Gibb	Barry Gibb; Maurice Gibb; Robin Gibb	Guilty	1980		
"Hands Off the Man (Flim Flam Man)"	Barbra Streisand	Laura Nyro	Stoney End	1971		
"Happy Days Are Here Again" (Live)	Barbra Streisand	Milton Ager; Jack Yellen	Live at the Bon Soir	1962	2022	
"Happy Days Are Here Again" (Live)	Barbra Streisand	Milton Ager; Jack Yellen	Just for the Record...	1962 (Note: Performed on The Garry Moore Show.)	1991	
"Happy Days Are Here Again"	Barbra Streisand	Milton Ager; Jack Yellen	The Barbra Streisand Album	1963		
"Happy Days Are Here Again"	Barbra Streisand	Milton Ager; Jack Yellen	Walls	2018		
"Hatikvah" (Live)	Barbra Streisand featuring Golda Meir	Naftali Herz Imber	Just for the Record...	1978 (Note: Performed at the TV special The Stars Salute Israel at 30.)	1991	
"Have Yourself a Merry Little Christmas"	Barbra Streisand	Ralph Blane; Hugh Martin	A Christmas Album	1967		
"He Could Show Me"	Barbra Streisand	Nancy Ford; Gretchen Cryer	B-side to "Our Corner of the Night"	1968		
"He Isn't You"	Barbra Streisand	Burton Lane; Alan Jay Lerner	On a Clear Day You Can See Forever	1970		
"He Touched Me"	Barbra Streisand	Ira Levin; Milton Schafer	My Name Is Barbra, Two...	1965		
"Heart Don't Change My Mind"	Barbra Streisand	Diane Warren; Robbie Buchanan	Emotion	1984		
"Hello, Dolly!"	Barbra Streisand and Louis Armstrong	Jerry Herman	Hello, Dolly!	1969		
"Here We Are at Last"	Barbra Streisand	Barbra Streisand; Richard Baskin	Emotion	1984		
"Here's That Rainy Day"	Barbra Streisand	Johnny Burke; Jimmy Van Heusen	Love Is the Answer	2009		
"Here's to Life"	Barbra Streisand	Artie Butler; Phyllis Molinary	Love Is the Answer	2009		
"Hideaway"	Barbra Streisand	Ashley Gibb; Barry Gibb	Guilty Pleasures	2005		
"Higher Ground"	Barbra Streisand	Kent Agee; Steve Dorff; George Green	Higher Ground	1997		
"His Love Makes Me Beautiful"	John Lankston, Barbra Streisand and Funny Girl cast	Bob Merrill; Jule Styne	Funny Girl (Original Broadway Cast Recording)	1964		
"His Love Makes Me Beautiful"	Barbra Streisand	Bob Merrill; Jule Styne	Funny Girl	1968		
"Home"	Barbra Streisand	Charlie Smalls	Release Me	1985	2012	
"Honey Can I Put on Your Clothes"	Barbra Streisand	Jean Monte Ray; Jerry Leiber; Mike Stoller	Songbird	1978		
"Honey Pie"	Barbra Streisand	John Lennon; Paul McCartney	What About Today?	1969		
"The Hospital"	Barbra Streisand	Barbra Streisand	Nuts	1987		
"House of Flowers"	Harold Arlen and Barbra Streisand	Harold Arlen; Truman Capote	Harold Sings Arlen (With Friend)	1966		
"How Are Things in Glocca Morra?" / "Heather on the Hill"	Barbra Streisand	Burton Lane; E.Y. "Yip" Harburg; Alan Jay Lerner; Frederick Loewe	Release Me	1988	2012	
"How Deep Is the Ocean" (Live)	Barbra Streisand and Jason Gould	Irving Berlin	Back to Brooklyn	2012	2013	
"How Deep Is the Ocean"	Barbra Streisand and Jason Gould	Irving Berlin	Partners	2014		
"How Do You Keep the Music Playing?"	Barbra Streisand	Alan Bergman; Marilyn Bergman; Michel Legrand	The Movie Album	2003		
"How Does the Wine Taste?"	Barbra Streisand	Matt Dubey; Harold Karr	People	1964		
"How Lucky Can You Get"	Barbra Streisand	Fred Ebb; John Kander	Funny Lady	1975		
"How Much of the Dream Comes True"	Barbra Streisand	John Barry; Trevor Peacock	My Name Is Barbra, Two...	1965		
"Hurry! It's Lovely Up Here"	Barbra Streisand	Burton Lane; Alan Jay Lerner	On a Clear Day You Can See Forever	1970		
"I Ain't Gonna Cry Tonight"	Barbra Streisand	Alan Gordon	Wet	1979		
"I Am Woman" (Note: "I Am Woman" is a solo version of "You Are Woman, I Am Man".)	Barbra Streisand	Bob Merrill; Jule Styne	B-side to "People" (Note: "I Am Woman" was included on the 2002 international reissue of People (1964).)	1964		
"I Believe" / "You'll Never Walk Alone"	Barbra Streisand	Ervin Drake; Irvin Graham; Jimmy Shirl; Al Stillman; Oscar Hammerstein II; Richard Rodgers	Higher Ground	1997		
"I Believe" / "Somewhere" (Live)	Barbra Streisand and Lauren Frost	Ervin Drake; Irvin Graham; Jimmy Shirl; Al Stillman; Stephen Sondheim; Leonard Bernstein	Timeless: Live in Concert	2000		
"I Believe in Love"	Barbra Streisand	Kenny Loggins; Alan Bergman; Marilyn Bergman	A Star Is Born	1976		
"I Can Do It"	Barbra Streisand	Johnny Worth	Just for the Record...	1970	1991	
"I Can See It"	Barbra Streisand	Tom Jones; Harvey Schmidt	My Name Is Barbra	1965		
"I Didn't Know What Time It Was"	Barbra Streisand	Richard Rodgers; Lorenz Hart	Encore: Movie Partners Sing Broadway (deluxe edition)	2016		
"I Don't Break Easily"	Barbra Streisand	Bruce Roberts	Songbird	1978		
"I Don't Care Much"	Barbra Streisand	Fred Ebb; John Kander	The Second Barbra Streisand Album	1963		
"I Don't Know Where I Stand"	Barbra Streisand	Joni Mitchell	Stoney End	1971		
"I Finally Found Someone"	Barbra Streisand and Bryan Adams	Barbra Streisand; Bryan Adams; Marvin Hamlisch; Mutt Lange	The Mirror Has Two Faces	1996		
"I Found a Million Dollar Baby (in a Five and Ten Cent Store)"	Barbra Streisand	Harry Warren	Funny Lady	1975		
"I Found You Love"	Barbra Streisand	Alan Gordon	Superman	1977		
"I Got a Code in My Doze"	Barbra Streisand	Arthur Fields; Billy Rose	Funny Lady	1975		
"I Got Plenty of Nothin'"	Barbra Streisand	George Gershwin; Ira Gershwin; DuBose Heyward	My Name Is Barbra, Two...	1965		
"I Got Rhythm"	Barbra Streisand	George Gershwin; Ira Gershwin	Barbra Streisand...and Other Musical Instruments	1973		
"I Had Myself a True Love" (Live)	Barbra Streisand	Harold Arlen; Johnny Mercer	Just for the Record...	1962	1991	
"I Had Myself a True Love"	Barbra Streisand	Harold Arlen; Johnny Mercer	The Third Album	1964		
"I Hate Music" (Live)	Barbra Streisand	Leonard Bernstein	Just for the Record...	1962	1991	
"I Have a Love/One Hand, One Heart"	Barbra Streisand and Johnny Mathis	Stephen Sondheim; Leonard Bernstein	Back to Broadway	1993		
"I Have Dreamed" / "We Kiss in a Shadow" / "Something Wonderful"	Barbra Streisand	Oscar Hammerstein II; Richard Rodgers	The Broadway Album	1985		
"I Know Him So Well"	Barbra Streisand	Tim Rice; Benny Andersson; Björn Ulvaeus	Just for the Record... (Note: "I Know Him So Well" was also included on the 2002 international reissue of The Broadway Album.)	1985 (Note: Recorded for The Broadway Album.)	1991	
"I Love Us"	Barbra Streisand and Tim McGraw	Bill Anderson; Steve Dorff	The Secret of Life: Partners, Volume Two	2025		
"I Loves You, Porgy" / "Porgy, I's Your Woman Now (Bess, You Is My Woman)"	Barbra Streisand	George Gershwin; Ira Gershwin; DuBose Heyward	The Broadway Album	1985		
"I Loved You"	Barbra Streisand	Claus Ogerman	Classical Barbra	1973	1976	
"I Mean to Shine"	Barbra Streisand	Donald Fagen; Walter Becker	Barbra Joan Streisand	1971		
"I Never Had It So Good"	Barbra Streisand	Paul Williams; Roger Nichols	Lazy Afternoon	1975		
"I Never Has Seen Snow"	Barbra Streisand	Harold Arlen; Truman Capote	Barbra Streisand...and Other Musical Instruments	1973		
"I Never Meant to Hurt You"	Barbra Streisand	Laura Nyro	Barbra Joan Streisand	1971		
"I Remember"	Barbra Streisand	Stephen Sondheim	Christmas Memories	2001		
"I Stayed Too Long at the Fair" (Live)	Barbra Streisand	Billy Barnes	Live at the Bon Soir	1962	2022	
"I Stayed Too Long at the Fair"	Barbra Streisand	Billy Barnes	The Second Barbra Streisand Album	1963		
"I Still Can See Your Face"	Barbra Streisand and Andrea Bocelli	Bernie Herms; Charlie Midnight; Jay Landers	Partners	2014		
"I Think It's Going to Rain Today"	Barbra Streisand	Randy Newman	Release Me	1970	2012	
"I Want to Be Seen With You Tonight"	Sydney Chaplin and Barbra Streisand	Bob Merrill; Jule Styne	Funny Girl (Original Broadway Cast Recording)	1964		
"I Wish You Love" (Note: "I Wish You Love" is an English cover of "Que reste-t-il de nos amours ?", originally performed by Lucienne Boyer.)	Barbra Streisand	Albert Askew Beach; Léo Chauliac	Je m'appelle Barbra	1966		
"I Won't Be the One to Let Go"	Barbra Streisand and Barry Manilow	Barry Manilow; Richard Marx	Duets	2002		
"I Won't Last a Day Without You"	Barbra Streisand	Paul Williams; Roger Nichols	ButterFly	1974		
"I Wonder as I Wander"	Barbra Streisand	John Jacob Niles	A Christmas Album	1967		
"I'd Rather Be Blue Over You (Than Be Happy With Somebody Else)"	Barbra Streisand	Billy Rose; Fred Fisher	B-side to "Funny Girl" (Note: The single version of "I'd Rather Be Blue Over You (Than Be Happy With Somebody Else)" was included on the 2002 international reissue of Funny Girl (1964).)	1968		
"I'd Rather Be Blue Over You (Than Be Happy With Somebody Else)"	Barbra Streisand	Billy Rose; Fred Fisher	Funny Girl	1968		
"I'd Want It To Be You"	Barbra Streisand and Willie Nelson	Steve Dorff; Jay Landers; Bobby Tomberlin	Release Me 2	2014	2021	
"I'd Want It To Be You"	Barbra Streisand and Blake Shelton	Steve Dorff; Jay Landers; Bobby Tomberlin	Partners	2014		
"I'll Be Home"	Barbra Streisand	Randy Newman	Stoney End	1971		
"I'll Be Home for Christmas"	Barbra Streisand	Kim Gannon; Walter Kent; Buck Ram	Christmas Memories	2001		
"I'll Be Home for Christmas"	John Travolta and Olivia Newton-John featuring Barbra Streisand	Kim Gannon; Walter Kent; Buck Ram	This Christmas	2012		
"I'll Be Seeing You" / "I've Grown Accustomed to Her Face"	Barbra Streisand and Chris Pine	Irving Kahal; Sammy Fain; Alan Jay Lerner; Frederick Loewe	Encore: Movie Partners Sing Broadway	2016		
"I'll Know"	Barbra Streisand	Frank Loesser	Simply Streisand	1967		
"I'll Know"	Barbra Streisand and Marlon Brando	Frank Loesser	The Concert	1994		
"I'll Never Say Goodbye"	Barbra Streisand	Alan Bergman; Marilyn Bergman; David Shire	What Matters Most	2011		
"I'll Tell the Man in the Street" (Live)	Barbra Streisand	Lorenz Hart; Richard Rodgers	Live at the Bon Soir	1962	2022	
"I'll Tell the Man in the Street"	Barbra Streisand	Lorenz Hart; Richard Rodgers	The Barbra Streisand Album	1963		
"I'm All Smiles"	Barbra Streisand	Michael Leonard; Herbert Martin	People	1964		
"I'm Always Chasing Rainbows" (Live)	Barbra Streisand	Harry Carroll; Joseph McCarthy	Just for the Record...	1967	1991	
"I'm in the Mood for Love"	Barbra Streisand	Dorothy Fields; Jimmy McHugh	The Movie Album	2003		
"I'm Not a Well Man"	Barbra Streisand and Jack Kruschen	Harold Rome	I Can Get It for You Wholesale	1962		
"I'm Still Here" / "Everybody Says Don't" / "Don't Rain on My Parade" (Live)	Barbra Streisand	Stephen Sondheim; Bob Merrill; Jule Styne	The Concert	1994		
"I'm the Greatest Star"	Barbra Streisand	Bob Merrill; Jule Styne	Funny Girl (Original Broadway Cast Recording)	1964		
"I'm the Greatest Star"	Barbra Streisand	Bob Merrill; Jule Styne	Funny Girl	1968		
"I've Been Here" (Note: "I've Been Here" is an English version of "Le Mur".)	Barbra Streisand	Charles Dumont; Earl Shuman; Michel Vaucaire	Je m'appelle Barbra	1966		
"I've Dreamed of You" (Note: "I've Dreamed of You" is a cover of an instrumental song "Heartstrings", written by Rolf Løvland, with original lyrics written by Ann Hampton Callaway.)	Barbra Streisand	Rolf Løvland; Ann Hampton Callaway	A Love Like Ours	1999		
"I've Got a Crush on You"	Frank Sinatra and Barbra Streisand	George Gershwin; Ira Gershwin	Duets	1993		
"I've Got No Strings"	Barbra Streisand	Leigh Harline; Ned Washington	My Name Is Barbra	1965		
"I've Never Been a Woman Before"	Barbra Streisand	Tom Baird; Ron Miller	The Way We Were	1974		
"I've Never Been in Love Before"	Barbra Streisand	Frank Loesser	Back to Broadway	1993		
"If a Girl Isn't Pretty"	Barbra Streisand	Bob Merrill; Jule Styne	Funny Girl	1968		
"If I Close My Eyes"	Barbra Streisand	Alan Bergman; Marilyn Bergman; Billy Goldenberg	Just for the Record...	1972 (Note: Recorded for the film Up the Sandbox.)	1991	
"If I Close My Eyes"	Barbra Streisand	Alan Bergman; Marilyn Bergman; Billy Goldenberg	Non-album single	1972	1973	
"If I Could"	Barbra Streisand	Ken Hirsch; Ron Miller; Marti Sharron	Higher Ground	1997		
"If I Didn't Love You"	Barbra Streisand	Bruce Roberts; Junior Miles	A Love Like Ours	1999		
"If I Love Again"	Barbra Streisand	Jack Murray; Ben Oakland	Funny Lady	1975		
"If I Loved You"	Barbra Streisand	Oscar Hammerstein II; Richard Rodgers	The Broadway Album	1985		
"If I Never Met You"	Barbra Streisand	Tom Snow; Dean Pitchford	A Love Like Ours	1999		
"If It's Meant to Be"	Barbra Streisand	Brian Byrne; Alan Bergman; Marilyn Bergman	Release Me	2011	2012	
"If Only You Were Mine"	Barbra Streisand and Barry Gibb	Barry Gibb; Ashley Gibb; Stephen Gibb	Release Me 2	2005	2021	
"If You Could Read My Mind"	Barbra Streisand	Gordon Lightfoot	Stoney End	1971		
"If You Ever Leave Me"	Barbra Streisand and Vince Gill	Richard Marx	A Love Like Ours	1999		
"If You Go Away (Ne me quitte pas)" (Note: "If You Go Away (Ne me quitte pas)" is an English cover of "Ne me quitte pas", originally performed by Jacques Brel.)	Barbra Streisand	Jacques Brel; Rod McKuen	Love Is the Answer	2009		
"If You Were the Only Boy in the World"	Barbra Streisand	Nat Ayer; Clifford Grey	My Name Is Barbra	1965		
"Imagine" / "What a Wonderful World"	Barbra Streisand	John Lennon; Yoko Ono; Bob Thiele; George David Weiss	Walls	2018		
"In the Wee Small Hours of the Morning"	Barbra Streisand	Bob Hilliard; David Mann	Love Is the Answer	2009		
"In trutina"	Barbra Streisand	Carl Orff	Classical Barbra	1973	1976	
"The Island" (Note: "The Island" is an English cover of "Começar de Novo", originally performed by Simone, with new lyrics written by Alan and Marilyn Bergman.)	Barbra Streisand	Ivan Lins; Vitor Martins; Alan Bergman; Marilyn Bergman	A Love Like Ours	1999		
"Isn't It a Pity?"	Barbra Streisand	George Gershwin; Ira Gershwin	A Love Like Ours	1999		
"Isn't This Better"	Barbra Streisand	Fred Ebb; John Kander	Funny Lady	1975		
"It Had to Be You"	Barbra Streisand	Isham Jones; Gus Kahn	The Third Album	1964		
"It Had to Be You"	Barbra Streisand and Michael Bublé	Isham Jones; Gus Kahn	Partners	2014		
"It Must Be You"	Barbra Streisand	Steve Dorff; Stephony Smith	A Love Like Ours	1999		
"It Must Have Been the Mistletoe"	Barbra Streisand	Douglas Konecky; Justin Wilde	Christmas Memories	2001		
"It Takes A Woman (Reprise)"	Barbra Streisand	Jerry Herman	Hello, Dolly!	1969		
"It's a New World" (Live)	Barbra Streisand	Harold Arlen; Ira Gershwin	One Voice	1986	1987	
"(It's Gonna Be A) Great Day"	Barbra Streisand	Edward Eliscu; Billy Rose; Vincent Youmans	Funny Lady	1975		
"It's Only a Paper Moon" / "I Like Him" (Note: "It's Only a Paper Moon" is a cover, while "I Like Him" is an original song written by Fred Ebb and John Kander.)	Barbra Streisand	Harold Arlen; E.Y. "Yip" Harburg; Billy Rose; Fred Ebb; John Kander	Funny Lady	1975		
"It's Up to You"	Barbra Streisand	Ashley Gibb; Barry Gibb	Guilty Pleasures	2005		
"Jenny Rebecca"	Barbra Streisand	Carol Hall	My Name Is Barbra	1965		
"Jingle Bells?"	Barbra Streisand	James Lord Pierpont; Jack Gold; Marty Paich	A Christmas Album	1967		
"Johnny One Note" / "One Note Samba"	Barbra Streisand	Lorenz Hart; Richard Rodgers; A.C. Jobim; Newton Mendonça; Jon Hendricks	Barbra Streisand...and Other Musical Instruments	1973		
"Jubilation"	Barbra Streisand	Paul Anka; Johnny Harris	ButterFly	1974		
"Just a Little Lovin' (Early in the Mornin')"	Barbra Streisand	Barry Mann; Cynthia Weil	Stoney End	1971		
"Just in Time"	Barbra Streisand	Betty Comden; Adolph Green; Jule Styne	The Third Album	1964		
"Just Leave Everything To Me"	Barbra Streisand	Jerry Herman	Hello, Dolly!	1969		
"Just One Lifetime"	Barbra Streisand	Tom Snow; Melissa Manchester	A Love Like Ours	1999		
"Keepin' Out of Mischief Now" (Live)	Barbra Streisand	Andy Razaf; Thomas Waller	Just for the Record...	1962	1991	
"Keepin' Out of Mischief Now"	Barbra Streisand	Andy Razaf; Thomas Waller	The Barbra Streisand Album	1963		
"A Kid Again" / "I'm Five"	Barbra Streisand	Johnny Melfi; Roger Perry; Milton Schafer	My Name Is Barbra	1965		
"The Kind of Man a Woman Needs"	Barbra Streisand	Michael Leonard; Herbert Martin	My Name Is Barbra, Two...	1965		
"Kiss Me in the Rain"	Barbra Streisand	Sandy Farina; Lisa Ratner	Wet	1979		
"Lady Liberty"	Barbra Streisand	Desmond Child	Walls	2018		
"Lascia ch'io pianga"	Barbra Streisand	George Frideric Handel	Classical Barbra	1973	1976	
"Lazy Afternoon"	Barbra Streisand	John La Touche; Jerome Moross	Lazy Afternoon	1975		
"Le Mur"	Barbra Streisand	Charles Dumont; Michel Vaucaire	Je m'appelle Barbra	1966		
"Leading with Your Heart"	Barbra Streisand	Alan Bergman; Marilyn Bergman; Marvin Hamlisch	Higher Ground	1997		
"Left in the Dark"	Barbra Streisand	Jim Steinman	Emotion	1984		
"Les enfants qui pleurent"	Barbra Streisand	Michel Legrand	Barbra Streisand En Français	1966		
"Lessons to Be Learned"	Barbra Streisand	Dorothy Sea Gazeley; Marsha Malamet; Alan Rich	Higher Ground	1997		
"Let Me Go"	Barbra Streisand	Randy Newman	Stoney End	1971		
"Let the Good Times Roll"	Barbra Streisand	Leonard Lee	ButterFly	1974		
"Let's Hear It for Me"	Barbra Streisand	Fred Ebb; John Kander	Funny Lady	1975		
"Letter to My 13 Year Old Self"	Barbra Streisand and Laufey	Laufey; Spencer Stewart	The Secret of Life: Partners, Volume Two	2025		
"Letters That Cross in the Mail"	Barbra Streisand	Rupert Holmes	Lazy Afternoon	1975		
"Letting Go"	Barbra Streisand	George Bitzer; Barry Gibb	Guilty Pleasures	2005		
"Lied: Auf Dem Wasser Zu Singen"	Barbra Streisand	Franz Schubert	Barbra Streisand...and Other Musical Instruments	1973		
"Life on Mars"	Barbra Streisand	David Bowie	ButterFly	1974		
"Life Story"	Barbra Streisand	Barry Gibb; Robin Gibb	Guilty	1980		
"Like a Straw in the Wind"	Barbra Streisand	Harold Arlen	The Second Barbra Streisand Album	1963		
"Little Tin Soldier"	Barbra Streisand	Jimmy Webb	What About Today?	1969		
"Living Without You"	Barbra Streisand	Randy Newman	Release Me 2	1971	2021	
"The Lord's Prayer"	Barbra Streisand	Albert Hay Malotte	A Christmas Album	1967		
"Losing My Mind"	Barbra Streisand	Stephen Sondheim	Encore: Movie Partners Sing Broadway (deluxe edition)	2016		
"Lost in Wonderland" (Note: "Lost in Wonderland" is an English cover of "Antigua", originally performed by Antônio Carlos Jobim.)	Barbra Streisand	Antônio Carlos Jobim; Marshall Barer	Release Me	1968	2012	
"Lost Inside of You"	Barbra Streisand and Kris Kristofferson	Barbra Streisand; Leon Russell	A Star Is Born	1976		
"Lost Inside of You"	Barbra Streisand	Barbra Streisand; Leon Russell	Memories	1976 (Note: Recorded for A Star Is Born.)	1981	
"Lost Inside of You"	Barbra Streisand and Babyface	Barbra Streisand; Leon Russell	Partners (deluxe edition)	2014		
"Love"	Barbra Streisand	John Lennon	Barbra Joan Streisand	1971		
"Love and Learn" (Note: "Love and Learn" is an English cover of "Qui es-tu ?", originally performed by Michel Legrand.)	Barbra Streisand	Norman Gimbel; Michel Legrand; Eddy Marnay	Je m'appelle Barbra	1966		
"Love Breakdown"	Barbra Streisand	Alan Gordon	Songbird	1978		
"Love Comes from Unexpected Places"	Barbra Streisand	Kim Carnes; Dave Ellingson	Superman	1977		
"Love Dance"	Barbra Streisand	Ivan Lins; Gilson Peranzzetta; Paul Williams	Love Is the Answer	2009		
"Love in the Afternoon"	Barbra Streisand	Richard Germinaro; Evie Sands; Ben Weisman	ButterFly	1974		
"The Love Inside"	Barbra Streisand	Barry Gibb	Guilty	1980		
"Love Is a Bore"	Barbra Streisand	Sammy Cahn; Jimmy Van Heusen	People	1964		
"Love Is Like a New Born Child" (Live)	Barbra Streisand	Oscar Brown Jr.	A Happening in Central Park	1967	1968	
"Love Is Only Love"	Barbra Streisand	Jerry Herman	Hello, Dolly!	1969		
"Love Light"	Barbra Streisand	Burt Bacharach; Carole Bayer Sager	Till I Loved You	1988		
"Love Like Ours"	Barbra Streisand	Dave Grusin; Alan Bergman; Marilyn Bergman	A Love Like Ours	1999		
"Love Me Tender"	Barbra Streisand and Elvis Presley	Vera Matson; Elvis Presley	Partners	2014		
"Love Will Survive"	Barbra Streisand	Walter Afanasieff; Charlie Midnight; Kara Talve; Hans Zimmer	Non-album single	2024		
"Love Will Survive"	Barbra Streisand and Seal	Walter Afanasieff; Charlie Midnight; Kara Talve; Hans Zimmer	The Secret of Life: Partners, Volume Two	2025		
"Love with All the Trimmings"	Barbra Streisand	Burton Lane; Alan Jay Lerner	On a Clear Day You Can See Forever	1970		
"Love's Never Wrong"	Barbra Streisand	Steve Dorff; Marty Panzer; Jay Landers	Walls	2018		
"Lover, Come Back to Me" (Live)	Barbra Streisand	Oscar Hammerstein II; Sigmund Romberg	Just for the Record...	1962	1991	
"Lover, Come Back to Me"	Barbra Streisand	Oscar Hammerstein II; Sigmund Romberg	The Second Barbra Streisand Album	1963		
"Lover Man (Oh, Where Can You Be?)"	Barbra Streisand	Jimmy Davis; Roger Ramirez; James Sherman	Simply Streisand	1967		
"Loving You"	Barbra Streisand and Patrick Wilson	Stephen Sondheim	Encore: Movie Partners Sing Broadway	2016		
"Luck Be a Lady"	Barbra Streisand	Frank Loesser	Back to Broadway	1993		
"Lullaby for Myself"	Barbra Streisand	Rupert Holmes	Superman	1977		
"Ma première chanson"	Barbra Streisand	Eddy Marnay; Barbra Streisand	Je m'appelle Barbra	1966		
"The Main Event/Fight"	Barbra Streisand	Paul Jabara; Bruce Roberts	The Main Event (Note: The Main Event also included an alternative, short version of "The Main Event/Fight".)	1979		
"The Main Event/Fight (Ballad)"	Barbra Streisand	Paul Jabara; Bruce Roberts	The Main Event	1979		
"Make Believe"	Barbra Streisand	Oscar Hammerstein II; Jerome Kern	The Third Album	1964		
"Make It Like a Memory"	Barbra Streisand	Barry Gibb; Albhy Galuten	Guilty	1980		
"Make No Mistake, He's Mine"	Barbra Streisand and Kim Carnes	Kim Carnes	Emotion	1984		
"Make Our Garden Grow" (Live)	Barbra Streisand	Leonard Bernstein; Richard Wilbur	Back to Brooklyn	2012	2013	
"Make Someone Happy"	Barbra Streisand	Betty Comden; Adolph Green; Jule Styne	Love Is the Answer	2009		
"Make the Man Love Me"	Barbra Streisand	Dorothy Fields; Arthur Schwartz	Simply Streisand	1967		
"The Man I Love"	Barbra Streisand	Ira Gershwin; George Gershwin	Back to Broadway	1993		
"A Man I Loved"	Barbra Streisand	Nikki Oosterveen; George Michalski	Songbird	1978		
"The Man That Got Away" (Live)	Barbra Streisand	Harold Arlen; Ira Gershwin	The Concert	1994		
"Martina" (Note: "Martina" is an English cover of "Les enfants qui pleurent", originally performed by Michel Legrand.)	Barbra Streisand	Michel Legrand; Hal Shaper	Je m'appelle Barbra	1966		
"Maybe"	Barbra Streisand	Harry Nilsson	Stoney End	1971		
Medley (Live): 1. "Hooray For Love"; 2. "After You've Gone"; 3. "By Myself"; 4. "'S Wonderful"; 5. "How About You?"; 6. "Lover, Come Back to Me"; 7. "You and the Night and the Music"; 8. "It All Depends On You"	Judy Garland and Barbra Streisand	Harold Arlen; Leo Robin; Henry Creamer; Turner Layton; Arthur Schwartz; Howard Dietz; George Gershwin; Ira Gershwin; Burton Lane; Ralph Freed; Sigmund Romberg; Oscar Hammerstein II; Ray Henderson; B.G. DeSylva; Lew Brown	Just for the Record...	1963	1991	
Medley (Live): 1. "Marty the Martian"; 2. "The Sound of Music"; 3. "Mississippi Mud"; 4. "Santa Claus Is Coming to Town"	Barbra Streisand	Jeffrey D. Harris; Richard Rodgers; Oscar Hammerstein II; Harry Barris; James Cavanaugh; J. Fred Coots; Haven Gillespie	A Happening in Central Park	1967	1968	
Medley (Live): 1. "Second Hand Rose"; 2. "Give Me the Simple Life"; 3. "I Got Plenty of Nothin'"; 4. "Brother, Can You Spare a Dime?"; 5. "Nobody Knows You When You're Down and Out"; 6. "Second Hand Rose"; 7. "The Best Things in Life Are Free"	Barbra Streisand	Grant Clarke; James F. Hanley; Harry Ruby; Rube Bloom; Ira Gershwin; DuBose Heyward; George Gershwin; Yip Harburg; Jay Gorney; Jimmy Cox; Buddy DeSylva; L. Russell Brown; Ray Henderson	My Name Is Barbra, Two...	1965		
Medley (Live): 1. "Animal Crackers in My Soup"; 2. "Funny Face"; 3. "That Face"; 4. "They Didn't Believe Me"; 5. "Were Thine That Special Face"; 6. "I've Grown Accustomed to Her Face"; 7. "Let's Face the Music and Dance"; 8. "Sam, You Made the Pants Too Long"; 9. "What's New Pussycat?"; 10. "Small World"; 11. "I Love You"; 12. "I Stayed Too Long at the Fair"; 13. "Look at That Face"	Barbra Streisand	Irving Caesar; Ray Henderson; Ted Koehler; George Gershwin; Ira Gershwin; Alan Bergman; Lew Spence; Jerome Kern; Herbert Reynolds; Cole Porter; Frederick Loewe; Alan Jay Lerner; Irving Berlin; Sam M. Lewis; Victor Young; Fred Whitehouse; Burt Bacharach; Hal David; Jule Styne; Stephen Sondheim; Billy Barnes; Leslie Bricusse; Anthony Newley	Color Me Barbra	1966		
"Memory"	Barbra Streisand	Andrew Lloyd Webber; T. S. Eliot; Trevor Nunn	Memories	1981		
"The Minute Waltz"	Barbra Streisand	Lan O'Kun; Frédéric Chopin	Color Me Barbra	1966		
"Miss Marmelstein"	Barbra Streisand	Harold Rome	I Can Get It for You Wholesale	1962		
"Moanin' Low"	Barbra Streisand	Howard Dietz; Ralph Rainger	Lazy Afternoon	1975		
"Moon River" (Live)	Barbra Streisand	Henry Mancini; Johnny Mercer	Just for the Record...	1962 (Note: Performed on the PM East.)	1991	
"Moon River"	Barbra Streisand	Henry Mancini; Johnny Mercer	The Movie Album	2003		
"Mondnacht"	Barbra Streisand	Robert Schumann	Classical Barbra	1973	1976	
"The Moon and I" (demo)	Barbra Streisand	Alan Bergman; Marilyn Bergman; Michel Legrand	Just for the Record... (Note: The demo version of "The Moon and I" was also included on the 40th Anniversary Deluxe Edition of Yentl in 2023.)	1983 (Note: Recorded for Yentl.)	1991	
"More in Love with You" (Note: "More in Love with You", originally an instrumental song, includes new lyrics written by Alan and Marilyn Bergman.)	Barbra Streisand	Alan Bergman; Marilyn Bergman; André Previn	The Movie Album	2003		
"More Than You Know"	Barbra Streisand	Edward Eliscu; Billy Rose; Vincent Youmans	Simply Streisand	1967		
"More Than You Know"	Barbra Streisand	Edward Eliscu; Billy Rose; Vincent Youmans	Funny Lady	1975		
"The Morning After"	Barbra Streisand	Richard Maltby, Jr. David Shire	What About Today?	1969		
"The Morning After"	Barbra Streisand and George Segal	Buck Henry	The Owl and the Pussycat	1970		
"Mother"	Barbra Streisand	John Lennon	Barbra Joan Streisand	1971		
"Mother and Child"	Barbra Streisand	Michel Legrand; Alan Bergman; Marilyn Bergman	Release Me	1973	2012	
"Move On"	Barbra Streisand	Stephen Sondheim	Back to Broadway	1993		
"Much More" (Live)	Barbra Streisand	Tom Jones; Harvey Schmidt	Live at the Bon Soir	1962	2022	
"Much More"	Barbra Streisand	Tom Jones; Harvey Schmidt	The Barbra Streisand Album	1963		
"The Music of the Night"	Barbra Streisand and Michael Crawford	Andrew Lloyd Webber; Charles Hart; Richard Stilgoe	Back to Broadway	1993		
"The Music That Makes Me Dance"	Barbra Streisand	Bob Merrill; Jule Styne	Funny Girl (Original Broadway Cast Recording)	1964		
"The Music That Makes Me Dance"	Barbra Streisand	Bob Merrill; Jule Styne	A Love Like Ours	1999		
"My Buddy" / "How About Me"	Barbra Streisand	Gus Kahn; Walter Donaldson; Irving Berlin	The Way We Were	1974		
"My Coloring Book"	Barbra Streisand	Fred Ebb; John Kander	The Second Barbra Streisand Album	1963		
"My Father's Song"	Barbra Streisand	Rupert Holmes	Lazy Afternoon	1975		
"My Favorite Things"	Barbra Streisand	Oscar Hammerstein II; Richard Rodgers	A Christmas Album	1967		
"My Funny Valentine"	Barbra Streisand	Lorenz Hart; Richard Rodgers	Simply Streisand	1967		
"My Heart Belongs to Me"	Barbra Streisand	Alan Gordon	Superman	1977		
"My Honey's Lovin' Arms" (Live)	Barbra Streisand	Joseph Meyer; Harry Ruby	Live at the Bon Soir	1962	2022	
"My Honey's Lovin' Arms"	Barbra Streisand	Joseph Meyer; Harry Ruby	The Barbra Streisand Album	1963		
"My Lord and Master"	Barbra Streisand	Oscar Hammerstein II; Richard Rodgers	People	1964		
"My Man" (Note: "My Man" is an English cover of "Mon Homme".)	Barbra Streisand	Jacques Charles; Channing Pollock; Albert Willemetz; Maurice Yvain	My Name Is Barbra	1965		
"My Man"	Barbra Streisand	Jacques Charles; Channing Pollock; Albert Willemetz; Maurice Yvain	Funny Girl	1968		
"My Melancholy Baby"	Barbra Streisand	Ernie Burnett; George A. Norton; Maybelle E. Watson	The Third Album	1964		
"My Name Is Barbara" (Live)	Barbra Streisand	Leonard Bernstein	Live at the Bon Soir	1962	2022	
"My Name Is Barbara"	Barbra Streisand	Leonard Bernstein	My Name Is Barbra	1965		
"My Pa"	Barbra Streisand	Michael Leonard; Herbert Martin	My Name Is Barbra	1965		
"My Shining Hour" (Live)	Barbra Streisand	Harold Arlen; Johnny Mercer	Live in Concert 2006	2006	2007	
"My Valentine"	Barbra Streisand and Paul McCartney	Paul McCartney	The Secret of Life: Partners, Volume Two	2025		
"Napoleon" (Live)	Barbra Streisand	Harold Arlen; E.Y. Harburg	Live at the Bon Soir	1962	2022	
"Natural Sounds" (Live)	Barbra Streisand	Lan O'Kun	A Happening in Central Park	1967	1968	
"The Nearness of You"	Barbra Streisand	Hoagy Carmichael; Ned Washington	Simply Streisand	1967		
"Never Give Up"	Barbra Streisand	Barry Gibb; Albhy Galuten	Guilty	1980		
"Never Will I Marry" (Live)	Barbra Streisand	Frank Loesser	Live at the Bon Soir	1962	2022	
"Never Will I Marry"	Barbra Streisand	Frank Loesser	The Third Album	1964		
"New York State of Mind"	Barbra Streisand	Billy Joel	Superman	1977		
"New York State of Mind"	Barbra Streisand and Billy Joel	Billy Joel	Partners	2014		
"Niagara"	Barbra Streisand	Carole Bayer Sager; Marvin Hamlisch; Bruce Roberts	Wet	1979		
"Nice 'n' Easy"	Barbra Streisand	Alan Bergman; Marilyn Bergman; Lew Spence	What Matters Most	2011		
"Night of My Life"	Barbra Streisand	Ashley Gibb; Barry Gibb	Guilty Pleasures	2005		
"No Easy Way Down"	Barbra Streisand	Carole King; Gerry Goffin	Stoney End	1971		
"No Matter What Happens"	Barbra Streisand	Alan Bergman; Marilyn Bergman; Michel Legrand	Yentl	1983		
"No Matter What Happens" (studio version)	Barbra Streisand	Alan Bergman; Marilyn Bergman; Michel Legrand	Yentl	1983		
"No More Songs for Me"	Barbra Streisand	Richard Maltby, Jr. David Shire	My Name Is Barbra, Two...	1965		
"No More Tears (Enough Is Enough)"	Barbra Streisand and Donna Summer	Paul Jabara; Bruce Roberts	Wet (Note: "No More Tears (Enough Is Enough)" was recorded simultaneously for Streisand's album Wet and Donna Summer's album On the Radio: Greatest Hits Volumes I & II, which included its alternative version.)	1979		
"No Wonder"	Barbra Streisand	Alan Bergman; Marilyn Bergman; Michel Legrand	Yentl	1983		
"No Wonder (Part Two)"	Barbra Streisand	Alan Bergman; Marilyn Bergman; Michel Legrand	Yentl	1983		
"No Wonder (Reprise)"	Barbra Streisand	Alan Bergman; Marilyn Bergman; Michel Legrand	Yentl	1983		
"Nobody Makes a Pass at Me"	Barbra Streisand	Harold Rome	Pins and Needles	1962		
"Nobody's Heart (Belongs to Me)" (Live)	Barbra Streisand	Lorenz Hart; Richard Rodgers	Just for the Record...	1962	1991	
"Non c'est rien"	Barbra Streisand	Michel Jourdan; Armand Canfora	Color Me Barbra	1966		
"Not a Day Goes By"	Barbra Streisand	Stephen Sondheim	Encore: Movie Partners Sing Broadway (deluxe edition)	2016		
"Not Cricket to Picket"	Barbra Streisand	Harold Rome	Pins and Needles	1962		
"Not While I'm Around"	Barbra Streisand	Stephen Sondheim	The Broadway Album	1985		
"O Little Town of Bethlehem"	Barbra Streisand	Phillips Brooks; Lewis Redner; Jack Gold	A Christmas Album	1967		
"On a Clear Day (You Can See Forever) (Reprise)"	Barbra Streisand	Burton Lane; Alan Jay Lerner	On a Clear Day You Can See Forever	1970		
"On Holy Ground"	Barbra Streisand	Geron Davis	Higher Ground	1997		
"On My Way to You"	Barbra Streisand	Alan Bergman; Marilyn Bergman; Michel Legrand	Till I Loved You	1988		
"On Rainy Afternoons"	Barbra Streisand	Alan Bergman; Marilyn Bergman; Lalo Schifrin	Wet	1979		
"Once Upon a Dream" / "When You Wish Upon a Star" / "Someday My Prince Will Come" (Live)	Barbra Streisand	Sammy Fain; Jack Lawrence; Leigh Harline; Ned Washington; Larry Morey; Frank Churchill	The Concert	1994		
"Once Upon a Summertime" (Note: "Once Upon a Summertime" is an English cover of "La valse des lilas".)	Barbra Streisand	Eddie Barclay; Michel Legrand; Eddy Marnay; Johnny Mercer	Je m'appelle Barbra	1966		
"Once You've Been in Love"	Barbra Streisand	Michel Legrand; Alan Bergman; Marilyn Bergman	Release Me 2	1973	2021	
"One Day (A Prayer)"	Barbra Streisand	Michel Legrand; Alan Bergman; Marilyn Bergman	Release Me 2	1968	2021	
"One God"	Barbra Streisand	Ervin Drake; Jimmy Shirl	Christmas Memories	2001		
"One Heart, One Voice"	Barbra Streisand, Mariah Carey and Ariana Grande	Walter Afanasieff; Jay Landers; Charlie Midnight	The Secret of Life: Partners, Volume Two	2025		
"One Kiss"	Barbra Streisand	Oscar Hammerstein II; Sigmund Romberg	Color Me Barbra	1966		
"One Less Bell to Answer" / "A House Is Not a Home"	Barbra Streisand	Burt Bacharach; Hal David	Barbra Joan Streisand	1971		
"One More Night"	Barbra Streisand	Burt Bacharach; Carole Bayer Sager; Tom Keane	Songbird	1978		
"One More Time Around"	Barbra Streisand	Mark Radice	Till I Loved You	1988		
"Ordinary Miracles"	Barbra Streisand	Marvin Hamlisch; Alan Bergman; Marilyn Bergman	Non-album single	1994		
"Our Corner of the Night"	Barbra Streisand	George Goehring; Stanley Wayne Rhodes	Non-album single	1968		
"(Our Love) Don't Throw It All Away"	Barbra Streisand	Barry Gibb; Blue Weaver	Guilty Pleasures	2005		
"Over the Rainbow" (Live)	Barbra Streisand	Harold Arlen; Yip Harburg	One Voice	1986	1987	
"Papa, Can You Hear Me?"	Barbra Streisand	Alan Bergman; Marilyn Bergman; Michel Legrand	Yentl	1983		
"Pavane (Vocalise)"	Barbra Streisand	Gabriel Fauré	Classical Barbra	1973	1976	
"People"	Barbra Streisand	Bob Merrill; Jule Styne	Funny Girl (Original Broadway Cast Recording)	1964		
"People"	Barbra Streisand	Bob Merrill; Jule Styne	People	1964		
"People"	Barbra Streisand	Bob Merrill; Jule Styne	Funny Girl	1968		
"People"	Barbra Streisand	Bob Merrill; Jule Styne	Barbra Streisand...and Other Musical Instruments	1973		
"People"	Barbra Streisand and Stevie Wonder	Bob Merrill; Jule Styne	Partners	2014		
"Piano Practicing"	Barbra Streisand	Lan O'Kun	Barbra Streisand...and Other Musical Instruments	1973		
"A Piece of Sky"	Barbra Streisand	Alan Bergman; Marilyn Bergman; Michel Legrand	Yentl	1983		
"Pieces of Dreams"	Barbra Streisand	Alan Bergman; Marilyn Bergman; Michel Legrand	The Way We Were	1974		
"Places That Belong to You"	Barbra Streisand	James Newton Howard; Alan Bergman; Marilyn Bergman	The Prince of Tides	1991		
"The Places You Find Love"	Barbra Streisand	Glen Ballard; Clif Magness	Till I Loved You	1988		
"Pretty Women" / "The Ladies Who Lunch"	Barbra Streisand	Stephen Sondheim	The Broadway Album	1985		
"Prisoner" (Note: "Prisoner" is alternatively called "Prisoner (Love Theme from Eyes of Laura Mars)".)	Barbra Streisand	Karen Lawrence; John DeSautels	Eyes of Laura Mars	1978		
"Prisoner (Reprise)"	Barbra Streisand	Karen Lawrence; John DeSautels	Eyes of Laura Mars	1978		
"Promises"	Barbra Streisand	Barry Gibb; Robin Gibb	Guilty	1980		
"Punky's Dilemma"	Barbra Streisand	Paul Simon	What About Today?	1969		
"Pure Imagination"	Barbra Streisand and Seth MacFarlane	Leslie Bricusse; Anthony Newley	Encore: Movie Partners Sing Broadway	2016		
"Put On Your Sunday Clothes"	Michael Crawford and Barbra Streisand	Jerry Herman	Hello, Dolly!	1969		
"Putting It Together"	Barbra Streisand	Stephen Sondheim	The Broadway Album	1985		
"Queen Bee"	Barbra Streisand	Rupert Holmes	A Star Is Born	1976		
"Quiet Night"	Barbra Streisand	Lorenz Hart; Richard Rodgers	My Name Is Barbra, Two...	1965		
"A Quiet Thing" / "There Won't Be Trumpets"	Barbra Streisand	Fred Ebb; John Kander; Stephen Sondheim	Just for the Record...	1974	1991	
"The Rain Will Fall"	Barbra Streisand	Barbra Streisand; Jonas Myrin; Charlie Midnight; Jay Landers	Walls	2018		
"Rainbow Connection"	Barbra Streisand and Kermit the Frog (Note: Kermit the Frog voiced by Jim Henson.)	Paul Williams; Kenneth Ascher	Release Me 2	1979	2021	
"Rat-Tat-Tat-Tat"	Danny Meehan, Barbra Streisand and Funny Girl cast	Bob Merrill; Jule Styne	Funny Girl (Original Broadway Cast Recording)	1964		
"The Reunion"	Barbra Streisand and George Segal	Buck Henry	The Owl and the Pussycat	1970		
"Right as the Rain" (Live)	Barbra Streisand	Paul Williams; Kenneth Ascher	Live at the Bon Soir	1962	2022	
"Right as the Rain"	Barbra Streisand	Paul Williams; Kenneth Ascher	Release Me 2	1962	2021	
"Right as the Rain"	Barbra Streisand	Paul Williams; Kenneth Ascher	The Second Barbra Streisand Album	1963		
"Roller Skate Rag"	Barbra Streisand	Bob Merrill; Jule Styne	Funny Girl	1968		
"Rose's Turn" / "Some People" / "Don't Rain on My Parade" (Live)	Barbra Streisand	Stephen Sondheim; Jule Styne; Bob Merrill	Back to Brooklyn	2012	2013	
"Run Wild"	Barbra Streisand	Barry Gibb; Robin Gibb	Guilty	1980		
"Sadie, Sadie"	Barbra Streisand and Funny Girl cast	Bob Merrill; Jule Styne	Funny Girl (Original Broadway Cast Recording)	1964		
"Sadie, Sadie"	Barbra Streisand	Bob Merrill; Jule Styne	Funny Girl	1968		
"Sam, You Made the Pants Too Long"	Barbra Streisand	Sam M. Lewis; Victor Young; Fred Whitehouse	Non-album single	1966		
"The Same Hello, the Same Goodbye"	Barbra Streisand	Alan Bergman; Marilyn Bergman; John Williams	What Matters Most	2011		
"Second Hand Rose"	Barbra Streisand	Grant Clarke; James F. Hanley	My Name Is Barbra, Two...	1965		
"Second Hand Rose"	Barbra Streisand	Grant Clarke; James F. Hanley	Barbra Streisand...and Other Musical Instruments	1973		
"The Second Time Around"	Barbra Streisand	Jimmy Van Heusen; Sammy Cahn	The Movie Album	2003		
"Secret O' Life"	Barbra Streisand and James Taylor	James Taylor	The Secret of Life: Partners, Volume Two	2025		
"The Seduction"	Barbra Streisand and George Segal	Buck Henry	The Owl and the Pussycat	1970		
"Sempreverde" (Note: "Sempreverde" is an Italian version of "Evergreen".)	Barbra Streisand	Barbra Streisand; Paul Williams; Luigi Albertelli	Non-album single (Note: "Sempreverde" was released on an Italian version of "Evergreen".)	1977		
"Send In the Clowns"	Barbra Streisand	Stephen Sondheim	The Broadway Album	1985		
"Several Sins a Day" (demo)	Barbra Streisand	Alan Bergman; Marilyn Bergman; Michel Legrand	Yentl (40th Anniversary Deluxe Edition)	1983	2023	
"The Shadow of Your Smile"	Barbra Streisand	Johnny Mandel; Paul Francis Webster	My Name Is Barbra, Two...	1965		
"Shake Me, Wake Me (When It's Over)"	Barbra Streisand	Brian Holland; Lamont Dozier; Eddie Holland	Lazy Afternoon	1975		
"Simple Man"	Barbra Streisand	Graham Nash	ButterFly	1974		
"Simple Pleasures" (Live)	Barbra Streisand	Marvin Hamlisch; Alan Bergman; Marilyn Bergman	Timeless: Live in Concert	2000		
"Since I Don't Have You"	Barbra Streisand	Lenny Martin; Joseph Rock; Jackie Taylor; James Beaumont; Janet Vogel; Wally Lester; Joe Verscharen	ButterFly	1974		
"Since I Fell for You"	Barbra Streisand	Buddy Johnson	Barbra Joan Streisand	1971		
"Sing" / "Happy Days Are Here Again" (Live)	Barbra Streisand	Joe Raposo; Milton Ager; Jack Yellen	Live Concert at the Forum	1972		
"Sing" / "Make Your Own Kind of Music" (Live)	Barbra Streisand	Joe Raposo; Barry Mann; Cynthia Weil	Live Concert at the Forum	1972		
"Sing" / "I've Got a Crush on You" (Live)	Barbra Streisand and Jason Gould	Joe Raposo; George Gershwin; Ira Gershwin	Timeless: Live in Concert	2000		
"The Singer"	Barbra Streisand	Walter Marks	Just for the Record...	1970	1991	
"Sleep in Heavenly Peace (Silent Night)"	Barbra Streisand	Franz Gruber; Josef Mohr	A Christmas Album	1966		
"A Sleepin' Bee" (Live)	Barbra Streisand	Mack Gordon; Harry Warren	Live at the Bon Soir	1962	2022	
"A Sleepin' Bee" (Live)	Barbra Streisand	Mack Gordon; Harry Warren	Just for the Record...	1962 (Note: Performed on The Jack Paar Show.)	1991	
"A Sleepin' Bee"	Barbra Streisand	Mack Gordon; Harry Warren	The Barbra Streisand Album	1963		
"Smile"	Barbra Streisand	Charlie Chaplin; John Turner; Geoffrey Parsons	The Movie Album	2003		
"Smile"	Tony Bennett and Barbra Streisand	Charlie Chaplin; John Turner; Geoffrey Parsons	Duets: An American Classic	2006		
"Smoke Gets in Your Eyes"	Barbra Streisand	Jerome Kern; Otto Harbach	Love Is the Answer	2009		
"Snowbound"	Barbra Streisand	Russell Faith; Clarence Kehner	Christmas Memories	2001		
"So Long Dearie"	Barbra Streisand	Jerry Herman	Hello, Dolly!	1969		
"So Long Honey Lamb"	Barbra Streisand and Ben Vereen	Fred Ebb; John Kander	Funny Lady	1975		
"So Many Stars"	Barbra Streisand	Alan Bergman; Marilyn Bergman; Sérgio Mendes	What Matters Most	2011		
"Solitary Moon"	Barbra Streisand	Alan Bergman; Marilyn Bergman; Johnny Mandel	What Matters Most	2011		
"Some Enchanted Evening"	Barbra Streisand	Oscar Hammerstein II; Richard Rodgers	Back to Broadway	1993		
"Some Good Things Never Last"	Barbra Streisand	Mark Radice	Till I Loved You	1988		
"Some Other Time"	Barbra Streisand	Leonard Bernstein; Betty Comden; Adolph Green	Love Is the Answer	2009		
"Someday My Prince Will Come"	Barbra Streisand	Larry Morey; Frank Churchill	Snow White and the Seven Dwarfs: Platinum Edition (Note: "Someday My Prince Will Come" was also included on The Essential Barbra Streisand (2002).)	2001		
"Someone That I Used to Love"	Barbra Streisand	Gerry Goffin; Michael Masser	A Collection: Greatest Hits...and More	1989		
"Someone to Watch Over Me"	Barbra Streisand	George Gershwin; Ira Gershwin	My Name Is Barbra	1965		
"Something New In My Life"	Barbra Streisand	Alan Bergman; Marilyn Bergman; Michel Legrand	What Matters Most	2011		
"Something So Right"	Barbra Streisand	Paul Simon	The Way We Were	1974		
"Something Wonderful" / "Being Alive" (Live)	Barbra Streisand	Richard Rodgers; Oscar Hammerstein II; Stephen Sondheim	Timeless: Live in Concert	2000		
"Something's Coming"	Barbra Streisand	Stephen Sondheim; Leonard Bernstein	The Broadway Album	1985		
"Somewhere"	Barbra Streisand	Stephen Sondheim; Leonard Bernstein	The Broadway Album	1985		
"Somewhere"	Jackie Evancho featuring Barbra Streisand	Stephen Sondheim; Leonard Bernstein	Dream with Me	2011		
"Somewhere"	Barbra Streisand and Josh Groban	Stephen Sondheim; Leonard Bernstein	Partners	2014		
"Songbird"	Barbra Streisand	Dave Wolfert; Stephen Nelson	Songbird	1978		
"Soon It's Gonna Rain" (Live)	Barbra Streisand	Tom Jones; Harvey Schmidt	Live at the Bon Soir	1962	2022	
"Soon It's Gonna Rain"	Barbra Streisand	Tom Jones; Harvey Schmidt	The Barbra Streisand Album	1963		
"Space Captain"	Barbra Streisand	Matthew Moore	Barbra Joan Streisand	1971		
"Speak Low"	Barbra Streisand	Ogden Nash; Kurt Weill	Back to Broadway	1993		
"Speak to Me of Love" (Note: "Speak to Me of Love" is an English cover of "Parlez-moi d'amour", originally performed by Lucienne Boyer.)	Barbra Streisand	Jean Lenoir; Bruce Sievier	Je m'appelle Barbra	1966		
"Splish Splash" (Note: "Splish Splash" is a cover with additional new lyrics written by Streisand.)	Barbra Streisand	Bobby Darin; Murray Kaufman; Barbra Streisand	Wet	1979		
"Spring Can Really Hang You Up the Most" (Live)	Barbra Streisand	Fran Landesman; Tommy Wolf	Just for the Record...	1963 (Note: Performed at The Tonight Show Starring Johnny Carson.)	1991	
"Spring Can Really Hang You Up the Most"	Barbra Streisand	Fran Landesman; Tommy Wolf	Love Is the Answer	2009		
"Starting Here, Starting Now"	Barbra Streisand	Richard Maltby, Jr. David Shire	Color Me Barbra	1966		
"Status Quo"	Barbra Streisand	Harold Rome	Pins and Needles	1962		
"Stay Away"	Barbra Streisand	Kim Carnes	Songbird	1978		
"Stoney End"	Barbra Streisand	Laura Nyro	Stoney End	1970		
"Stout-Hearted Men"	Barbra Streisand	Oscar Hammerstein II; Sigmund Romberg	Simply Streisand	1967		
"Stranger in a Strange Land"	Barbra Streisand	Ashley Gibb; Barry Gibb; Stephen Gibb	Guilty Pleasures	2005		
"The Summer Knows"	Barbra Streisand	Michel LeGrand; Marilyn Bergman; Alan Bergman	Barbra Joan Streisand	1971		
"Summer Me, Winter Me"	Barbra Streisand	Alan Bergman; Michel Legrand	The Way We Were	1970		
"Superman"	Barbra Streisand	Richie Snyder	Superman	1977		
"Supper Time"	Barbra Streisand	Irving Berlin	People	1964		
"The Swan"	Barbra Streisand	Bob Merrill; Jule Styne	Funny Girl	1968		
"Sweet Forgiveness"	Barbra Streisand	Walter Afanasieff; John Bettis	Release Me 2	1994	2021	
"Sweet Inspiration" / "Where You Lead" (Live)	Barbra Streisand	Dan Penn; Spooner Oldham; Carole King; Toni Stern	Live Concert at the Forum	1972		
"Sweet Zoo"	Barbra Streisand	Jeffrey D. Harris	My Name Is Barbra	1965		
"The Sweetest Sounds" (Live)	Barbra Streisand featuring Richard Rodgers	Richard Rodgers	Just for the Record...	1969	1991	
"The Sweetest Sounds"	Barbra Streisand	Richard Rodgers	Barbra Streisand...and Other Musical Instruments	1973		
"Take Care of This House"	Barbra Streisand	Leonard Bernstein; Alan Jay Lerner; Jay Landers; David Pack	Walls	2018		
"Take Me to the World"	Barbra Streisand and Antonio Banderas	Stephen Sondheim	Encore: Movie Partners Sing Broadway	2016		
"Taking a Chance on Love"	Barbra Streisand	Vernon Duke; Ted Fetter; John Latouche	The Third Album	1964		
"A Taste of Honey" (Live)	Barbra Streisand	Ric Marlow; Bobby Scott	Live at the Bon Soir	1962	2022	
"A Taste of Honey"	Barbra Streisand	Ric Marlow; Bobby Scott	The Barbra Streisand Album	1963		
"Tell Him"	Barbra Streisand and Celine Dion	Walter Afanasieff; David Foster; Linda Thompson	Higher Ground (Note: "Tell Him" was recorded simultaneously for Streisand's album Higher Ground and Celine Dion's album Let's Talk About Love.)	1997		
"Tema de Amor de Nace Una Estrella" (Note: "Tema de Amor de Nace Una Estrella" is a Spanish version of "Evergreen".)	Barbra Streisand	Barbra Streisand; Paul Williams	Non-album single (Note: "Tema de Amor de Nace Una Estrella" was released on a version of "Evergreen" in Spanish-speaking countries. It was also included on the 2002 international reissue of A Star Is Born.)	1977		
"That Face"	Barbra Streisand	Alan Bergman; Lew Spence	What Matters Most	2011		
"That's a Fine Kind O' Freedom"	Barbra Streisand	Harold Arlen; Martin Charnin	What About Today?	1969		
"(They Long to Be) Close to You" (Live)	Burt Bacharach and Barbra Streisand	Burt Bacharach; Hal David	Just for the Record...	1971 (Note: Performed on The Burt Bacharach Special.)	1991	
"This Is One of Those Moments"	Barbra Streisand	Alan Bergman; Marilyn Bergman; Michel Legrand	Yentl	1983		
"Till I Loved You"	Barbra Streisand and Don Johnson	Maury Yeston	Till I Loved You	1988		
"Time After Time" (Live)	Barbra Streisand featuring Jule Styne	Jule Styne; Sammy Cahn	Just for the Record...	1969	1991	
"Time and Love"	Barbra Streisand	Laura Nyro	Stoney End	1971		
"A Time for Love"	Barbra Streisand	Johnny Mandel; Paul Francis Webster	Love Is the Answer	2009		
"Time Machine"	Barbra Streisand	Maurice White; Martin George Page; Brian Fairweather	Emotion	1984		
"The Time of Your Life" (Live)	Barbra Streisand	William Saroyan	Live in Concert 2006	2006	2007	
"To Lose You Again"	Barbra Streisand and Sam Smith	Howard Lawrence; Jimmy Napes; Sam Smith	The Secret of Life: Partners, Volume Two	2025		
"Tomorrow"	Barbra Streisand	Charles Strouse; Martin Charnin	Songbird	1978		
"Tomorrow Night"	Barbra Streisand	Alan Bergman; Marilyn Bergman; Michel Legrand	Yentl	1983		
"Try to Win a Friend"	Barbra Streisand	Larry Gatlin	Release Me	1977	2012	
"Two People"	Barbra Streisand	Barbra Streisand; Alan Bergman; Marilyn Bergman	Till I Loved You	1988		
"Until It's Time for You to Go"	Barbra Streisand	Buffy Sainte-Marie	What About Today?	1969		
"Unusual Way" (Live)	Barbra Streisand	Maury Yeston	Live in Concert 2006	2006	2007	
"Value" (Live)	Barbra Streisand	Jeffrey D. Harris	Just for the Record...	1962	1991	
"Verschwiegene Liebe"	Barbra Streisand	Hugo Wolf	Classical Barbra	1973	1976	
"The Very Thought of You"	Barbra Streisand and Bob Dylan	Ray Noble	The Secret of Life: Partners, Volume Two	2025		
"Wait"	Barbra Streisand	Michel Legrand; Alan Bergman; Marilyn Bergman	A Love Like Ours	1999		
"Walls"	Barbra Streisand	Walter Afanasieff; Alan Bergman; Marilyn Bergman	Walls	2018		
"Warm All Over"	Barbra Streisand	Frank Loesser	Just for the Record...	1988	1991	
"The Warmup"	Barbra Streisand and George Segal	Buck Henry	The Owl and the Pussycat	1970		
"Watch Closely Now"	Barbra Streisand and Kris Kristofferson	Paul Williams; Kenny Ascher	A Star Is Born	1976		
"The Water Is Wide" / "Deep River"	Barbra Streisand	traditional	Higher Ground	1997		
"The Way He Makes Me Feel"	Barbra Streisand	Alan Bergman; Marilyn Bergman; Michel Legrand	Yentl	1983		
"The Way He Makes Me Feel" (studio version)	Barbra Streisand	Alan Bergman; Marilyn Bergman; Michel Legrand	Yentl	1983		
"The Way We Were"	Barbra Streisand	Alan Bergman; Marilyn Bergman; Marvin Hamlisch	The Way We Were: Original Soundtrack Recording	1974		
"The Way We Were"	Barbra Streisand	Alan Bergman; Marilyn Bergman; Marvin Hamlisch	The Way We Were	1974		
"The Way We Were"	Barbra Streisand and Lionel Richie	Alan Bergman; Marilyn Bergman; Marvin Hamlisch	Partners	2014		
"The Way We Were (Finale)"	Barbra Streisand	Alan Bergman; Marilyn Bergman; Marvin Hamlisch	The Way We Were: Original Soundtrack Recording	1974		
"The Way We Were" / "Through the Eyes of Love" (Live)	Barbra Streisand	Bob Merrill; Jule Styne; Carole Bayer Sager	Back to Brooklyn	2012	2013	
"The Way We Weren't" / "The Way We Were" (Live)	Barbra Streisand	Alan Bergman; Marilyn Bergman; Marvin Hamlisch	Just for the Record...	1980 (Note: Performed at the ACLU Tribute to Alan and Marilyn Bergman.)	1991	
"We Must Be Loving Right"	Barbra Streisand	Roger Brown; Clay Blaker	A Love Like Ours	1999		
"We're Not Makin' Love Anymore"	Barbra Streisand	Michael Bolton; Diane Warren	A Collection: Greatest Hits...and More	1989		
"We've Only Just Begun"	Barbra Streisand	Roger Nichols; Paul Williams	Just for the Record...	1971 (Note: Recorded for Barbra Joan Streisand.)	1991	
"Wet"	Barbra Streisand	Sue Sheridan; Barbra Streisand; David Wolfert	Wet	1979		
"What About Today?"	Barbra Streisand	David Shire; Richard Maltby, Jr.	What About Today?	1969		
"What Are They Doing to Us Now?"	Barbra Streisand	Harold Rome	I Can Get It for You Wholesale	1962		
"What Are You Doing New Year's Eve?"	Barbra Streisand	Frank Loesser	Christmas Memories	2001		
"What Are You Doing the Rest of Your Life?"	Barbra Streisand	Alan Bergman; Marilyn Bergman; Michel Legrand	The Way We Were	1969 (Note: "What Are You Doing the Rest of Your Life?" was released as a non-album single in 1969. In 1974 it was included on The Way We Were.)		
"What Are You Doing the Rest of Your Life?"	Barbra Streisand and Michel Legrand	Alan Bergman; Marilyn Bergman; Michel Legrand	Just for the Record...	1972	1991	
"What Did I Have That I Don't Have"	Barbra Streisand	Burton Lane; Alan Jay Lerner	On a Clear Day You Can See Forever	1970		
"What Good Is Love"	Barbra Streisand	Harold Rome	Pins and Needles	1962		
"What Kind of Fool"	Barbra Streisand and Barry Gibb	Barry Gibb; Albhy Galuten	Guilty	1980		
"What Kind of Fool"	Barbra Streisand and John Legend	Barry Gibb; Albhy Galuten	Partners	2014		
"What Matters Most"	Barbra Streisand	Alan Bergman; Marilyn Bergman; Dave Grusin	What Matters Most	2011		
"What Now My Love" (Note: "What Now My Love" is an English cover of "Et maintenant", originally performed by Gilbert Bécaud.)	Barbra Streisand	Gilbert Bécaud; Pierre Delanoë; Carl Sigman	Je m'appelle Barbra	1966		
"What the World Needs Now"	Barbra Streisand	Burt Bacharach; Hal David	Walls	2018		
"What Were We Thinking Of"	Barbra Streisand	Antonina Armato; Scott Cutler	Till I Loved You	1988		
"What'll I Do" / "My Funny Valentine" (Live)	Barbra Streisand and Chris Botti	Irving Berlin; Lorenz Hart; Richard Rodgers	Back to Brooklyn	2012	2013	
"What's on My Mind"	Barbra Streisand	Barbra Streisand; Carole Bayer Sager; Jonas Myrin; Jay Landers	Walls	2018		
"When I Dream"	Barbra Streisand	Kathy Wakefield; Richard Baskin	Emotion	1984		
"When in Rome (I Do as the Romans Do)"	Barbra Streisand	Cy Coleman; Carolyn Leigh	People	1964		
"When Sunny Gets Blue"	Barbra Streisand	Marvin Fisher; Jack Segal	Simply Streisand	1967		
"When the Lovin' Goes Out of the Lovin'"	Barbra Streisand	Richard Parker; Bobby Whiteside	Release Me 2 (Target edition)	1984	2021	
"When the Sun Comes Out" (Live)	Barbra Streisand	Harold Arlen; Ted Koehler	Live at the Bon Soir	1962	2022	
"When the Sun Comes Out" (Live)	Barbra Streisand	Harold Arlen; Ted Koehler	Just for the Record...	1963 (Note: Performed on The Ed Sullivan Show.)	1991	
"When the Sun Comes Out"	Barbra Streisand	Harold Arlen; Ted Koehler	The Second Barbra Streisand Album	1963		
"When You Gotta Go" / "In the Wee Small Hours of the Morning" (Live)	Barbra Streisand	Herbert Kretzmer; David Mann; Bob Hilliard	Just for the Record...	1969 (Note: Performed at the International Hotel.)	1991	
"When You Wish Upon a Star"	Mary J. Blige featuring Barbra Streisand and Chris Botti	Leigh Harline; Ned Washington	A Mary Christmas	2013		
"Where's That Rainbow"	Barbra Streisand	Lorenz Hart; Richard Rodgers	My Name Is Barbra, Two...	1965		
"Where Am I Going?"	Barbra Streisand	Dorothy Fields; Cy Coleman	Color Me Barbra	1966		
"Where Do I Go From You?"	Barbra Streisand and Josh Groban	Desmond Child; Davitt Sigerson	The Secret of Life: Partners, Volume Two	2025		
"Where Do You Start?"	Barbra Streisand	Johnny Mandel; Alan Bergman; Marilyn Bergman	Love Is the Answer	2009		
"Where Is It Written?"	Barbra Streisand	Alan Bergman; Marilyn Bergman; Michel Legrand	Yentl	1983		
"Where Is the Wonder"	Barbra Streisand	Michael Barr; Dion McGregor	My Name Is Barbra	1965		
"Where or When"	Barbra Streisand	Lorenz Hart; Richard Rodgers	Color Me Barbra	1966		
"Where You Lead"	Barbra Streisand	Carole King; Toni Stern	Barbra Joan Streisand	1971		
"Why Did I Choose You?"	Barbra Streisand	Michael Leonard; Herbert Martin	My Name Is Barbra	1965		
"White Christmas"	Barbra Streisand	Irving Berlin	A Christmas Album	1967		
"Who Are You Now?"	Barbra Streisand	Bob Merrill; Jule Styne	Funny Girl (Original Broadway Cast Recording)	1964		
"Who Can I Turn To (When Nobody Needs Me)"	Barbra Streisand and Anthony Newley	Leslie Bricusse; Anthony Newley	Encore: Movie Partners Sing Broadway	2016		
"Who Will Buy?"	Barbra Streisand	Lionel Bart	The Second Barbra Streisand Album	1963		
"Who's Afraid of the Big Bad Wolf?" (Live)	Barbra Streisand	Frank Churchill; Ann Ronell	Just for the Record...	1962	1991	
"Who's Afraid of the Big Bad Wolf?"	Barbra Streisand	Frank Churchill; Ann Ronell	The Barbra Streisand Album	1963		
"Why Let It Go"	Barbra Streisand	Alan Bergman; Marilyn Bergman; Alan Hawkshaw; Barry Mason	Till I Loved You	1988		
"Widescreen"	Barbra Streisand	Rupert Holmes	Lazy Afternoon	1975		
"Wild Is the Wind"	Barbra Streisand	Dimitri Tiomkin; Ned Washington	The Movie Album	2003		
"Will He Like Me?"	Barbra Streisand	Jerry Bock; Sheldon Harnick	People	1964		
"Will Someone Ever Look at Me That Way?"	Barbra Streisand	Alan Bergman; Marilyn Bergman; Michel Legrand	Yentl	1983		
"Willow Weep for Me"	Barbra Streisand	Ann Ronell	Release Me	1967	2012	
"The Windmills of Your Mind"	Barbra Streisand	Alan Bergman; Marilyn Bergman; Michel Legrand	What Matters Most	2011		
"With a Little Help from My Friends"	Barbra Streisand	John Lennon; Paul McCartney	What About Today?	1969		
"With One Look"	Barbra Streisand	Don Black; Christopher Hampton; Andrew Lloyd Webber	Back to Broadway	1993		
"With One More Look at You" / "Watch Closely Now"	Barbra Streisand and Kris Kristofferson	Paul Williams; Kenny Ascher	A Star Is Born	1976		
"With One More Look at You" (studio version)	Barbra Streisand	Paul Williams; Kenny Ascher	Release Me	1977	2012	
"Without Your Love"	Barbra Streisand	Ashley Gibb; Barry Gibb	Guilty Pleasures	2005		
"Woman in Love"	Barbra Streisand	Barry Gibb; Robin Gibb	Guilty	1980		
"The Woman in the Moon"	Barbra Streisand	Paul Williams; Kenny Ascher	A Star Is Born	1976		
"The World Is a Concerto" / "Make Your Own Kind of Music" (Note: "The World Is a Concerto" is an original song written by Ken Welch and Mitzie Welch, while "Make Your Own Kind of Music" is a cover.)	Barbra Streisand	Ken Welch; Mitzie Welch; Barry Mann; Cynthia Weil	Barbra Streisand...and Other Musical Instruments	1973		
"Yesterdays"	Barbra Streisand	Otto Harbach; Jerome Kern	Color Me Barbra	1966		
"You and I"	Barbra Streisand	Stevie Wonder	Lazy Afternoon	1975		
"You and Me for Always"	Barbra Streisand	Burt Bacharach; Carole Bayer Sager	Till I Loved You	1988		
"You Are Woman, I Am Man"	Sydney Chaplin and Barbra Streisand	Bob Merrill; Jule Styne	Funny Girl (Original Broadway Cast Recording)	1964		
"You Are Woman, I Am Man"	Barbra Streisand and Omar Sharif	Bob Merrill; Jule Styne	Funny Girl	1968		
"You Don't Bring Me Flowers"	Barbra Streisand	Neil Diamond; Alan Bergman; Marilyn Bergman	Songbird	1978		
"You Don't Bring Me Flowers"	Barbra Streisand and Neil Diamond	Neil Diamond; Alan Bergman; Marilyn Bergman	Barbra Streisand's Greatest Hits Volume 2	1978		
"You Light Up My Life"	Barbra Streisand	Carole King	Release Me 2	1974	2021	
"You Must Believe in Spring"	Barbra Streisand	Alan Bergman; Marilyn Bergman; Michel Legrand	Love Is the Answer	2009		
"You Wanna Bet"	Barbra Streisand	Dorothy Fields; Cy Coleman	B-side to "Where Am I Going?" (Note: "You Wanna Bet" was also included on Just for the Record... (1991).)	1966		
"You'll Never Know"	Barbra Streisand	Mack Gordon; Harry Warren	Just for the Record...	1955	1991	
"You'll Never Know"	Barbra Streisand	Mack Gordon; Harry Warren	Just for the Record...	1988	1991	
"You'll Never Walk Alone"	Barbra Streisand	Richard Rodgers; Oscar Hammerstein II	The Essential Barbra Streisand	2002		
"You're a Step in the Right Direction"	Barbra Streisand	Barbra Streisand; John Mellencamp	Emotion	1984		
"You're Gonna Hear from Me"	Barbra Streisand	André Previn; Dory Previn	The Movie Album	2003		
"You're the Top"	Barbra Streisand and Ryan O'Neal	Cole Porter	Just for the Record...	1972 (Note: Recorded for the film What's Up, Doc?.)	1991	
"You've Got a Friend"	Barbra Streisand	Carole King	Barbra Joan Streisand	1971		
