= Diana Ross & the Supremes Sing and Perform "Funny Girl" =

Studio album by Diana Ross & the Supremes
- Released: August 26, 1968
- Recorded: 1968
- Genre: Pop; show tunes; R&B
- Label: Motown
- Producer: Berry Gordy; Gil Askey

Diana Ross & the Supremes chronology
| Live at London's Talk of the Town (1968) | Diana Ross & the Supremes Sing and Perform "Funny Girl" (1968) | Diana Ross & the Supremes Join The Temptations (1968) |

Professional ratings
Review scores
| Source | Rating |
|---|---|
| Record Mirror | 5/5 stars |

Diana Ross & the Supremes Sing and Perform "Funny Girl" is the thirteenth studio album released by Diana Ross & the Supremes on the Motown label, released in 1968. Berry Gordy had Diana Ross & the Supremes cover the songs from Barbra Streisand's Broadway musical Funny Girl original cast LP to tie-in with the September release of the feature-film version of the musical, also starring Streisand. The LP was not a success, and, with a Billboard 200 peak of 150, ranks as the lowest-charting of the Diana Ross-led Supremes albums.

== Track listing ==
All tracks written by Jule Styne and Bob Merrill. All tracks produced by Berry Gordy and Gil Askey.

Side One

1. "Funny Girl"
2. "If a Girl Isn't Pretty"
3. "I Am Woman"
4. "The Music That Makes Me Dance"
5. "Don't Rain on My Parade"

Side Two

1. "People"
2. "Cornet Man"
3. "His Love Makes Me Beautiful"
4. "Sadie, Sadie"
5. "I'm the Greatest Star"

== Personnel ==
- Diana Ross – lead vocals
- Mary Wilson – background vocals
- Cindy Birdsong – background vocals
- The Andantes – background vocals
- Various LA session singers – background vocals
- Gil Askey – arranger

== Charts ==
| Chart (1968) | Peak position |
|---|---|
| US Billboard 200 | 150 |
| US Top R&B/Hip-Hop Albums (Billboard) | 45 |
