= Release Me (Barbra Streisand album) =

Compilation album by Barbra Streisand
- Released: September 25, 2012
- Recorded: 1967–2011
- Genre: Vocal pop
- Length: 41:45
- Labels: Legacy; Columbia
- Producers: Barbra Streisand; Jack Gold; Wally Gold; Gary Klein; Jay Landers; Peter Matz; Richard Perry; Howard A. Roberts

Barbra Streisand chronology
| What Matters Most (2011) | Release Me (2012) | The Classic Christmas Album (2013) |

Professional ratings
Review scores
| Source | Rating |
|---|---|
| AllMusic | 4.5/5 stars |
| The Boston Globe | Favorable |
| Daily News | 3/5 stars |
| Entertainment Weekly | A− |
| The Independent | Favorable |

Release Me is a 2012 compilation album of eleven rare and previously unreleased studio performances by American singer Barbra Streisand.

The companion compilation Release Me 2 followed in 2021.

== Overview ==
Streisand announced the album's release on her official website in August 2012. It contains tracks recorded between her 1967 Simply Streisand and 2011 What Matters Most albums, gathering unreleased material from, among others, Stoney End, The Broadway Album, and Back to Broadway. The compilation's release was accompanied by a series of short video clips posted onto YouTube, in which Barbra discussed every track. A music video for "I Think It's Going to Rain Today" was directed, photographed and edited by Matt Amato.

The album debuted at number 7 on the Billboard 200 albums sales chart (with approximately 40,000 copies sold), making this her 32nd Top 10 album and her 6th consecutive Top 10 effort since The Movie Album in 2003.

== Track listing ==
1. "Being Good Isn't Good Enough" (From Hallelujah, Baby!) – 3:30 (Intended for The Broadway Album)
2. "Didn't We" – 2:36 (Intended for aborted album The Singer in 1970)
3. "Willow Weep for Me" – 3:31 (Intended for Simply Streisand)
4. "Try to Win a Friend" – 4:07 (Intended for Streisand Superman)
5. "I Think It's Going to Rain Today" – 3:27 (Intended for Stoney End)
6. "With One More Look at You" (From A Star Is Born) – 3:39 (Unreleased studio take)
7. "Lost in Wonderland" – 3:33 (Recorded during What About Today? sessions)
8. "How Are Things in Glocca Morra?"/"Heather on the Hill" (From Finian's Rainbow/Brigadoon) – 4:34 (Intended for unreleased version of Back to Broadway)
9. "Mother and Child" – 5:03 (Intended for aborted album Life Cycle of a Woman)
10. "If It's Meant to Be" – 4:08 (Intended for What Matters Most)
11. "Home" (From The Wiz) – 3:37 (Intended for The Broadway Album)

== Charts ==
| Chart (2012) | Peak position |
|---|---|
| Australian Albums (ARIA) | 114 |
| Belgian Albums (Ultratop Flanders) | 125 |
| Belgian Albums (Ultratop Wallonia) | 130 |
| Canadian Albums (Billboard) | 8 |
| French Albums (SNEP) | 138 |
| Hungarian Albums (MAHASZ) | 29 |
| Italian Albums (FIMI) | 83 |
| Dutch Albums (Album Top 100) | 37 |
| Scottish Albums (Official Charts) | 39 |
| Spanish Albums (Promusicae) | 33 |
| Swiss Albums (Schweizer Hitparade) | 78 |
| UK Albums (Official Charts) | 31 |
| US Billboard 200 | 7 |
