= Hello, Dolly! (soundtrack) =

Hello, Dolly

Soundtrack album by Barbra Streisand & various artists
- Released: October 1969
- Recorded: February 1968 – July 1969
- Genre: Classic pop
- Length: 50:28
- Label: 20th Century Fox Records

Barbra Streisand chronology
| What About Today? (1969) | Hello, Dolly (1969) | Barbra Streisand's Greatest Hits (1970) |

Singles from Hello, Dolly!
- 1. "Before the Parade Passes By" / "Love is Only Love" Released: December 1969; 2. "Hello, Dolly! (stereo") / "Hello, Dolly! (mono) (promotional)" Released: December 1969

Hello, Dolly! is the soundtrack album to the 1969 musical film of the same name, performed by Barbra Streisand, Walter Matthau, and Michael Crawford. Originally released on vinyl by 20th Century Fox Records, then reissued on Casablanca Records; the soundtrack was remastered for compact disc release by Philips Records in 1994. This album marked the second time Streisand recorded for a label other than Columbia (the previous instance being the Original Broadway Cast recording of Funny Girl five years earlier).

== Artwork ==
The poster on the album cover was created by Richard Amsel, a 22-year-old student winner of a nationwide contest to design the film.

== Critical reception ==
Professional ratings
Review scores
| Source | Rating |
|---|---|
| Allmusic | 4/5 stars |

Cashbox in their "Pop Picks" reviews noted that there's "no doubt about this album" as it was a "predestined hit". Retrospectively, William Ruhlmann of AllMusic stated that "Streisand's wild miscasting is less apparent on record than on film, however, and she sings effectively," but believed that "On the other hand, Walter Matthau can't sing."

== Track listing ==
All songs written by Jerry Herman

1. "Just Leave Everything To Me" (sung by Barbra Streisand) – 3:24
2. "It Takes A Woman" (sung by Walter Matthau) – 3:06
3. "It Takes A Woman (Reprise)" (sung by Barbra Streisand) – 2:16
4. "Put On Your Sunday Clothes" (sung by Company and Barbra Streisand and Michael Crawford) – 5:32
5. "Ribbons Down My Back" (sung by Melissa Stafford, dubbing for Marianne McAndrew) – 2:30
6. "Dancing" (sung by Barbra Streisand and Michael Crawford)" – 3:30
7. "Before The Parade Passes By" (sung by Barbra Streisand)" – 4:54
8. "Elegance" (sung by Company and Michael Crawford) – 3:07
9. "Love Is Only Love" (sung by Barbra Streisand) – 3:12
10. "Hello, Dolly!" (sung by Barbra Streisand and Louis Armstrong and ensemble) – 7:51
11. "It Only Takes A Moment" (sung by Michael Crawford) – 4:11
12. "So Long Dearie" (sung by Barbra Streisand) – 2:40
13. "Finale" (sung by Company, Walter Matthau, Michael Crawford and Barbra Streisand) – 4:19

== Chart positions ==
Chart peaks for Hello, Dolly!
| Chart (1970) | Peak position |
|---|---|
| US Billboard 200 | 49 |
| US Cashbox Top 100 Albums | 39 |
