= Release Me 2 =

Compilation album by Barbra Streisand
- Released: August 6, 2021
- Recorded: 1962–2014
- Genre: Vocal pop
- Length: 33:56
- Label: Legacy; Columbia
- Producer: Barbra Streisand; Burt Bacharach; Jochem van der Saag; Walter Afanasieff; Babyface; Don Costa; Mike Berniker; Barry Gibb; John Merchant; Michel Legrand; John Arias

Barbra Streisand chronology
Walls (2018)	Release Me 2 (2021)	Live at the Bon Soir (2022)

Singles from Release Me 2
- 1. "I'd Want It to Be You" Released: June 4, 2021; 2. "Rainbow Connection" Released: June 25, 2021; 3. "Sweet Forgiveness" Released: July 1, 2021; 4. "Be Aware" Released: August 6, 2021

Release Me 2 is a compilation album of ten rare and previously unreleased recordings by American singer Barbra Streisand. Released on CD, vinyl and digital formats on August 6, 2021, it is a follow-up to her 2012 compilation Release Me.

Sales of Release Me 2 extended Streisand's successful chart history in the U.S., making her the only woman with a top-20 album in each decade since the 1960s.

== Promotion ==
Release Me 2 was initially announced June 2, 2021, followed two days later by the lead single "I'd Want It to Be You", a duet with Willie Nelson. An official lyric video directed by Matt Amato accompanied the single's release.

In an interview, Barbra talked about the unique 1994 track "Sweet Forgiveness", released on July 1, "When I was planning my return to the concert stage in 1994 I asked Walter (Afanasieff) to produce a song called 'Ordinary Miracles' by Marvin Hamlisch and Alan and Marilyn Bergman and Walter said "If there's time to record a second song would you be interested in hearing something I wrote for you?' Then he sat down at the piano and played me this exquisite piece of music called 'Sweet Forgiveness.' 'Ordinary Miracles' took longer to record than we planned so we only had time to do one completed pass of 'Sweet Forgiveness' - meaning I recorded my one-take vocal, singing live with the orchestra. And now, I'm really happy to share it with you."

Then there was a second duet, which came out on June 25: "Rainbow Connection" with Kermit the Frog. On July 1, "Sweet Forgiveness" premiered in the U.K. on The Zoe Ball Breakfast Show, then subsequently released to digital platforms.

Zane Lowe joined Streisand at her home to discuss the album; their interview appeared August 4 on YouTube.

== Critical reception ==
BroadwayWorld said, "Streisand displays courage and openness in exploring deep feelings and truly taking them in. Her unforgettable voice tells a story with each lyric and leaves the listener with much to think about long after each song ends."

The Independent wrote, "Release Me 2 contains all the smarts and schmaltz of Babs at her best.... Streisand's voice is one of the most ridiculously luxurious instruments on the planet. A five-star penthouse suite of a voice: plush and spacious, with a solid-gold commitment to the lyrics and a sunken marble bathtub of soft-soapy soul in which to wallow."

Metro Weekly said, "Release Me 2 is a thoughtfully compiled album with a good spread of songs from various points in Streisand's career, hitting most of the beats that a longtime fan would expect to hear.... Apart from a couple of memorable novelties, Release Me 2 is classic Streisand from beginning to end."

== Commercial performance ==
The album debuted at #10 on the Rolling Stone Top 200 Albums Chart, selling 23,700 units (19.7k pure) in the United States and became the 3rd highest debut of the week. It also debuted at #15 on the Billboard 200 with 22,000 units sold and became the third top-selling album of the week (second by a female artist). Streisand also re-entered Billboard's Artist 100 at #15. On Billboard's Top Current Albums Sales, the album debuted at #2, while on Billboard's Vinyl Album Chart, the album debuted at #5.

Streisand now extends her record for the most top 40-charting albums among women in the history of the chart (54 albums). On top of that, she becomes the only woman with new top 20 – or even top 40 – albums in every decade from the 1960s through the 2020s.

In the United Kingdom, the album debuted at #5, becoming her 15th Top 10 album in the country. In its second week, the album fell to number fifteen and number ninety-five in its third week. The album performed moderately elsewhere, peaking inside the Top 20 including Germany, Australia and Switzerland.

== Track listing ==
Standard version
No.	Title	Writer(s)	Producer(s)	Length
1.	"Be Aware" (intended for the 1971 TV special Singer Presents Burt Bacharach)	Burt Bacharach; Hal David	Bacharach; Barbra Streisand	3:40
2.	"You Light Up My Life" (intended for ButterFly, 1974)	Carole King	Streisand; Jochem van der Saag	3:38
3.	"I'd Want It to Be You" (with Willie Nelson) (intended for Partners, 2014)	Steve Dorff; Jay Landers; Bobby Tomberlin	Walter Afanasieff; Babyface	4:02
4.	"Sweet Forgiveness" (recorded on April 7, 1994 at the Barbra Streisand Scoring Stage, Culver City)	Afanasieff; John Bettis	Streisand; Afanasieff	5:12
5.	"Living Without You" (intended for Stoney End, 1971)	Randy Newman	Streisand; Afanasieff	2:05
6.	"One Day (A Prayer)" (recorded in 1968, broadcast for the 1990 Earth Day Special)	Michel Legrand; Alan Bergman; Marilyn Bergman	Don Costa	3:06
7.	"Rainbow Connection" (with Kermit the Frog, performed by Jim Henson) (intended for Wet, 1979)	Paul Williams; Kenneth Ascher	Streisand; van der Saag	3:23
8.	"Right as the Rain" (from the musical Bloomer Girl, recorded in 1962)	Harold Arlen; E.Y. "Yip" Harburg	Mike Berniker	3:00
9.	"If Only You Were Mine" (with Barry Gibb) (intended for Guilty Pleasures, 2005)	Barry Gibb; Ashley Gibb; Stephen Gibb	B. Gibb; John Merchant	2:34
10.	"Once You've Been in Love" (recorded in 1973)	Legrand; A. Bergman; M. Bergman	Streisand; Legrand; John Arias	3:16
Total length:				33:56

Target exclusive bonus track
No.	Title	Writer(s)	Length
11.	"When the Lovin' Goes Out of the Lovin'" (intended for Emotion, 1984)	Richard Parker; Bobby Whiteside	3:44
Total length:			37:40

== Charts ==
Chart performance for Release Me 2
Chart (2021)	Peak position
Australian Albums (ARIA)	15
Austrian Albums (Ö3 Austria)	19
Belgian Albums (Ultratop Flanders)	34
Belgian Albums (Ultratop Wallonia)	77
Dutch Albums (Album Top 100)	32
German Albums (Offizielle Top 100)	19
Scottish Albums (OCC)	3
Spanish Albums (PROMUSICAE)	28
Swiss Albums (Schweizer Hitparade)	16
UK Albums (OCC)	5
US Billboard 200	15

== Release history ==
Release dates and formats
Region	Date	Format(s)	Edition(s)	Label	Ref.
Various	August 6, 2021	Digital download; streaming; CD; LP; cassette	Standard; Target exclusive	Columbia	
