= Funny Girl (Original Broadway Cast Recording) =

Cast recording by Barbra Streisand / various artists
- Released: April 1964
- Recorded: April 5, 1964
- Genre: Pop
- Length: 52:01
- Label: Capitol
- Producer: Dick Jones

Barbra Streisand chronology
| The Third Album (1964) | Funny Girl (Original Broadway Cast Recording) (1964) | People (1964) |

Singles from Funny Girl (Original Broadway Cast Recording)
- 1. "People" Released: January 1964

Professional ratings
Review scores
| Source | Rating |
|---|---|
| AllMusic | 4/5 stars |
| Record Mirror | 4/5 stars |

Funny Girl is the original Broadway cast recording of the musical of the same name, starring Barbra Streisand. The Funny Girl cast album peaked at No. 2 on the Billboard 200 in June 1964, selling 250,000 copies by the following month. The recording went on to beat Fiddler on the Roof and Hello, Dolly! to win the Grammy for Best Original Cast Show Album.

== Production ==
The Broadway show opened on March 26, 1964, at the Winter Garden Theater, and the cast album was recorded in a one-day session in early April, then released one week later by Capitol Records. Streisand performs twelve of the album's seventeen tracks, and the album marked the first time a Streisand recording was not released through Columbia. Streisand was already a successful singer at the time, with her prior three studio albums charting in the Billboard top 10.

== Track listing ==
All lyrics are written by Bob Merrill; all music is composed by Jule Styne.

Act One
| No. | Title | Performer(s) | Length |
|---|---|---|---|
| 1. | "Overture" | Orchestra | 4:03 |
| 2. | "If a Girl Isn't Pretty" | Jean Stapleton; Kay Medford; Danny Meehan; Original Broadway Cast of Funny Girl | 2:16 |
| 3. | "I'm the Greatest Star" | Barbra Streisand | 4:00 |
| 4. | "Cornet Man" (Trumpet soloist: Dick Perry) | Streisand | 3:52 |
| 5. | "Who Taught Her Everything?" | Medford; Meehan | 3:05 |
| 6. | "His Love Makes Me Beautiful" | John Lankston; Streisand; Cast | 3:20 |
| 7. | "I Want to Be Seen With You Tonight" | Sydney Chaplin; Streisand | 1:55 |
| 8. | "Henry Street" | Cast | 1:53 |
| 9. | "People" | Streisand | 3:25 |
| 10. | "You Are Woman, I Am Man" | Chaplin; Streisand | 3:48 |
| 11. | "Don't Rain on My Parade" | Streisand | 2:44 |
| Total length: | | | 34:21 |

Act Two
| No. | Title | Performer(s) | Length |
|---|---|---|---|
| 1. | "Sadie, Sadie" | Streisand; Cast | 3:32 |
| 2. | "Find Yourself a Man" | Meehan; Stapleton; Medford | 2:00 |
| 3. | "Rat-Tat-Tat-Tat" | Meehan; Streisand; Cast | 3:22 |
| 4. | "Who Are You Now?" | Streisand | 2:49 |
| 5. | "The Music That Makes Me Dance" | Streisand | 3:52 |
| 6. | "Don't Rain on My Parade (Reprise)" | Streisand | 2:05 |
| Total length: | | | 17:40 |

== Charts ==
=== Weekly charts ===
| Chart | Peak position |
|---|---|
| US Billboard 200 | 2 |

=== Year-end charts ===
| Chart (1964) | Position |
|---|---|
| US Cash Box | 14 |

== Certifications ==
| Region | Certification | Certified units/sales |
|---|---|---|
| United States (RIAA) | Gold | 500,000^{^} |
^{^} Shipments figures based on certification alone.

== See also ==
- Diana Ross & the Supremes Sing and Perform "Funny Girl", released on the Motown label in 1968
- Funny Girl soundtrack to the 1968 film adaptation
