= Parlez-moi d'amour (song) =

Song

"Parlez-moi d'amour" is a song written by Jean Lenoir in 1924 originally intended for Mistinguett. Lucienne Boyer was the first singer to record the song in 1930, and she made it very popular in France, America, and the rest of the world. An English translation was written by Bruce Sievier (1894, Paris – 1953) and is known as "Speak to Me of Love" or "Tell Me About Love".

It was also recorded by Dalida in 1961, and it features her 1961 album, Garde-moi la dernière danse.

Caterina Valente recorded it in 1960, but she sang it with a very special timbre.

== Film soundtracks ==
The song is sung by Constance Bennett on a film set in What Price Hollywood? (1932). It is heard in one of the early scenes of Casablanca (1942), played on Sam's piano when Ingrid Bergman first appears in Rick's Cafe. It also appears in One Way Passage (1932) as an orchestration on the soundtrack as a steward brings drinks to Frank McHugh and Aileen McMahon in their cabin. The song also appears as an instrumental played by Sean Penn's character Emmet Ray on guitar in Woody Allen's "Sweet and Lowdown" (1999).

"Speak to Me of Love" was recorded by Barbra Streisand on her 1966 "Je M'Appelle Barbra" LP, using both French and English lyrics.

A modern arrangement by Mark Isham is featured in the Alan Rudolph film, The Moderns (1988); it is sung by CharlElie Couture. The song is featured prominently in the 1998 American film The Impostors and in Woody Allen's Midnight in Paris (2011).

== Lyrics ==
{Refrain}

Parlez moi d'amour
Redites-moi des choses tendres
Votre beau discours
Mon coeur n'est pas las de l'entendre
Pourvu que toujours
Vous répétiez ces mots suprêmes:
Je vous aime

Vous savez bien
Que dans le fond je n'en crois rien
Mais cependant je veux encore
Ecouter ces mots que j'adore
Votre voix aux sons caressants
Qui les murmure en frémissant
Me berce de sa belle histoire
Et malgré moi je veux y croire

{Refrain}

Il est si doux
Mon cher trésor d'être un peu fou
La vie est parfois trop amère
Si l'on ne croit pas aux chimères
Le chagrin est vite apaisé
Et se console d'un baiser
Du Coeur on guerit la blessure
Par un serment qui le rassure

{Refrain}
