= Classical Barbra =

Studio album by Barbra Streisand
- Released: February 1976
- Recorded: April 6 – May 10, 1973
- Studios: TTG Studios (Hollywood, CA); RCA Recording Studios (Los Angeles, CA); Western Recorders (Hollywood, CA)
- Length: 30:08
- Label: CBS Masterworks original Columbia reissue
- Producer: Claus Ogerman

Barbra Streisand chronology
Lazy Afternoon (1975)	Classical Barbra (1976)	A Star Is Born (1976)

Classical Barbra is the eighteenth studio album by American singer Barbra Streisand, released in February 1976. It was recorded in 1973 and consists of songs by classical European composers and includes tracks sung in English, French, Occitan, German, Italian and Latin. The music is performed by the Columbia Symphony Orchestra, conducted by Claus Ogerman.

Leonard Bernstein wrote of the album, "Barbra Streisand's natural ability to make music takes her over to the classical field with extraordinary ease. It's clear that she loves these songs. In her sensitive, straightforward, and enormously appealing performance, she has given us a very special musical experience."

The album has been certified Gold in the United States for sales of 500,000 on May 5, 1999. In 2013 the album was remastered and 2 bonus tracks were added.

== Production ==
Barbra Streisand: The Music, the Woman, The Myth author Shaun Considine claimed that it took six months of secret editing to cut the album together.

Francesco Scavullo was paid $75,000 to take the photograph that adorns the cover of the Classical Barbra album.

This album saw Streisand be awarded her 40th gold album when it was certified in 1999.

Upon its rerelease, Streisand said: "I have always had a special affection for Classical Barbra. I loved the process of developing and making the recording, and I was gratified by the success it had when it was originally released".

== Critical reception ==
Professional ratings
Review scores
Source	Rating
AllMusic	3/5 stars
The Independent	3/5 stars
Rolling Stone	Mixed

The album received favorable reviews from music critics. The Washington Post explained that the album was "widely panned" upon its release, though notably it was defended by Glenn Gould. AllMusic gave the album a retrospective rating of 3 out of 5 stars, describing it as one of Streisand's "more esoteric projects" and a surprise to her fans. The Independent said that when the album was first released, it was a "rare and risky gambit". The Second Disk explained that the singer's "clarion voice and dramatic interpretive skills" ensured the album's timelessness. The New York Times said that the album was a "rare instance of [Streisand] being too deferential to the originals". The Baltimore Sun deemed it her "most daring album". The Tuscaloosa News compared Streisand's underwhelming performance of classical music to that of Florence Foster Jenkins. The Daily Gazette described it as an "ill-fated...proto-crossover album". Philippine Daily Inquirer said it was an "esoteric but laudable project", and one of the moments Streisand challenged herself with musical risks in her youth. The Village Voice compared its "hideous...camp" to that of Jane Olivor's performance of Donovan's Lalena. Beaver County Times deemed it a "pleasant surprise". Sarasota Herald Times said the album saw her "belting out arias". A Singer's Notebook thought Streisand's vocals sounded "repressed". Scotland on Sunday, in an article about the inappropriateness and limitations of many crossover albums, described Streisand's effort as a " decidedly dangerous liaison".

Classical pianist Glenn Gould wrote: "For me, the Streisand voice is one of the natural wonders of the age, an instrument of infinite diversity and timbral resource...Nothing in this album is insensitive or unmusical".

== Track listing ==
1. "Beau Soir" (Claude Debussy) – 2:42
2. "Brezairola - Berceuse" from 'Songs of the Auvergne' (Joseph Canteloube) – 3:47
3. "Verschwiegene Liebe" (Hugo Wolf) – 2:57
4. "Pavane (Vocalise)" (Gabriel Fauré) – 5:29
5. "Après un rêve" (Gabriel Fauré) – 3:24
6. "In trutina" from 'Carmina Burana' (Carl Orff) – 2:11
7. "Lascia ch'io pianga" from 'Rinaldo' (George Frideric Handel) – 3:37
8. "Mondnacht" (Robert Schumann) – 3:56
9. "Dank sei Dir, Herr" (Unconfirmed composer; Handel or Siegfried Ochs) – 3:42
10. "I Loved You" (Claus Ogerman) – 2:18

2013 Remaster Bonus Tracks

11. "An Sylvia, D.891" (Franz Schubert) – 2:50
12. "Auf dem Wasser zu singen, D.774" (Franz Schubert) – 3:14

== Charts ==
=== Weekly charts ===
Chart (1976)	Peak position
Canadian Albums (RPM)	87
US Billboard 200	46

== Certifications ==
Region	Certification	Certified units/sales
United States (RIAA)	Gold	500,000^{^}
^{^} Shipments figures based on certification alone.
