= I Hate Music (song cycle) =

Song cycle by Leonard Bernstein

- Song cycle by Leonard Bernstein
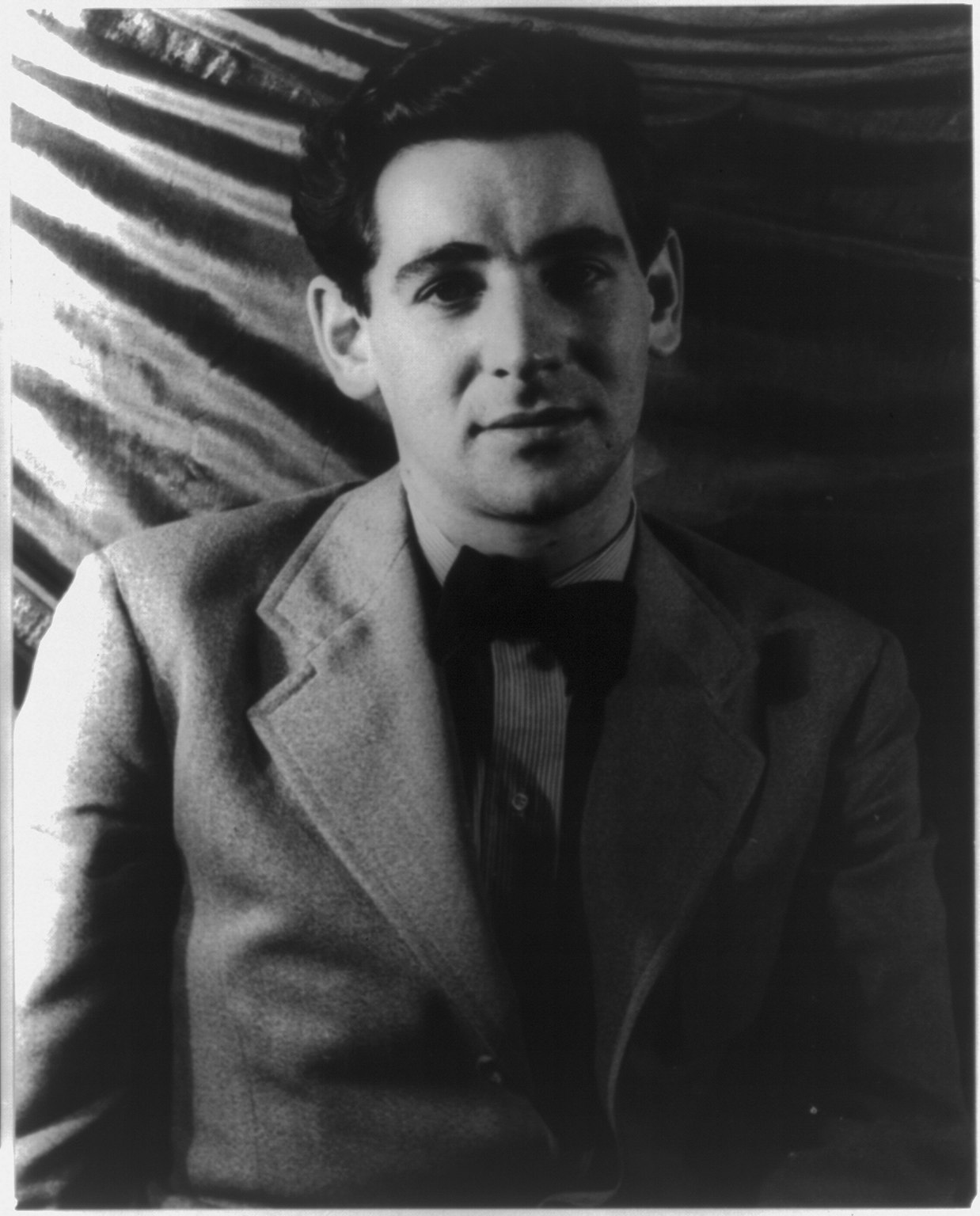
- The composer in 1944
- Text: Five kid songs by Bernstein
- Language: English
- Composed: 1942
- Dedication: Edys Merril
- Performed: August 24, 1943 Lenox Public Library in Lenox, Massachusetts
- Duration: 7 min.
- Scoring: soprano; piano

I Hate Music: A cycle of Five Kid Songs for Soprano and Piano is a song cycle by Leonard Bernstein. Composed in 1942, the work was premiered by vocalist Jennie Tourel with Bernstein as pianist in 1943. The song has remained a part of the song repertoire and has been recorded by numerous artists; including singers Blanche Thebom, Barbara Bonney, Harolyn Blackwell and Roberta Alexander among others.

== Composition and history ==
Leonard Bernstein composed the song cycle I Hate Music in the autumn of 1942, just prior to his composition of the ballet Fancy Free, the musical On the Town, and the Jeremiah Symphony. It is dedicated by Bernstein to his friend Edys Merril, who was his flatmate at the time of the composition. Merrill reputedly uttered the phrase "I hate music" due to her exasperation with Bernstein's constant piano playing and coaching of singers.

I Hate Music consists of five songs sung from the perspective of a ten-year old girl named Barbara. Written in a light-hearted and satirical style, the work has inflections of jazz idioms and at times has an improvised quality which reflects the spontaneity of a child's singing. The work is organized by mood and tempo into a 'palindrome structure' in which songs one ("My name is Barbara") and five ("I'm a person too") act as bookend pieces in which Barbara's personality is revealed through a slower more contemplative style; songs two ("Jupiter has seven moons") and four ("A big Indian and a little Indian") exhibit faster tempos with uneven meter; and the titular song, I Hate music!, lies at the center of these flanking songs.

In notes for the piece Bernstein writes that when performing the songs "...coyness is to be assiduously avoided. The natural, unforced sweetness of child expressions can never be successfully gilded; rather will it come through the music in proportion to the dignity and sophisticated understanding of the singer". A complete performance of the song cycle takes about 7 minutes.

I Hate Music received its premiere at the Lenox Public Library in Lenox, Massachusetts on 24 August 1943. Bernstein performed the piece at its premiere with the soprano Jennie Tourel. Bernstein and Tourel performed the piece again on 13 November 1943 at Tourel's New York City debut at The Town Hall. The critic Virgil Thomson described it as "witty, alive and adroitly fashioned" in the New York Herald Tribune.

In 1946 Metropolitan Opera mezzo-soprano Blanche Thebom programmed the work for recital performance in Kansas City, Missouri. She went on to record the work with Bernstein at the piano; a recording which was not released until decades later when Sony Classical included it on the 1997 album Leonard Bernstein The Early Years, Volume 4.

The title song opened Highbrow/Lowbrow: An American Sampler, a 1991 concert at Merkin Hall in Manhattan. New York magazine described it as "deftly summing up this country's long standing bifurcated attitude towards the arts in general: a desperate yearning for high culture on the one hand and a deep-rooted suspicion of it on the other".

The soprano Barbara Bonney performed I Hate Music at a 1994 recital at the Wigmore Hall in London. Musical Opinion described the piece as "irresistibly witty". Bonney included the piece on her 2005 Onyx Records album, My Name is Barbara. The album was named after the first song of I Hate Music. Several other artists have recorded the work including, Harolyn Blackwell (1996, in Blackwell Sings Bernstein, a Simple Song), Lyne Comtoi (1998, in Songs of the Americas), Judith Vindevogel (1997, in The Nursery), and Roberta Alexander (2014, in Leonard Bernstein Songs).

== Songs ==
1. "My Name Is Barbara"
2. "Jupiter Has Seven Moons"
3. "I Hate Music!"
4. "A Big Indian and a Little Indian"
5. "I'm a Person Too"
