= Funny Girl (soundtrack) =

Soundtrack album by Barbra Streisand
- Released: August 1968
- Genre: Classic pop
- Length: 46:55
- Label: Columbia
- Producer: Jack Gold

Barbra Streisand chronology
A Christmas Album (1967)	Funny Girl (1968)	A Happening in Central Park (1968)

Singles from Funny Girl
- 1. "Funny Girl / I'd Rather Be Blue Over You (Than Happy With Somebody Else)" Released: July 1968; 2. "My Man / Don't Rain On My Parade" Released: November 1968

Professional ratings
Review scores
Source	Rating
Allmusic	4/5 stars

Funny Girl is the soundtrack album to the 1968 musical film of the same name, performed by its star Barbra Streisand. Released on the vinyl album format in stereo in 1968, the soundtrack was subsequently released in quadraphonic sound vinyl, cassette, and compact disc. The titles "Second Hand Rose" and "Exit Music" are omitted from the commercially released soundtrack editions. The soundtrack is featured in "Billboard Greatest albums of all time" and National Public Radio's "The Greatest Albums Made By Women"

Record World called the title track "sad and lovely."

== Background and development ==
Lyricist Bob Merrill and composer Jule Styne originally wrote the score for the 1964 stage musical of the same name, including "I'm the Greatest Star", "People", and "Don't Rain on My Parade". These songs are more melodically and formally complex than usual Tin Pan Alley songs that were popular during that time. "People" uses the verse chorus structure commonly found in earlier showtunes.

== Track listing ==
All lyrics composed by Bob Merrill; all music by Jule Styne; except where indicated

1. "Overture" – [4:00]
2. "I'm the Greatest Star" – [4:06]
3. "If a Girl Isn't Pretty" – [2:26]
4. "Roller Skate Rag" – [2:01]
5. "I'd Rather Be Blue Over You (Than Be Happy With Somebody Else)" – [2:38] – (Billy Rose, Fred Fisher)
6. "His Love Makes Me Beautiful" – [5:39]
7. "People" – [5:01]
8. "You are Woman, I am Man" – [4:23]
9. "Don't Rain on My Parade" – [2:45]
10. "Sadie, Sadie" – [4:19]
11. "The Swan" – [2:51]
12. "Funny Girl" – [2:43]
13. "My Man" – [2:12] – (Albert Willemetz, Jacques-Charles (Jacques Mardochée Charles), Channing Pollock, Maurice Yvain)
14. "Finale" – [2:20]

== Charts ==
=== Weekly charts ===
Year	Chart	Position
1968	US Billboard 200	12
1968	UK Album Chart	11
1968	Australian Album Chart^{[A]}	4
1968	Canadian Album Chart	10

=== Year-end charts ===
Chart (1969)	Position
US Cash Box	10

== Certifications ==
Region	Certification	Certified units/sales
Canada (Music Canada)	Gold	50,000^{^}
United States (RIAA)	Platinum	1,000,000^{^}
^{^} Shipments figures based on certification alone.

== Notes ==
A. The Australian chart positions are from the Kent Music Report (KMR) / Australian Music Report (AMR) pre-1989 and from 1989 on from ARIA Charts.
