= Nuts (soundtrack) =

Soundtrack album by Barbra Streisand
- Released: December 21, 1987
- Recorded: 1984–1987
- Studio: Lorimar (Culver City, California)
- Length: 13:11
- Label: Columbia
- Producer: Barbra Streisand

Barbra Streisand chronology
One Voice (1987)	Nuts (1987)	Till I Loved You (1988)

Nuts is the soundtrack album to the 1987 American film of the same name. It was released by Columbia Records on December 21, 1987, and features five instrumental compositions by American singer Barbra Streisand. Nuts is the singer's first release since her live album One Voice, earlier in 1987, and her first soundtrack since Yentl (1983). She insisted on creating the film's score after acquiring the movie through her production company, Barwood Films.

The album contains four original songs written and produced by Streisand, in addition to "The Bar", which samples her collaboration with Richard Baskin titled "Here We Are at Last", originally included on her twenty-third studio album, Emotion (1984). Initial reviews for Nuts were negative, but Streisand claimed the criticism was on behalf of her role as a Renaissance woman, which she felt the world was not yet ready for. Modern reviews for the soundtrack were more positive.

== Background and songs ==
The American drama film Nuts was released by Warner Bros. Pictures on November 20, 1987, to theaters in the United States. Its accompanying soundtrack was released as an LP, cassette, and CD on December 21 of the same year through Columbia Records. Nuts was Streisand's first physical release since her third live album, One Voice, earlier in 1987, and her first soundtrack since Yentl (1983). The singer's production company, Barwood Films, acquired the production rights to Nuts in 1987, which enabled her to personally choose the film's score. At this same time, an outside writer had been commissioned to create music for Nuts, but Streisand refused and decided to compose the film's score by herself instead. The soundtrack was recorded at Lorimar Studios in Culver City, California and serves as the singer's "first attempt at film-music composition".

Nuts contains five instrumental compositions written and produced by Streisand, with the exception of "The Bar", which includes additional writing from Richard Baskin. All of the songs were recorded throughout 1987, excluding "The Bar", which was initially recorded in June 1984. Dan Wallin and Bob Fernandez served as recording engineers to the soundtrack, whereas Jeremy Lubbock arranged and conducted the score's four original compositions and Randy Waldman solely arranged and played on "The Bar". "The End Credits", the album's closing track, was featured on Streisand's fifth compilation album and first box set, Just for the Record..., in 1991. The version that appears on the record is titled "Theme" and is paired alongside Baskin's instrumental version of "The Bar", which contains an instrumental sample of Streisand's song "Here We Are at Last", taken from her twenty-third studio album, Emotion (1984).

== Reception ==
Initial reviews for the film's soundtrack were mostly negative, with them targeting the singer's role as a composer. Acknowledging the album's poor reception, Streisand reacted: "I don't get angry. I get hurt. It's a strange phenomenon that our society is not ready for a Renaissance woman. It is only ready for a Renaissance man." Contemporary reviews leaned towards being more positive; due to its short length, author Allison J. Waldman described the soundtrack as a "minimalist score" and "mini-CD soundtrack" in her 2001 biographical book The Barbra Streisand Scrapbook. Although she considered the score to be "subtle and slight," she concluded: "to [Streisand's] credit, it was an effective complement to the movie." Tom Santopietro, author of The Importance of Being Barbra: The Brilliant, Tumultuous Career of Barbra Streisand, wrote that "Here We Are at Last" was originally meant for Nuts rather than Emotion and praised it, calling it the "only song [that] registers at all" with Streisand at this point in her career.

== Track listing ==
All tracks produced by Streisand. On the cassette release of Nuts, "The Finale" and "The End Credits" are combined into one track, titled "The Finale / The End Credits", which has a duration of four minutes and 50 seconds. Due to the short length of the recording, all tracks are duplicated on both sides of the vinyl and cassette editions.

Nuts – Original Score from the Motion Picture – Standard edition
No.	Title	Writer(s)	Length
1.	"The Apartment"	Barbra Streisand	3:41
2.	"The Bar" (includes an instrumental sample of "Here We Are at Last")	Streisand; Richard Baskin	1:58
3.	"The Hospital"	Streisand	2:42
4.	"The Finale"	Streisand	1:08
5.	"The End Credits"	Streisand	3:42
Total length:			13:11

== Credits and personnel ==
Credits adapted from the liner notes of the original version of Nuts.

Recording

- Recorded and mastered at Lorimar Studios in Culver City, California

Personnel

- Barbra Streisand – writer, music
- Richard Baskin – writer (track 2)
- Bob Fernandez – recording engineer
- Jeremy Lubbock – arranger, conductor
- Randy Waldman – arranger, player (track 2)
- Dan Wallin – recording engineer
