= Je m'appelle Barbra =

Studio album by Barbra Streisand
- Released: October 1966
- Recorded: November 1965–October 1966
- Studio: Columbia 7th Ave, New York City; Columbia 30th Street, New York City
- Genre: Pop
- Length: 34:23
- Language: English, French
- Label: Columbia
- Producer: Ettore Stratta

Barbra Streisand chronology
Color Me Barbra (1966)	Je m'appelle Barbra (1966)	Simply Streisand (1967)

Singles from Je m'appelle Barbra
- 1. "Free Again" Released: September 1966

Je m'appelle Barbra (1966) is the eighth studio album released by American singer Barbra Streisand. She sings much of the album in French.

The album peaked at #5 on the Billboard 200, and was certified gold by the RIAA on April 24, 2002, almost 36 years after its original release. It was also Streisand's last album to make the Top 10 until 1971, when Stoney End reached #10.

Professional ratings
Review scores
Source	Rating
Allmusic	link

== Track listing ==
=== Side one ===
1. "Free Again" (Joss Baselli, Armand Canfora, Robert Colby, Michel Jourdan) – 3:43
2. "Autumn Leaves" (Joseph Kosma, Johnny Mercer, Jacques Prévert) – 2:50
3. "What Now My Love" (Gilbert Bécaud, Pierre Delanoë, Carl Sigman) – 2:41
4. "Ma première chanson" (Eddy Marnay, Barbra Streisand) – 2:19
5. "Clopin clopant" (Bruno Coquatrix, Pierre Dudan, Kermit Goell) – 3:10
6. "Le Mur" (Charles Dumont, Michel Vaucaire)– 2:34

=== Side two ===
1. "I Wish You Love" (Albert A. Beach, Léo Chauliac) – 3:01
2. "Speak to Me of Love" (Jean Lenoir, Bruce Sievier) – 2:52
3. "Love and Learn" (Norman Gimbel, Michel Legrand, Marnay) – 2:29
4. "Once Upon a Summertime" (Eddie Barclay, Legrand, Marnay, Mercer) – 3:37
5. "Martina" (Legrand, Hal Shaper) – 2:21
6. "I've Been Here" (Dumont, Earl Shuman, Vaucaire) – 2:31

== En Français EP ==
An EP was released in Europe in July 1966 called "Barbra Streisand En Français" with four French recordings:

1. "Non c'est rien" ('Free Again' - French version)
2. "Les enfants qui pleurent" ('Martina' - French version)
3. "Et la mer"
4. "Le Mur" ('I've Been Here' - French version)

== Single ==
1. "Free Again" / "I've Been Here" 1966

== Personnel ==
- Barbra Streisand – vocals
- Michel Legrand – arranger, conductor
- Ray Ellis – arranger, conductor (on "What Now My Love")
- Maurice Chevalier – liner notes
- Nat Shapiro – liner notes
- Richard Avedon – cover photographer

== Notes ==
Je m'appelle Barbra contains Streisand's first songwriting credit, for "Ma première chanson".

This album marks the first time Streisand collaborated with Michel Legrand, who arranged and conducted most of the album.

The album cover was photographed by Richard Avedon.

A song called "Look" was also recorded for this album, but was used as a b-side to the single: "Stout-Hearted Men" from Barbra's next album Simply Streisand (1967).

== Charts ==
Chart	Peak position
US Billboard 200	5
US Cashbox Top Albums	4

== Certifications ==
Region	Certification	Certified units/sales
United States (RIAA)	Gold	500,000^{^}
^{^} Shipments figures based on certification alone.
