= Simply Streisand =

Studio album by Barbra Streisand
- Released: October 1967
- Recorded: March 14, 15, 20, 1967
- Studio: Columbia 30th Street (New York City)
- Genre: Pop
- Length: 29:28
- Label: Columbia
- Producer: Jack Gold, Howard A. Roberts

Barbra Streisand chronology
Je m'appelle Barbra (1966)	Simply Streisand (1967)	A Christmas Album (1967)

Singles from Simply Streisand
- 1. "Stout-hearted Men" Released: July 1967; 2. "Lover Man (Oh, Where Can You Be?)" Released: November 1967

Simply Streisand (1967) is the ninth studio album released by American singer Barbra Streisand. The album was released simultaneously with A Christmas Album and was Streisand's first that failed to chart in the Top 10 of the Billboard 200 when it peaked at #12. Simply Streisand was recorded March 14, 15 and 20th, 1967. The album sold 250,000 in its first two weeks in the market. It was certified Gold by RIAA on April 24, 2002.

== Production ==
This was Streisand's first straight album — meaning songs in English, and without a TV special tie-in — since September 1964, when Columbia Records released People, even though "The Nearness of You" was played during the opening credits of Streisand's 1968 CBS-TV special, A Happening in Central Park, a year later. The liner notes for the LP were written by the composer Richard Rodgers: "No one is talented enough to sing with the depth of a fine cello or the lift of a climbing bird," he wrote. "Nobody, that is, except Barbra."

A song called "Look" (originally recorded for the previous album, Je m'appelle Barbra) was included as a b-side to the single: "Stout-Hearted Men". Streisand also recorded "Willow Weep for Me" and "Spring Can Really Hang You Up The Most" during these sessions. Both songs were not included in Simply Streisand. "Willow Weep For Me" was released in the fall of 2012.

== Reception ==
Professional ratings
Review scores
Source	Rating
Allmusic	3/5 stars

The album received mixed reviews from music critics. William Ruhlmann from AllMusic website gave the album three out of five stars and wrote that "If this were the only Streisand album you ever heard, you'd still think she was good. It's only in comparison to what went before that it seems mediocre." Stephen Holden of The New York Times later wrote that Simply Streisand was similar to The Third Album (1964), "but it lacked the freshness of its prototype."

According to Billboard magazine, Columbia Records reports a sale of nearly 250,000 in its first two weeks on the market.

== Track listing ==
=== Side one ===
1. "My Funny Valentine" (Lorenz Hart, Richard Rodgers) – 2:22
  - From Babes in Arms (1937)
2. "The Nearness of You" (Hoagy Carmichael, Ned Washington) – 3:27
3. "When Sunny Gets Blue" (Marvin Fisher, Jack Segal) – 2:56
4. "Make the Man Love Me" (Dorothy Fields, Arthur Schwartz) – 2:26
  - From A Tree Grows in Brooklyn (1951)
5. "Lover Man (Oh, Where Can You Be?)" (Jimmy Davis, Roger Ramirez, James Sherman) - 2.50

=== Side two ===
1. "More Than You Know" (Edward Eliscu, Billy Rose, Vincent Youmans) – 3:29
2. "I'll Know" (Frank Loesser) – 2:47
  - From Guys and Dolls (1950)
3. "All the Things You Are" (Oscar Hammerstein II, Jerome Kern) – 3:36
  - From Very Warm for May (1939)
4. "The Boy Next Door" (Ralph Blane, Hugh Martin) – 2:50
  - From Meet Me in St. Louis (1944)
5. "Stout-Hearted Men" (Hammerstein, Sigmund Romberg) – 2:43
  - From The New Moon (1928)

== Charts ==
Chart	Peak position
US Billboard 200	12
US Cashbox Top Albums	7

== Certifications ==
Region	Certification	Certified units/sales
United States (RIAA)	Gold	500,000^{^}
^{^} Shipments figures based on certification alone.

== Personnel ==
- Barbra Streisand – singer
- Ray Ellis – arranger
- David Shire – conductor
- Frank Laico – recording engineer
- Ray Gerhardt – recording engineer
- James Moore – photographer
- Richard Rodgers – liner notes
