= What About Today? =

Studio album by Barbra Streisand
- Released: July 1969
- Recorded: March 16, 1968; May 22, 1968; June 23, 1968; February 8, 1969; May 14 & 22, 1969
- Studios: Columbia Records (New York, NY): Hollywood, CA
- Genre: Pop
- Length: 34:22
- Label: Columbia
- Producer: Wally Gold

Barbra Streisand chronology
A Happening in Central Park (1968)	What About Today? (1969)	Hello, Dolly! (1969)

Singles from What About Today?
- 1. "The Morning After" / "Where Is the Wonder?" Released: April 1968; 2. "Frank Mills" / "Punky's Dilemma" Released: February 1969; 3. "Little Tin Soldier" / "Honey Pie" Released: July 1969

What About Today? is the eleventh studio album by Barbra Streisand. Released in July 1969, it is notable as her first recording of contemporary pop music, featuring songs by The Beatles and Paul Simon, among others.

Two singles were released to promote the album: "Frank Mills" (with "Punky's Dilemma" as a B-side) and "Little Tin Soldier" (with "Honey Pie" as the B-side), which managed to reach #35 on Billboard's Adult Contemporary music chart.

Columbia Records re-released the album in 1993, along with ten others newly available on compact disc. The album was not a commercial success, and became one of only three Streisand studio albums not to receive certification for record sales (the others being Barbra Streisand...and Other Musical Instruments and What Matters Most).

== Background and production ==
In the late 1960s, rock was the music style that dominated the charts in the United States and many other countries. Columbia Records, concerned about the drop in Streisand's record sales (which until 1966 had been earning gold records with all of her albums and selling nearly 1 million with each of them worldwide) had plans to make the artist's repertoire more contemporary. The agent of this change was Clive Davis, who was brought to the record company by Goddard Lieberson, and managed to bring a significant change in the record company's catalog of artists which was still closely linked to artists from the Great American Songbook, the canon of American music composed by artists from the 1920s to the 1950s who sing jazz standards, traditional pop and show tunes. Davis had helped the label hire artists such as Janis Joplin, Bruce Springsteen, Chicago, Kenny Loggins, and Pink Floyd, which turned out to be a great investment. Despite disagreeing with the idea, Streisand followed Davis' advice. In 1968, a single was released for the song "The Morning After", which featured as a B-side the song "Where is the Wonder" from her 1965 My Name Is Barbra album, but despite having a more contemporary sound, the single did not appear on the music charts.

The album was produced by Wally Gold, while Peter Matz conducted and arranged the songs: "Ask Yourself Why", "Honey Pie", "Punky's Dilemma", "That's a Fine Kind O' Freedom", "Little Tin Soldier" and "Goodnight". Don Costa arranged and conducted the tracks: "What About Today?" and "The Morning After". Michel Legrand was responsible for producing and conducting the orchestra on the songs "Until It's Time for You to Go", "With a Little Help from My Friends" and "Alfie", Legrand worked with the singer in many other albums. The photos from both cover and the back cover were taken by Richard Avedon, in 1968, one of the photos from the same shoot appeared in the March 1968 issue of Vogue. Four songs were recorded but not included in the final tracklisting "Chovendo na Roseira", by Tom Jobim, "Lost in Wonderland", "Tomorrow I Will Bring You a Rose" and "One Day" which was used in 1990s The Earth Day Special.

== Critical reception ==
Professional ratings
Review scores
Source	Rating
AllMusic	2/5 stars
Billboard	favorable
Robert Christgau	unfavorable

The album received mixed reviews from music critics.

William Ruhlmann, from AllMusic website gave the album two stars out of five and wrote that it is an unsuccessful attempt by Streisand because she didn't seem to understand contemporary music at the time. He also wrote that although Streisand was two years younger than newcomers like Paul Simon and John Lennon, on the record, she sings like she was their mother.

Writing for The New York Times, in October 1969, music critic Robert Christgau wrote an unfavorable review in which he stated that the singer was not suited to the music style chosen and that "not only is Streisand's emotion wasted on material so monotonous, as it is also shown as an arbitrary exercise".

Billboard wrote that the album tunes "were carefully selected" and shows Streisand "astonishing vocal capabilities" and also an honest message to the youth.

== Commercial performance ==
The album peaked at #31 on the Billboard 200 music chart and stayed there for seventeen weeks, making it the worst performance of an album by the singer at that time. In Canada, it peaked at #26 on April 10, 1969, on the RPM magazine chart.

== Track listing ==
=== Side one ===
1. "What About Today?" (David Shire, Richard Maltby, Jr.) – 2:57
2. "Ask Yourself Why" from the motion picture The Swimming Pool (Alan Bergman, Marilyn Bergman, Michel Legrand) – 3:03
3. "Honey Pie" (John Lennon, Paul McCartney) – 2:39
4. "Punky's Dilemma" (Paul Simon) – 3:29
5. "Until It's Time for You to Go" (Buffy Sainte-Marie) – 2:55
6. "That's a Fine Kind O' Freedom" (Harold Arlen, Martin Charnin) – 3:02

=== Side two ===
1. "Little Tin Soldier" (Jimmy Webb) –3:53
2. "With a Little Help from My Friends" (Lennon, McCartney) – 2:40
3. "Alfie" (Burt Bacharach, Hal David) – 3:20
4. "The Morning After" (Maltby, Shire) – 2:40
5. "Goodnight" (Lennon, McCartney) – 3:44

== Personnel ==
- Barbra Streisand – singer, liner notes
- Wally Gold – producer
- Michel Legrand – arranger, conductor on tracks 5, 8, 9
- Peter Matz – arranger, conductor on tracks 2–4, 6, 7, 11
- Don Costa – arranger, conductor on tracks 1, 10
- Don Meehan – recording engineer
- Richard Avedon – photographer

== Charts ==
Chart (1969)	Peak position
Canadian Albums (RPM)	26
US Billboard 200	31
US Cashbox Top Albums	30

== Release history ==
Region	Date	Format	Catalog
United States	July 1969	Vinyl	Columbia CS-9816
United States	July 1969	Cassette	Columbia 16 10 0658
United States	July 1969	8-track tape	Columbia 18 10 0658
Worldwide reissue	19 October 1993	CD	Columbia CK-47014
