= I'm the Greatest Star =

Song by Barbra Streisand

from the album Funny Girl
- Released: 1964
- Recorded: December 1963
- Genre: Show tune
- Length: 3:59
- Label: Capitol
- Composer(s): Jule Styne
- Lyricist(s): Bob Merrill
- Producer(s): Dick Jones

"I'm the Greatest Star" is a popular song from the 1964 musical Funny Girl. The show tune was composed by written by Jule Styne with lyrics by Bob Merrill. Barbra Streisand performed it in the role of Fanny Brice, first in the Broadway cast, then again in the 1968 film adaptation. The song was first included on the original Broadway cast recording album Funny Girl, which was a best-seller in 1964.

== Critical reception ==
A review in Talking' Broadway notes that Brice "comes out swingin' with 'I'm the Greatest Star.'" Howard Taubman wrote in The New York Times "Miss Streisand imagining herself in a radiant future in 'I'm the Greatest Star,' an appealingly quirky song, is not only Fanny Brice but all young performers believing in their destinies". Commenting on a 1991 performance by Pia Zadora in the lead role, Los Angeles Times critics noted "She has the requisite pluck for 'I'm the Greatest Star.'"
