= Alisa Efimova =

Finnish pair skater (born 1999)

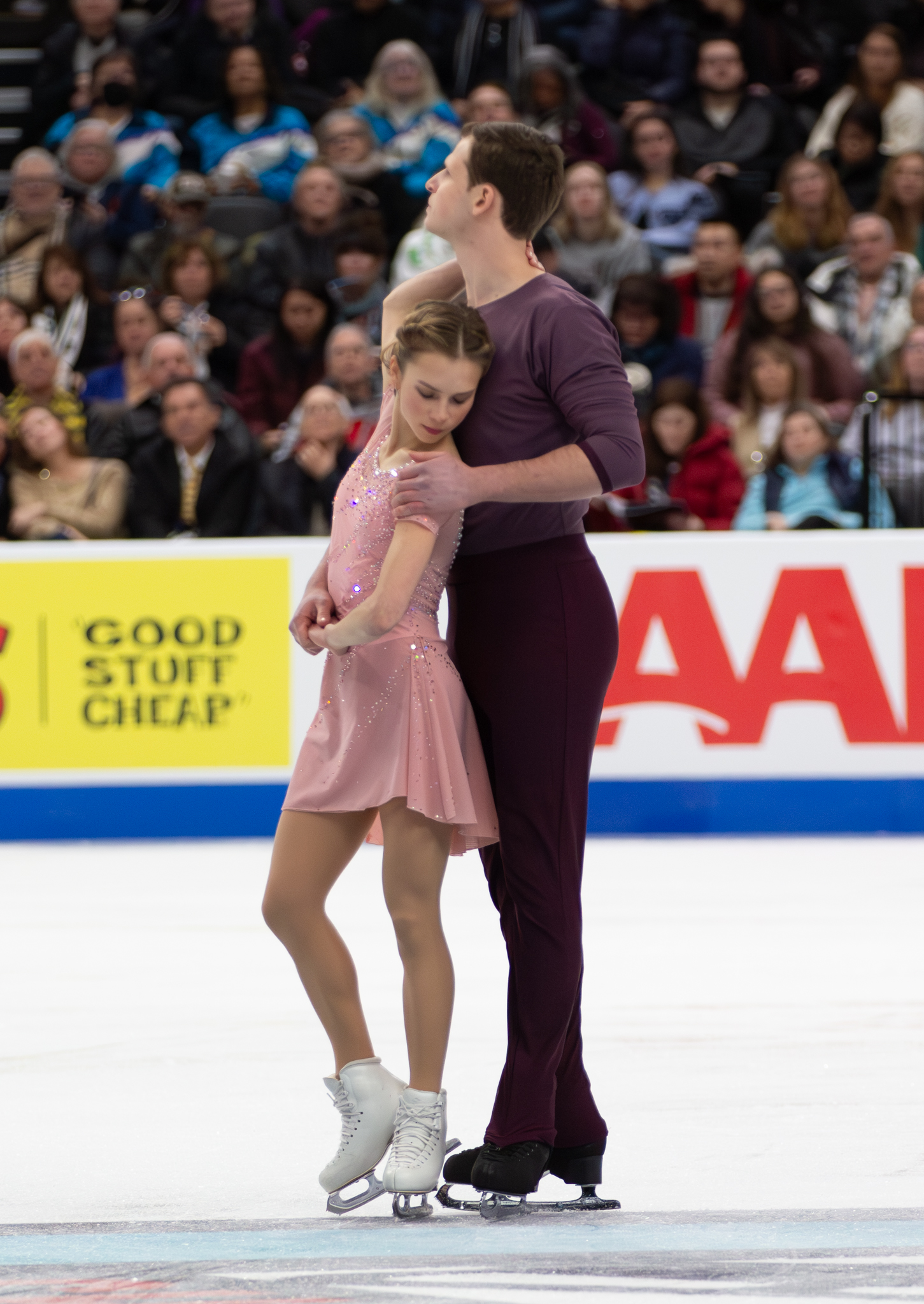
- Efimova and Mitrofanov at the 2026 U.S. Championships

Personal information
- Native name: Алиса Борисовна Ефимова
- Full name: Alisa Borisovna Efimova
- Born: 8 June 1999 (age 27) Kouvola, Finland
- Home town: Boston, Massachusetts, U.S.
- Height: 1.54 m (5 ft 1/2 in)

Figure skating career
- Country: United States (since 2023); Germany (2021–23); Russia (2015–20); Finland (2012–14)
- Discipline: Pair skating (since 2015); Women's singles (2012–14)
- Partner: Misha Mitrofanov (since 2023); Ruben Blommaert (2021–23); Alexander Korovin (2015–20)
- Coach: Olga Ganicheva; Alexei Letov
- Began skating: 2001

Medal record
Representing United States
Four Continents Championships
| Gold medal – first place | 2026 Beijing | Pairs |
U.S. Championships
| Gold medal – first place | 2025 Wichita | Pairs |
| Gold medal – first place | 2026 St. Louis | Pairs |
| Silver medal – second place | 2024 Columbus | Pairs |
World Team Trophy
| Gold medal – first place | 2025 Tokyo | Team |
Representing Germany
German Championships
| Silver medal – second place | 2022 Neuss | Pairs |

Alisa Borisovna Efimova (Russian: Алиса Борисовна Ефимова, born 8 June 1999) is a Finnish pair skater of Russian ancestry who competes for the United States. With her current partner and husband, Misha Mitrofanov, she is the 2026 Four Continents champion, a two-time U.S. national champion (2025–26), a four-time Grand Prix medalist, and a three-time Challenger Series medalist.

Competing for Germany with Ruben Blommaert, she is the 2022 Grand Prix of Espoo silver medalist, a two-time Challenger Series silver medalist, and the 2022 German national silver medalist.

Earlier in her career, she represented Russia with Alexander Korovin. The pair won one Grand Prix medal, silver at the 2018 Skate America, and six medals on the ISU Challenger Series, including gold at the 2018 CS Nebelhorn Trophy and 2018 CS Golden Spin of Zagreb.

== Personal life ==
Efimova was born in Kouvola, Finland. Her mother, Marina Shirshova, is a retired figure skater who currently works in Lappeenranta, Finland, while her father, Boris Efimov, is a physician. She also has a younger brother named Nikita.

Efimova is multilingual, able to communicate in Finnish, Russian, English and German fluently. Additionally, she has also studied French and Swedish. Efimova has expressed an interest in pursuing a career in medicine once she retires from competitive figure skating.

She married her pair skating partner, Misha Mitrofanov, in February 2024.

== Career ==
=== Early years ===
Efimova began learning to skate in 2002 at the age of two. She was originally coached by her mother and represented Finland internationally as a singles skater until 2014 when she switched from to pairs. That same year, Efimova moved to Moscow to pursue the discipline.

=== Partnership with Korovin ===
==== 2015-16 season: Debut of Efimova/Korovin ====
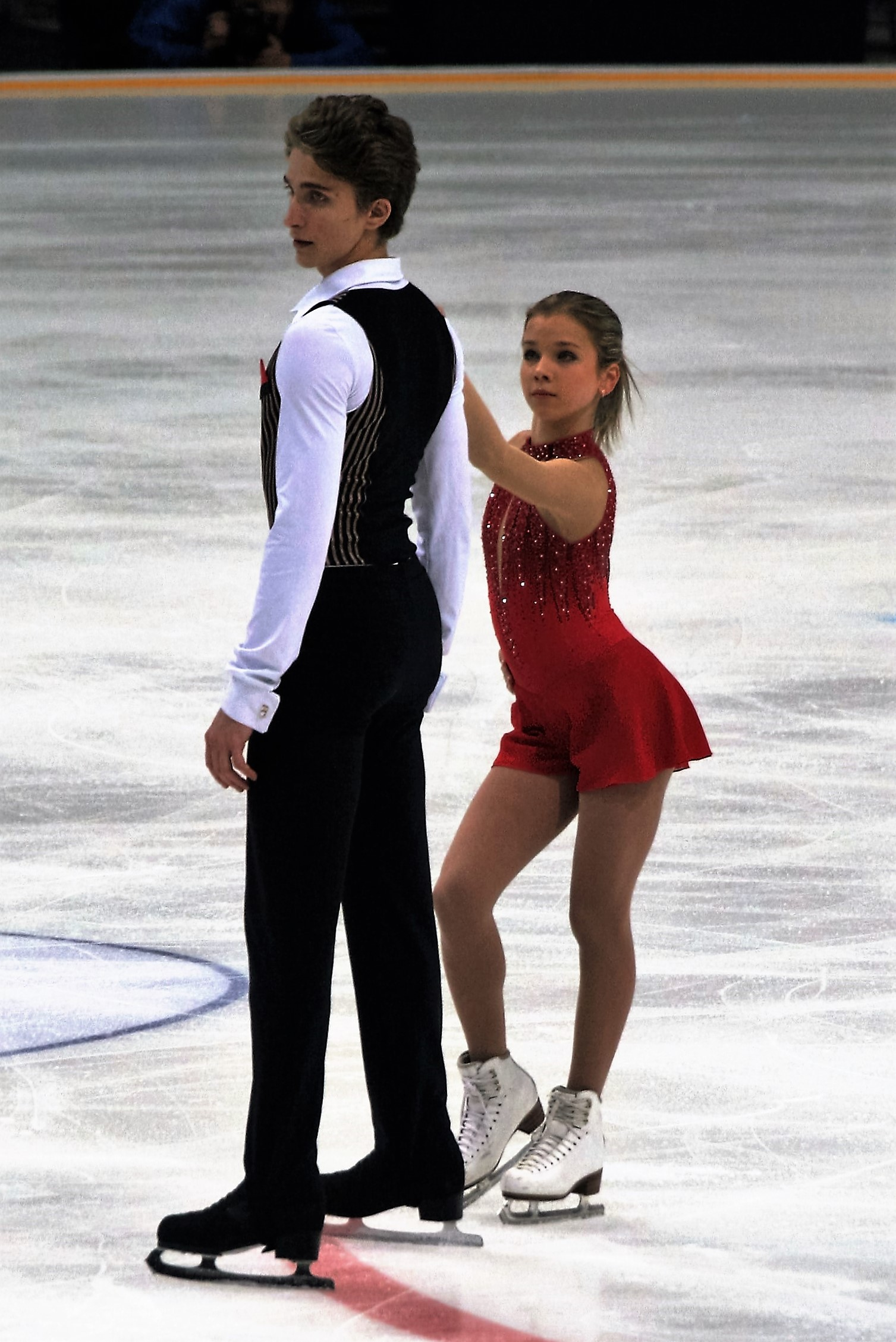
Efimova and Korovin at the 2016 Rostelecom Cup

Efimova began competing with her first pair skating partner, Alexander Korovin, in 2014. Their international debut came in February 2016 at the Hellmut Seibt Memorial. They won the silver medal, finishing second to Italy's Valentina Marchei / Ondřej Hotárek.

==== 2016-17 season: Grand Prix debut ====
Coached by Natalia Pavlova and Alexander Zaitsev in Moscow, Efimova/Korovin debuted on the Grand Prix series, placing seventh at the 2016 Rostelecom Cup in November. Later that month, the two received the silver medal at the 2016 CS Tallinn Trophy, having ranked second in the short program, first in the free skate, and second overall behind Alina Ustimkina / Nikita Volodin of Russia. After placing eighth at the 2017 Russian Championships, they took silver at the Cup of Tyrol in March 2017.

==== 2017–18 season ====
Efimova/Korovin relocated to Saint Petersburg to be coached by Oleg Vasiliev and Tamara Moskvina. In September, the pair placed fifth at their season opener, the 2017 CS Lombardia Trophy and then won bronze at the 2017 CS Ondrej Nepela Trophy a week later. In November, they took silver at the 2017 CS Tallinn Trophy behind Australia's Ekaterina Alexandrovskaya / Harley Windsor. They had no Grand Prix assignments. They finished ninth at the 2018 Russian Championships.

==== 2018–19 season: Grand Prix silver ====
In September, Efimova/Korovin won their first international gold medal at their first event of the season, the 2018 CS Nebelhorn Trophy. Ranked fourth in the short program and first in the free skate, they outscored the silver medalists, Alexa Scimeca Knierim / Chris Knierim, by 1.72 points.

Efimova/Korovin competed at two Grand Prix events, the 2018 Skate America and 2018 Rostelecom Cup. In October, Efimova/Korovin won their first Grand Prix medal, silver, at the 2018 Skate America. Ranked second in the short program and third in the free skate, they won the silver medal behind their teammates Evgenia Tarasova / Vladimir Morozov. In mid-November, they competed at the 2018 Rostelecom Cup, where they finished fifth after placing fourth in the short program and fifth in the free skate.

In early December, Efimova/Korovin won their second Challenger Series gold medal of the season at the 2018 CS Golden Spin of Zagreb. Ranked first in the short program and second in the free skate, they again narrowly beat Alexa Scimeca Knierim / Chris Knierim. This time Efimova/Korovin beat them by 1.05 points. At this event, Efimova/Korovin also scored their personal best score of 183.89 points.

At the 2019 Russian Championships, Efimova/Korovin placed sixth. They then finished the season by winning gold at the 2019 Winter Universiade.

==== 2019–20 season ====
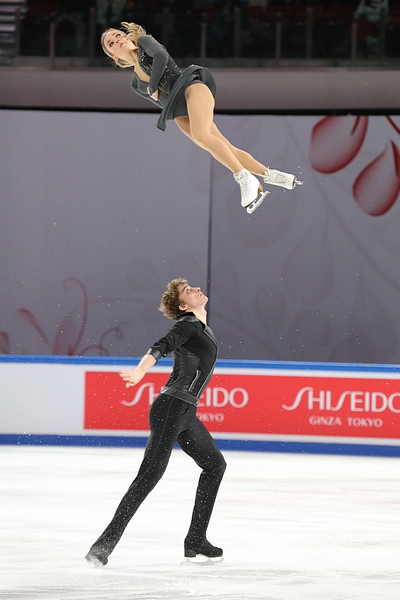
Efimova and Korovin performing a twist lift at the 2019 Cup of China

Beginning the season on the Challenger series, Efimova/Korovin were seventh at the 2019 CS Nebelhorn Trophy, then won the silver medal at the 2019 CS Finlandia Trophy. They finished eighth of eight teams at the 2019 Cup of China and placed fourth at the 2019 NHK Trophy.

At the 2020 Russian Championships, Efimova/Korovin placed fourth in the short program. The free skate was a struggle, with them placing tenth in that segment and dropping to ninth place overall.

The pair parted ways following the season.

=== Partnership with Blommaert ===
==== 2021–22 season: Debut of Efimova/Blommaert ====
In 2021, it was announced that Efimova had teamed up with German pair skater, Ruben Blommaert and that they would be coached in Oberstorf by Florian Just.

They competed at the 2021 German Championships, the pair won the silver medal behind Minerva Fabienne Hase / Nolan Seegert.

==== 2022–23 season: Grand Prix silver ====
Making their international debut together, Efimova/Blommaert won the silver medal at the 2022 CS Nebelhorn Trophy behind Deanna Stellato-Dudek / Maxime Deschamps of Canada. They then went on to win another silver medal at the 2022 CS Finlandia Trophy.

Competing on the Grand Prix series, Efimova/Blommaert competed at 2022 Skate Canada International, however, after a hard fall on a throw in the short program, Efimova bruised her thigh and the pair withdrew from the event before the free skate. Going on to compete at the 2022 Grand Prix of Espoo, Efimova/Blommaert won the silver medal behind Rebecca Ghilardi / Filippo Ambrosini of Italy. At the 2022 CS Golden Spin of Zagreb, Efimova/Blommaert finished fifth.

The pair didn't compete at the 2023 German Championships due to Blommaert coming down with a high fever a couple of days before the event. Regardless, they were still selected to compete at the 2023 European Championships in Espoo, Finland, Efimova/Blommaert placed third in the short program but fifth in the free skate and dropped to fifth place overall.

Going on to compete at the 2023 World Championships in Saitama, Japan, Efimova/Blommaert placed seventh in the short program and tenth in the free skate, finishing in tenth place overall.

Blommaert retired from competitive figure skating following the season, citing a lack of funding from the German Skating Union as one of the main reasons. Meanwhile, Efimova expressed her intention to continue competing with a new figure skating partner.

=== Partnership with Mitrofanov ===
==== 2023–24 season: Debut of Efimova/Mitrofanov ====
Upon learning about her split with Blommaert, American pair skater Misha Mitrofanov, who was looking for a new partner, messaged Efimova on Instagram, asking if she would be interested in having a pair skating tryout with him. Efimova then went on to contact Mitrofanov's longtime coaches, Aleksey Letov and Olga Ganicheva, asking if they would be interested in coaching her, to which they agreed. Following a successful tryout, Efimova moved to Norwood, Massachusetts, to train at the Skating Club of Boston with Mitrofanov. Mitrofanov later recalled, "There were some elements where we had different timing. But on other elements, it clicked almost right away, and it felt very nice. It just felt like [being] at home." It was announced in June 2023 that the pair team would represent the United States.

Following a silver win at the domestic U.S. Pairs Final, Efimova and Mitrofanov qualified for the 2024 U.S. National Championships. At the event, the pair placed fifth in the short program, but won the free skate, allowing them to move up to second place overall. “It felt really nice because our hard work was paying off,” Mitrofanov said about the free skate win.

==== 2024–25 season: First U.S. national title and Grand Prix bronze ====
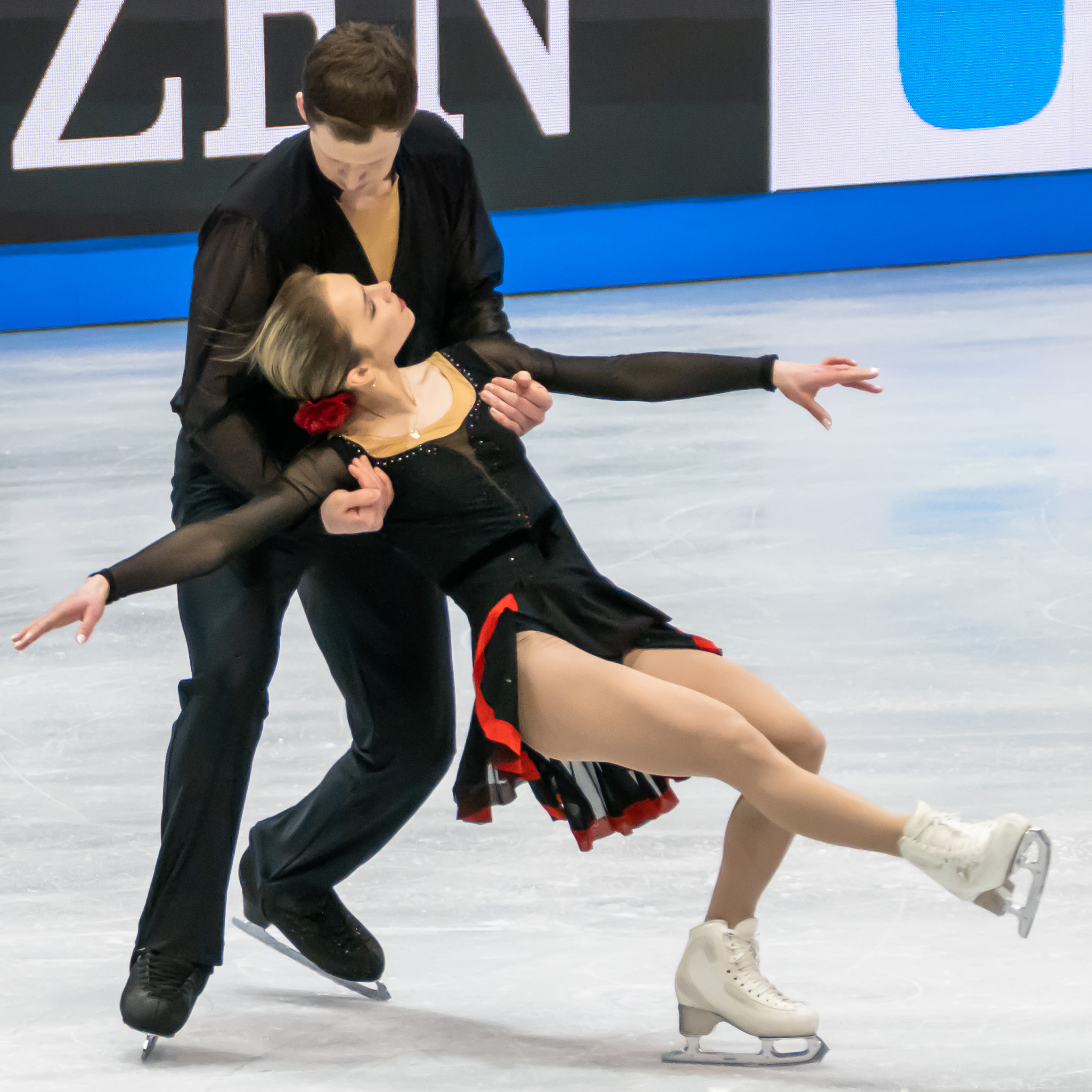
Efimova and Mitrofanov performing their short program at the 2025 World Championships

Efimova/Mitrofanov began their season by competing on the 2024–25 ISU Challenger Series. They won the silver medal at the 2024 CS John Nicks Pairs Competition before going on to finish fourth at the 2024 CS Nebelhorn Trophy.

Debuting together on the 2024–25 Grand Prix series, the pair won the bronze medal at 2024 Skate America. “Our main goal of the season is to make the World team,” said Mitrofanov. “Therefore, we need to place in the top two at nationals and show good performances.” They went on to finish fourth at the 2024 Grand Prix de France. “We were happy that we got this opportunity to skate at two Grand Prix events and even medal at Skate America," said Efimova. "That was for sure a highlight for us.”

In January, Efimova/Mitrofanov competed at the 2025 U.S. Championships. They placed third in the short program after receiving a double downgrade on their attempted side-by-side triple toe-loops. They skated a clean free skate, however, winning that competition segment and winning the gold medal overall. Efimova expressed joy at the result in an interview following the event, saying, "For us, this is the second Nationals, and I’m very proud of us that we made it to the top of the podium,” Efimova said at the post-event press conference. “And for me, this is the first Nationals overall in any country that I placed first. It was my dream right now to do it for our team, our community. They do so much for us, our coaches, our parents, our skating club and everyone. I’m just really happy that it turned out this way."

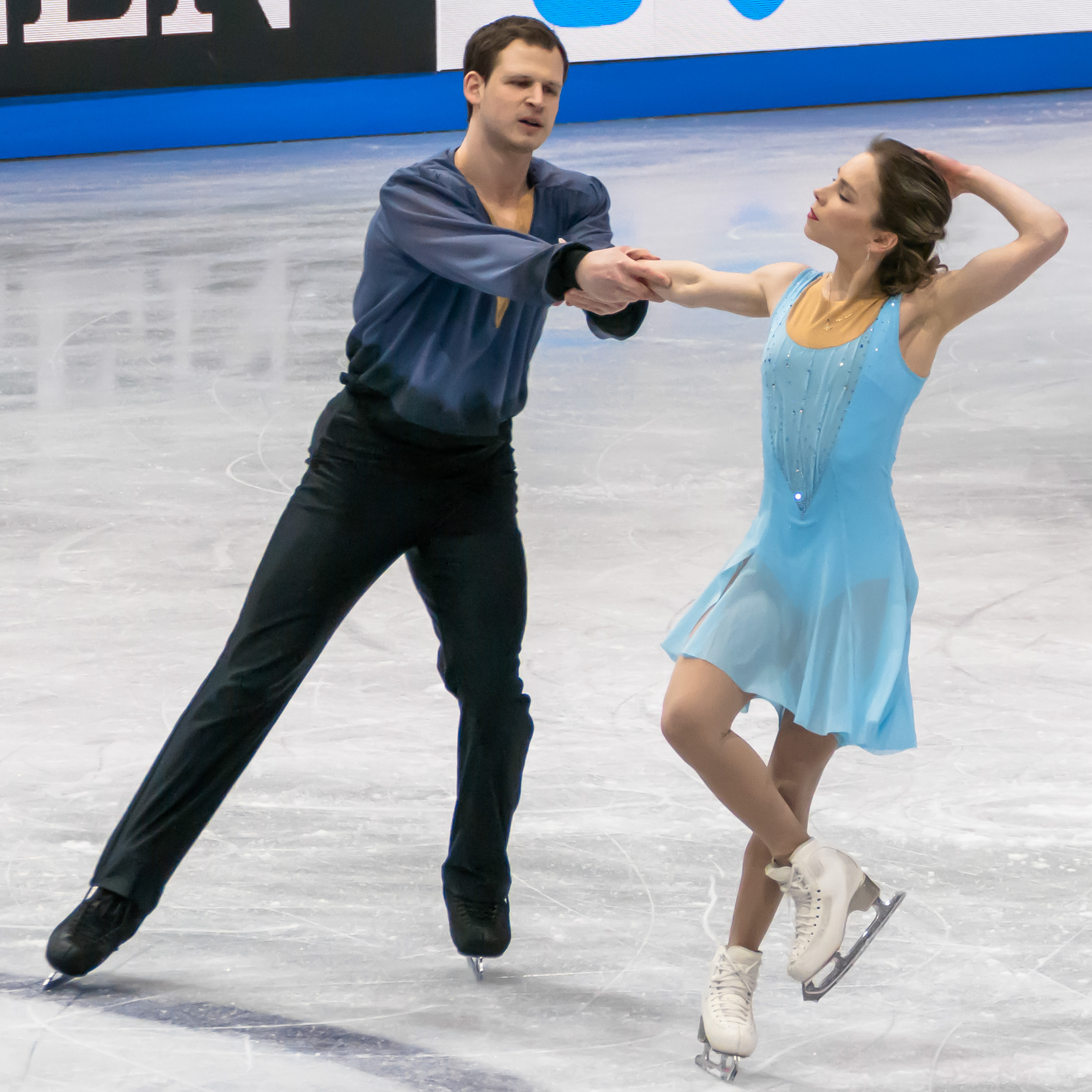
Efimova and Mitrofanov performing their free skate at the 2025 World Championships

A few days following the pair's win, however, eleven skaters and four figure skating coaches were killed in the Potomac River mid-air collision. Four of the victims were members of the Skating Club of Boston, where Efimova/Mitrofanov train. Speaking on the tragedy, Efimova shared, "This has been some of the hardest times for the sports community... We are lucky to see the family members that are with us. It is a very tough topic, but I feel just carrying the memory of those kids, parents and coaches and keeping their passion alive is something we can do and help them too maybe to handle all this. It is beautiful how the skating community and people outside of the skating community have come together, and I feel this will keep them alive or with us, part of them with us for a long time. I hope forever."

Efimova/Mitrofanov went on to compete at the 2025 Four Continents Championships in Seoul, South Korea, where they finished in fifth place. Efimova was angry at herself on the jumps in the free skate. “Mentally I made it too important for myself and that brought that stiffness and being stuck in there," she said. "I will work on those for Worlds. I’m definitely thankful to Misha that he also saw that there was a mistake, but he didn’t give me any sign that something is going wrong. We just went on the path we have been practicing. I’m very proud about that.”

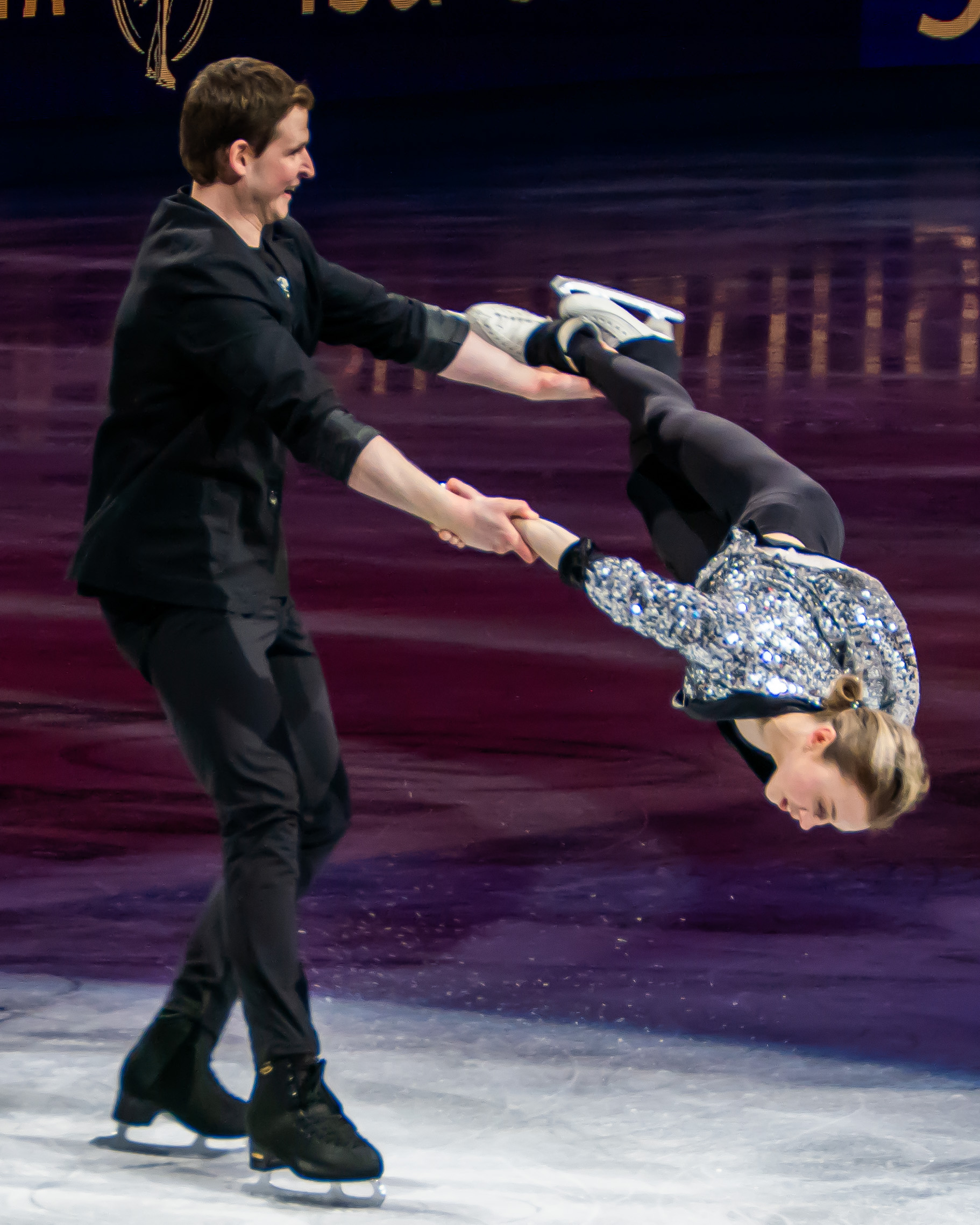
Efimova and Mitrofanov performing their exhibition program at the 2025 World Championships

On March 2, 2025, the pair took part in Legacy on Ice, an ice show organized by U.S. Figure Skating that paid tribute to lives lost aboard American Eagle Flight 5342. A couple weeks later, they competed at the 2025 World Championships in Boston, Massachusetts, United States. After, placing ninth in the short program, the pair delivered a clean free skate, placing fourth in that segment and earning a new personal best in the process. They ultimately finished the event in sixth place overall. Their placement, in addition to Kam/O'Shea's seventh-place finish, earned two berths for U.S. pair skating at the 2026 Winter Olympics. Speaking on the experience of skating at Worlds in his hometown, Mitrofanov shared, "It was absolutely unbelievable! To have Worlds in Boston, it was everything I could hope and dream for. We had that slight extra pressure, you know, like, this is home, this is worlds. So, you really want to do well. But to be honest, the support from the crowd was absolutely amazing. That’s what really helped."

Selected to compete for Team United States at the 2025 World Team Trophy, Efimova/Mitrofanov placed fifth in all segments of the pair's event, and Team United States finished in first place overall. She has spoken warmly of the relationship with the team and how, having previously spent so long training together, she appreciated "Just getting to talk and just live a little part of the life now together” in the 2025 competition.

==== 2025–26 season: Four Continents gold and Grand Prix silver ====
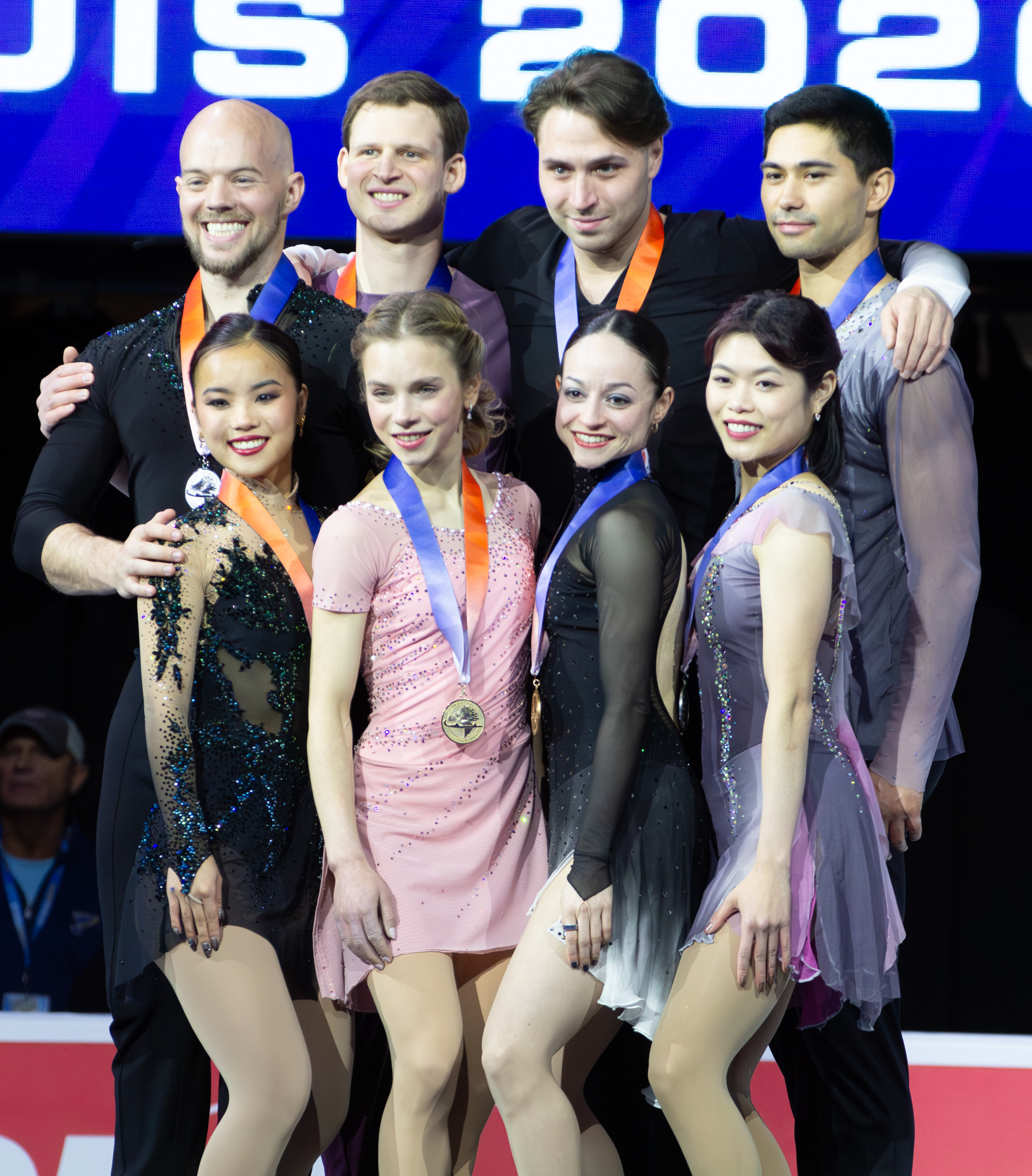
Efimova and Mitrofanov (center left) during the medal ceremony at the 2026 U.S. Championships

Going into the season, Efimova/Mitrofanov worked with choreographer Renée Roca to create a free program to the music of Love Story in tribute to two-time Olympic gold medal-winning pair team Gordeeva/Grinkov. Gordeeva herself also assisted in the program's creation.

They opened the season in August at 2025 CS John Nicks International Pairs Competition where they took silver, and followed up with a bronze medal at 2025 CS Nebelhorn Trophy. A couple months later, Efimova/Mitrofanov placed fifth at 2025 NHK Trophy and followed up with a silver medal at 2025 Finlandia Trophy. "It feels amazing! It is great that we beat the 200-mark today," said Efimova after the free skate. "We are happy with today, happy with all the work that we have put in."

In January, Efimova/Mitrofanov competed at the 2026 U.S. Championships, winning the national title for a second consecutive time. "We use this as a learning lesson going forward for the other competitions that will also have high pressure," said Mitrofanov after the event. "And so, for us, this is like a learning lesson to understand what to do next." Due to Efimova not yet having an American citizenship, the pair were not eligible for the 2026 Winter Olympic team. They were instead named to the 2026 Four Continents team and the 2026 World team.

Less than two weeks later, Efimova/Mitrofanov competed at the 2026 Four Continents Championships. They placed third in the short program and won the free skate, winning the gold medal overall. "This is my first gold medal in Four Continents championships, and I'm happy to win it with Misha," said Efimova. "I am proud of us. But overall, the athletic career and life is a long path; we just keep on moving forward."

At the 2026 World Championships, the pair finished in 6th place.

==== 2026–27 season: Two Grand Prix medals ====
Efimova/Mitrofanov opened their season on the Grand Prix series at the 2026 Skate Canada International, where they placed second overall and won the silver medal. “Overall, considering we had much less time to prepare for this Grand Prix, I think we skated with what we could today,” said Efimova. “Obviously, we know there’s a lot of things to skate in, but still, I’m happy that we were able to keep up the full package within the program.”

Two weeks later, they competed at 2026 Skate America, placing second for another silver and qualifying for the 2026–27 Grand Prix of Figure Skating Final, the first Grand Prix final of their careers. “We’re very happy that we were able to place at the second Grand Prix, because this is the first time that we were able to place at both of the events,” said Efimova. “I’m not satisfied with my skate today, but I feel like it’s now giving me a lot of fire and motivation to work, and I hope that for the next events it will be improved.”

== Programs ==
=== Pair skating with Misha Mitrofanov (for the United States) ===
| Season | Short program | Free skating | Exhibition |
|---|---|---|---|
| 2023–24 | Vladimir's Blues by Max Richter; Tourner dans le vide by Indila choreo. by Olga Ganicheva | Iron 2021 by Woodkid choreo. by Olga Ganicheva | |
| 2024–25 | Ameksa (District 78 Remix) by Taalbi Brothers & District 78; Uccen (DWTS Remix) by Taalbi Brothers choreo. by Renée Roca | Je suis malade by Serge Lama performed by Forestella choreo. by Renée Roca | Money, Money, Money by ABBA; Papa, Can You Hear Me? (from Yentl) by Michel Legrand performed by Barbra Streisand |
| 2025–26 | Reel Around the Sun (from Riverdance) by Bill Whelan choreo. by Renée Roca; Cloak and Dagger by Eternal Eclipse choreo. by Renée Roca | Where Do I Begin? (from Love Story) by Francis Lai performed by Gary Valenciano; Our Moving Story by Karl Hugo choreo. by Renée Roca | Ameksa (District 78 Remix) by Taalbi Brothers & District 78; Uccen (DWTS Remix) by Taalbi Brothers choreo. by Renée Roca |
| 2026-27 | Last Dance by Donna Summer choreo. by Renée Roca | La Yugular; Mio Cristo Piange Diamanti; Mundo Nuevo; Berghain by Rosalía choreo. by Renée Roca | |

=== Pair skating with Ruben Blommaert (for Germany) ===
| Season | Short program | Free skating | Exhibition |
|---|---|---|---|
| 2022–23 | Piano Sonata No. 14 by Ludwig van Beethoven performed by Arthur Rubinstein; Moonlight Sonata (Epic Trailer Version) performed by Hidden Citizen choreo. by Benjamin Steffan, Rostislav Sinicyn | Private Investigations by Dire Straits & Mark Knopfler; Sold My Soul by Two Wooden Stones choreo. by Benjamin Steffan, Rostislav Sinicyn | The Danger Zone by Ray Charles; Hit the Road Jack by Ray Charles performed by The Overtones ft. Beverley Knight |

=== Pair skating with Alexander Korovin (for Russia) ===
| Season | Short program | Free skating | Exhibition |
|---|---|---|---|
| 2019–20 | Carmina Burana by Carl Orff choreo. by Elena Maselennikova, Alexander Stepin | The Sound of Silence by Paul Simon performed by Disturbed choreo. by Elena Maselennikova, Alexander Stepin | |
| 2018–19 | Human by Rag'n'Bone Man choreo. by Alexander Stepin | La Strada by Nino Rota | Gypsy Dance |
| 2017–18 | Joue Jusqu'au Matin by Yoska Nemeth choreo. by Julia Goriunova | La Strada by Nino Rota | |
| 2016–17 | Chilly Cha Cha by Jessica Jay choreo. by Julia Goriunova | Tales from the Vienna Woods; Kaiser-Walzer by Johann Strauss II choreo. by Julia Goriunova | |
| 2015–16 | The Very Thought of You | New York, New York | Девятое мая performed by Soso Pavliashvili |
| 2014–15 | El día que me quieras by Raúl Di Blasio | New York, New York | |

=== Single skating (for Finland) ===
| Season | Short program | Free skating |
|---|---|---|
| 2013–14 | | The Nutcracker by Pyotr Ilyich Tchaikovsky |
| 2012–13 | | Titine (from Modern Times) |

== Competitive highlights ==
- GP – Event of the ISU Grand Prix Series
- JGP – Event of the ISU Junior Grand Prix Series
- CS – Event of the ISU Challenger Series
- TBD – Assigned
- WD – Withdrew from competition

=== Pair skating with Misha Mitrofanov (for the United States) ===
Competition placements at senior level
| Season | 2023–24 | 2024–25 | 2025–26 | 2026–27 |
|---|---|---|---|---|
| World Championships | | 6th | 6th | |
| Four Continents Championships | | 5th | 1st | |
| U.S. Championships | 2nd | 1st | 1st | |
| World Team Trophy | | 1st (5th) | | |
| Grand Prix Final | | | | TBD |
| GP France | | 4th | | |
| GP NHK Trophy | | | 5th | |
| GP Skate America | | 3rd | | 2nd |
| GP Skate Canada International | | | | 2nd |
| GP Finland | | | 2nd | |
| CS Nebelhorn Trophy | | 4th | 3rd | |
| CS John Nicks Pairs | | 2nd | 2nd | |

=== Pair skating with Ruben Blommaert (for Germany) ===
Competition placements at senior level
| Season | 2021–22 | 2022–23 |
|---|---|---|
| World Championships | | 10th |
| European Championships | | 4th |
| German Championships | 2nd | |
| GP Finland | | 2nd |
| GP Skate Canada | | WD |
| CS Finlandia Trophy | | 2nd |
| CS Golden Spin of Zagreb | | 5th |
| CS Nebelhorn Trophy | | 2nd |

=== Pair skating with Alexander Korovin (for Russia) ===
Competition placements at senior level
| Season | 2015–16 | 2016–17 | 2017–18 | 2018–19 | 2019–20 |
|---|---|---|---|---|---|
| Russian Championships | 9th | 8th | 9th | 6th | 9th |
| GP Cup of China | | | | | 8th |
| GP NHK Trophy | | | | | 4th |
| GP Rostelecom Cup | | 7th | | 5th | |
| GP Skate America | | | | 2nd | |
| CS Finlandia Trophy | | | | | 2nd |
| CS Golden Spin of Zagreb | | | | 1st | |
| CS Lombardia Trophy | | | 5th | | |
| CS Nebelhorn Trophy | | | | 1st | 7th |
| CS Ondrej Nepela Trophy | | | 3rd | | |
| CS Tallinn Trophy | | 2nd | 2nd | | |
| Cup of Tyrol | | 2nd | | | |
| Hellmut Seibt Memorial | 2nd | | | | |
| Winter Universiade | | | | 1st | |

=== Single skating (for Finland) ===
Competition placements at junior level
| Season | 2012–13 | 2013–14 |
|---|---|---|
| Finnish Championships | | 13th |
| Bavarian Open | 4th | |
| Dragon Trophy | | 16th |
| Tallinn Trophy | | 19th |
| Volvo Open Cup | 10th | |

== Detailed results ==
=== Pair skating with Misha Mitrofanov (for the United States) ===
ISU personal best scores in the +5/-5 GOE System
| Segment | Type | Score | Event |
|---|---|---|---|
| Total | TSS | 205.49 | 2025 Finlandia Trophy |
| Short program | TSS | 71.85 | 2026 Four Continents Championships, 2026 Skate America |
| Short program | TES | 39.93 | 2026 Skate America |
| Short program | PCS | 32.15 | 2026 Four Continents Championships |
| Free skating | TSS | 135.59 | 2025 World Championships |
| Free skating | TES | 70.76 | 2025 World Championships |
| Free skating | PCS | 66.29 | 2025 Finlandia Trophy |

Results in the 2023–24 season
| Date | Event | SP | | FS | | Total | |
| Date | Event | P | Score | P | Score | P | Score |
|---|---|---|---|---|---|---|---|
| Jan 22–28, 2024 | (United States) 2024 U.S. Championships | 5 | 60.48 | 1 | 126.43 | 2 | 186.91 |

Results in the 2024–25 season
| Date | Event | SP | | FS | | Total | |
| Date | Event | P | Score | P | Score | P | Score |
|---|---|---|---|---|---|---|---|
| Sep 3–4, 2024 | (United States) 2024 CS John Nicks Pairs Competition | 4 | 63.44 | 1 | 125.44 | 2 | 188.88 |
| Sep 18–21, 2024 | (Germany) 2024 CS Nebelhorn Trophy | 4 | 65.03 | 6 | 113.00 | 4 | 178.03 |
| Oct 18–20, 2024 | (United States) 2024 Skate America | 5 | 63.05 | 3 | 128.46 | 3 | 191.51 |
| Oct 31 – Nov 3, 2024 | 2024 Grand Prix de France | 4 | 64.08 | 4 | 107.84 | 4 | 171.92 |
| Jan 20–26, 2025 | (United States) 2025 U.S. Championships | 3 | 69.03 | 1 | 142.87 | 1 | 211.90 |
| Feb 19–23, 2025 | (South Korea) 2025 Four Continents Championships | 5 | 67.59 | 5 | 124.48 | 5 | 192.07 |
| Mar 25–30, 2025 | (United States) 2025 World Championships | 9 | 63.70 | 4 | 135.59 | 6 | 199.29 |
| Apr 17–20, 2025 | (Japan) 2025 World Team Trophy | 5 | 64.57 | 5 | 117.67 | 1 (5) | 182.24 |

Results in the 2025–26 season
| Date | Event | SP | | FS | | Total | |
| Date | Event | P | Score | P | Score | P | Score |
|---|---|---|---|---|---|---|---|
| Sep 2–3, 2025 | (United States) 2025 CS John Nicks International Pairs Competition | 2 | 66.85 | 2 | 126.69 | 2 | 193.54 |
| Sep 25–27, 2025 | (Germany) 2025 CS Nebelhorn Trophy | 3 | 67.42 | 3 | 126.37 | 3 | 193.79 |
| Nov 7–9, 2025 | (Japan) 2025 NHK Trophy | 5 | 69.21 | 5 | 123.79 | 5 | 193.00 |
| Nov 21–23, 2025 | (Finland) 2025 Finlandia Trophy | 3 | 70.19 | 2 | 135.30 | 2 | 205.49 |
| Jan 4–11, 2026 | (United States) 2026 U.S. Championships | 1 | 75.31 | 1 | 132.40 | 1 | 207.71 |
| Jan 21–25, 2026 | (China) 2026 Four Continents Championships | 3 | 71.85 | 1 | 133.49 | 1 | 205.34 |
| Mar 24–29, 2026 | (Czech Republic) 2026 World Championships | 7 | 67.29 | 5 | 135.22 | 6 | 202.51 |

Results in the 2026–27 season
| Date | Event | SP | | FS | | Total | |
| Date | Event | P | Score | P | Score | P | Score |
|---|---|---|---|---|---|---|---|
| Oct 30 – Nov 1, 2026 | 2026 Skate Canada International | 2 | 70.32 | 3 | 121.58 | 2 | 191.90 |
| Nov 13–15, 2026 | (United States) 2026 Skate America | 2 | 71.85 | 2 | 119.94 | 2 | 191.79 |

=== Pair skating with Ruben Blommaert ===
ISU personal best scores in the +5/-5 GOE System
| Segment | Type | Score | Event |
|---|---|---|---|
| Total | TSS | 186.17 | 2022 CS Nebelhorn Trophy |
| Short program | TSS | 67.05 | 2022 CS Nebelhorn Trophy |
| Short program | TES | 37.79 | 2022 CS Nebelhorn Trophy |
| Short program | PCS | 29.26 | 2022 CS Nebelhorn Trophy |
| Free skating | TSS | 119.23 | 2023 World Championships |
| Free skating | TES | 60.72 | 2023 World Championships |
| Free skating | PCS | 61.68 | 2022 CS Nebelhorn Trophy |

2021–2022 season
| Date | Event | SP | FS | Total |
| December 9–11, 2021 | 2022 German Championships | 2; 66.20 | 2; 118.03 | 2; 184.23 |
2022–2023 season
| Date | Event | SP | FS | Total |
| March 22–26, 2023 | 2023 World Championships | 7; 65.23 | 10; 119.23 | 10; 184.46 |
| January 25–29, 2023 | 2023 European Championships | 3; 62.77 | 5; 110.89 | 4; 173.66 |
| November 25–27, 2022 | 2022 Grand Prix of Espoo | 4; 62.46 | 2; 108.29 | 2; 170.75 |
| October 28–30, 2022 | 2022 Skate Canada International | 7; 51.49 | WD | WD |
| October 4–9, 2022 | 2022 CS Finlandia Trophy | 2; 62.54 | 2; 114.57 | 2; 177.11 |
| September 21–24, 2022 | 2022 CS Nebelhorn Trophy | 3; 67.05 | 2; 119.12 | 2; 186.17 |

=== Pair skating with Alexander Korovin ===
ISU personal best scores in the +5/-5 GOE System
| Segment | Type | Score | Event |
|---|---|---|---|
| Total | TSS | 194.28 | 2019 CS Finlandia Trophy |
| Short program | TSS | 69.12 | 2019 CS Finlandia Trophy |
| Short program | TES | 38.97 | 2019 CS Finlandia Trophy |
| Short program | PCS | 30.72 | 2018 CS Golden Spin of Zagreb |
| Free skating | TSS | 125.16 | 2019 CS Finlandia Trophy |
| Free skating | TES | 63.82 | 2019 CS Finlandia Trophy |
| Free skating | PCS | 61.81 | 2019 NHK Trophy |

ISU personal best scores in the +3/-3 GOE System
| Segment | Type | Score | Event |
|---|---|---|---|
| Total | TSS | 171.22 | 2017 CS Ondrej Nepela Trophy |
| Short program | TSS | 64.58 | 2017 CS Tallinn Trophy |
| Short program | TES | 37.22 | 2017 CS Tallinn Trophy |
| Short program | PCS | 27.36 | 2017 CS Tallinn Trophy |
| Free skating | TSS | 109.40 | 2017 CS Ondrej Nepela Trophy |
| Free skating | TES | 55.68 | 2017 CS Ondrej Nepela Trophy |
| Free skating | PCS | 55.12 | 2016 CS Tallinn Trophy |

2019–2020 season
| Date | Event | SP | FS | Total |
| 24–29 December 2019 | 2020 Russian Championships | 4; 72.83 | 10; 113.14 | 9; 185.97 |
| 22–24 November 2019 | 2019 NHK Trophy | 4; 64.94 | 4; 124.40 | 4; 189.34 |
| 8–10 November 2019 | 2019 Cup of China | 6; 63.97 | 8; 106.22 | 8; 170.19 |
| 11–13 October 2019 | 2019 CS Finlandia Trophy | 2; 69.12 | 3; 125.16 | 2; 194.28 |
| 25–28 September 2019 | 2019 CS Nebelhorn Trophy | 8; 59.94 | 7; 111.52 | 7; 171.46 |
2018–2019 season
| Date | Event | SP | FS | Total |
| 7–9 March 2019 | 2019 Winter Universiade | 2; 57.72 | 1; 113.29 | 1; 171.01 |
| 19–23 December 2018 | 2019 Russian Championships | 6; 70.61 | 6; 129.06 | 6; 199.67 |
| 5–8 December 2018 | 2018 CS Golden Spin of Zagreb | 1; 65.84 | 2; 118.05 | 1; 183.89 |
| 16–18 November 2018 | 2018 Rostelecom Cup | 4; 65.46 | 5; 116.16 | 5; 181.62 |
| 19–21 October 2018 | 2018 Skate America | 2; 62.38 | 3; 116.60 | 2; 178.98 |
| 26–29 September 2018 | 2018 CS Nebelhorn Trophy | 4; 56.42 | 1; 122.52 | 1; 178.94 |
2017–2018 season
| Date | Event | SP | FS | Total |
| 21–24 December 2017 | 2018 Russian Championships | 8; 63.44 | 10; 113.19 | 9; 176.63 |
| 21–26 November 2017 | 2017 CS Tallinn Trophy | 2; 64.58 | 3; 98.04 | 2; 162.62 |
| 21–23 September 2017 | 2017 CS Ondrej Nepela Trophy | 3; 61.82 | 3; 109.40 | 3; 171.22 |
| 14–17 September 2017 | 2017 CS Lombardia Trophy | 5; 56.54 | 6; 104.16 | 5; 160.70 |
2016–2017 season
| Date | Event | SP | FS | Total |
| 28 February – 5 March 2017 | 2017 Cup of Tyrol | 2; 59.88 | 2; 101.70 | 2; 161.58 |
| 20–26 December 2016 | 2017 Russian Championships | 6; 63.69 | 8; 112.91 | 8; 176.60 |
| 20–27 November 2016 | 2016 CS Tallinn Trophy | 2; 57.62 | 1; 103.06 | 2; 160.68 |
| 4–6 November 2016 | 2016 Rostelecom Cup | 6; 61.27 | 7; 103.80 | 7; 165.07 |
2015–2016 season
| Date | Event | SP | FS | Total |
| 23–28 February 2016 | 2016 Hellmut Seibt Memorial | 2; 50.21 | 2; 112.26 | 2; 162.47 |
| 23–27 December 2015 | 2016 Russian Championships | 11; 54.34 | 9; 106.96 | 9; 161.30 |
