= Marina Shirshova =

Russian-Finnish figure skating coach

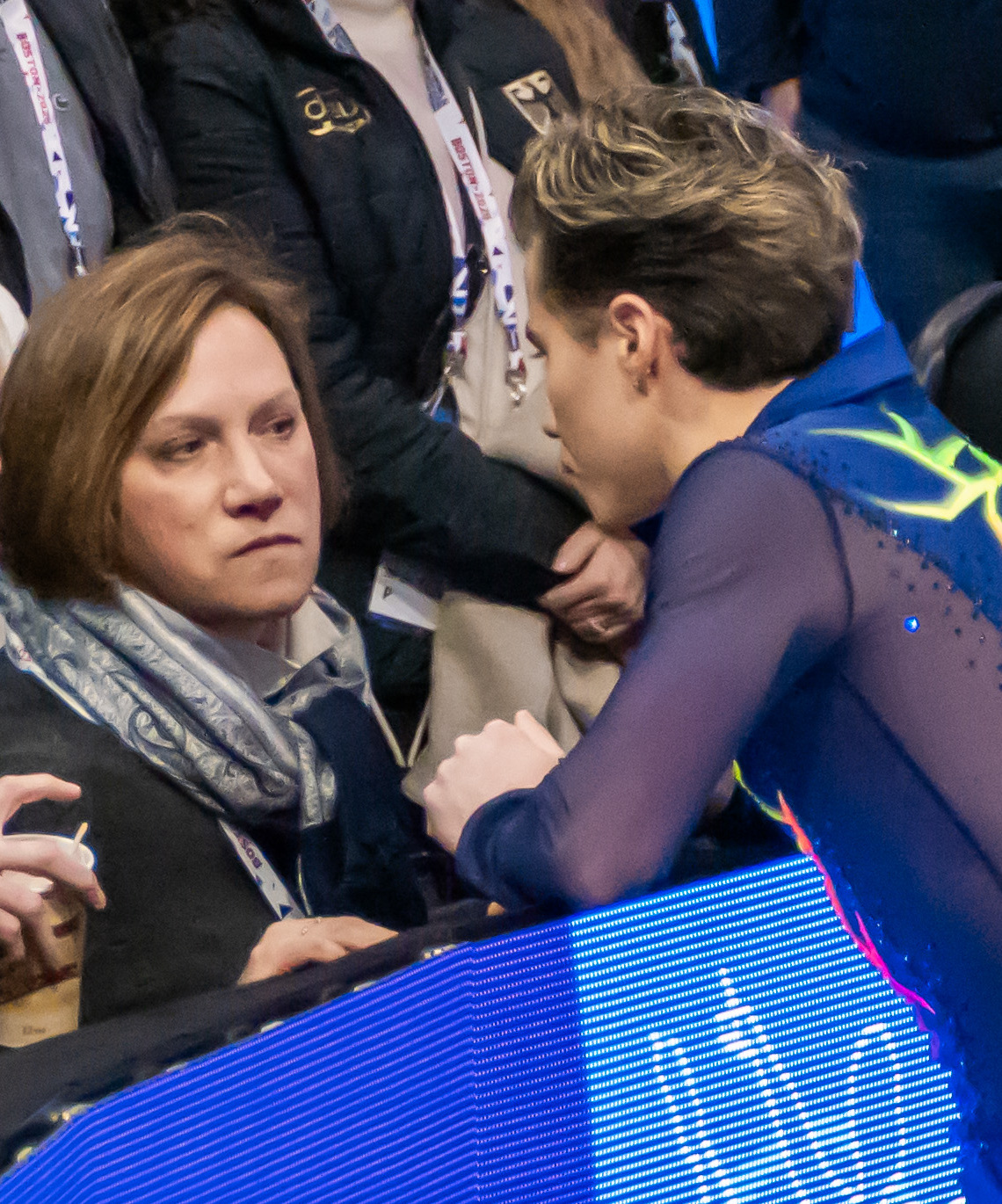
- Marina Shirshova in 2025

Personal information
- Native name: Марина Ширшова
- Nationality: Finland
- Born: Soviet Union

Figure skating career
- Country: Finland

Marina Shirshova (Russian: Марина Ширшова) is a Russian-Finnish figure skating coach, choreographer and program designer. She has been working in Finland since the mid-1990s and has coached several national champions in various age categories.

== Personal life ==
Marina Shirshova was born in Russia, where she trained in figure skating and later transitioned into coaching after completing her competitive career.

She moved to Finland in the mid-1990s. In the late 1990s, she worked as a head coach at the Finnish figure skating club Kouvolan Taitoluistelijat (Kouvola), where she coached young skaters and developed training programs for competitive athletes.

Later she continued her coaching career in Southern Finland, including working with the club Lappeenrannan Taitoluistelijat, where she served both as a coach and as a choreographer.

Her husband, Boris Efimov, is a physician. The pair have two children Alisa and Nikita, with the former being a pair skater that currently competes for the United States. Shirshova is also the mother-in-law of American pair skater, Misha Mitrofanov.

== Coaching career ==
Shirshova is known for her work with young skaters, novices and junior-level athletes. Her training focuses on skating skills, flexibility, choreography and development of performance quality. Her coaching work has been covered by Finnish national broadcaster Yle, including reporting on her role as the coach of Finnish skater Iida Karhunen. She has more than 20 years of coaching experience and is regarded as one of the most experienced specialists in Southern Finland. She later founded the SM Skating School in Lappeenranta.

=== Collaboration with the German Figure Skating Federation ===
Shirshova has collaborated with the Deutsche Eislauf-Union (DEU). In 2024, she was part of the coaching team for the DEU B-level coach education programme. In 2025, the DEU announced her as part of its international coaching staff working alongside Russian coach Alexei Mishin.

=== Camps and international collaboration ===
In addition to her regular coaching work, Shirshova has participated in international training camps in Finland. She has served as a coach at figure skating camps in Imatra alongside international specialists, including Adam Sola. In 2024, Shirshova co-hosted a high-level training camp in Imatra attended by Belgian skater Loena Hendrickx. She was also listed as a guest coach for the 2025 season of Bootcamp on Ice, organised by Belgian skater Jorik Hendrickx.

== Notable students ==
=== Finland ===
- Iida Karhunen – Finnish junior national champion (2023, 2024, 2025) and Finnish senior national champion 2026. She placed fourth at the 2024 World Junior Championships.
- Alisa Mikonsaari – Finnish junior national champion (2008, 2009).
- Janna Jyrkinen – Finnish junior national champion (2022) and Finnish senior national champion (2023); top-10 finisher at the 2023 European Championships.
- Roman Galay – Finnish senior national champion (2020, 2021).
- Juho Pirinen – Finnish national-level competitor and former student.

=== Germany ===
- Nikita Starostin – German senior national champion (2023, 2025); coached by Shirshova as a technical coach. His coaching relationship with Shirshova has been documented by Golden Skate, Figureskatersonline and IceDance Berlin.

=== Pair skating ===
- Alisa Efimova – Trained with Shirshova during her early skating career until 2014 when she switched from women singles to pair skating.

== Honours ==
- Kultainen ansiomerkki (Golden Merit Badge), Finnish Figure Skating Association, 2020.
