= Left in the Dark =

1981 song

Song by Jim Steinman

from the album Bad for Good
- Released: April 1981
- Recorded: August 1980 – March 1981
- Genre: Wagnerian rock
- Length: 7:58
- Label: Epic
- Songwriter: Jim Steinman
- Producers: John Jansen, Todd Rundgren, Jim Steinman, Jimmy Iovine

"Left in the Dark"

Single by Barbra Streisand

from the album Emotion
- B-side: "Here We Are at Last"
- Released: September 1984
- Recorded: June 18, 1984
- Studio: Power Station (New York, NY); The Village (Los Angeles, CA)
- Genre: Pop
- Length: 7:12 (album version)
- Label: Columbia
- Songwriter: Jim Steinman
- Producer: Jim Steinman

Barbra Streisand singles chronology
"Papa, Can You Hear Me?" (1984)	"Left in the Dark" (1984)	"Make No Mistake, He's Mine" (1984)

"Left in the Dark" is a song by Jim Steinman from his only solo album Bad for Good.

The song gained more notice performed by Barbra Streisand when it was released as the lead single from her album Emotion in autumn 1984. It was also recorded by Meat Loaf on the album Welcome to the Neighbourhood in 1995.

== Barbra Streisand version ==
Streisand's rendition of the song is a power ballad which tells about experiences of a woman who finds out her partner has been cheating on her. "Left in the Dark" met with moderate commercial success internationally. The percussive synth sound in the intro is taken from Billy Squier's song "All Night Long", a track which was also produced by Steinman in 1984.

=== Music video ===
The music video for the song was Barbra's first video intended for MTV. Filmed within three days in Los Angeles in September 1984, it was directed by Jonathan Kaplan and included an appearance from Kris Kristofferson. The six-minute video portrays Barbra as a lounge singer entangled in a love triangle, with Kristofferson playing her partner.

=== Critical reception ===
Cashbox praised "Left in the Dark" as a "dramatic ballad", describing Streisand's vocals as having "inimitably sensational capacity" and highlighting the song's "soulful intensity".

=== Track listings ===
- 7" Single

A1. "Intro" – 0:44
A2. "Left in the Dark" – 6:12
B. "Here We Are at Last" – 3:18

- 7" Promotional Single

A. "Left in the Dark" (without spoken intro) – 4:58
B. "Left in the Dark" (with spoken intro) – 5:42

=== Charts ===
Chart (1984)	Peak position
Australia (Kent Music Report)	27
Belgium (Ultratop 50 Flanders)	27
Canada Top Singles (RPM)	87
Netherlands (Dutch Top 40)	20
UK Singles (OCC)	85
US Billboard Hot 100	50
US Cash Box Top 100 Singles	37

== Other cover versions ==
In 1995, Swedish singer Cecilia Vennersten released a version of the song, translated into Swedish by Nanne Grönvall under the title "Lämnad i mörkret", on her self-titled debut solo album.

Meat Loaf also covered the song on his 1995 album "Welcome To The Neighborhood".
