= Emotion (Barbra Streisand album) =

Studio album by Barbra Streisand
- Released: October 9, 1984
- Recorded: May 17 – June 24, 1984
- Studios: Studio 55, Los Angeles; Record One, Los Angeles; Ocean Way, Los Angeles; Evergreen, Burbank; The Complex, Los Angeles; Soundcastle, Los Angeles; Capitol, Los Angeles; The Village, Los Angeles; Power Station, New York; House of Music, West Orange, NJ; Bill Schnee, Hollywood; Rumbo, Los Angeles
- Genre: Pop
- Length: 46:12
- Label: Columbia
- Producers: Richard Baskin; Kim Carnes; Bill Cuomo; Albhy Galuten; Charles Koppelman; Richard Perry; Jim Steinman; Barbra Streisand; Maurice White

Barbra Streisand chronology
| Yentl (1983) | Emotion (1984) | The Broadway Album (1985) |

Singles from Emotion
- 1. "Left in the Dark" Released: September 1984; 2. "Make No Mistake, He's Mine" Released: December 1984; 3. "Emotion" Released: March 1985

Emotion is the twenty-third studio album by American singer Barbra Streisand, released in October 1984 by Columbia Records. It was her first studio album in four years after the release of Guilty, which has since become her highest selling studio album worldwide.

The album was promoted with the release of three singles, but none of them entered the top forty of the Billboard Hot 100. The album wasn't as successful as its predecessor, having peaked at number 19 on the US Billboard 200 chart and was certified Platinum in the US by the RIAA and Gold in the UK by the BPI.

== Overview ==
This album was recorded in eleven studios in Los Angeles and two in New York with a multitude of producers and composers. Produced by Jim Steinman, "Left in the Dark" was the lead single, peaking at #50 on the Billboard Hot 100. "Make No Mistake, He's Mine", a duet with Kim Carnes, was the album's second single and charted at #8 on the Adult Contemporary chart and #51 on the Billboard Hot 100. The final single, "Emotion", featuring the Pointer Sisters on background vocals, was also released as extended 12" remix.

An instrumental version of "Here We Are At Last" appeared on the soundtrack of the 1987 feature film Nuts.

The video for "Left in the Dark" reunited Streisand with Kris Kristofferson, her co-star from A Star Is Born. The video to the album's title track, which received some airplay on MTV, featured cameos from The Who's Roger Daltrey and Mikhail Baryshnikov.

The album peaked at #19 on the US Billboard 200 and #15 on the UK Pop Album chart. Emotion has also been certified Platinum in the US by the RIAA and Gold in the UK by the BPI.

In 2023, in her memoir My Name Is Barbra, Streisand described the album as a "hodgepodge", vowing to "never again" make a pop record like Emotion.

== Critical reception ==
Professional ratings
Review scores
| Source | Rating |
|---|---|
| AllMusic | 3/5 stars |

Cash Box wrote that the album was dominated by "soft, emotional ballads" and was "destined for tremendous retail and radio success", while Billboard noted that it spans styles from "lush orchestral pop to rock", unified by Streisand's "sense of adventure and imagination". The magazine called "Left in the Dark" a "bloated melodrama", but praised the album for offering "a half dozen real gems" and singled out "Here We Are at Last" as its "classiest cut".

In a retrospective review, AllMusic described the album as a typical "'80s adult contemporary superstar release", praising Streisand's ability to handle contrasting styles, from Maurice White's "space-age R&B" to Jim Steinman's "melodramatic overproduction". However, the review found that the album "lacked consistency" and noted that it sold mainly to Streisand's established fan base.

== Track listing ==
| No. | Title | Writer(s) | Length |
|---|---|---|---|
| 1. | "Emotion" | Peter Bliss | 4:58 |
| 2. | "Make No Mistake, He's Mine" (with Kim Carnes) | Carnes | 4:10 |
| 3. | "Time Machine" | Maurice White, Martin George Page, Brian Fairweather | 4:56 |
| 4. | "Best I Could" | Bobby Whiteside, Richard Parker | 4:21 |
| 5. | "Left in the Dark" | Jim Steinman | 7:13 |
| 6. | "Heart Don't Change My Mind" | Diane Warren, Robbie Buchanan | 4:56 |
| 7. | "When I Dream" | Kathy Wakefield, Richard Baskin | 4:31 |
| 8. | "You're a Step in the Right Direction" | Barbra Streisand, John Mellencamp | 3:54 |
| 9. | "Clear Sailing" | Peter McIan, Anne Black Montgomery | 3:56 |
| 10. | "Here We Are at Last" | Streisand, Richard Baskin | 3:19 |

== Unreleased songs ==
- "When the Lovin' Goes Out of the Lovin'"
- "How Do You Keep the Music Playing" (later re-recorded and included on The Movie Album)

== Personnel ==
Vocalists and Musicians

- Barbra Streisand – vocals
- Steve Mitchell – synthesizers (1)
- Howie Rice – synthesizers (1), guitars (1)
- Richard Ruttenberg – synthesizers (1)
- Bill Cuomo – acoustic piano (2), synthesizers (2), strings (2)
- Robbie Buchanan – keyboards (3, 6, 7), synthesizers (3, 6, 7, 10), synthesizer programming (3, 6, 7)
- Michel Colombier – keyboards (3, 6, 7), synthesizers (10)
- Gary Chang – additional synthesizer programming (3, 6, 7)
- Ed Tossing – acoustic piano (4), Fender Rhodes (4)
- Randy Waldman – synthesizers (4)
- Roy Bittan – acoustic piano (5)
- Larry Fast – synthesizers (5)
- Albhy Galuten – keyboards (8, 9), vocal synthesizer (8, 9)
- James Newton Howard – keyboards (8, 9)
- Peter Bliss – guitars (1), drum machine programming (1)
- Dennis Herring – guitars (1)
- Craig Hull – guitars (2)
- Paul Jackson Jr. – guitars (3, 6, 7, 10)
- George Doering – guitars (4)
- Bruce Gaitsch – guitars (4)
- Rick Derringer – lead guitar (5)
- Jeff Southworth – additional guitars (5)
- Dann Huff – guitar solo (6)
- Don Felder – guitars (8)
- Steve Lukather – guitars (8)
- Art Johnson – volume pedal guitar (10)
- Nathan East – bass (1, 8)
- Leland Sklar – bass (2)
- Abraham Laboriel – bass (3, 6, 7)
- Bob Lizik – bass (4)
- Steve Buslowe – bass (5)
- Neil Stubenhaus – bass (10)
- Gary Mallaber – drums (2)
- John Robinson – drums (3, 6, 7, 10)
- Tom Radtke – drums (4)
- Vincent Gutman – drum programming (4)
- Max Weinberg – drums (5)
- Russ Kunkel – drums (8)
- Vinnie Colaiuta – drums (10)
- Paulinho da Costa – percussion (1, 3, 6, 7)
- Steve Forman – percussion (4)
- Jimmy Maelen – percussion (5)
- Joe Porcaro – percussion (8)
- Lon Price – saxophone solo (7)
- Jerry Peterson – saxophones (10)
- John Phillips – saxophones (10)
- Ray Kelley – cello (2)
- Sid Sharp – concertmaster (2, 10)
- Endre Granat – concertmaster (4)
- The Pointer Sisters – backing vocals (1)
- Kim Carnes – vocals (2)
- Clydene Jackson Edwards – backing vocals (3, 6, 7)
- Julia Waters Tillman – backing vocals (3, 6, 7)
- Maxine Willard Waters – backing vocals (3, 6, 7)
- Maurice White – backing vocals (3, 6, 7)
- Rory Dodd – backing vocals (5)
- Holly Sherwood – backing vocals (5)
- Eric Troyer – backing vocals (5)
- Monty Byrom – backing vocals (8)

Music arrangements

- Bill Cuomo – string arrangements (2)
- Robbie Buchanan – horn arrangements (3, 6)
- Brian Fairweather – rhythm arrangements (3)
- Martin Page – rhythm arrangements (3)
- Maurice White – rhythm arrangements (3), vocal arrangements (3, 6, 7)
- Bobby Whiteside – arrangements and conductor (4)
- Jim Steinman – arrangements (5)
- Michel Colombier – string arrangements (7), rhythm arrangements (10)
- Albhy Galuten – string arrangements (9)
- James Newton Howard – string arrangements (9)
- Lee Holdridge – orchestra arrangements and conductor (10)

== Production ==
- Charles Koppelman – executive producer, producer (4)
- Richard Perry – producer (1)
- Kim Carnes – producer (2)
- Bill Cuomo – producer (2)
- Maurice White – producer (3, 6, 7)
- Barbra Streisand – producer (4, 10)
- Jim Steinman – producer (5)
- John Jansen – associate producer (5)
- Albhy Galuten – producer (8, 9)
- Richard Baskin – producer (10)
- Bradford Rosenberger – production coordinator (1)
- Chip Croop – production staff (3, 6, 7)
- Leonard Smith – production staff (3, 6, 7)
- Geri White – production staff (3, 6, 7)
- Kim Skalecki – production coordinator (4, 10)
- Don Ketteler – production coordinator (5)
- Ivy Skoff – production coordinator (8, 9)
- Linda Gerrity – production coordinator for The Entertainment Music Company
- Greg Gorman – front cover photography
- Steve Schapiro – back cover photography

Technical credits

- Stephen Marcussen – mastering at Precision Lacquer (Hollywood, California)
- Gary Skardina – tracking engineer (1)
- John Arrias – overdub engineer (1), vocal engineer (1), remixing (1), mixing (2), engineer (4, 10), mastering supervisor
- Niko Bolas – tracking engineer (2)
- Mike Hatcher – string engineer (2)
- John Richards – string engineer (2)
- Dennis McCade – recording (3, 6, 7)
- Jeremy Smith – recording (3, 6, 7)
- Neil Dorfsman – engineer (5), mixing (5)
- John Jansen – mixing (5)
- Jim Steinman – mixing (5)
- Jack Joseph Puig – engineer (8, 9), mixing (8, 9)
- Albhy Galuten – mixing (8, 9)
- Don Gehman – mixing (8), additional engineer (8, 9)
- Ed Cherney – engineer (10)
- Mick Guzauski – engineer (10)
- Roger Paglia – additional engineer (1)
- Alex Schmoll – additional engineer (1), assistant engineer (1)
- Rik Pekkonen – additional engineer (2)
- David Dubow – assistant engineer (1)
- Richard Bosworth – second tracking engineer (2)
- Glen Holguin – second mix engineer (2), assistant mix engineer (4)
- Judy Clapp – additional second engineer (2), assistant engineer (8, 9)
- Steve Crimmel – additional second engineer (2)
- Murray Dvorkan – assistant engineer (3, 6, 7)
- Paul Ericksen – assistant engineer (3, 6, 7)
- Mitch Gibson – assistant engineer (3, 6, 7)
- Sharon Rice – assistant engineer (3, 6, 7)
- Hugh Davies – assistant engineer (4)
- Nelson Ayres – assistant engineer (5)
- Dave Greenberg – assistant engineer (5)
- Steve Hirsch – assistant engineer (5)
- Bruce Lampcov – assistant engineer (5)
- Greg Droman – assistant engineer (8, 9)
- Mark Ettel – assistant engineer (8, 9)
- David Schober – assistant engineer (8, 9)
- Paul Wertheimer – assistant engineer (10)

== Charts ==
=== Weekly charts ===
| Chart (1984) | Peak position |
|---|---|
| Austrian Albums (Ö3 Austria) | 13 |
| Dutch Albums (Album Top 100) | 12 |
| European Albums (Music & Media) | 22 |
| German Albums (Offizielle Top 100) | 40 |
| New Zealand Albums (RMNZ) | 25 |
| Norwegian Albums (VG-lista) | 13 |
| Swedish Albums (Sverigetopplistan) | 23 |
| Swiss Albums (Schweizer Hitparade) | 17 |
| UK Albums (Official Charts) | 15 |
| US Billboard 200 | 19 |
| US Cashbox Top Albums | 15 |

=== Year-end charts ===
| Chart (1984) | Position |
|---|---|
| US Cash Box | 61 |

== Certifications and sales ==
| Region | Certification | Certified units/sales |
|---|---|---|
| Australia (ARIA) | Platinum | 70,000^{^} |
| Canada (Music Canada) | Gold | 50,000^{^} |
| Netherlands (NVPI) | Gold | 50,000^{^} |
| New Zealand (RMNZ) | Platinum | 15,000^{^} |
| United Kingdom (BPI) | Gold | 100,000^{^} |
| United States (RIAA) | Platinum | 1,000,000^{^} |
^{^} Shipments figures based on certification alone.
