= Janna Jyrkinen =

Finnish figure skater

Personal information
- Born: 14 February 2007 (age 19) Helsinki, Finland
- Height: 1.63 m (5 ft 4 in)

Figure skating career
- Country: Finland
- Discipline: Women's singles
- Coach: Alisa Drei
- Skating club: Espoon Taitoluisteluklubi ry
- Began skating: 2011

Medal record
Finnish Championships
Gold medal – first place	2023 Joensuu	Singles
Bronze medal – third place	2025 Rauma	Singles

Janna Jyrkinen (born 14 February 2007) is a Finnish figure skater. She is the 2022 CS Warsaw Cup bronze medalist, the 2022 Volvo Open Cup champion, and the 2023 Finnish national champion. She achieved a top-ten result at the 2023 European Championships, where she finished seventh.

== Personal life ==
Jyrkinen was born on 14 February 2007 in Helsinki, Finland. She has a younger sister named Elina.

She is currently a student at the University of Turku.

== Career ==
=== Early career ===
Jyrkinen began figure skating in 2013.

She won the Finnish Novice Championships in 2019. The following year, she won the bronze medal at the 2019–20 Finnish Junior Championships.

Jyrkinen went on to win gold at the 2020 Volvo Open Cup and finish fifth on at the 2021 Tallink Hotels Cup.

=== 2021–22 season ===
Jyrkinen made her international debut on the 2021–22 Junior Grand Prix series, finishing ninth at the 2021 JGP France and 2021 JGP Austria, before going on to finish seventh at the 2021 Santa Claus Cup.

Jyrkinen would then go on to win gold at 2021–22 Finnish Junior Championships and 2022 Nordic Championships. She finished her season at the 2022 Jégvirág Cup and the 2022 Bavarian Open, where she placed second and sixth, respectively.

=== 2022–23 season ===
Making her senior international level debut, Jyrkinen started the season with an eleventh-place finish at the 2022 CS Lombardia Trophy and a tenth-place finish at the 2022 CS Finlandia Trophy. She then went on to win gold and bronze at the 2022 Volvo Open Cup and 2022 CS Warsaw Cup, respectively.

A few days before the 2022 Grand Prix of Espoo was scheduled to take place, Emmi Peltonen was forced to withdraw after testing positive for COVID-19. As a result, Jyrkinen was called up to replace her. Due to this, Jyrkinen also had to withdraw from the 2022 NRW Trophy, which she was originally assigned to compete at, due to the event taking place at the same time as the Grand Prix of Espoo. Making her senior Grand Prix debut, Jyrkinen placed twelfth in the short program out of the twelve skaters at the event after popping a planned triple lutz and triple flip into singles. She went on to deliver a solid free skate, placing seventh in that segment of the competition and finishing tenth overall.

Competing at both the 2022–23 Finnish Championships, Jyrkinen won her first senior national title.

At the 2023 European Championships in Espoo, Finland, Jyrkinen entered the event as the home favorite and the only Finnish woman singles skater competing at the event. Jyrkinen delivered two strong performances, placing eighth in the short program, seventh in the free skate, and seventh overall. Her top ten placement earned two spots for Finnish women singles skaters for the 2024 European Championships. Jyrkinen went on to compete at the 2023 Nordic Championships and the 2023 International Challenge Cup, finishing second and twelfth, respectively.

At the 2023 World Championships in Saitama, Japan, Jyrkinen managed to qualify for the free skate segment of the competition after placing twenty-first in the short program. She would also go on to place twenty-first in the free skate segment of the competition, finishing twenty-first overall.

=== 2023–24 season ===
Jyrkinen struggled with a growth spurt during the season, which caused issues with her skating technique, and unspecified difficulties with her situation in Lappeenranta; she considered quitting the sport but continued with the support of people close to her.

She began the season at the 2023 CS Lombardia Trophy, coming eleventh, before finishing eighth on home ice at the 2023 CS Finlandia Trophy. On the Grand Prix, she came twelfth of twelve skaters at the 2023 Grand Prix de France and then eleventh at Finland's own 2023 Grand Prix of Espoo.

After placing fifth in the short program at the 2024 Nordic Championships, Jyrkinen withdrew from the event.

=== 2024–25 season ===
Jyrkinen spent the summer adapting her skating technique to her growth spurt. In August 2024, it was announced that Jyrkinen had left her coach, Marina Shirshova, to be coached by Alisa Drei. She moved to live alone in Helsinki.

She started the season by competing on the 2024–25 ISU Challenger Series circuit, finishing eighth at the 2024 CS Nebelhorn Trophy and the 2024 CS Budapest Trophy and fourth at the 2024 CS Trophée Métropole Nice Côte d'Azur. She would follow these results up with a fourth-place finish at the 2024 Volvo Open Cup. Selected as a host pick at the 2024 Finlandia Trophy, Jyrkinen finished the event in tenth place.

In December, she won the bronze medal at the 2025 Finnish Championships. The following month, Jyrkinen finished sixth at the 2025 Winter World University Games.

Selected to compete at the 2025 European Championships in Tallinn, Estonia, Jyrkinen placed eighteenth overall. She subsequently went on to compete at the Road to 26 Trophy, an Olympic test event, but withdrew following the short program.

=== 2025–26 season ===
Janna finished 6th at the 2026 Finnish Championships.

== Programs ==
Season	Short program	Free skating	Exhibition
2025–2026	Start a War (from Riverdale) by Klergy & Valerie Broussard arranged by Cédric Tour choreo. by Benoît Richaud	The Godfather; The Godfather Waltz by Nino Rota performed by Nic Raine; Godfather Waltz by Nino Rota performed by André Rieu; Tarantella by Carmine Coppola performed by Paul Bateman; Speak Softly, Love by Nino Rota performed by Simone all arranged by Cédric Tour choreo. by Benoît Richaud	
2024–2025	Start a War (from Riverdale) by Klergy & Valerie Broussard arranged by Cédric Tour choreo. by Benoît Richaud	Wake of Death; Maria (from Mary of Nazareth) by Guy Farley; Royal Rendant by Power-Haus & Tom Evans choreo. by Benoît Richaud	
2023–2024	Flowers performed by Miley Cyrus & Brooklyn Duo choreo. by Adam Solya	The Story of Voyages by Alfred Schnittke choreo. by Adam Solya	Big Spender performed by Peggy Lee; Jumpin' Jack by Big Bad Voodoo Daddy choreo. by Anastasia Bunina
2022–2023	Your Heart Is As Black As Night by Melody Gardot performed by Beth Hart & Joe Bonamassa choreo. by Anastasia Bunina	The Story of Voyages by Alfred Schnittke choreo. by Adam Solya	Big Spender performed by Peggy Lee; Jumpin' Jack by Big Bad Voodoo Daddy choreo. by Anastasia Bunina
2021–2022	Your Heart Is As Black As Night by Melody Gardot performed by Beth Hart & Joe Bonamassa choreo. by Anastasia Bunina	Morning Mood; In the Hall of the Mountain King (from Peer Gynt) by Edvard Grieg choreo. by Anastasia Bunina	
2020–2021	Big Spender performed by Peggy Lee; Jumpin' Jack by Big Bad Voodoo Daddy choreo. by Anastasia Bunina	Morning Mood; In the Hall of the Mountain King (from Peer Gynt) by Edvard Grieg choreo. by Anastasia Bunina	

== Competitive highlights ==
- GP – Event of the ISU Grand Prix Series
- JGP – Event of the ISU Junior Grand Prix Series
- CS – Event of the ISU Challenger Series
- WD – Withdrew from competition
- C – Event was cancelled

Competition placements at senior level
Season	2022–23	2023–24	2024–25	2025–26	2026–27
World Championships	21st				
European Championships	7th		18th		
Finnish Championships	1st		3rd	6th	
GP Finland	10th	11th	10th		11th
GP France		12th			
CS Budapest Trophy			8th		
CS Finlandia Trophy	10th	8th			
CS Lombardia Trophy	11th	11th			
CS Nebelhorn Trophy			8th		
CS Tallinn Trophy				15th	
CS Trophée Métropole Nice			4th		
CS Warsaw Cup	3rd				
Challenge Cup	12th				
Denkova-Staviski Cup					6th
Nordic Championships	2nd	WD			
Road to 26 Trophy			WD		
Volvo Open Cup	1st		4th	11th	
Winter University Games			6th		

Competition placements at junior level
Season	2019–20	2020–21	2021–22
Finnish Championships	3rd	C	1st
JGP Austria			9th
JGP France			9th
Bavarian Open			6th
Jégvirág Cup			2nd
Nordic Championships			1st
Santa Claus Cup			7th
Tallink Hotels Cup		5th	
Volvo Open Cup		1st	

== Detailed results ==
ISU personal best scores in the +5/-5 GOE System
Segment	Type	Score	Event
Total	TSS	176.96	2023 European Championships
Short program	TSS	62.35	2022 CS Warsaw Cup
Short program	TES	35.69	2022 CS Warsaw Cup
Short program	PCS	27.66	2022 CS Warsaw Cup
Free skating	TSS	116.19	2023 European Championships
Free skating	TES	62.36	2022 Grand Prix of Espoo
Free skating	PCS	57.13	2024 CS Nebelhorn Trophy

=== Senior level ===
Results in the 2022-23 season
Date	Event	SP		FS		Total	
Date	Event	P	Score	P	Score	P	Score
Sep 16–19, 2022	(Italy) 2022 CS Lombardia Trophy	14	43.29	10	93.47	11	136.96
Oct 5–9, 2022	(Finland) 2022 CS Finlandia Trophy	12	53.75	10	103.89	10	157.64
Nov 3–4, 2022	(Latvia) 47th Volvo Open Cup	1	57.15	1	121.57	1	178.72
Nov 17–20, 2022	(Poland) 2022 CS Warsaw Cup	2	62.35	4	112.61	3	174.96
Nov 25–27, 2022	(Finland) 2022 Grand Prix of Espoo	12	42.89	7	111.56	10	154.45
Dec 16–18, 2022	(Finland) 2023 Finnish Championships	1	63.30	1	111.12	1	174.42
Jan 23–29, 2023	(Finland) 2023 European Championships	8	60.77	7	116.19	7	176.96
Feb 2–5, 2023	(Iceland) 2023 Nordic Championships	1	60.98	4	106.92	2	167.90
Feb 23–26, 2023	(Netherlands) 2023 International Challenge Cup	4	62.12	13	96.04	12	158.16
Mar 22–26, 2023	(Japan) 2023 World Championships	21	56.06	21	104.85	21	160.91

Results in the 2023-24 season
Date	Event	SP		FS		Total	
Date	Event	P	Score	P	Score	P	Score
Sep 8–10, 2023	(Italy) 2023 CS Lombardia Trophy	10	53.62	11	91.49	11	145.11
Oct 4-8, 2023	(Finland) 2023 CS Finlandia Trophy	10	53.44	7	106.41	8	159.85
Nov 3-5, 2023	2023 Grand Prix de France	12	39.57	12	86.35	12	125.92
Nov 17-19, 2023	(Finland) 2023 Grand Prix of Espoo	6	58.63	11	95.11	11	153.74
Feb 1-4, 2024	(Sweden) 2024 Nordic Championships	5	48.08	—N/a	—N/a	WD	—N/a

Results in the 2024-25 season
Date	Event	SP		FS		Total	
Date	Event	P	Score	P	Score	P	Score
Sep 19-21, 2024	(Germany) 2024 CS Nebelhorn Trophy	8	57.24	8	111.58	8	168.82
Oct 11-13, 2024	(Hungary) 2024 CS Budapest Trophy	7	57.26	9	95.08	8	152.34
Oct 16-20, 2024	(France) 2024 CS Trophée Métropole Nice Côte d'Azur	4	56.73	4	112.24	4	168.97
Oct 31 - Nov 3, 2024	(Latvia) 2024 Volvo Open Cup	4	53.29	6	87.20	4	140.49
Nov 15-17, 2024	(Finland) 2025 Finnish Championships	9	55.30	11	102.14	10	157.44
Dec 13-15, 2024	(Finland) 2025 Finnish Championships	3	57.38	3	98.58	3	155.96
Jan 16–18, 2025	(Italy) 2025 Winter World University Games	6	55.07	6	108.26	6	163.33
Jan 28 – Feb 2, 2025	(Estonia) 2025 European Championships	18	50.30	18	96.88	18	146.18
Feb 18-20, 2025	(Italy) Road to 26 Trophy	10	46.99	—N/a	—N/a	WD	—N/a

Results in the 2025-26 season
Date	Event	SP		FS		Total	
Date	Event	P	Score	P	Score	P	Score
Nov 5-9, 2025	(Latvia) 2025 Volvo Open Cup	4	52.15	12	77.68	11	129.83
Nov 25-30, 2025	(Estonia) 2025 CS Tallinn Trophy	16	57.18	16	84.52	15	131.70
Dec 12-14, 2025	(Finland) 2026 Finnish Championships	6	52.29	6	86.07	6	138.36

Results in the 2026–27 season
Date	Event	SP		FS		Total	
Date	Event	P	Score	P	Score	P	Score
Nov 6–8, 2026	(Bulgaria) 2026 Denkova-Staviski Cup	7	55.17	5	108.22	6	163.39
Nov 20–22, 2026	(Finland) 2026 Finlandia Trophy	9	57.74	11	96.66	11	156.40

=== Junior level ===
2021–22 season
Date	Event	SP	FS	Total
February 11–13, 2022	2022 Jégvirág Cup	4; 49.29	2; 95.24	2; 144.53
January 18–23, 2022	2022 Bavarian Open	5; 48.56	6; 83.93	6; 132.49
January 27–30, 2022	2022 Nordic Championships	1; 60.57	3; 90.22	1; 150.79
December 6–12, 2021	2021 Santa Claus Cup	12; 47.85	4; 104.25	7; 152.10
October 6–9, 2021	2021 JGP Austria	17; 45.64	9; 102.12	9; 147.76
August 18–21, 2021	2021 JGP France I	6; 53.70	9; 79.95	9; 133.65
2020–21 season
Date	Event	SP	FS	Total
February 18–21, 2021	2021 Tallink Hotels Cup	5; 46.81	3; 89.52	5; 136.33
November 7–8, 2020	2020 Volvo Open Cup	1; 53.46	1; 99.92	1; 153.38
2019–20 season
Date	Event	SP	FS	Total
December 13–15, 2019	2019–20 Finnish Junior Championships	1; 50.16	3; 84.29	3; 134.45
