= Yentl (soundtrack) =

Soundtrack album by Barbra Streisand
- Released: November 8, 1983
- Recorded: 1983
- Genre: Musical
- Length: 45:30
- Label: Columbia
- Producers: Barbra Streisand and Alan and Marilyn Bergman, Dave Grusin, Phil Ramone

Barbra Streisand chronology
Memories (1981)	Yentl (1983)	Emotion (1984)

Alternative cover
- 40th Anniversary edition cover

Singles from Yentl
- 1. "Papa, Can You Hear Me?" Released: January 28, 1984; 2. "The Way He Makes Me Feel" Released: November 5, 1983

Yentl is a soundtrack album to the film of the same name by American singer Barbra Streisand. It was released on November 8, 1983, by Columbia Records. The album was produced by Streisand and Alan and Marilyn Bergman, and arranged and conducted by Michel Legrand. The music is by Legrand and the lyrics by the Bergmans. The album peaked at No. 9 on the Billboard Top 200 LP chart was gold and platinum status on January 9, 1984, by the RIAA for shipping 500,000 and 1 million copies, respectively.

"The Way He Makes Me Feel" was released as the album's lead single reaching number 40 on the Billboard Hot 100 chart and spending two weeks at number one on the adult contemporary chart. "Papa, Can You Hear Me?" was released as a follow-up and became another Top 30 Adult Contemporary Hit. "No Matter What Happens" was released as the second single in the UK.

In 1991, Streisand released three demos from the album sessions on her retrospective box set: Just for the Record including the previously unreleased song "The Moon And I."

According to the liner notes of Just for the Record, the album also received a record certification in France, the Netherlands and Israel. Streisand told Digital Audio & Compact Disc Review magazine, that the album sold more than 3.5 million copies worldwide.

== Track listing ==
All music composed by Michel Legrand; all lyrics by Alan and Marilyn Bergman

1. "Where Is It Written?" – 4:52
2. "Papa, Can You Hear Me?" – 3:29
3. "This Is One of Those Moments" – 4:07
4. "No Wonder" – 2:30
5. "The Way He Makes Me Feel" – 3:44
6. "No Wonder" (Part Two) – 3:19
7. "Tomorrow Night" – 4:43
8. "Will Someone Ever Look at Me That Way?" – 3:03
9. "No Matter What Happens" – 4:03
10. "No Wonder" (Reprise) – 1:05
11. "A Piece of Sky" – 4:19
12. "The Way He Makes Me Feel" (Studio version) – 4:09
13. "No Matter What Happens" (Studio version) – 3:18

A two-disc 40th Anniversary Deluxe Edition of the soundtrack was released on October 27, 2023, with the second disc featuring previously unreleased demos recorded in Streisand's living room accompanied by Legrand on piano.

1. "Where Is It Written? (demo)" – 5:15
2. "Papa, Can You Hear Me? (demo)" – 3:11
3. "The Way He Makes Me Feel (demo)" – 3:34
4. "Several Sins a Day (demo)" – 3:52
5. "No Wonder (demo) with Marilyn Bergman" – 5:33
6. "Tomorrow Night (demo)" – 6:05
7. "Will Someone Ever Look at Me That Way (demo) with Michel Legrand vocals" – 3:31
8. "The Moon and I (demo)" – 4:29
9. "A Piece of Sky (demo)" – 4:31
10. "Papa, Can You Hear Me? (Studio version)" – 3:34
11. "Several Sins a Day (Orchestrated version)" – 3:09
12. "Where Is It Written? (with Rabbinical Choir)" – 2:35
13. "Papa, Can You Hear Me? (Single version)" – 3:00
14. "This Is One of Those Moments (Reprise)" – 1:19
15. "End Title (Instrumental Medley)" – 5:14

== Charts ==
=== Weekly charts ===
Chart (1983/84)	Peak position
Australia (Kent Music Report)	24
Austrian Albums (Ö3 Austria)	7
Canada Top Albums/CDs (RPM)	16
Dutch Albums (MegaCharts)	6
Finnish Albums (Suomen virallinen lista)	14
German Albums (Offizielle Top 100)	26
Spanish Albums (PROMUSICAE)	2
Swedish Albums (Sverigetopplistan)	29
Swiss Albums (Schweizer Hitparade)	4
UK Albums (OCC)	21
US Billboard 200	9

=== Year-end charts ===
Chart (1983)	Position
US Cash Box	89

Chart (1984)	Position
Canadian Albums (RPM)	91
Dutch Albums (MegaCharts)	40
Swiss Albums (Schweizer Hitparade)	14
US Cash Box	47

== Certifications and sales ==
Certifications and sales for Yentl
Region	Certification	Certified units/sales
Australia (ARIA)	Gold	35,000^{‡}
Austria (IFPI Austria)	Gold	25,000^{*}
Canada (Music Canada)	Platinum	100,000^{^}
France (SNEP)	Gold	100,000^{*}
United Kingdom (BPI)	Gold	100,000^{^}
United States (RIAA)	Platinum	1,000,000^{^}
Summaries
Worldwide	—	3,500,000
^{*} Sales figures based on certification alone.^{^} Shipments figures based on certification alone.^{‡} Sales+streaming figures based on certification alone.
