= Make No Mistake, He's Mine =

1984 single by Kim Carnes and Barbra Streisand

Single by Kim Carnes and Barbra Streisand

from the album Emotion
- B-side: "Clear Sailing" (Streisand)
- Released: December 1984
- Recorded: June 21, 1984
- Studio: Record One (Sherman Oaks, CA); Ocean Way Recording (Los Angeles, CA)
- Genre: Pop
- Length: 4:10
- Label: Columbia
- Songwriter: Kim Carnes
- Producers: Bill Cuomo, Kim Carnes

Kim Carnes singles chronology
"I Pretend" (1984)	"Make No Mistake, He's Mine" (1984)	"Invitation to Dance" (1985)

Barbra Streisand singles chronology
"Left in the Dark" (1984)	"Make No Mistake, He's Mine" (1984)	"Emotion" (1985)

"Make No Mistake, He's Mine" is a song written by Kim Carnes, recorded as a duet with Barbra Streisand in 1984. The duet was subsequently recorded as "Make No Mistake, She's Mine" by Ronnie Milsap and Kenny Rogers in 1987. Both versions of the song charted.

In the wake of the 2013 Glee cover, where a man and woman sing about a female lover, Carnes welcomed having "three different meanings of the song", regarding the malleability of the piece as "rewarding and gratifying".

== Barbra Streisand and Kim Carnes version ==
Recorded by Streisand and Carnes, co-produced (with Bill Cuomo) by Carnes, the duet first appeared on Streisand's 1984 album Emotion. Released as a single in December 1984, the record hit #8 on the Adult Contemporary chart and #51 on the Billboard Hot 100 in early 1985.

In 1985 Carnes become the first artist to appear on the Billboard charts as part of a solo ("Invitation To Dance"), duet ("Make No Mistake, He's Mine"), and trio ("What About Me?") at the same time.

"Make No Mistake" subsequently appeared on compilation albums by the two artists, including the 1993 Carnes release Gypsy Honeymoon and the 2002 Streisand release Duets.

A solo rendition by Carnes surfaced as a bonus track on the 2001 CD reissue of her 1985 album Barking at Airplanes.

=== Critical reception ===
Billboard said Streisand was "wonderfully feisty" in the duet. Other outlets at the time compared the "lovely song" to "The Girl Is Mine", given the common theme of possessiveness between rivals. A decade later Streisand and Carnes were praised for "brilliant vocal performances" that sounded as contemporary in 1993 as they did in 1984.

=== Charts ===
Chart (1984–1985)	Peak position
Canadian RPM Top Singles	89
Canadian RPM Adult Contemporary	7
Spain Top 40 Radio	38
UK Singles (Official Charts)	92
US Billboard Hot 100	51
US Adult Contemporary (Billboard)	8
US Cash Box Top 100 Singles	42

== Ronnie Milsap and Kenny Rogers version ==
"Make No Mistake, She's Mine"

Single by Ronnie Milsap and Kenny Rogers

from the album Heart and Soul (Ronnie Milsap) and I Prefer the Moonlight (Kenny Rogers)
- B-side: "You're My Love (Rogers)"
- Released: June 1987
- Recorded: May 1987
- Genre: Country, pop
- Length: 3:03
- Label: RCA Victor
- Songwriter: Kim Carnes
- Producers: Rob Galbraith, Kyle Lehning

Ronnie Milsap singles chronology
"Snap Your Fingers" (1987)	"Make No Mistake, She's Mine" (1987)	"Where Do the Nights Go" (1987)

Kenny Rogers singles chronology
"Twenty Years Ago" (1987)	"Make No Mistake, She's Mine" (1987)	"I Prefer the Moonlight" (1987)

"Make No Mistake, She's Mine" was recorded as a duet single by country pop artists Ronnie Milsap and Kenny Rogers in 1987.

The song topped the Billboard country chart and peaked at No. 42 on the Adult Contemporary chart. The song was later included on Ronnie Milsap's Heart and Soul and Kenny Rogers' I Prefer the Moonlight.

The song won a Grammy award for Best Country Collaboration with Vocals.

=== Charts ===
Chart (1987)	Peak position
U.S. Billboard Hot Country Singles	1
US Adult Contemporary (Billboard)	42
Canadian RPM Country Tracks	1

== In popular culture ==
- In 2013 Naya Rivera and Chord Overstreet sang the "She's Mine" version for the "Diva" episode of the television series Glee.
