= Emotion (Barbra Streisand song) =

Single by Barbra Streisand

from the album Emotion
- B-side: "Here We Are at Last"
- Released: 1985
- Recorded: June 24, 1985
- Studio: Studio 55 (Los Angeles, CA)
- Genre: Pop
- Length: 4:58
- Label: Columbia
- Songwriter: Peter Bliss
- Producer: Richard Perry

Barbra Streisand singles chronology
"Make No Mistake, He's Mine" (1984)	"Emotion" (1985)	"Somewhere" (1985)

Music video
- "Emotion" on YouTube

"Emotion" is a song recorded by American singer Barbra Streisand for her 1984 album of the same name.

== Overview ==
The song was written by Peter Bliss, and the producer was Richard Perry, who had previously worked with the singer on albums by Stoney End and Barbra Joan Streisand.

The song was released as the third and final single from the album in 1985. It did not become commercially successful on the Billboard Hot 100 chart, debuting at 81 positions and dropping out two weeks later. Nevertheless, it reached 14th place on the Adult Contemporary chart, and the song also entered the top 20 on the similar Canadian RPM chart.

Billboard reviewer Paul Grein noted that even Richard Perry couldn't help Streisand get another hit. He also agreed with a letter from one of the listeners from New York that radio stations deliberately ignore the singer's new singles, saying that if these songs were recorded by Madonna or Cyndi Lauper, radio stations would play them over and over again."

A video clip was shot for the song by director Richard Baskin.

== Track listing ==
7" single
A1. "Emotion" – 4:07
B1. "Here We Are at Last" – 3:18

12" single
A1. "Emotion" (vocal version) – 6:34
B1. "Emotion" (instrumental version) – 4:44

== Charts ==
Chart performance for "Emotion"
Chart (1985)	Peak position
Canada Top Singles (RPM)	97
Canada Adult Contemporary (RPM)	18
US Billboard Hot 100	79
US Adult Contemporary (Billboard)	14
US Top 100 Singles (Cash Box)	79
