= Misha Mitrofanov =

American pair skater (born 1997)

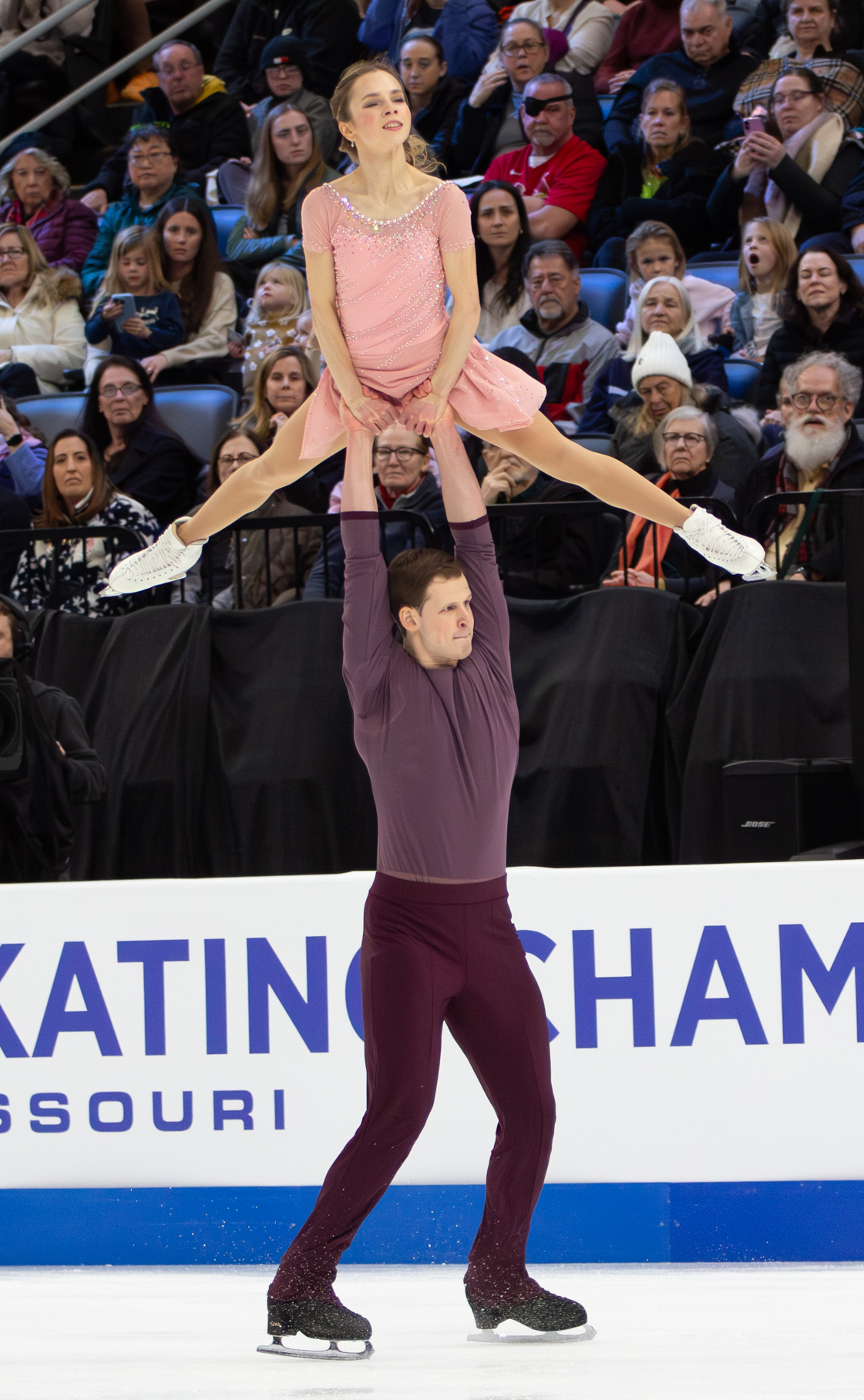
- Alisa Efimova and Misha Mitrofanov at the 2026 U.S. Championships

Personal information
- Born: June 12, 1997 (age 29) Madison, Wisconsin, U.S.
- Home town: Plano, Texas, U.S.
- Height: 6 ft 1 in (1.85 m)

Figure skating career
- Country: United States
- Discipline: Pair skating
- Partner: Alisa Efimova (since 2023); Audrey Lu (2016–22)
- Coach: Olga Ganicheva; Alexei Letov
- Skating club: Dallas Figure Skating Club, Plano
- Began skating: 2001

Medal record
Four Continents Championships
Gold medal – first place	2022 Tallinn	Pairs
Gold medal – first place	2026 Beijing	Pairs
U.S. Championships
Gold medal – first place	2025 Wichita	Pairs
Gold medal – first place	2026 St. Louis	Pairs
Silver medal – second place	2024 Columbus	Pairs
Bronze medal – third place	2022 Nashville	Pairs
World Team Trophy
Gold medal – first place	2025 Tokyo	Team

Misha Mitrofanov (born June 12, 1997) is an American pair skater. With his current partner and wife, Alisa Efimova, he is the 2026 Four Continents champion, a two-time U.S. national champion (2025–26), a four-time Grand Prix medalist, and a three-time Challenger Series medalist.

With his former skating partner, Audrey Lu, he is the 2022 Four Continents champion, 2021 Golden Spin of Zagreb champion, 2018 U.S. International Classic silver medalist, and 2022 U.S. national bronze medalist.

== Personal life ==
Mitrofanov was born on June 12, 1997, in Madison, Wisconsin. He is the eldest of two children born to Yelena, a real estate agent, and Gennadiy, a natural gas and oil marketer. He has a sister, Nina. After graduating (in May 2016) from Spring Creek Academy in Plano, Texas, he began studying sports medicine at the University of Texas at Dallas. He earned a bachelor's degree in healthcare studies in 2023. Mitrofanov has expressed interest in opening his own mechanic shop after finishing his competitive figure skating career.

He married his pair skating partner, Alisa Efimova, in February 2024.

== Career ==
=== Early years ===
Mitrofanov began learning to skate in 2001 at the age of four after doctors encouraged his parents to enter him into sports as a way to improve the weak immune system he had been born with. He was coached by Alexei Mantsorov from 2005 to 2014. Skating in the novice pairs' category, he placed 8th at the 2015 U.S. Championships with Emily Chan, and 6th at the 2016 U.S. Championships with Ashlee Raymond.

=== Partnership with Lu ===
==== 2016–17 season: Debut of Lu/Mitrofanov ====
Mitrofanov teamed up with Audrey Lu in May 2016. Making their international debut, the pair placed twelfth at an ISU Junior Grand Prix (JGP) event in the Czech Republic in September 2016. Their season came to an end in November, after Mitrofanov dislocated his shoulder at the Midwestern Sectional Championships. He underwent shoulder surgery and resumed training after six months.

==== 2017–18 season: U.S. Junior national champion ====
Lu/Mitrofanov placed fifth at both of their JGP assignments. In January, they won the junior pairs' title at the 2018 U.S. Championships; they ranked first in both segments and outscored the silver medalists by 17.74 points. In March, the pair placed fifth (sixth in the short program, fourth in the free skate) at the 2018 World Junior Championships in Sofia, Bulgaria.

==== 2018–19 season: Senior international debut ====
Making their senior international debut, Lu/Mitrofanov won silver at the 2018 CS U.S. International Classic in mid-September, and then placed fifth at the 2018 CS Nebelhorn Trophy. They were invited to two Grand Prix events, the 2018 NHK Trophy and 2018 Internationaux de France, where they placed seventh and sixth, respectively. Debuting at senior Nationals at the 2019 U.S. Championships, they placed sixth.

==== 2019–20 season ====
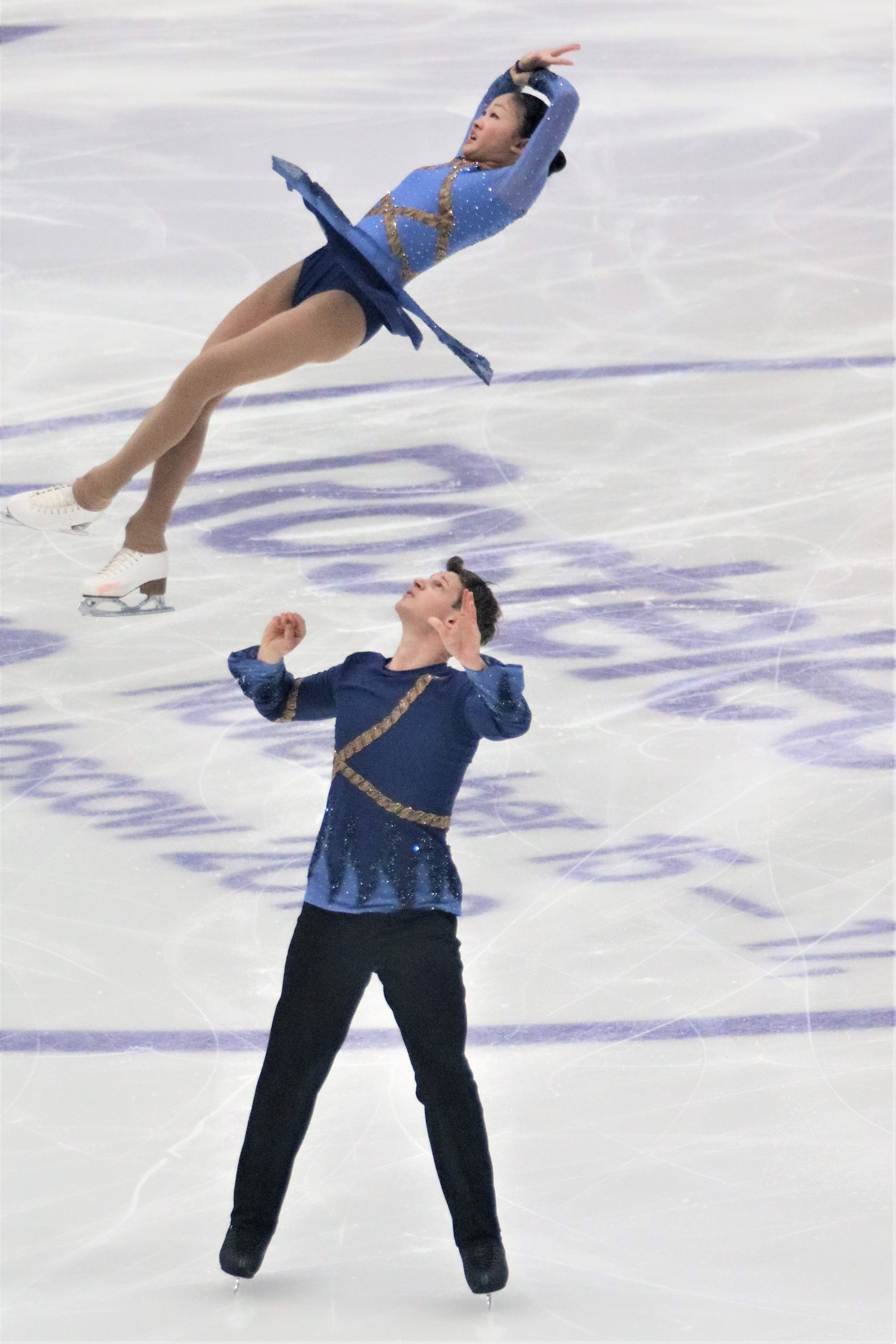
Lu and Mitrofanov performing a twist lift at the 2019 Rostelecom Cup

Lu/Mitrofanov began the season with a fifth-place finish at the 2019 CS U.S. Classic. On the Grand Prix, they were eighth at the 2019 Rostelecom Cup. They concluded the season at the 2020 U.S. Championships, where they finished sixth.

==== 2020–21 season: First Grand Prix medal ====
With the COVID-19 pandemic affecting international travel, Lu/Mitrofanov were assigned to attend the 2020 Skate America, the Grand Prix having been arranged primarily based on training location. They placed third in the short program, 3.31 points ahead of national pewter medalists Cain-Gribble/LeDuc. Coming fourth in the free skate, their lead from the short program was nevertheless enough to remain in third place overall, winning the bronze medal.

Competing at the 2021 U.S. Championships, Lu/Mitrofanov placed third in the short program with a clean skate. They were fourth in the free skate, dropping to fourth place overall and winning the pewter medal.

==== 2021–22 season: Four Continents champion ====
After beginning the season with some minor America competitions, Lu/Mitrofanov competed on the Grand Prix at the 2021 NHK Trophy, finishing in fifth place. They went on to finish in fourth at the 2021 Rostelecom Cup, after which Lu said they were "satisfied" with the results on the Grand Prix that year. They next competed at the 2021 CS Golden Spin of Zagreb, where they won the gold medal, their first Challenger title.

Lu/Mitrofanov won the bronze medal at the 2022 U.S. Championships. Mitrofanov said they were "very happy and grateful" for the event and its large audience. As a result of their placement, they were assigned to compete at the 2022 Four Continents Championships in Tallinn, and named second alternates to the American Olympic team. Lu/Mitrofanov won both segments of the Four Continents competition to take the gold medal. They parted ways following the season due to Lu deciding to prioritize attending university.

Mitrofanov briefly skated with Hazel Collier for the ice show An Evening with Champions.

=== Partnership with Efimova ===
==== 2023–24 season: Debut of Efimova/Mitrofanov ====
Upon learning about her split with previous partner Ruben Blommaert, Mitrofanov messaged Finnish-Russian pair skater Alisa Efimova on Instagram, asking if she would be interested in having a pair skating tryout with him. Efimova went on to contact Mitrofanov's longtime coaches, Aleksey Letov and Olga Ganicheva, asking if they would be interested in coaching her, to which they agreed. Following a successful tryout, Efimova moved to Norwood, Massachusetts, to train at the Skating Club of Boston with Mitrofanov. Mitrofanov later recalled, "There were some elements where we had different timing. But on other elements, it clicked almost right away, and it felt very nice. It just felt like [being] at home." It was announced in June 2023 that the pair team would represent the United States.

Following a silver medal win at the domestic U.S. Pairs Final, Efimova and Mitrofanov qualified for the 2024 U.S. National Championships. At the event, the pair placed fifth in the short program, but won the free skate, allowing them to move up to second place overall. “It felt really nice because our hard work was paying off,” Mitrofanov said about the free skate win.

==== 2024–25 season: First U.S. national title and Grand Prix bronze ====
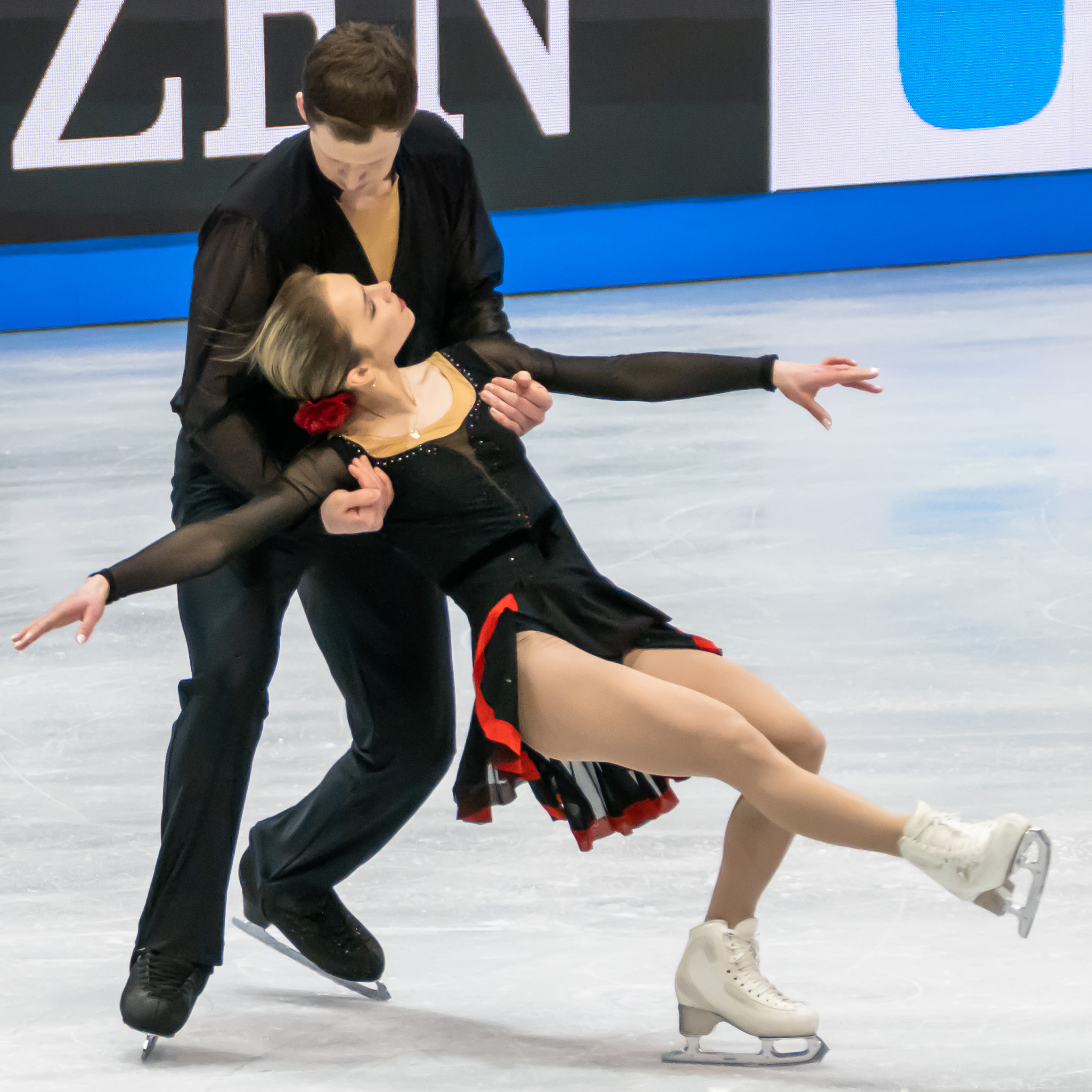
Efimova and Mitrofanov performing their short program at the 2025 World Championships

Efimova and Mitrofanov began their season by competing on the 2024–25 ISU Challenger Series. They won the silver medal at the 2024 CS John Nicks Pairs Competition before going on to finish fourth at the 2024 CS Nebelhorn Trophy.

Debuting together on the 2024–25 Grand Prix series, the pair won the bronze medal at 2024 Skate America. “Our main goal of the season is to make the World team,” said Mitrofanov. “Therefore, we need to place in the top two at nationals and show good performances.” They went on to finish fourth at the 2024 Grand Prix de France. “We were happy that we got this opportunity to skate at two Grand Prix events and even medal at Skate America," said Efimova. "That was for sure a highlight for us.”

In January, Efimova/Mitrofanov competed at the 2025 U.S. Championships. They placed third in the short program after receiving a double downgrade on their attempted side-by-side triple toe-loops. They skated a clean free skate, however, winning that competition segment and winning the gold medal overall. Efimova expressed joy at the result in an interview following the event, saying, "For us, this is the second Nationals, and I’m very proud of us that we made it to the top of the podium [...] And for me, this is the first Nationals overall in any country that I placed first. It was my dream right now to do it for our team, our community. They do so much for us, our coaches, our parents, our skating club and everyone. I’m just really happy that it turned out this way."

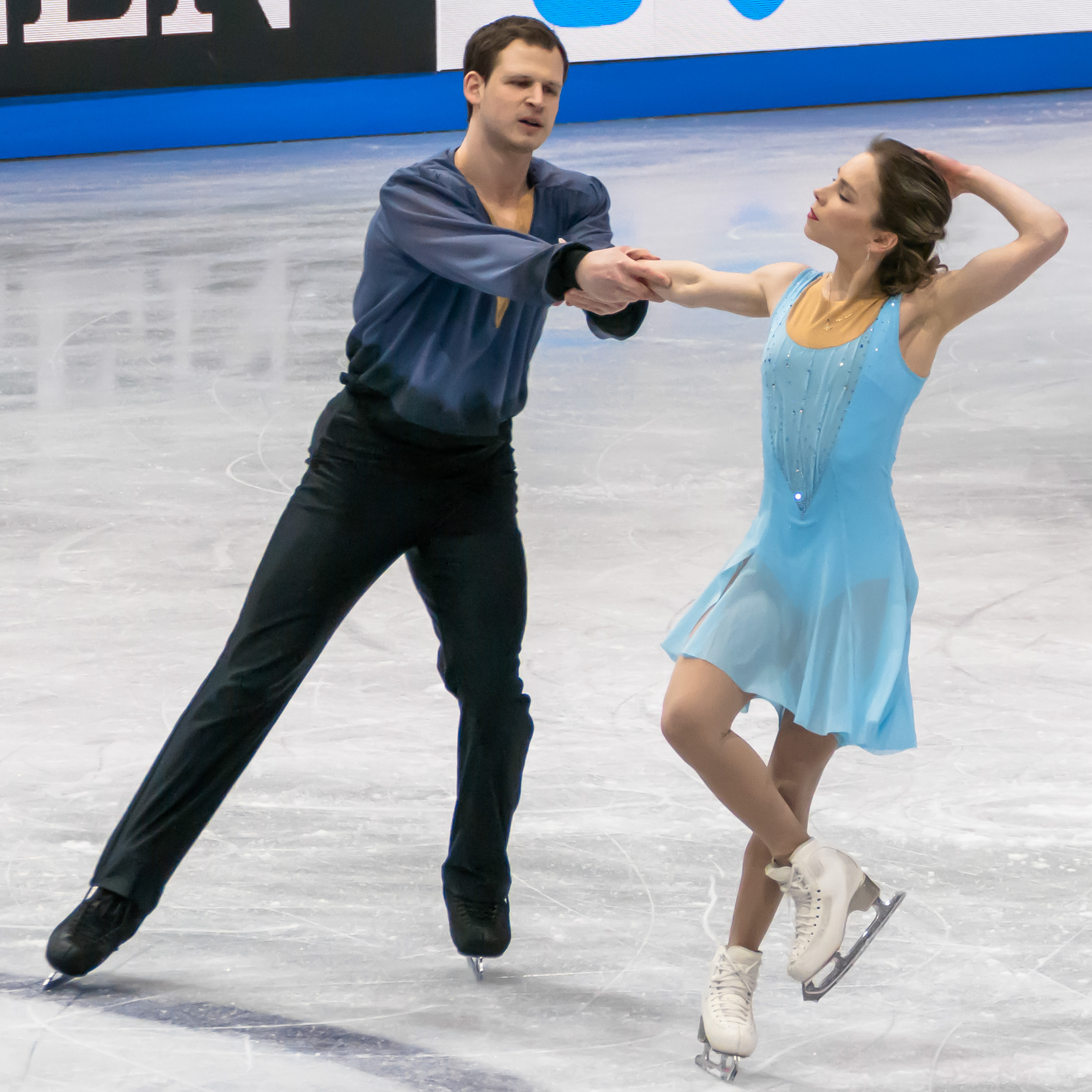
Efimova and Mitrofanov performing their free skate at the 2025 World Championships

A few days following the pair's win, however, eleven skaters and four figure skating coaches were killed in the Potomac River mid-air collision. Four of the victims were members of the Skating Club of Boston, where Efimova/Mitrofanov train. Speaking on the tragedy, Mitrofanov shared, "It was very difficult. That goes without saying. For the club members that were directly supported, I mean, directly involved in it, I think there were words indescribable for truly what happened. We all came together, and we supported each other, and we wanted to support them as much as we can. We took it day by day and we gave all the love that we had for one another."

Efimova/Mitrofanov went on to compete at the 2025 Four Continents Championships in Seoul, South Korea, where they finished in fifth place. “We’ve been practicing, and Alisa has been nailing the jumps in practices,” said Mitrofanov after the free skate. “Ice is slippery, but I’m really proud of Alisa. We didn’t give up, especially after the mistake that we had. We were able to collect ourselves immediately and continue the program, so I’m very proud of us for that.”

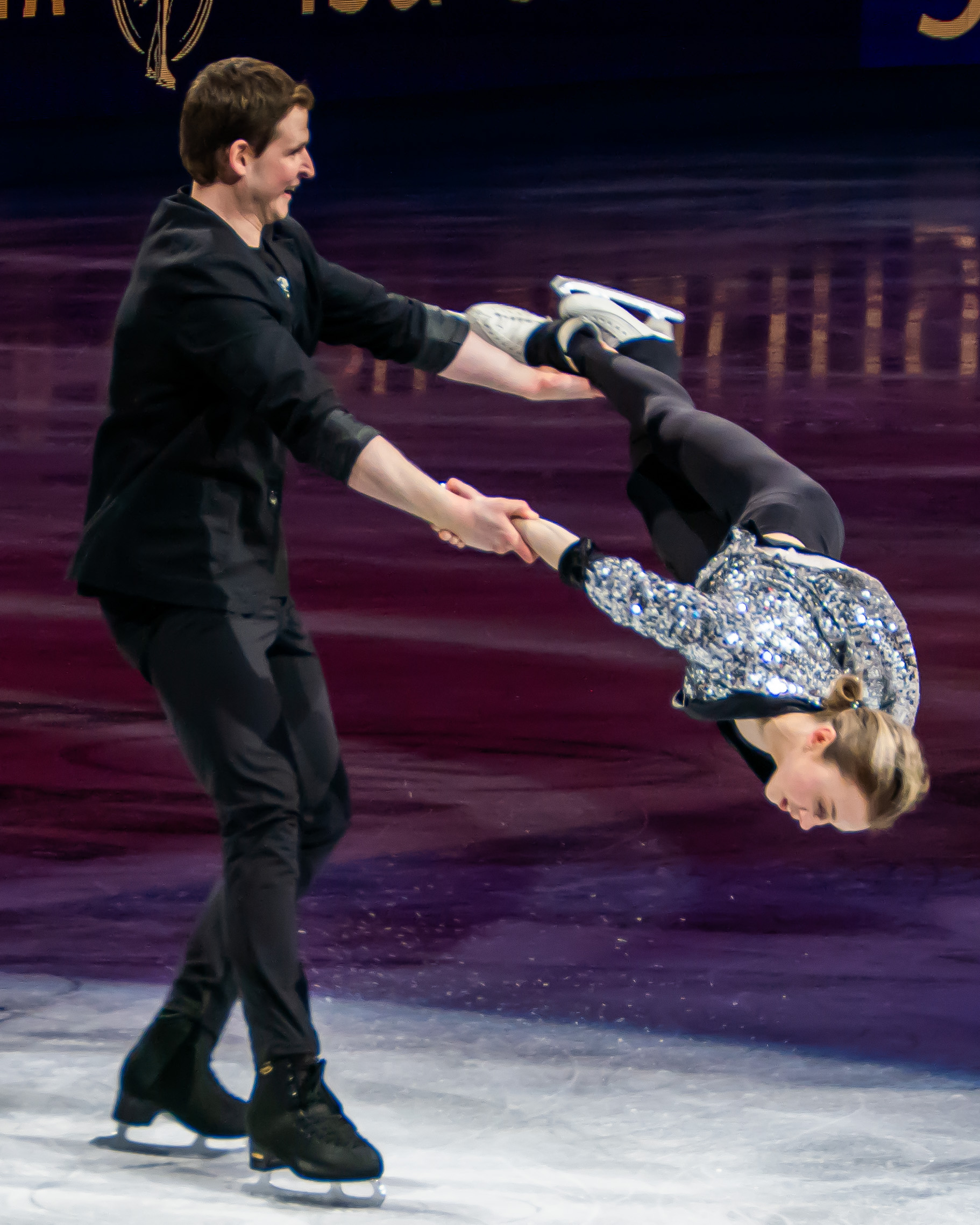
Efimova and Mitrofanov performing their exhibition program at the 2025 World Championships

On March 2, 2025, the pair took part in Legacy on Ice, an ice show organized by U.S. Figure Skating that paid tribute to lives lost aboard American Eagle Flight 5342. A couple weeks later, they competed at the 2025 World Championships in Boston, Massachusetts, United States. After, placing ninth in the short program, the pair delivered a clean free skate, placing fourth in that segment and earning a new personal best in the process. They ultimately finished the event in sixth place overall. Their placement, in addition to Kam/O'Shea's seventh-place finish, earned two berths for U.S. pair skating at the 2026 Winter Olympics. Speaking on the experience of skating at Worlds in his hometown, Mitrofanov shared, "It was absolutely unbelievable! To have Worlds in Boston, it was everything I could hope and dream for. We had that slight extra pressure, you know, like, this is home, this is worlds. So, you really want to do well. But to be honest, the support from the crowd was absolutely amazing. That’s what really helped."

The two were chosen to represent the US in the 2025 World Team Trophy where they secured fifth position in the pairs' category. Team United States emerged first in the general ranking. Commenting on the tournament, Efimova said she was grateful for the spirit of teamwork and the comradeship that prevailed during team practices and national tournaments.

==== 2025–26 season: Second Four Continents gold and Grand Prix silver ====
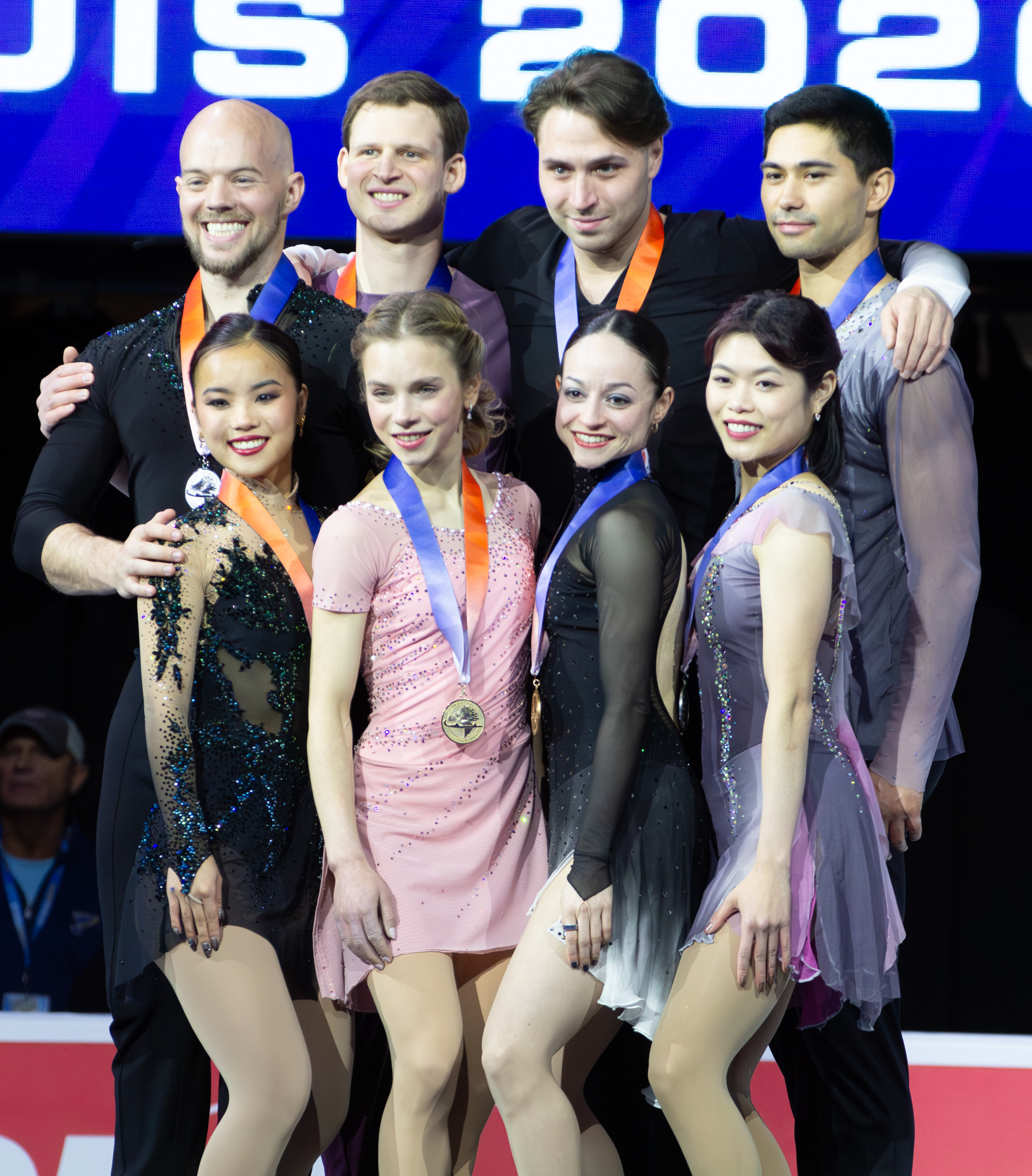
Efimova and Mitrofanov (center left) during the medal ceremony at the 2026 U.S. Championships

Going into the season, Efimova/Mitrofanov worked with choreographer, Renée Roca, to create a free program to the music of Love Story in tribute to two-time Olympic gold medal winning pair team, Gordeeva/Grinkov. Gordeeva, herself, also assisted in the program's creation.

They opened the season in August at 2025 CS John Nicks International Pairs Competition where they took silver, and followed up with a bronze medal at 2025 CS Nebelhorn Trophy. A couple months later, Efimova/Mitrofanov placed fifth at 2025 NHK Trophy and followed up with a silver medal at 2025 Finlandia Trophy. "It feels amazing! It is great that we beat the 200-mark today," said Efimova after the free skate. "We are happy with today, happy with all the work that we have put in."

In January, Efimova/Mitrofanov competed at the 2026 U.S. Championships, winning the national title for a second consecutive time. "We use this as a learning lesson going forward for the other competitions that will also have high pressure," said Mitrofanov after the event. "And so, for us, this is like a learning lesson to understand what to do next." Due to Efimova not yet having an American citizenship, the pair were not eligible for the 2026 Winter Olympic team. They were instead named to the 2026 Four Continents team and the 2026 World team.

Less than two weeks later, Efimova/Mitrofanov competed at the 2026 Four Continents Championships. They placed third in the short program and won the free skate, winning the gold medal overall. "This is my first gold medal in Four Continents championships, and I'm happy to win it with Misha," said Efimova. "I am proud of us. But overall, the athletic career and life is a long path; we just keep on moving forward."

At the 2026 World Championships, the pair finished in 6th place.

==== 2026–27 season: Two Grand Prix medals ====
Efimova/Mitrofanov opened their season on the Grand Prix series at the 2026 Skate Canada International, where they placed second overall and won the silver medal. “Overall, considering we had much less time to prepare for this Grand Prix, I think we skated with what we could today,” said Efimova. “Obviously, we know there’s a lot of things to skate in, but still, I’m happy that we were able to keep up the full package within the program.”

Two weeks later, they competed at 2026 Skate America, placing second for another silver and qualifying for the 2026–27 Grand Prix of Figure Skating Final, the first Grand Prix final of their careers. “We’re very happy that we were able to place at the second Grand Prix, because this is the first time that we were able to place at both of the events,” said Efimova. “I’m not satisfied with my skate today, but I feel like it’s now giving me a lot of fire and motivation to work, and I hope that for the next events it will be improved.”

== Programs ==
=== Pair skating with Alisa Efimova ===
Season	Short program	Free skating	Exhibition
2023–24	Vladimir's Blues by Max Richter; Tourner dans le vide by Indila choreo. by Olga Ganicheva	Iron 2021 by Woodkid choreo. by Olga Ganicheva	
2024–25	Ameksa (District 78 Remix) by Taalbi Brothers & District 78; Uccen (DWTS Remix) by Taalbi Brothers choreo. by Renée Roca	Je suis malade by Serge Lama performed by Forestella choreo. by Renée Roca	Money, Money, Money by ABBA; Papa, Can You Hear Me? (from Yentl) by Michel Legrand performed by Barbra Streisand
2025–26	Reel Around the Sun (from Riverdance) by Bill Whelan choreo. by Renée Roca; Cloak and Dagger by Eternal Eclipse choreo. by Renée Roca	Where Do I Begin? (from Love Story) by Francis Lai performed by Gary Valenciano; Our Moving Story by Karl Hugo choreo. by Renée Roca	Ameksa (District 78 Remix) by Taalbi Brothers & District 78; Uccen (DWTS Remix) by Taalbi Brothers choreo. by Renée Roca

=== Pair skating with Audrey Lu ===
Season	Short program	Free skating	Exhibition
2016–17	O Fortuna (from Carmina Burana) by Carl Orff	Memory (from Cats); The Music of the Night (from The Phantom of the Opera) by Andrew Lloyd Webber	
2017–18	Once Upon a December (from Anastasia) by Deana Carter	Memory (from Cats); The Music of the Night (from The Phantom of the Opera) by Andrew Lloyd Webber	The Prayer by Celine Dion and Andrea Bocelli
2018–19	Masquerade: Waltz by Aram Khachaturian	El Tango de Roxanne; Come What May (from Moulin Rouge!)	
2019–20	Skyfall by Adele	Notre-Dame de Paris by Riccardo Cocciante, Luc Plamondon, Will Jennings	
2020–21	The Show Must Go On (from Moulin Rouge!)	Charlie Chaplin medley	
2021–22	Toxic; Survivor by 2WEI	Ancient Lands by Ronan Hardiman; In Too Deep; Illusions by Thomas Bergersen	

== Competitive highlights ==
- GP – Event of the ISU Grand Prix Series
- JGP – Event of the ISU Junior Grand Prix Series
- CS – Event of the ISU Challenger Series
- TBD – Assigned
- WD – Withdrew from competition

=== Pair skating with Alisa Efimova ===
Competition placements at senior level
Season	2023–24	2024–25	2025–26	2026–27
World Championships		6th	6th	
Four Continents Championships		5th	1st	
U.S. Championships	2nd	1st	1st	
World Team Trophy		1st (5th)		
Grand Prix Final				TBD
GP France		4th		
GP NHK Trophy			5th	
GP Skate America		3rd		2nd
GP Skate Canada International				2nd
GP Finland			2nd	
CS Nebelhorn Trophy		4th	3rd	
CS John Nicks Pairs		2nd	2nd	

=== Pair skating with Audrey Lu ===
Competition placements at senior level
Season	2018–19	2019–20	2020–21	2021–22
Four Continents Championships				1st
U.S. Championships	6th	6th	4th	3rd
GP France	6th			
GP NHK Trophy	7th			5th
GP Rostelecom Cup		8th		4th
GP Skate America			3rd	
CS Golden Spin of Zagreb				1st
CS Nebelhorn Trophy	5th			
CS U.S. Classic	2nd	5th		
Challenge Cup		2nd		
Cranberry Cup				6th
John Nicks Pairs				3rd

Competition placements at junior level
Season	2016–17	2017–18
World Junior Championships		5th
U.S. Championships		1st
JGP Belarus		5th
JGP Czech Republic	12th	
JGP Poland		5th

== Detailed results ==
=== Pair skating with Alisa Efimova ===
ISU personal best scores in the +5/-5 GOE System
Segment	Type	Score	Event
Total	TSS	205.49	2025 Finlandia Trophy
Short program	TSS	71.85	2026 Four Continents Championships, 2026 Skate America
Short program	TES	39.93	2026 Skate America
Short program	PCS	32.15	2026 Four Continents Championships
Free skating	TSS	135.59	2025 World Championships
Free skating	TES	70.76	2025 World Championships
Free skating	PCS	66.29	2025 Finlandia Trophy

Results in the 2023–24 season
Date	Event	SP		FS		Total	
Date	Event	P	Score	P	Score	P	Score
Jan 22–28, 2024	(United States) 2024 U.S. Championships	5	60.48	1	126.43	2	186.91

Results in the 2024–25 season
Date	Event	SP		FS		Total	
Date	Event	P	Score	P	Score	P	Score
Sep 3–4, 2024	(United States) 2024 CS John Nicks Pairs Competition	4	63.44	1	125.44	2	188.88
Sep 18–21, 2024	(Germany) 2024 CS Nebelhorn Trophy	4	65.03	6	113.00	4	178.03
Oct 18–20, 2024	(United States) 2024 Skate America	5	63.05	3	128.46	3	191.51
Oct 31 – Nov 3, 2024	2024 Grand Prix de France	4	64.08	4	107.84	4	171.92
Jan 20–26, 2025	(United States) 2025 U.S. Championships	3	69.03	1	142.87	1	211.90
Feb 19–23, 2025	(South Korea) 2025 Four Continents Championships	5	67.59	5	124.48	5	192.07
Mar 25–30, 2025	(United States) 2025 World Championships	9	63.70	4	135.59	6	199.29
Apr 17–20, 2025	(Japan) 2025 World Team Trophy	5	64.57	5	117.67	1 (5)	182.24

Results in the 2025–26 season
Date	Event	SP		FS		Total	
Date	Event	P	Score	P	Score	P	Score
Sep 2–3, 2025	(United States) 2025 CS John Nicks International Pairs Competition	2	66.85	2	126.69	2	193.54
Sep 25–27, 2025	(Germany) 2025 CS Nebelhorn Trophy	3	67.42	3	126.37	3	193.79
Nov 7–9, 2025	(Japan) 2025 NHK Trophy	5	69.21	5	123.79	5	193.00
Nov 21–23, 2025	(Finland) 2025 Finlandia Trophy	3	70.19	2	135.30	2	205.49
Jan 4–11, 2026	(United States) 2026 U.S. Championships	1	75.31	1	132.40	1	207.71
Jan 21–25, 2026	(China) 2026 Four Continents Championships	3	71.85	1	133.49	1	205.34
Mar 24–29, 2026	(Czech Republic) 2026 World Championships	7	67.29	5	135.22	6	202.51

Results in the 2026–27 season
Date	Event	SP		FS		Total	
Date	Event	P	Score	P	Score	P	Score
Oct 30 – Nov 1, 2026	2026 Skate Canada International	2	70.32	3	121.58	2	191.90
Nov 13–15, 2026	(United States) 2026 Skate America	2	71.85	2	119.94	2	191.79

=== Pair skating with Audrey Lu ===
==== Senior level ====
2018–2019 season
Date	Event	SP	FS	Total
January 19–27, 2019	2019 U.S. Championships	5; 66.21	6; 116.21	6; 182.42
November 23–25, 2019	2018 Internationaux de France	6; 56.71	7; 100.57	6; 157.28
November 9–11, 2018	2018 NHK Trophy	7; 52.35	7; 96.90	7; 149.25
September 26–29, 2018	2018 CS Nebelhorn Trophy	6; 49.47	4; 107.75	5; 157.22
September 12–16, 2018	2018 CS U.S. Classic	2; 57.25	2; 86.68	2; 143.93
2019–2020 season
Date	Event	SP	FS	Total
February 20–23, 2020	2020 International Challenge Cup	2; 62.94	2; 110.54	2; 173.48
January 20–26, 2020	2020 U.S. Championships	5; 65.06	6; 116.43	6; 181.49
November 15–17, 2019	2019 Rostelecom Cup	8; 54.03	8; 99.58	8; 153.61
September 17–22, 2019	2019 CS U.S. Classic	5; 63.87	5; 104.63	5; 168.50
2020–2021 season
Date	Event	SP	FS	Total
January 11–21, 2021	2021 U.S. Championships	3; 69.56	4; 128.41	4; 197.97
October 23–24, 2020	2020 Skate America	3; 67.52	4; 122.13	3; 189.65
2021–2022 season
Date	Event	SP	FS	Total
January 18–23, 2022	2022 Four Continents Championships	1; 68.35	1; 120.75	1; 189.10
January 3–9, 2022	2022 U.S. Championships	3; 68.11	3; 123.43	3; 191.54
December 7–11, 2021	2021 CS Golden Spin of Zagreb	3; 66.41	2; 128.91	1; 195.32
November 12–14, 2021	2021 NHK Trophy	5; 64.95	5; 125.08	5; 190.03
November 26–28, 2021	2021 Rostelecom Cup	4; 64.97	4; 121.19	4; 186.16
September 9–10, 2021	2021 John Nicks Pairs Challenge	4; 66.16	3; 129.04	3; 195.20
August 11–15, 2021	2021 Cranberry Cup International	5; 60.75	9; 98.06	6; 158.81

==== Junior level ====
2016–2017 season
Date	Event	SP	FS	Total
August 31–September 3, 2016	2016 JGP Czech Republic	12; 44.71	12; 78.48	12; 123.19
2017–2018 season
Date	Event	SP	FS	Total
March 5–11, 2018	2018 World Junior Championships	6; 54.38	4; 105.71	5; 160.09
December 29–January 8, 2018	2018 U.S. Junior Championships	1; 60.80	1; 112.51	1; 173.31
October 4–7, 2017	2017 JGP Poland	6; 51.53	5; 99.12	5; 150.65
September 20–23, 2017	2017 JGP Belarus	4; 52.94	6; 79.19	5; 132.13
