= The Way He Makes Me Feel =

"The Way He Makes Me Feel (Studio Version)"

Single by Barbra Streisand

from the album Yentl (soundtrack)
- B-side: "The Way He Makes Me Feel (Original Version)"
- Released: November 5, 1983
- Studio: A&M (Hollywood, California)
- Genre: Pop
- Length: 3:44
- Label: Columbia
- Songwriters: Alan Bergman, Marilyn Bergman (words), Michel Legrand (music)
- Producers: Phil Ramone, Dave Grusin

Barbra Streisand singles chronology
"Memory" (1982)	"The Way He Makes Me Feel (Studio Version)" (1983)	"Papa, Can You Hear Me?" (1984)

Audio
- "The Way He Makes Me Feel (Studio Version)" on YouTube

"The Way He Makes Me Feel" is a popular song from 1983 performed by Barbra Streisand. The song is featured in the film adaptation of the play Yentl, in which Streisand starred and sang most of the music. The lyrics were written by Alan and Marilyn Bergman, with music by Michel Legrand.

== Accolades ==
Along with another song from Yentl ("Papa, Can You Hear Me?"), "The Way He Makes Me Feel" was nominated for an Academy Award in the category Best Original Song. Both tunes lost the Oscar to "Flashdance...What a Feeling". Jennifer Holliday performed the song at the ceremony.

== Weekly charts ==
"The Way He Makes Me Feel" was released as a single in a slightly different and more contemporary version than the one on the soundtrack to the film. It reached number 40 on the Billboard Hot 100 chart and spent two weeks at number one on the adult contemporary chart. This was Streisand's eighth (and, to date, final) number-one song on the Billboard adult contemporary chart.

Chart (1983)	Peak position
Canadian Top Singles (RPM)	34
Canadian Adult Contemporary (RPM)	1
US Billboard Hot 100	40
US Adult Contemporary (Billboard)	1
US Cash Box Top 100 Singles	26

== See also ==
- List of Billboard Adult Contemporary number ones of 1983
