= Papa, Can You Hear Me? =

Single by Barbra Streisand

from the album Yentl (soundtrack)
- A-side: "Papa, Can You Hear Me?"
- B-side: "Will Someone Ever Look At Me That Way?"
- Released: January 1984
- Studio: Lion Share Recording Studios (Los Angeles, CA); Olympic Studios (London, England); The Village (Los Angeles, CA)
- Genre: Traditional pop
- Length: 3:29
- Label: Columbia
- Songwriters: Alan Bergman, Marilyn Bergman (words), Michel Legrand (music)
- Producers: Phil Ramone, Dave Grusin

Barbra Streisand singles chronology
"The Way He Makes Me Feel" (1983)	"Papa, Can You Hear Me?" (1984)	"Left in the Dark" (1984)

Audio
- "Papa, Can You Hear Me?" on YouTube

"Papa, Can You Hear Me?" is a 1983 song composed by Michel Legrand with lyrics by Alan Bergman and Marilyn Bergman, for Barbra Streisand in the title role of Yentl. The song was nominated for Best Original Song at the 56th Academy Awards; Streisand's longtime friend Donna Summer performed it during the ceremonies. The song peaked at No.26 at Billboard's Adult Contemporary.

== Critical reception ==
Herald-Journal deemed it "forgettably gooey". Ottawa Citizen negatively compared the song to the Star Wars theme, postulating that only the most loyal Streisand fans would make a cognitive connection to Yentl upon hearing the song. Chicago Sun-Times deemed it "emotional". Newsweek International said it was a "gay anthem". However, for many Jews, and others who have lost a father, "Papa Can You Hear Me" is comparable to the treasured "My Yiddishe Momme", the moving lament for those who have lost a mother. Healing Times: A Personal Workbook created a therapeutic exercise based around the song.

== Covers ==
Singer and pianist Nina Simone recorded the song in 1993 on her final album A Single Woman. Her father had died in the 1970s.

Also in 1993, actor and singer Michael Crawford recorded the song for his album A Touch of Music in the Night.

Charlotte Church recorded the song as the 5th track on her 2001 album Enchantment.

West End performer Meredith Braun recorded the song on her 2012 album "Someone Else's Story"

Iranian singer Helen Matevosian covered it in her studio album Oghyanoose Khali ("Empty Ocean").

In 2006 at her "Un Regard 9" concert in Paris, Lara Fabian, the Belgian-Canadian singer, paid homage to Streisand's voice then sang the song live. A recording of the performance was released on the album Un regard 9 Live.
