= Memories (Barbra Streisand album) =

Compilation album by Barbra Streisand
- Released: November 10, 1981
- Genre: Pop
- Length: 40:21
- Label: Columbia
- Producer: Charles Koppelman (exec.); Andrew Lloyd Webber; Bob Gaudio; Gary Klein; Charlie Calello; Barbra Streisand; Phil Ramone; Barry Gibb; Albhy Galuten; Karl Richardson; Marty Paich

Barbra Streisand chronology
Guilty (1980)	Memories (1981)	Yentl (1983)

Singles from Memories
- 1. "Comin' In and Out of Your Life" Released: November 1981; 2. "Memory" Released: February 1982

Professional ratings
Review scores
Source	Rating
AllMusic	3/5 stars

Memories is a compilation album by American singer Barbra Streisand, released in 1981. It is primarily a compilation of previously released material, but includes three newly recorded songs. First released on Columbia, it was re-released under the CBS imprint in 1981 with four additional tracks.

Two brand new recordings "Memory" and "Comin' In and Out of Your Life" were included and both released as singles. "Comin' In and Out of Your Life" was the most successful of the new singles, peaking at No. 11 on the Billboard Hot 100 in the US. The album also included a previously unreleased solo version of "Lost Inside of You" which had appeared on her 1976 soundtrack album A Star Is Born as a duet with Kris Kristofferson.

The album was certified 5× Platinum by the RIAA, reaching number 10 on the US Billboard 200.

In the UK, where it was released as Love Songs, it reached number 1 on the UK Albums Chart for nine weeks (seven of them consecutively and it became the best-selling album of 1982 there, the first album by a female performer to achieve it). The album was certified platinum in the UK (prior to multi-platinum awards being given), and 6× platinum in Australia.

According to the liner notes of Streisand's retrospective box set, Just for the Record, the album also received a record certification in the Netherlands and in Switzerland.

The album won Brit Award for British Album of the Year as Best Selling Album at the 1983 Brit Awards. It sold over 10 million copies worldwide.

== Track listing ==
Side A
No.	Title	Writer(s)	Producer(s)	Length
1.	"Memory" (from the musical Cats, 1981)	Andrew Lloyd Webber; T. S. Eliot; Trevor Nunn	Webber	3:53
2.	"You Don't Bring Me Flowers" (feat. Neil Diamond) (from Greatest Hits Volume 2, 1978)	Neil Diamond; Alan Bergman; Marilyn Bergman	Bob Gaudio	3:24
3.	"My Heart Belongs to Me" (from Superman, 1977)	Alan Gordon	Gary Klein; Charlie Calello	3:22
4.	"New York State of Mind" (from Superman)	Billy Joel	Klein	4:43
5.	"No More Tears (Enough Is Enough)" (Radio Edit) (feat. Donna Summer) (from Wet and On The Radio, 1979)	Paul Jabara; Bruce Roberts	Klein	4:43

Side B
No.	Title	Writer(s)	Producer(s)	Length
6.	"Comin' In and Out of Your Life"	Richard Parker; Bobby Whiteside	Webber	4:09
7.	"Evergreen" (from A Star Is Born, 1976)	Barbra Streisand; Paul Williams	Streisand; Phil Ramone	3:05
8.	"Lost Inside of You" (Solo Version) (from A Star Is Born)	Leon Russell; Streisand	Klein	3:57
9.	"The Love Inside" (from Guilty, 1980)	Barry Gibb	Gibb; Albhy Galuten; Karl Richardson	5:04
10.	"The Way We Were" (from The Way We Were, 1974)	Marvin Hamlisch; Alan Bergman; Marilyn Bergman	Marty Paich	3:30

Love Songs & CBS re-issue
No.	Title	Writer(s)	Producer(s)	Length
1.	"Memory" (from the musical Cats)	Andrew Lloyd Webber; T. S. Eliot; Trevor Nunn	Webber	3:53
2.	"You Don't Bring Me Flowers" (feat. Neil Diamond) (from Greatest Hits Volume 2)	Neil Diamond; Alan Bergman; Marilyn Bergman	Bob Gaudio	3:24
3.	"My Heart Belongs to Me" (from Superman)	Alan Gordon	Gary Klein; Charlie Calello	3:22
4.	"Wet" (from Wet)	David Wolfert; Sue Sheridan; Barbra Streisand	Klein	3:59
5.	"New York State of Mind" (from Superman)	Billy Joel	Klein	4:43
6.	"A Man I Loved" (from Songbird, 1978)	Niki Oosterveen; George Michalski	Klein	4:02
7.	"No More Tears (Enough Is Enough)" (Radio Edit) (feat. Donna Summer)	Paul Jabara; Bruce Roberts	Klein	4:43
8.	"Comin' In and Out of Your Life"	Richard Parker; Bobby Whiteside	Webber	4:09
9.	"Evergreen" (from A Star Is Born)	Streisand; Paul Williams	Streisand; Phil Ramone	3:05
10.	"I Don't Break Easily" (from Songbird)	Roberts	Klein	3:51
11.	"Kiss Me in the Rain" (from Wet)	Sandy Farina; Lisa Ratner	Klein	4:18
12.	"Lost Inside of You" (Solo Version) (from A Star Is Born)	Leon Russell; Streisand	Klein	3:57
13.	"The Love Inside" (from Guilty)	Barry Gibb	Gibb; Albhy Galuten; Karl Richardson	5:04
14.	"The Way We Were" (from The Way We Were)	Marvin Hamlisch; Alan Bergman; Marilyn Bergman	Marty Paich	3:30

== Personnel ==
- Charles Calello – producer
- Nancy Donald – design
- Albhy Galuten – producer
- Bob Gaudio – producer
- Barry Gibb – producer
- Greg Gorman – photography
- Gary Klein – producer
- Charles Koppelman – executive producer
- Tony Lane – design
- Andrew Lloyd Webber – producer
- Marty Paich – arranger, producer
- Phil Ramone – producer
- Karl Richardson – producer
- Barbra Streisand – producer

== Charts ==
=== Weekly charts ===
Chart (1981)	Peak position
Australian Albums (ARIA)	7
Austrian Albums (Ö3 Austria)	17
Canadian Albums Chart	14
Dutch Albums (Album Top 100)	6
Finnish Albums (Suomen virallinen lista)	2
Japanese Albums (Oricon)	56
French Albums Chart	5
New Zealand Albums (RMNZ)	2
Norwegian Albums (VG-lista)	6
Spanish Albums Chart	20
Swedish Albums (Sverigetopplistan)	4
UK Albums (OCC)	1
US Billboard 200	10
US Cashbox Top Albums	6

=== Year-end charts ===
Chart (1982)	Position
New Zealand Albums (Recorded Music NZ)	7
UK Albums (OCC)	1
US Cash Box	50

== Certifications and sales ==
Region	Certification	Certified units/sales
Argentina (CAPIF)	Gold	30,000^{^}
Australia (ARIA)	6× Platinum	420,000^{^}
Austria (IFPI Austria)	Platinum	50,000^{*}
Canada (Music Canada)	2× Platinum	200,000^{^}
Finland (Musiikkituottajat)	Platinum	71,207
France (SNEP)	2× Platinum	600,000^{*}
Hong Kong (IFPI Hong Kong)	Gold	10,000^{*}
Japan	—	14,760
Netherlands (NVPI)	Platinum	100,000^{^}
New Zealand (RMNZ)	Platinum	15,000^{^}
Portugal (AFP)	Silver	10,000^{^}
United Kingdom (BPI) released as Love Songs	Platinum	300,000^{^}
United States (RIAA)	5× Platinum	5,000,000^{^}
Yugoslavia	—	35,244
Summaries
Worldwide	—	10,000,000
^{*} Sales figures based on certification alone.^{^} Shipments figures based on certification alone.

== See also ==
- List of best-selling albums by women
