= Barbra Streisand's Greatest Hits Volume 2 =

Greatest hits album by Barbra Streisand
- Released: November 15, 1978
- Recorded: July 1970–February 1978
- Genres: Pop; soft rock; traditional pop
- Length: 39:35
- Label: Columbia
- Producers: Charles Koppelman (executive); Barbra Streisand; Phil Ramone; Gary Klein; Charlie Calello; Bob Gaudio; Marty Paich; Richard Perry; Tommy LiPuma

Barbra Streisand chronology
Songbird (1978)	Barbra Streisand's Greatest Hits Volume 2 (1978)	The Main Event (1979)

Singles from Barbra Streisand's Greatest Hits Volume 2
- 1. "You Don't Bring Me Flowers" Released: October 7, 1978; 2. "Superman" Released: March 1979

Barbra Streisand's Greatest Hits Volume 2 is the second greatest hits album recorded by American vocalist Barbra Streisand. It was released on November 15, 1978 by Columbia Records. The album is a compilation consisting of ten commercially successful singles from the singer's releases in the 1970s, with a majority of them being cover songs. It also features a new version of "You Don't Bring Me Flowers", which was released as the collection's first single (Superman was later released as a second single from this album, and the 45 features alternate vocals) on October 7, 1978. Originating on Streisand's previous album, Songbird, the new rendition is a duet with Neil Diamond who had also recorded the song for his album I'm Glad You're Here with Me Tonight. The idea for the duet originated from DJ Gary Guthrie who sold the idea to the record label for $5 million.

Critically appreciated, Barbra Streisand's Greatest Hits Volume 2 received a perfect five-star rating from both AllMusic and Rolling Stone. It was also a commercial success, topping the charts in Canada, New Zealand, the United Kingdom and the United States, and peaking at number two in Australia. The album later received certifications in a total of six countries, including in Australia, Canada and the United States. In the latter country, it was certified 5× Platinum and sold over 5 million copies according to the Recording Industry Association of America.

== Promotion and development ==
In May 1978, Streisand released her twentieth studio album Songbird that featured the song "You Don't Bring Me Flowers". Despite not being released as a physical or commercial single from Songbird, it was distributed in a 7" record format on October 7, 1978. However, the version that appears on Barbra Streisand's Greatest Hits Volume 2 is a duet with American singer Neil Diamond, who also contributed to the song's lyrics. As Streisand released Songbird, Diamond had already recorded a version of "You Don't Bring Me Flowers" on his "I'm Glad You're Here with Me Tonight" album. Because both versions of the song were recorded in the same key, American DJ Gary Guthrie combined the two songs together while playing records at a local radio station in Louisville, Kentucky. Guthrie pitched the idea to CBS Records International (the international arm of Columbia) for a $5 million contract, to which they eventually accepted, despite CBS breaching the contract initially. Their collaboration was a global, commercial success, topping the charts in both the United States and Canada. The version with Diamond has since sold more than 2 million copies in the United States.

A sequel to her first greatest hits album, Barbra Streisand's Greatest Hits (1970), the second volume contains ten singles released during Streisand's second decade in the recording industry, ranging from "Stoney End" (1970) to "You Don't Bring Me Flowers" (1978). The songs featured on the record were recorded between July 1970 and October 1978. Overall, it features a total of three number-one hits ("The Way We Were", "Evergreen", and "You Don't Bring Me Flowers"), two top-ten singles ("Stoney End" and "My Heart Belongs to Me"), and three Top 40 songs ("Sweet Inspiration / Where You Lead", "Songbird", and "Prisoner"). "All in Love Is Fair" and "Superman" are the two other songs on the track listing. Columbia Records released the compilation on November 15, 1978. The label also issued an 8-track cartridge version of the album in 1978, with a differing track listing; single "You Don't Bring Me Flowers" was split into two separate parts increasing the number of tracks on the record from ten to eleven. In 1987, the album was released in a compact disc format.

== Critical reception ==
Professional ratings
Review scores
Source	Rating
AllMusic	5/5 stars
Rolling Stone	5/5 stars

Barbra Streisand's Greatest Hits Volume 2 was critically acclaimed by music critics. It was given a perfect five out of five stars rating by AllMusic's William Ruhlmann, who called it a "genre-defining album [...] that drew upon the rock revolution to redefine classic pop for a new generation". He also gave praise towards the album for successfully capturing the best of her "contemporary soft-rock [and] highly successful" singles from her "largely inconsistent" albums. Additionally, Ruhlmann claimed that the success of the record stemmed from the fact that her singles in the 1970s were more "precious" and not always "show music material", contrasting to her songs in the 1960s. The reviewer of the Cash Box magazine wrote: "It is a testament to her talent that she has been able in the 1970s to generate as consistent a string of hits as she did in the '60s, as documented by this LP." As part of Rolling Stone's The New Rolling Stone Record Guide, released in 1983, they rated the collection a perfect five stars. Streisand's first volume from 1970 and Guilty from 1980 also achieved the same status.

== Commercial performance ==
The compilation album was a success, topping the charts in four countries. In the United States, Barbra Streisand's Greatest Hits Volume 2 debuted at number seven on the Billboard 200 chart for the week ending December 2, 1978 (also serving as the week's highest new entry). The following week it rose to number three and on January 6, 1979, it topped the chart. The record spent a total of 46 weeks on the Billboard 200, and by December 1984, the album and Streisand's Guilty (1980) had both sold over 4 million physical copies in the United States, becoming quadruple certified by the RIAA. It would later be re-certified to 5× Platinum on October 28, 1994. It was one of the United States' best-selling albums in 1979, coming in at number 28 on Billboard's annual year-end chart. Billboard's Fred Bronson wrote in The Billboard Book of Number One Hits that the commercial and critical achievements of "You Don't Bring Me Flowers" is what made Barbra Streisand's Greatest Hits Volume 2 a certified Platinum album in the US.

On Canada's chart, compiled by RPM, it debuted at number 60 on the week ending December 9, 1978. Four weeks later, it would top the chart on January 13, 1979. Overall, it spent a total of 20 weeks charting in Canada and later received a triple platinum certification from Music Canada on March 1, 1979. It was also Streisand's first chart-topping album in the United Kingdom, where it spent four consecutive weeks at the highest ranking position and later was certified Platinum for sales upwards of 300,000 copies.

In New Zealand, the album debuted at number five on January 28, 1979, becoming the chart's highest new entry. The following week, it topped the chart and remained at that position for four consecutive weeks; overall, it spent a total of 19 weeks charting in that country. It also charted in Australia, where it peaked at number two according to the Kent Music Report. The Australian Recording Industry Association certified Barbra Streisand's Greatest Hits Volume 2 double Platinum in 2000, signifying sales upwards of 140,000. Although the compilation did not chart in Hong Kong, the International Federation of the Phonographic Industry certified the album Platinum for sales of 20,000 copies in 1982.

== Track listing ==
Barbra Streisand's Greatest Hits Volume 2 – Standard edition
No.	Title	Writer(s)	Producer(s)	Length
1.	"Evergreen" (from A Star Is Born, 1976)	Barbra Streisand; Paul Williams	Streisand; Phil Ramone	3:09
2.	"Prisoner" (from Eyes of Laura Mars, 1978)	Karen Lawrence; John Desautels	Charles Koppelman; Gary Klein	3:57
3.	"My Heart Belongs to Me" (from Superman, 1977)	Alan Gordon	Klein; Charlie Calello	3:24
4.	"Songbird" (from Songbird, 1978)	Dave Wolfert; Stephen Nelson	Koppelman; Klein	3:48
5.	"You Don't Bring Me Flowers" (with Neil Diamond)	Alan Bergman; Marilyn Bergman; Diamond	Bob Gaudio	3:26
6.	"The Way We Were" (from The Way We Were, 1974)	A. Bergman; M. Bergman; Marvin Hamlisch	Marty Paich	3:30
7.	"Sweet Inspiration / Where You Lead" (from Live Concert at the Forum, 1972)	Dan Penn; Spooner Oldham; Carole King; Toni Stern	Richard Perry	6:20
8.	"All in Love Is Fair" (from The Way We Were)	Stevie Wonder	Tommy LiPuma	3:52
9.	"Superman" (from Superman)	Richie Snyder	Klein	2:50
10.	"Stoney End" (from Stoney End, 1971)	Laura Nyro	Perry	2:58
Total length:				39:35

Barbra Streisand's Greatest Hits Volume 2 – 8-track cartridge edition
No.	Title	Length
1.	"Evergreen"	3:09
2.	"My Heart Belongs to Me"	3:24
3.	"Stoney End"	2:58
4.	"Prisoner"	3:57
5.	"All in Love Is Fair"	3:52
6.	"You Don't Bring Me Flowers" (Beginning) (with Neil Diamond)	2:02
7.	"You Don't Bring Me Flowers" (Conclusion) (with Neil Diamond)	1:31
8.	"The Way We Were"	3:30
9.	"Songbird"	3:48
10.	"Sweet Inspiration" / "Where You Lead"	6:20
11.	"Superman"	2:50
Total length:		39:42

== Personnel ==
Credits adapted from the liner notes of the CD edition of Barbra Streisand's Greatest Hits Volume 2.

- Barbra Streisand – vocals, production (track 1), songwriter (track 1)
- Alan Bergman – songwriter (tracks 5, 6)
- Marilyn Bergman – songwriter (tracks 5, 6)
- Charlie Calello – production, arrangements (track 3)
- Larry Carlton – rhythm arrangements (tracks 4, 9)
- Nick de Caro – arrangements (track 8), orchestra arrangements (track 4), string and horn arrangements (track 9)
- John Desautels – songwriter (track 2)
- Neil Diamond – composition (track 5), songwriter (track 5), duet vocal (track 5)
- Bob Gaudio – production (track 5)
- Alan Gordon – songwriter (track 3)
- Marvin Hamlisch – composition (track 6), songwriter (track 6)
- Don Hannah – arrangements (track 7)
- Carole King – composition (track 7), songwriter (track 7)
- Gary Klein – production (tracks 2, 3, 4, 9)
- Charles Koppelman – executive production (tracks 2, 4)
- Karen Lawrence – songwriter (track 2)
- Alan Lindgren – arrangements (track 5)
- Tommy LiPuma – production (track 8)
- Stephen Nelson – songwriter (track 4)
- Laura Nyro – songwriter (track 10)
- Spooner Oldham – songwriter (track 7)
- Gene Page – arrangements (track 10)
- Marty Paich – production, arranging (track 6)
- Dan Penn – songwriter (track 7)
- Richard Perry – production (tracks 7, 10)
- Phil Ramone – production (track 1)
- Richie Snyder – songwriter (track 9)
- Toni Stern – songwriter (track 7)
- Paul Williams – songwriter (track 1)
- Dave Wolfert – songwriter (track 4)
- Stevie Wonder – songwriter (track 8)

== Charts ==
=== Weekly charts ===
Weekly chart performance for Barbra Streisand's Greatest Hits Volume 2
Chart (1978–1979)	Peak position
Australia Albums (Kent Music Report)	2
Canada Top Albums/CDs (RPM)	1
New Zealand Albums (RMNZ)	1
UK Albums (Official Charts)	1
US Billboard 200	1
US Top 100 Albums (Cash Box)	1
US The Album Chart (Record World)	1

=== Year-end charts ===
Year-end chart performance for Barbra Streisand's Greatest Hits Volume 2
Chart (1979)	Position
Australia Albums (Kent Music Report)	14
Canada Top Albums/CDs (RPM)	33
New Zealand Albums (RMNZ)	12
UK Albums (OCC)	6
US Billboard 200	28
US Top 100 Albums (Cash Box)	21
US The Album Chart (Record World)	23

== Certifications ==
Certifications for Barbra Streisand's Greatest Hits Volume 2
Region	Certification	Certified units/sales
Australia (ARIA)	2× Platinum	140,000^{^}
Canada (Music Canada)	3× Platinum	300,000^{^}
Hong Kong (IFPI Hong Kong)	Platinum	20,000^{*}
New Zealand (RMNZ)	Platinum	15,000^{^}
United Kingdom (BPI)	Platinum	300,000^{^}
United States (RIAA)	5× Platinum	5,000,000^{^}
^{*} Sales figures based on certification alone.^{^} Shipments figures based on certification alone.

== See also ==
- List of Billboard 200 number-one albums of 1979
- List of UK Albums Chart number ones of the 1970s
