= Superman (Barbra Streisand song) =

- Japanese picture sleeve

Single by Barbra Streisand

from the album Superman and Barbra Streisand's Greatest Hits Volume 2
- B-side: "A Man I Loved"
- Released: March 1978 (World); March 1979 (US)
- Recorded: 1977
- Genre: Pop
- Length: 2:39
- Label: Columbia
- Songwriter: Richie Snyder
- Producer: Gary Klein

Barbra Streisand singles chronology
"You Don't Bring Me Flowers" (1978)	"Superman" (1978)	"The Main Event / Fight" (1979)

"Superman" is a song recorded by American singer Barbra Streisand for her 1977 self-titled nineteenth studio album. The song was written by Richie Snyder, and the recording was produced by Gary Klein.

The song was released as a single in March 1979 in the United States, much later after the release of the Superman album itself. By that time, the Greatest Hits Vol. 2 compilation (which included "Superman") and Songbird had already been released, and Streisand herself was preparing the comedy The Main Event for release. Nevertheless, the single was a success on the adult contemporary charts in Canada and the United States.

On the flip side is the song "A Man I Loved" (written by Niki Oosterveen and George Michalski) from the album Songbird.

== Critical reception ==
The reviewer of Billboard magazine gave a positive assessment to the song, noting how nicely Streisand's clean vocals combine with string instrumentation. Cash Box magazine noted the moderate but firm beat, piano and string, emphasizing Streisand's characteristically powerful vocals. Johh Shearlaw from Record Mirror ironically declared that this was another perfectly executed boring song from Streisand.

== Charts ==
Weekly chart performance for "Superman"
Chart (1979)	Peak position
Canada Adult Oriented Playlist (RPM)	19
US Adult Contemporary (Billboard)	29
