= List of RPM number-one adult contemporary singles of 1978 =

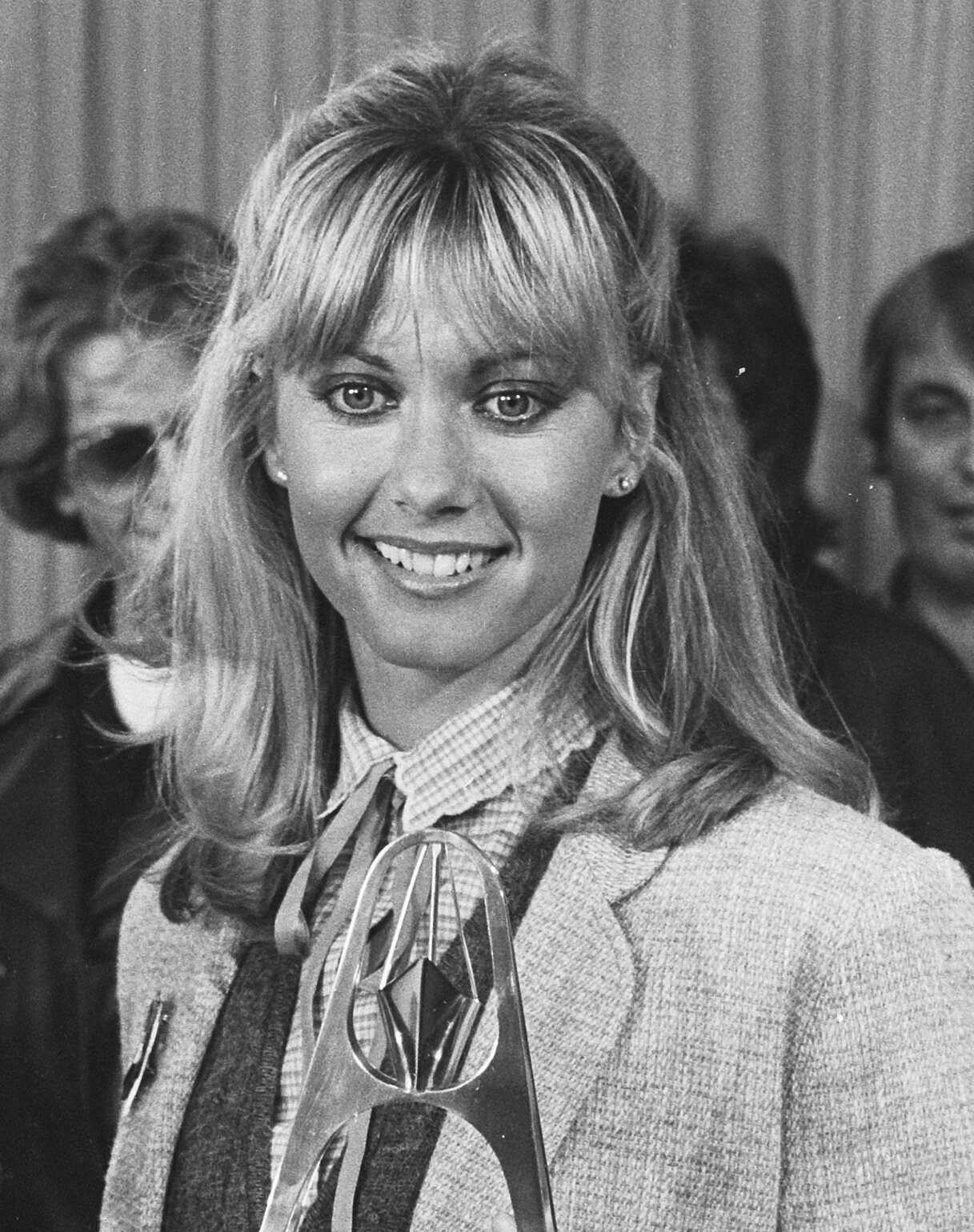
Olivia Newton-John had the most number-ones singles in the chart, with three

In 1978, RPM magazine published a chart for top-performing singles in the easy listening or adult contemporary categories in Canada. The chart, entitled Adult Oriented Playlist, has undergone numerous name changes, becoming Contemporary Adult in 1981 and became Adult Contemporary in 1984 until the magazine's final publication in November 2000. In 1978, 36 individual singles reached number one in the chart, which contains 50 positions. The first number-one in 1978 was "Sweet Music Man" by American country singer Kenny Rogers, continuing from the 1977 charts, and the last was "Time Passages" by British singer-songwriter Al Stewart. Sixteen acts have their first number-one in the chart in 1978: Billy Joel, Randy Newman, Dan Hill, Johnny Mathis, Deniece Williams, Kansas, Donny Hathaway, John Travolta, Bonnie Tyler, Chuck Mangione, Michael Johnson, the Commodores, Kim Carnes, Chris Rea, Donna Summer, Little River Band and Al Stewart. Elvis Presley had one posthumous number-one single the week of January 28 with his version of "My Way", which was released as a single weeks after his death in 1977. Four Canadian acts, Dan Hill, Gordon Lightfoot, Anne Murray and Burton Cummings had at least one number-one that year.

American country performer Dolly Parton had the longest number-one chart run in 1978, with "Heartbreaker", which stayed at number one for four weeks. English-Australian singer and actress Olivia Newton-John had the most number-one easy listening singles in 1978, with "I Honestly Love You" (re-release), "You're the One That I Want" (with John Travolta, from the Grease soundtrack) and "Hopelessly Devoted to You" (also from Grease), and has totalled four weeks at number one. Barbra Streisand also had four weeks at number one with "Songbird" and "You Don't Bring Me Flowers" (with Neil Diamond); both singles had two weeks at number one. Billy Joel spent three weeks at number-one in the Canadian easy-listening chart with "Just the Way You Are".

== Chart history ==
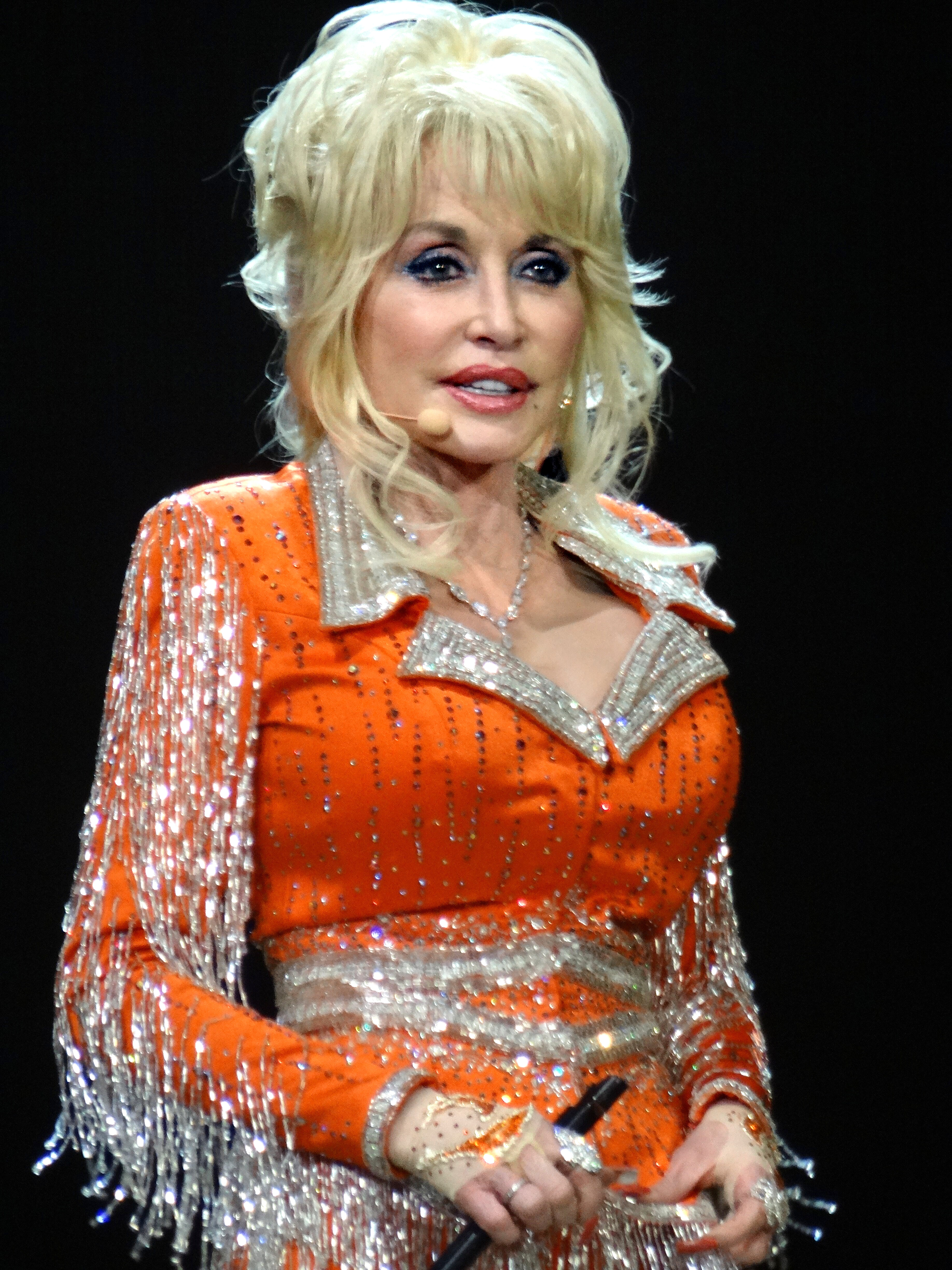
Dolly Parton spent four weeks at number one in the chart with "Heartbreaker"

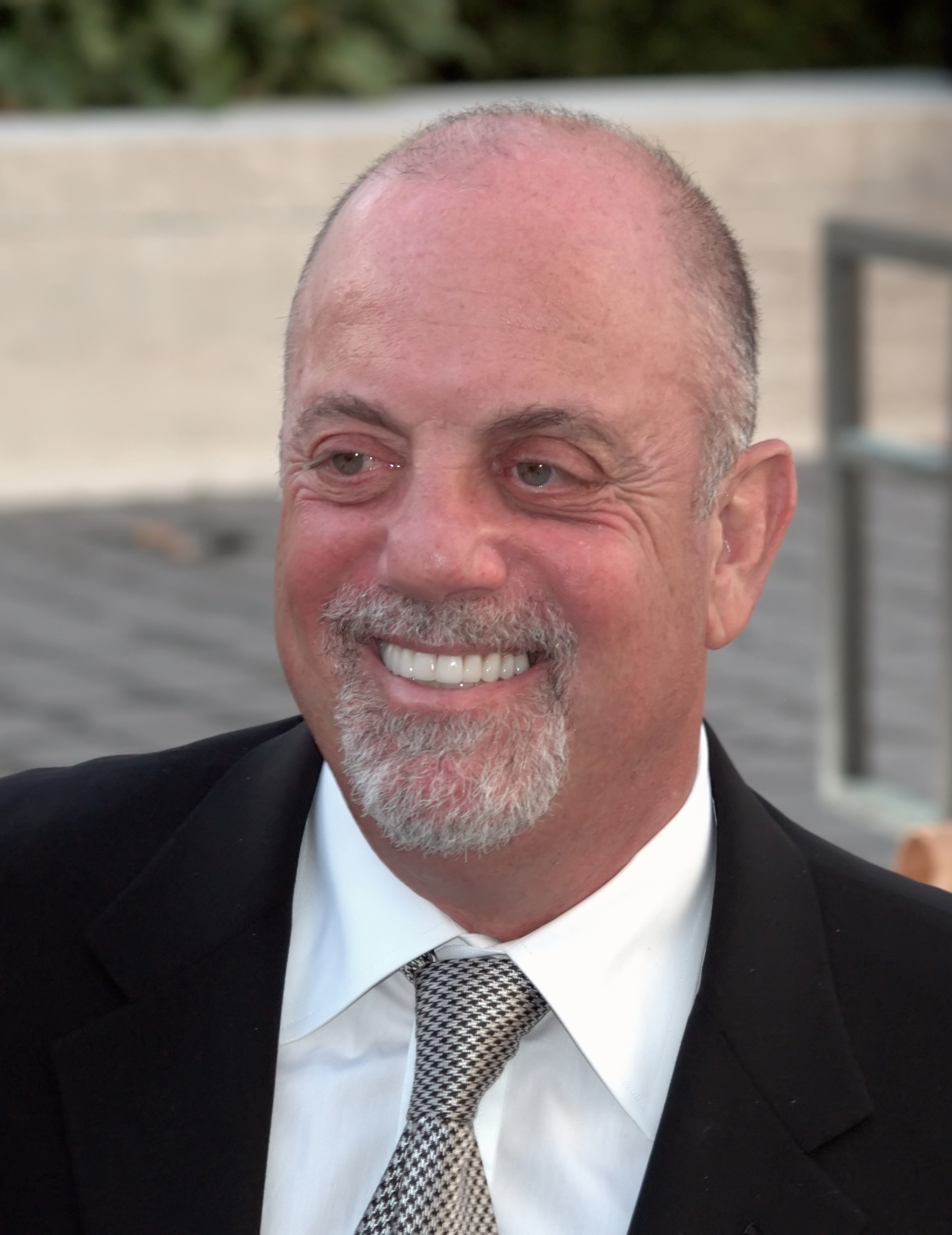
Billy Joel (pictured in 2009) spent three weeks at number one in the chart with "Just the Way You Are"

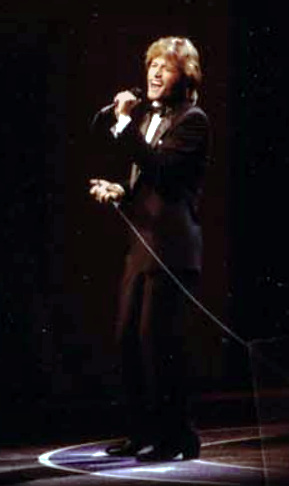
Andy Gibb had two number-one singles in the chart with "(Love Is) Thicker Than Water" and "Shadow Dancing"

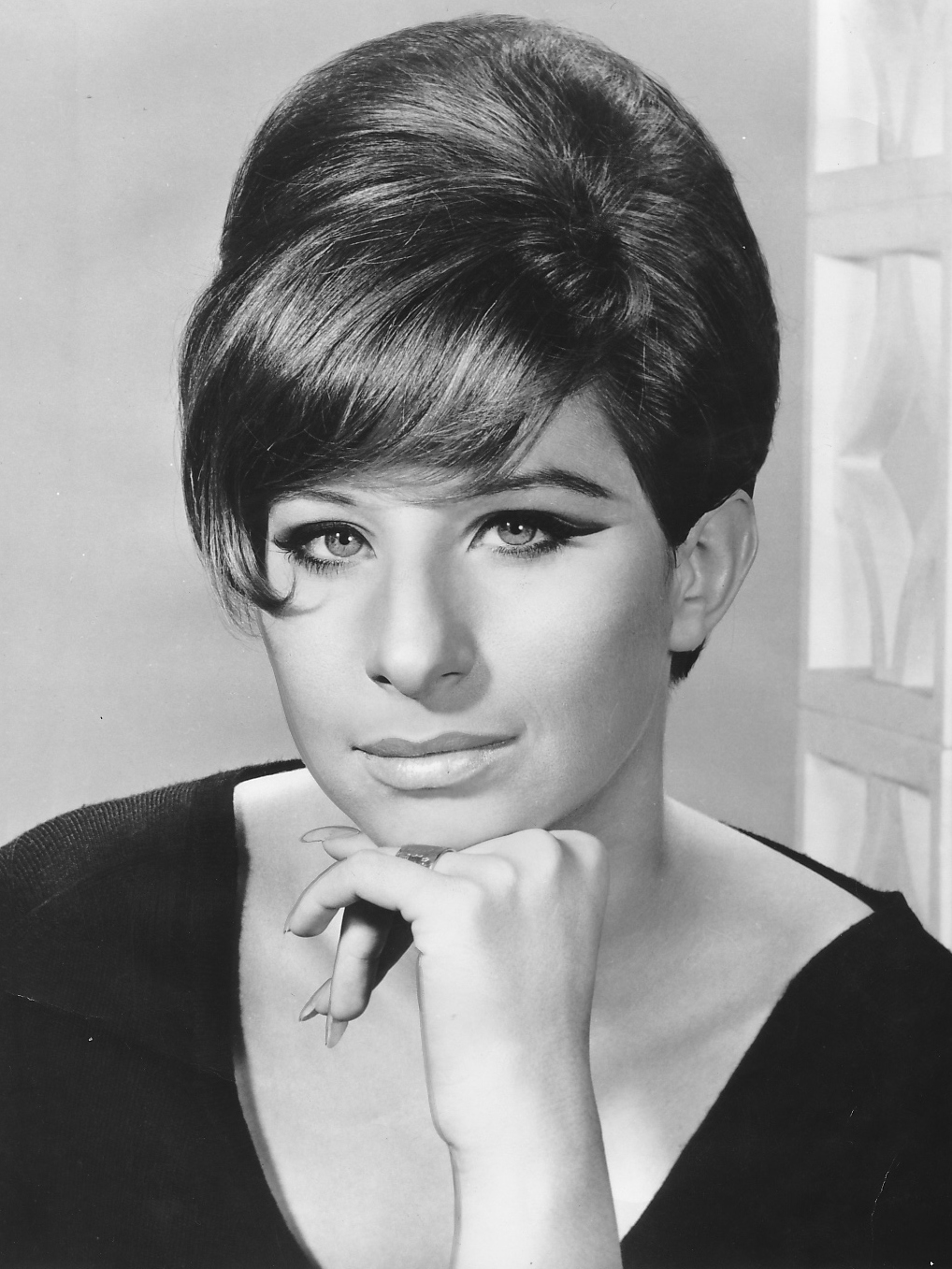
Barbra Streisand spent two weeks at number one with "Songbird" and "You Don't Bring Me Flowers" (with Neil Diamond).

Chart history
Issue date	Title	Artist(s)	Ref.
January 7 (Note: Due to a week's break in publication for the 1977/1978 New Year period, the week of January 7 is inferred.)	"Sweet Music Man"	Kenny Rogers	
January 14	"I Honestly Love You"	Olivia Newton-John	
January 21	"Desiree"	Neil Diamond	
January 28	"My Way"	Elvis Presley	
February 4	"Just the Way You Are"	Billy Joel	
February 11	"Just the Way You Are"	Billy Joel	
February 18	"Just the Way You Are"	Billy Joel	
February 25	"(Love Is) Thicker Than Water"	Andy Gibb	
March 4	"Desiree"	Neil Diamond	
March 11	"Small People"	Randy Newman	
March 18	"Sometimes When We Touch"	Dan Hill	
March 25	"(What a) Wonderful World"	Art Garfunkel	
April 1	"(What a) Wonderful World"	Art Garfunkel	
April 8	"The Circle Is Small"	Gordon Lightfoot	
April 15	"The Circle Is Small"	Gordon Lightfoot	
April 22	"Lay Down Sally"	Eric Clapton	
April 29	"Night Fever"	Bee Gees	
May 6	"Night Fever"	Bee Gees	
May 13	"Too Much, Too Little, Too Late"	Johnny Mathis and Deniece Williams	
May 20	"Too Much, Too Little, Too Late"	Johnny Mathis and Deniece Williams	
May 27	"Dust in the Wind"	Kansas	
June 3	"The Last of the Romantics"	Engelbert Humperdinck	
June 10	"The Closer I Get to You"	Roberta Flack and Donny Hathaway	
June 17	"You're the One That I Want"	Olivia Newton-John and John Travolta	
June 24	"You're the One That I Want"	Olivia Newton-John and John Travolta	
July 1	"It's a Heartache"	Bonnie Tyler	
July 8	"Feels So Good"	Chuck Mangione	
July 15	"Shadow Dancing"	Andy Gibb	
July 22	"Bluer Than Blue"	Michael Johnson	
July 29	"Songbird"	Barbra Streisand	
August 5	"Songbird"	Barbra Streisand	
August 12	"You Needed Me"	Anne Murray	
August 19	"Three Times a Lady"	Commodores	
August 26	"Three Times a Lady"	Commodores	
September 2	"You're a Part of Me"	Gene Cotton and Kim Carnes	
September 9	"Grease"	Frankie Valli	
September 16	"Fool (If You Think It's Over)"	Chris Rea	
September 23	"You"	Rita Coolidge	
September 30	"Hopelessly Devoted to You"	Olivia Newton-John	
October 7	"Break It to Them Gently"	Burton Cummings	
October 14	"Break It to Them Gently"	Burton Cummings	
October 21	"Heartbreaker"	Dolly Parton	
October 28	"Heartbreaker"	Dolly Parton	
November 4 (Note: No charts were published for the weeks of November 4 and 11, so these are inferred.)	"Heartbreaker"	Dolly Parton	
November 11	"Heartbreaker"	Dolly Parton	
November 18	"MacArthur Park"	Donna Summer	
November 25	"MacArthur Park"	Donna Summer	
December 2	"Ready to Take a Chance Again"	Barry Manilow	
December 9	"Reminiscing"	Little River Band	
December 16	"You Don't Bring Me Flowers"	Barbra Streisand and Neil Diamond	
December 23	"You Don't Bring Me Flowers"	Barbra Streisand and Neil Diamond	
December 30	"Time Passages"	Al Stewart	
