= Live at the Royal Festival Hall (Glen Campbell album) =

Live album by Glen Campbell
- Released: November 1977
- Recorded: April 2, 1977
- Venue: Royal Festival Hall, London
- Label: Capitol
- Producer: Glen Campbell, Gary Klein

Glen Campbell chronology
Southern Nights (1977)	Live at the Royal Festival Hall (1977)	Basic (1978)

Live at the Royal Festival Hall is the third live album by American singer-songwriter Glen Campbell, released in November 1977 by Capitol Records.

== Track listing ==
Side 1

1. "Stars / Rhinestone Cowboy" (Janis Ian / Larry Weiss) – 6:14
2. "Dreams of the Everyday Housewife" (Chris Gantry) – 2:03
3. "(Let Me Be Your) Teddy Bear (Kal Mann, Bernie Lowe) / Loving You" (Jerry Leiber, Mike Stoller) – 4:55
4. "Streets of London" (Ralph McTell) – 3:02
5. "Try a Little Kindness" (Bobby Austin, Curt Sapaugh) – 1:58

Side 2

1. "Southern Nights" (Allen Toussaint) – 3:16
2. "Good Vibrations/Help Me Rhonda/Surfer Girl/Surfin' U.S.A." (Brian Wilson, Mike Love, Chuck Berry) – 5:26
3. "God Only Knows" (Brian Wilson, Tony Asher) – 2:59
4. "If You Go Away" (Jacques Brel, Rod McKuen) – 3:23
5. "Sunflower" (Neil Diamond) – 2:51

Side 3

1. "By The Time I Get To Phoenix" (Jimmy Webb) – 2:51
2. "Galveston" (Jimmy Webb) – 3:05
3. "Wichita Lineman" (Jimmy Webb) – 2:47
4. "MacArthur Park" (Jimmy Webb) – 7:00
5. "This is Sarah's Song" (Jimmy Webb) – 2:22

Side 4

1. "Classical Gas" (Mason Williams) – 2:41
2. "William Tell Overture" (Gioachino Rossini) – 2:34
3. "Soliloquy from Carousel" (Richard Rodgers, Oscar Hammerstein II) – 7:12
4. "That's When The Music Takes Me" (Neil Sedaka) – 2:46
5. "Amazing Grace" (John Newton) – 3:51

== Personnel ==
Music

- Glen Campbell – vocals, acoustic guitars and electric guitars, bagpipes
- George Green – drums
- Carl Jackson – acoustic guitars and electric guitars, banjo
- T.J. Kuenster – piano
- Bill McCubbin – bass guitar
- Fred Tackett – acoustic guitar
- Billie Barnum, Ann White, Stephanie Spruill – background vocals
- The Royal Philharmonic Orchestra

Production

- Glen Campbell – producer
- Gary Klein – producer
- Armin Steiner – engineer
- Alyn Ainsworth – conductor
- Jimmy Webb – conductor
- Roy Kohara – art direction
- Brian McLaughlin – photography

== Charts ==
Album - Billboard (United States)

Chart	Entry date	Peak position	No. of weeks
Billboard Country Albums	12/17/1977	23	13
Billboard 200	01/07/1978	171	5
