= Southern Nights (Glen Campbell album) =

Studio album by Glen Campbell
- Released: February 1977
- Recorded: 1976
- Studio: Capitol (Hollywood)
- Genres: Country, pop
- Length: 30:15
- Label: Capitol
- Producers: Gary Klein, Glen Campbell

Glen Campbell chronology
| Bloodline (1976) | Southern Nights (1977) | Live at the Royal Festival Hall (1978) |

Singles from Southern Nights
- 1. "Southern Nights" / "William Tell Overture" Released: 1977; 2. "Sunflower" / "How High Did We Go" Released: 1977

Professional ratings
Review scores
| Source | Rating |
|---|---|
| AllMusic | 4/5 stars |

Southern Nights is an album by American singer and guitarist Glen Campbell, released in 1977 by Capitol Records. The album peaked at number one on the Billboard Top Country Albums chart, and one of the singles from the album, "Southern Nights" (a cover of the song by Allen Toussaint), also reached the number one spot on both the Billboard Hot 100 and Hot Country Songs charts.

== Track listing ==
Side 1:

1. "Southern Nights" (Allen Toussaint) – 3:07
2. "This Is Sarah's Song" (Jimmy Webb) – 2:34
3. "For Cryin' Out Loud" (Micheal Smotherman) – 3:03
4. "God Only Knows" (Brian Wilson, Tony Asher) – 3:18
5. "Sunflower" (Neil Diamond) – 2:50

Side 2:

1. "Guide Me" (John Jennings) – 2:24
2. "Early Morning Song" (Jimmy Webb) – 3:30
3. "(I'm Getting) Used to the Crying" (Roger Miller, Micheal Smotherman) – 2:47
4. "Let Go" (Brian Cadd) – 3:30
5. "How High Did We Go" (Victoria Medlin, Ned Albright) – 3:04

== Personnel ==
- Glen Campbell – vocals, acoustic guitars, electric guitars
- Scott Mathews – drums, dobro
- Carl Jackson – banjo, acoustic guitars, electric guitars
- Fred Tackett – acoustic guitar
- Bill McCubbin – bass guitar
- Bill Graham – bass guitar
- Dennis McCarthy – piano
- Jimmy Webb – piano
- Micheal Smotherman – keyboards
- David Foster – keyboards
- David Paich – keyboards
- George Green – drums
- Joe Porcaro – drums
- Milt Holland – percussion
- Gayle Levant – harp
- Ethan Reilly – pedal steel guitar
- Billie Barnum, Stephanie Spruill, Ann White, Darlene Groncki, Mary Arnold, Patti Brooks, Martie McCall - backing vocals

== Production ==
- Producers – Gary Klein, Glen Campbell
- Arranged & conducted by Charlie Calello
- "This Is Sarah's Song" and "Early Morning Song" arranged and conducted by Jimmy Webb
- "Sunflower", "Let Go", "Guide Me" and "How High Did We Go" arranged by Jack Nitzsche and conducted by Alan Broadbent
- Engineers – Armin Steiner, Linda Tyler, Al Schmitt, Greg Venable, Hugh Davies, Joe Jorgensen
- Mixing – Armin Steiner, Godfrey Diamond
- Production coordinator – Rosemary Xhiaverini
- Art direction – Roy Kohara
- Photography – Kenny Rogers
- Illustration – Gary van der Steur

== Charts ==
=== Weekly charts ===
| Chart (1977) | Peak position |
|---|---|
| Australia (Kent Music Report) | 95 |
| Canada Top Albums/CDs (RPM) | 4 |
| UK Albums (Official Charts) | 51 |
| US Billboard 200 | 22 |
| US Top Country Albums (Billboard) | 1 |

=== Year-end charts ===
| Chart (1977) | Position |
|---|---|
| Canada Top Albums/CDs (RPM) | 28 |
| US Top Country Albums (Billboard) | 7 |

=== Singles ===
| Year | Single | Peak chart positions | | | | | |
| Year | Single | US Country | US | US AC | CAN Country | CAN | CAN AC |
|---|---|---|---|---|---|---|---|
| 1977 | "Southern Nights" | 1 | 1 | 1 | 2 | 1 | 1 |
| 1977 | "Sunflower" | 4 | 39 | 1 | 7 | 37 | — |

== See also ==
- 1977 in music
