= List of Billboard Easy Listening number ones of 1977 =

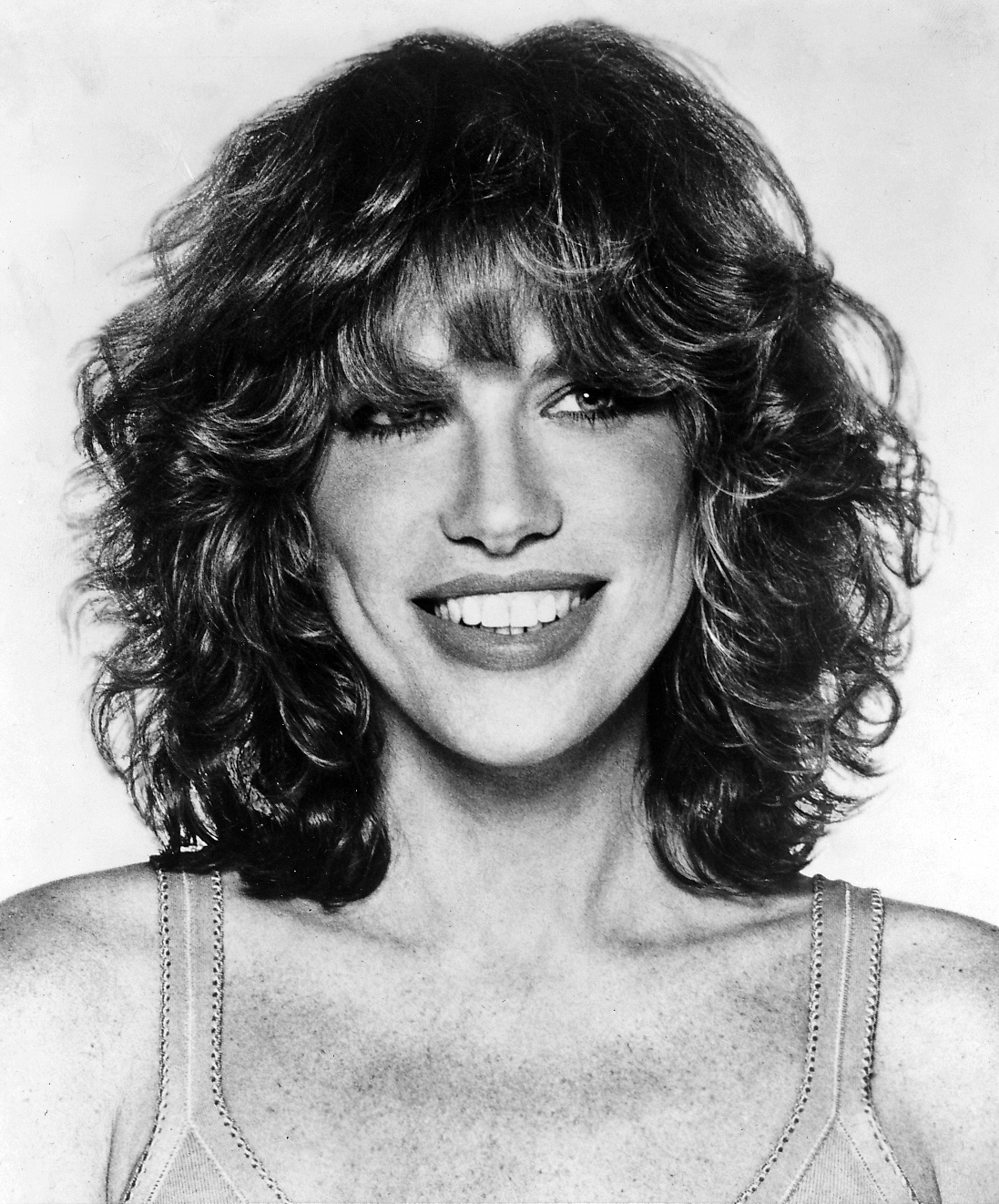
Carly Simon spent seven weeks at number one with "Nobody Does It Better", the theme from the James Bond film The Spy Who Loved Me.

In 1977, Billboard magazine published a chart ranking the top-performing songs in the United States in the easy listening or middle of the road market. The chart, which in 1977 was entitled Easy Listening, has undergone various name changes and has been published under the title Adult Contemporary since 1996. In 1977, 20 songs topped the chart based on playlists submitted by radio stations.

The three longest-running chart-toppers of the year were all taken from film soundtracks. Carly Simon had the year's longest run in the top spot, spending seven weeks at number one with "Nobody Does It Better", the theme song from the James Bond film The Spy Who Loved Me. Both "How Deep Is Your Love" by the Bee Gees, from the soundtrack to Saturday Night Fever, and "Evergreen (Love Theme from A Star Is Born)" by Barbra Streisand spent six weeks atop the chart. Streisand's other number one of 1977, "My Heart Belongs to Me", had also been written for the film A Star Is Born but was ultimately not used, and was instead included on her album Superman. Debby Boone's November number one "You Light Up My Life" was a recording of a song from the film of the same name, released in the same year. Although the song was sung in the film by Kasey Cisyk, Boone was brought in to record a new vocal over the existing instrumental backing track and this was the version that achieved chart success. The song spent a record-breaking ten weeks at number one on Billboard's pop singles chart, the Hot 100, but only spent one week atop the Easy Listening chart.

In addition to "You Light Up My Life", several of 1977's other Easy Listening number ones had sufficient crossover success to also top the Hot 100, including songs by Mary McGregor, Leo Sayer, David Soul, Barbra Streisand, Barry Manilow and the Bee Gees. "Southern Nights" by Glen Campbell was a triple chart-topper, as in addition to topping both the Easy Listening chart and the Hot 100, it also reached the top spot on the Hot Country Songs listing. Barbra Streisand's total of ten weeks at number one on the Easy Listening listing was the most for any artist in 1977. She was one of only three artists with more than one chart-topper during the year, the others being Glen Campbell, who spent four non-consecutive weeks in the top spot with "Southern Nights" and one week with "Sunflower", and Barry Manilow, who topped the listing for a single week with "Weekend in New England" and a further three with "Looks Like We Made It". The year ended with "How Deep Is Your Love" by the Bee Gees holding the top spot.

== Chart history ==
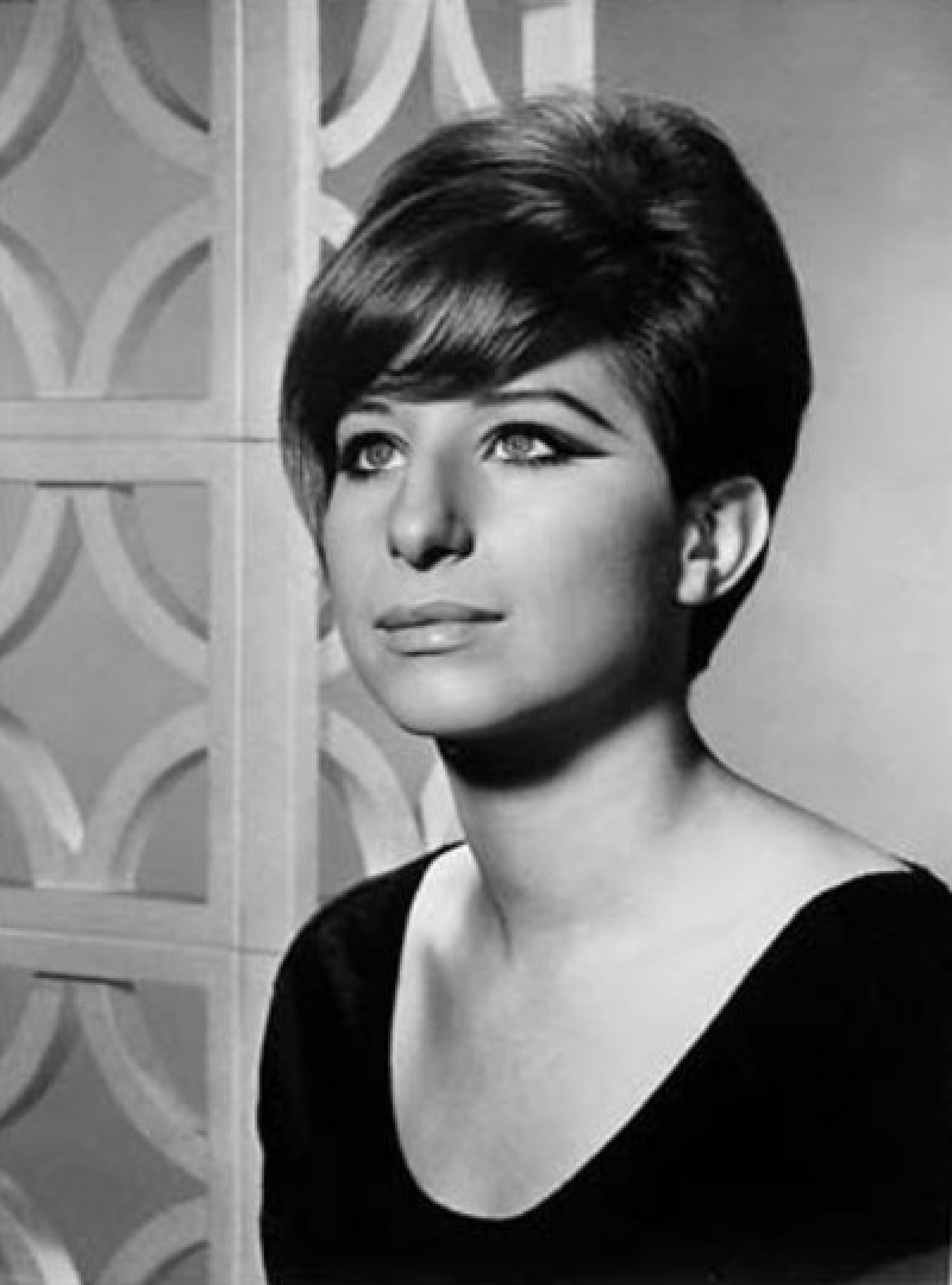
Barbra Streisand (pictured in 1965) spent ten weeks at number one in 1977, the most by any act.

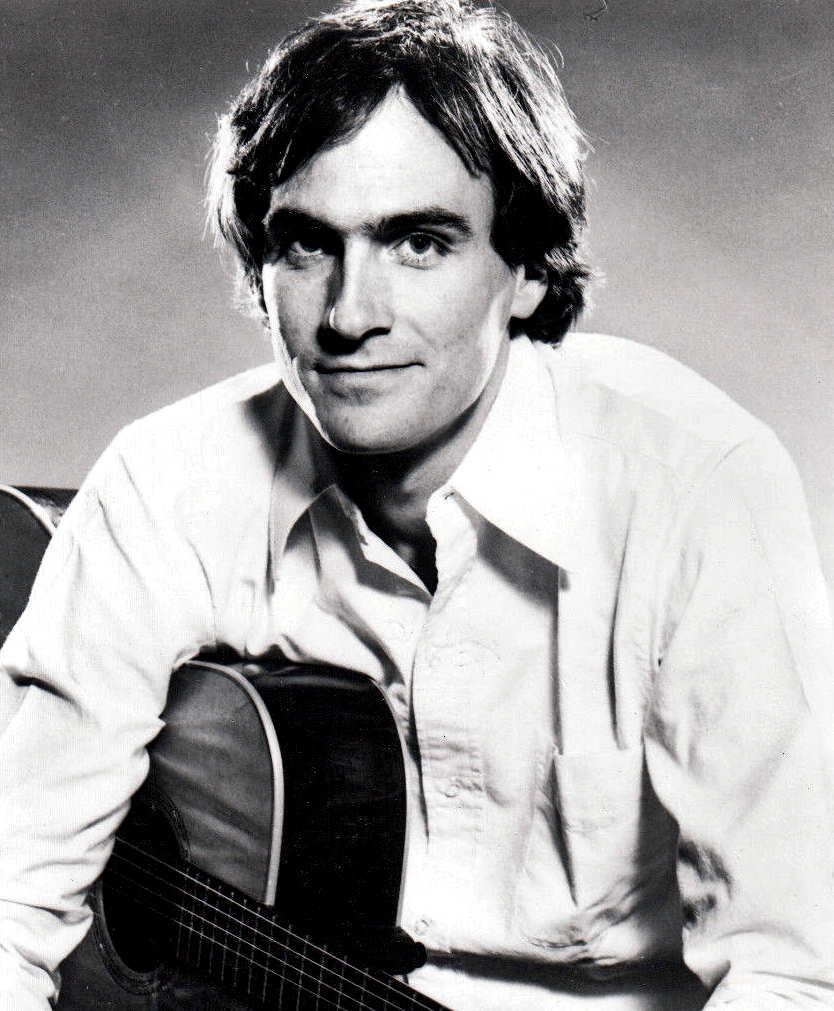
James Taylor took his version of the 1950s song "Handy Man" to number one.

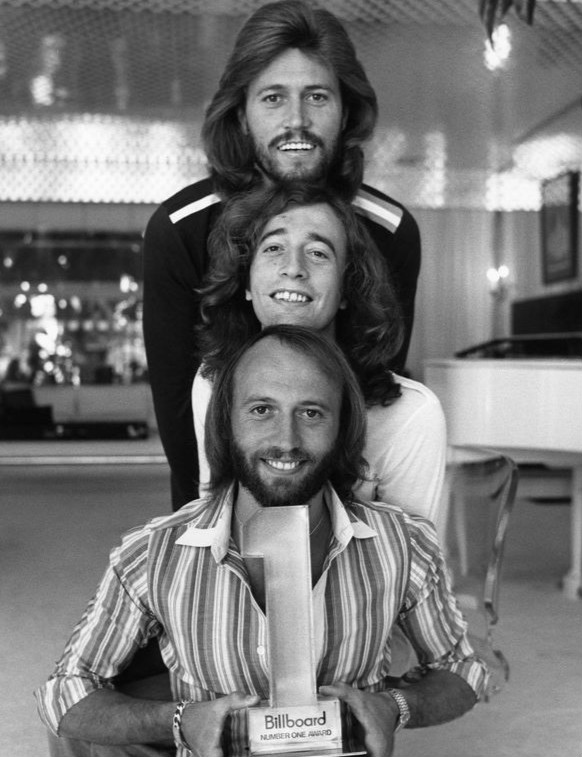
The Bee Gees ended the year at number one.

Chart history
Issue date	Title	Artist(s)	Ref.
January 1	"Torn Between Two Lovers"	Mary MacGregor	
January 8	"Weekend in New England"	Barry Manilow	
January 15	"Evergreen (Love Theme from A Star Is Born)"	Barbra Streisand	
January 22	"Evergreen (Love Theme from A Star Is Born)"	Barbra Streisand	
January 29	"Evergreen (Love Theme from A Star Is Born)"	Barbra Streisand	
February 5	"Evergreen (Love Theme from A Star Is Born)"	Barbra Streisand	
February 12	"Evergreen (Love Theme from A Star Is Born)"	Barbra Streisand	
February 19	"Evergreen (Love Theme from A Star Is Born)"	Barbra Streisand	
February 26	"Southern Nights"	Glen Campbell	
March 5	"Southern Nights"	Glen Campbell	
March 12	"Sam"	Olivia Newton-John	
March 19	"Sam"	Olivia Newton-John	
March 26	"Southern Nights"	Glen Campbell	
April 2	"Southern Nights"	Glen Campbell	
April 9	"Don't Give Up on Us"	David Soul	
April 16	"Right Time of the Night"	Jennifer Warnes	
April 23	"When I Need You"	Leo Sayer	
April 30	"Hello Stranger"	Yvonne Elliman	
May 7	"Hello Stranger"	Yvonne Elliman	
May 14	"Hello Stranger"	Yvonne Elliman	
May 21	"Hello Stranger"	Yvonne Elliman	
May 28	"Margaritaville"	Jimmy Buffett	
June 4	"Looks Like We Made It"	Barry Manilow	
June 11	"Looks Like We Made It"	Barry Manilow	
June 18	"Looks Like We Made It"	Barry Manilow	
June 25	"It's Sad to Belong"	England Dan & John Ford Coley	
July 2	"It's Sad to Belong"	England Dan & John Ford Coley	
July 9	"It's Sad to Belong"	England Dan & John Ford Coley	
July 16	"It's Sad to Belong"	England Dan & John Ford Coley	
July 23	"It's Sad to Belong"	England Dan & John Ford Coley	
July 30	"My Heart Belongs to Me"	Barbra Streisand	
August 6	"My Heart Belongs to Me"	Barbra Streisand	
August 13	"My Heart Belongs to Me"	Barbra Streisand	
August 20	"My Heart Belongs to Me"	Barbra Streisand	
August 27	"Sunflower"	Glen Campbell	
September 3	"Handy Man"	James Taylor	
September 10	"Nobody Does It Better"	Carly Simon	
September 17	"Nobody Does It Better"	Carly Simon	
September 24	"Nobody Does It Better"	Carly Simon	
October 1	"Nobody Does It Better"	Carly Simon	
October 8	"Nobody Does It Better"	Carly Simon	
October 15	"Nobody Does It Better"	Carly Simon	
October 22	"Nobody Does It Better"	Carly Simon	
October 29	"Just Remember I Love You"	Firefall	
November 5	"Just Remember I Love You"	Firefall	
November 12	"We're All Alone"	Rita Coolidge	
November 19	"You Light Up My Life"	Debby Boone	
November 26	"How Deep Is Your Love"	Bee Gees	
December 3	"How Deep Is Your Love"	Bee Gees	
December 10	"How Deep Is Your Love"	Bee Gees	
December 17	"How Deep Is Your Love"	Bee Gees	
December 24	"How Deep Is Your Love"	Bee Gees	
December 31	"How Deep Is Your Love"	Bee Gees	

== See also ==
- 1977 in music
- List of artists who reached number one on the U.S. Adult Contemporary chart
