= Prisoner (Love Theme from Eyes of Laura Mars) =

Single by Barbra Streisand

from the album Eyes Of Laura Mars
- B-side: "Laura & Neville"
- Released: July 1978
- Genre: Soft rock
- Length: 3:54
- Label: Columbia Records
- Songwriters: Karen Lawrence; John DeSautels
- Producer: Gary Klein

Barbra Streisand singles chronology
"Songbird" (1978)	"Prisoner (Love Theme from Eyes of Laura Mars)" (1978)	"You Don't Bring Me Flowers" (1978)

"Prisoner (Love Theme from Eyes of Laura Mars)" is a song recorded by American singer Barbra Streisand in 1978 specifically for the film Eyes of Laura Mars.

== Overview ==
The song was written by Karen Lawrence and John DeSautels, and produced by Gary Klein. It was first recorded by Lawrence and DeSautels's band L.A. Jets, released as a single in 1976 and charting at #86 on the Billboard Hot 100. Initially, it was assumed that Streisand would play the main role in the film Eyes of Laura Mars, but she refused the role, limiting herself to recording the song.

The song was released as a single in July 1978 along with a film's soundtracks, the film itself was released in early August. The song peaked at number 21 on the Billboard Hot 100 and at number 48 on the Adult Contemporary chart.

== Charts ==
Chart (1978)	Peak position
Canada Top Singles (RPM)	48
Canada Adult Contemporary (RPM)	28
US Billboard Hot 100	21
US Adult Contemporary (Billboard)	48
US (Cash Box Top 100)	35
