= Sunflower (Glen Campbell song) =

Single by Glen Campbell

from the album Southern Nights
- B-side: "How High Did We Go"
- Released: June 20, 1977
- Genre: Country pop
- Length: 2:50
- Label: Capitol 4445
- Songwriter: Neil Diamond
- Producers: Gary Klein; Glen Campbell

Glen Campbell singles chronology
"Southern Nights" (1977)	"Sunflower" (1977)	"God Must Have Blessed America" (1977)

"Sunflower" is a song written by Neil Diamond and recorded by American country music singer Glen Campbell. It was released in June 1977 as the second single from Campbell's 1977 album, Southern Nights. "Sunflower" was the last of eight number ones on the Easy Listening chart for Campbell. The single spent one week at number one and peaked at number 39 on the Billboard Hot 100. "Sunflower" peaked at number four on the US country chart.

Neil Diamond did not release his own version of this song until late 2018, when it was included the release of his 50th Anniversary Collectors Edition 6-CD set.

== Chart performance ==
=== Weekly charts ===
Chart (1977)	Peak position
Canada Adult Contemporary (RPM)	4
Canada Top Singles (RPM)	37
Canada Country Singles (RPM)	7
New Zealand	34
US Billboard Hot 100	39
US Hot Country Songs (Billboard)	4
US Billboard Easy Listening	1
West Germany (GfK)	19

=== Year-end charts ===
Chart (1977)	Position
US Adult Contemporary (Billboard)	36
US Hot Country Songs (Billboard)	46

== See also ==
- List of number-one adult contemporary singles of 1977 (U.S.)
