= Forever in Blue Jeans =

Single by Neil Diamond

from the album You Don't Bring Me Flowers
- B-side: "Remember Me"
- Released: January 16, 1979
- Genre: Soft rock, country pop
- Length: 3:30
- Label: Columbia
- Songwriters: Richard Bennett, Neil Diamond
- Producer: Bob Gaudio

Neil Diamond singles chronology
"You Don't Bring Me Flowers" (1978)	"Forever in Blue Jeans" (1979)	"Say Maybe" (1979)

"Forever in Blue Jeans" is a song by Neil Diamond which he co-wrote with his guitarist Richard Bennett. The up-tempo track was released as a single by Columbia in February 1979, having featured on Diamond's album You Don't Bring Me Flowers which was released the previous year. Diamond said about the song: "the simple things are really the important things". It peaked at No. 20 on the Billboard Hot 100 chart and No. 2 on the Easy Listening chart in March 1979.

Cash Box called the song "a pleasant tribute to 'doing OK' without the glitter of wealth and fame" and said that it has "a restrained carnival mood and solid jaunty rhythmic underpinning" and that Diamond's vocals are "gruff" and "appealing."

Later in 1979, Tommy Overstreet recorded a country version of the song, on his I'll Never Let You Down album.

== In popular culture ==
On season 7 of American Idol, Jason Castro sang this song.It was Week 11 and there were only 5 contestants left for what was Neil Diamond week.

== Charts ==
Chart (1979)	Peak position
Canada (RPM)	10
Ireland (IRMA)	4
New Zealand (Recorded Music NZ)	22
South Africa (Springbok)	7
UK Singles (Official Charts Company)	16
US Billboard Hot 100	20
US Adult Contemporary (Billboard)	2
US Hot Country Songs (Billboard)	73
West Germany (Official German Charts)	31

== Certifications ==
Region	Certification	Certified units/sales
New Zealand (RMNZ)	Platinum	30,000^{‡}
United Kingdom (BPI)	Gold	400,000^{‡}
^{‡} Sales+streaming figures based on certification alone.
