= Sandy Farina =

American singer and songwriter (1955–2023)

- Born: July 16, 1955
- Died: November 15, 2023 (aged 68)
- Occupations: Singer; songwriter

Sandra Farina (July 16, 1955 – November 15, 2023) was an American singer-songwriter, best known for her role in the film Sgt. Pepper's Lonely Hearts Club Band. She also wrote the song "Kiss Me in the Rain" for Barbra Streisand (which appeared on Streisand's album Wet). She was a Star Search contestant in 1985, and the following year was co-lead vocalist on the "Hands Across America" charity single. She was also a session singer for television commercials. Farina died on November 15, 2023, at the age of 68.

== Filmography ==
- 1978 – Sgt. Pepper's Lonely Hearts Club Band - Plays Strawberry Fields and sings : Here Comes The Sun, Strawberry Fields Forever, When I'm 64 & Sgt. Pepper's Lonely Hearts Club Band (Finale).
- 1984 – Toxic (The Toxic Avenger) - Performs Body Talk
- 1987 – Electric Blue - Performs The Pride Is Back

== Discography ==
Album:

- 1980 – All Alone In The Night

Singles:

- 1980 – All Alone In The Night/All Alone In The Night
- 1984 – Temptation/Fly Boy Fly

Writer:

- 1979 – Kiss Me in the Rain Barbra Streisand's album Wet - Words: Sandy Farina Music: Lisa Ratner.
- 1979 – Kiss Me In the Rain" / "I Ain't Gonna Cry Tonight
