= Songbird (Barbra Streisand song) =

Single by Barbra Streisand

from the album Songbird
- B-side: "Honey Can I Put on Your Clothes"
- Released: 1978
- Studio: Sound Labs, Inc. (Los Angeles, CA)
- Genre: Pop
- Length: 3:46
- Label: Columbia
- Songwriters: Dave Wolfert; Stephen Nelson
- Producer: Gary Klein

Barbra Streisand singles chronology
"My Heart Belongs to Me" (1977)	"Songbird" (1978)	"Prisoner (Love Theme from Eyes of Laura Mars)" (1978)

"Songbird" is the title track and first single released from Barbra Streisand's 1978 album Songbird. It was written by Dave Wolfert and Steve Nelson and produced by Gary Klein.

On the Billboard Hot 100 chart, the song peaked at number 25. It spent two weeks atop the Billboard easy listening chart in July and August 1978, her fifth song to accomplish this feat.

One theory as to why "Songbird" was less successful on the U.S. pop chart is that Streisand recorded the theme to the 1978 film Eyes of Laura Mars, which was released as a single a few weeks after "Songbird" came out. "Prisoner (Love Theme from Eyes of Laura Mars)" reached number 21 on the Billboard Hot 100 and may have created competition with herself for pop radio airplay and single sales.

== Charts ==
Chart (1978)	Peak position
Australia (Kent Music Report)	92
Canada Top Singles (RPM)	33
Canada Adult Contemporary (RPM)	1
US Billboard Hot 100	25
US Adult Contemporary (Billboard)	1
US (Cash Box Top 100)	33

== See also ==
- List of number-one adult contemporary singles of 1978 (U.S.)
