= You Don't Bring Me Flowers (album) =

Studio album by Neil Diamond
- Released: November 3, 1978
- Recorded: 1978
- Studios: Sunset Sound (Los Angeles); A&M (Hollywood); Cherokee (Los Angeles); Indigo Ranch (Malibu)
- Genre: Pop
- Length: 41:45
- Label: Columbia
- Producer: Bob Gaudio

Neil Diamond chronology
I'm Glad You're Here with Me Tonight (1977)	You Don't Bring Me Flowers (1978)	September Morn (1979)

Singles from You Don't Bring Me Flowers
- 1. "You Don't Bring Me Flowers" Released: October 1978; 2. "Forever in Blue Jeans" Released: January 1979; 3. "Say Maybe" Released: April 1979; 4. "The American Popular Song" Released: May 1979 (UK)

You Don't Bring Me Flowers is Neil Diamond's twelfth studio album. It was released in 1978 to capitalize on the success of the title song of the same name, a duet with Barbra Streisand, which had originally appeared as a solo recording on Diamond's previous album, I'm Glad You're Here with Me Tonight.

== Critical reception ==
Professional ratings
Review scores
Source	Rating
AllMusic	4/5 stars
The Rolling Stone Album Guide	2/5 stars

Cash Box said that of the single "Say Maybe" that it has a slight country and western flavor, and that "Diamond's entrancing vocal is strong." Record World said that "clever arrangement and full-bodied production accentuate the lovely background vocal chorus."

== Track listing ==
Side one
No.	Title	Writer(s)	Length
1.	"The American Popular Song"	Tom Hensley	5:16
2.	"Forever in Blue Jeans"	Richard Bennett, Neil Diamond	3:39
3.	"Remember Me"	Diamond	5:03
4.	"You've Got Your Troubles"	Roger Cook, Roger Greenaway	3:53
5.	"You Don't Bring Me Flowers" (Duet with Barbra Streisand)	Diamond, Alan Bergman, Marilyn Bergman	3:17

Side two
No.	Title	Writer(s)	Length
1.	"The Dancing Bumble Bee / Bumble Boogie"	Diamond / Jack Fina	4:54
2.	"Mothers and Daughters, Fathers and Sons"	Bob Gaudio, Judy Parker	4:11
3.	"Memphis Flyer"	Diamond	3:11
4.	"Say Maybe"	Diamond	4:07
5.	"Diamond Girls"	Diamond	3:36

== Personnel ==
- Produced by Bob Gaudio
- Neil Diamond - vocals, possible guitar
- The Neil Diamond Band:
  - Dennis St. John - Drums
  - Richard Bennett - Acoustic and Electric Guitars
  - Alan Lindgren - Synthesizer / Piano
  - King Errisson - Percussion
  - Reinie Press - Bass
  - Tom Hensley - Piano and Keyboards
  - Linda Press - Vocals
  - Doug Rhone - Guitar
  - Vince Charles - Percussion
- Orchestra arranged and conducted by Alan Lindgren on:
  - You Don't Bring Me Flowers
  - Remember Me
  - You've Got Your Troubles
  - Diamond Girls
  - The Dancing Bumble Bee/Bumble Boogie
- Orchestra arranged and conducted by Tom Hensley on:
  - The American Popular Song
  - Forever in Blue Jeans
  - Mothers and Daughters, Fathers and Sons
- Vocal Arrangements by Bob Gaudio
- Background Vocals:
  - Maxine Willard Waters
  - Julia Tillman Waters - Courtesy of Warner Bros. Records, Inc.
  - Venetta Fields, Tom Bahler, Ron Hicklin, Jon Joyce, Gene Morford, Doug Rhone, H.L. Voelker

== Charts ==
=== Weekly charts ===
Chart (1978–1979)	Peak position
Australian Albums (Kent Music Report)	5
Canada Top Albums/CDs (RPM)	4
Dutch Albums (Album Top 100)	7
German Albums (Offizielle Top 100)	38
New Zealand Albums (RMNZ)	2
UK Albums (Official Charts)	15
US Billboard 200	4

=== Year-end charts ===
Chart (1979)	Position
New Zealand Albums (RMNZ)	38

== Certifications ==
Certifications for You Don't Bring Me Flowers
Region	Certification	Certified units/sales
Canada (Music Canada)	2× Platinum	200,000^{^}
New Zealand (RMNZ)	Platinum	15,000^{^}
United Kingdom (BPI)	Gold	100,000^{^}
United States (RIAA)	2× Platinum	2,000,000^{^}
^{^} Shipments figures based on certification alone.
