= List of Billboard 200 number-one albums of 1979 =

These are the Billboard magazine number-one albums of 1979, per the Billboard 200.

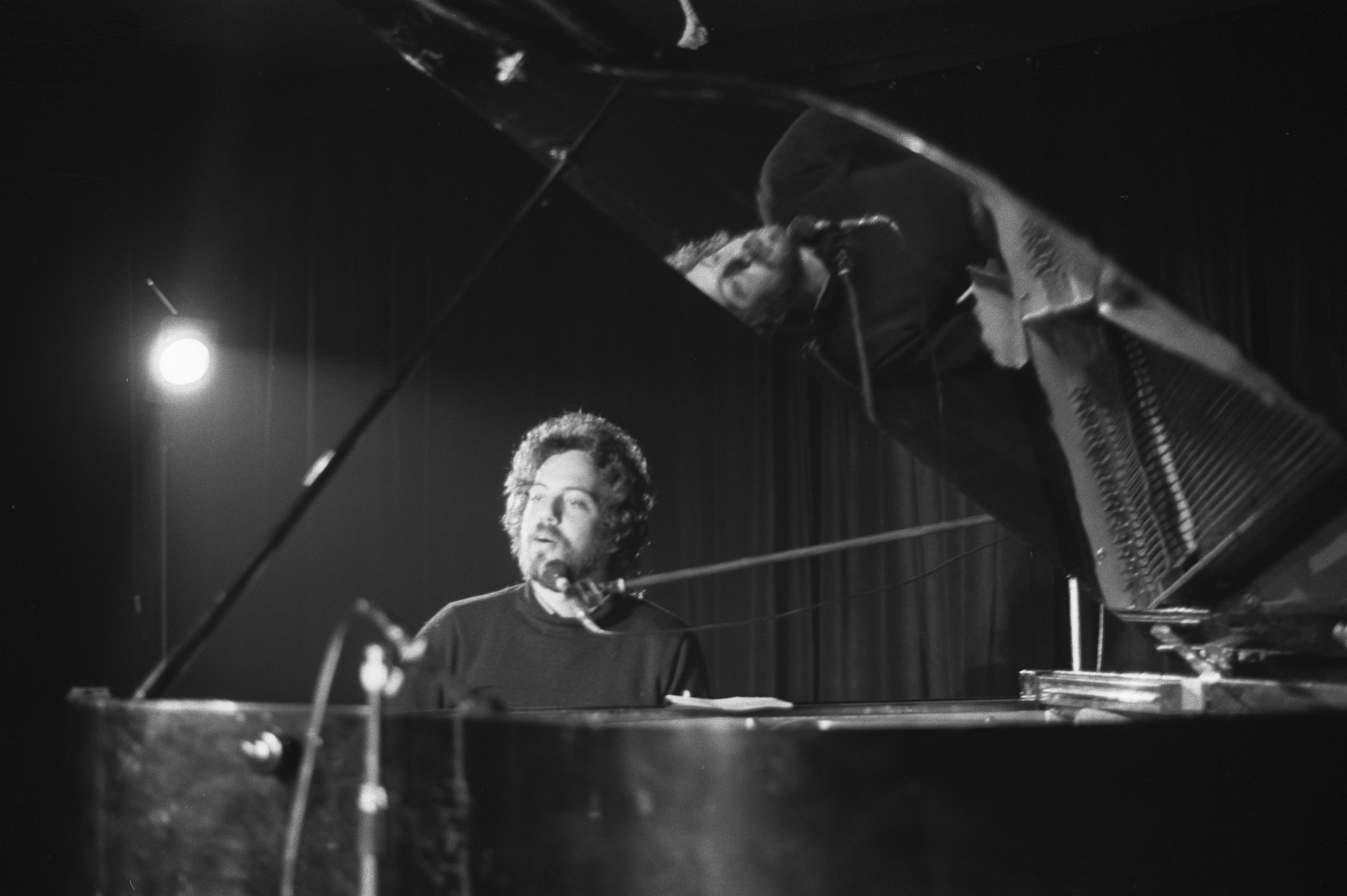
Though only spending one week at number one that year, Billy Joel's 52nd Street was the best-selling album of 1979. The album had previously spent seven weeks at number one in 1978.

== Chart history ==
Key
| † | Indicates best performing album of 1979 |

| Issue date | Album | Artist(s) | Label | Ref. |
|---|---|---|---|---|
| January 6 | Barbra Streisand's Greatest Hits Vol. 2 | Barbra Streisand | Columbia | |
| January 13 | Barbra Streisand's Greatest Hits Vol. 2 | Barbra Streisand | Columbia | |
| January 20 | Barbra Streisand's Greatest Hits Vol. 2 | Barbra Streisand | Columbia | |
| January 27 | 52nd Street † | Billy Joel | Columbia | |
| February 3 | Briefcase Full of Blues | Blues Brothers | Atlantic | |
| February 10 | Blondes Have More Fun | Rod Stewart | Warner Bros. | |
| February 17 | Blondes Have More Fun | Rod Stewart | Warner Bros. | |
| February 24 | Blondes Have More Fun | Rod Stewart | Warner Bros. | |
| March 3 | Spirits Having Flown | Bee Gees | RSO | |
| March 10 | Spirits Having Flown | Bee Gees | RSO | |
| March 17 | Spirits Having Flown | Bee Gees | RSO | |
| March 24 | Spirits Having Flown | Bee Gees | RSO | |
| March 31 | Spirits Having Flown | Bee Gees | RSO | |
| April 7 | Minute by Minute | Doobie Brothers | Warner Bros. | |
| April 14 | Minute by Minute | Doobie Brothers | Warner Bros. | |
| April 21 | Spirits Having Flown | Bee Gees | RSO | |
| April 28 | Minute by Minute | Doobie Brothers | Warner Bros. | |
| May 5 | Minute by Minute | Doobie Brothers | Warner Bros. | |
| May 12 | Minute by Minute | Doobie Brothers | Warner Bros. | |
| May 19 | Breakfast in America | Supertramp | A&M | |
| May 26 | Breakfast in America | Supertramp | A&M | |
| June 2 | Breakfast in America | Supertramp | A&M | |
| June 9 | Breakfast in America | Supertramp | A&M | |
| June 16 | Bad Girls | Donna Summer | Casablanca | |
| June 23 | Breakfast in America | Supertramp | A&M | |
| June 30 | Breakfast in America | Supertramp | A&M | |
| July 7 | Bad Girls | Donna Summer | Casablanca | |
| July 14 | Bad Girls | Donna Summer | Casablanca | |
| July 21 | Bad Girls | Donna Summer | Casablanca | |
| July 28 | Bad Girls | Donna Summer | Casablanca | |
| August 4 | Bad Girls | Donna Summer | Casablanca | |
| August 11 | Get the Knack | The Knack | Capitol | |
| August 18 | Get the Knack | The Knack | Capitol | |
| August 25 | Get the Knack | The Knack | Capitol | |
| September 1 | Get the Knack | The Knack | Capitol | |
| September 8 | Get the Knack | The Knack | Capitol | |
| September 15 | In Through the Out Door | Led Zeppelin | Swan Song | |
| September 22 | In Through the Out Door | Led Zeppelin | Swan Song | |
| September 29 | In Through the Out Door | Led Zeppelin | Swan Song | |
| October 6 | In Through the Out Door | Led Zeppelin | Swan Song | |
| October 13 | In Through the Out Door | Led Zeppelin | Swan Song | |
| October 20 | In Through the Out Door | Led Zeppelin | Swan Song | |
| October 27 | In Through the Out Door | Led Zeppelin | Swan Song | |
| November 3 | The Long Run | Eagles | Asylum | |
| November 10 | The Long Run | Eagles | Asylum | |
| November 17 | The Long Run | Eagles | Asylum | |
| November 24 | The Long Run | Eagles | Asylum | |
| December 1 | The Long Run | Eagles | Asylum | |
| December 8 | The Long Run | Eagles | Asylum | |
| December 15 | The Long Run | Eagles | Asylum | |
| December 22 | The Long Run | Eagles | Asylum | |
| December 29 | The Long Run | Eagles | Asylum | |

== See also ==
- 1979 in music
- List of number-one albums (United States)
