= Comin' In and Out of Your Life =

Single by Barbra Streisand

from the album Memories
- B-side: "Lost Inside of You"
- Released: November 1981
- Recorded: September 1981
- Studio: CBS Studios (London, England)
- Length: 4:10
- Label: Columbia
- Songwriters: Richard Parker; Bobby Whiteside
- Producer: Andrew Lloyd Webber

Barbra Streisand singles chronology
"Promises" (1981)	"Comin' In and Out of Your Life" (1981)	"Memory" (1982)

"Comin' In and Out of Your Life" is a 1981 single released by Barbra Streisand on her album Memories. It reached number eleven on the Billboard Hot 100 record chart in early 1982. It peaked at number two on the adult contemporary chart in the U.S. and hit number one on the Canadian adult contemporary chart. In the lyrics, the singer realizes that her relationship with someone she loves will always be only casual. While she wants a more permanent commitment, she will only be "coming in and out" of his life.

== Production ==
Milwaukee native Richard Parker worked with Bobby Whiteside to create commercial jingles for a while, and then decided to use their musical hook skills to collaborate on a pop hit. Parker explained "we went into the studio and recorded a very complete demo with string arrangement and everything. some established artists were interested but we felt the song was just too strong to let go". Whiteside managed Parker's singing career and thought the song was the "perfect vehicle to land Richard a contract with a major record label". Whiteside sent the tape to an L.A. partner Jay Landers, who then sent it to Charles Koppelman.

Landers explained "I knew [Streisand] a little bit. We met through Charles Koppelman, who...was her Executive Producer at the time. I was an independent music publisher, and Charles asked me to find some material for a compilation he was working on with her, which became Memories. (I think it was called "Love Songs" in the UK.) So I brought her "Comin’ In And Out Of Your Life," which was a song I’d come across a few months earlier. Parker said "Koppelman was so knocked out by it that he sent a limousine for Jon Peters. Ten days later Barbra recorded our song in London. It all happened so fast". Parker later explained "having Barbra Streisand do the song automatically legitimized our standing as songwriters".

== Release ==
The song was released in mid-November by Columbia Records, and as of December 4, 1981, had already become a Top 30 single. It went on to peak at number eleven in early 1982. The song was listed at number 74 on the "Billboard Year-End Hot 100 singles of 1982." It was included on Streisand's greatest hits album Memories.

== Critical reception ==
The song was voted the favorite adult contemporary song in the Wilmington area according to surveys by WMFD radio on January 1, 1982. On November 27, 1981, the song was 10th in the same list. Streisand considers this distinction amongst her very greatest achievements.

== Chart performance ==
Chart (1981–1982)	Peak position
Canadian RPM Top Singles	24
Canadian RPM Adult Contemporary	1
Spain Top 40 Radio	31
UK Singles (Official Charts)	66
US Billboard Hot 100	11
US Adult Contemporary (Billboard)	2
US Cash Box Top 100 Singles	9

Year-end chart (1982)	Rank
US Top Pop Singles (Billboard)	74
