= The Main Event/Fight =

Single by Barbra Streisand

from the album The Main Event
- B-side: "The Main Event/Fight (instrumental)"
- Released: June 1979
- Genre: Disco
- Length: 4:04 (7" radio edit); 4:51 (short album version); 11:35 (12"/long album version)
- Label: Columbia
- Songwriters: Paul Jabara; Bruce Roberts
- Producer: Bob Esty

Barbra Streisand singles chronology
"Superman" (1979)	"The Main Event/Fight" (1979)	"No More Tears (Enough Is Enough) (with Donna Summer)" (1979)

"The Main Event/Fight" is a 1979 medley recorded by Barbra Streisand. The song is the title track and only single issued from the soundtrack of the film The Main Event starring Streisand and Ryan O'Neal. The song became the first of two major disco-styled hits for Streisand, the other being "No More Tears (Enough Is Enough)", a duet with Donna Summer later the same year. Both songs were written by Paul Jabara and Bruce Roberts.

Record World said that it "exhibits Barbra's stylish vocals adorning a punchy disco beat".

"The Main Event/Fight" spent four weeks at number three on the US Billboard Hot 100. In Canada it reached number five. It was also a major Adult Contemporary hit, reaching number two and number one in those nations, respectively. The song did not chart outside North America and was largely left out of recurrent rotation, having among the highest amount of drop-off in radio airplay of the hits of 1979 (Streisand's other singles of that year also fared poorly in maintaining airplay).

== Charts ==
=== Weekly charts ===
Chart (1979)	Peak position
Canada Top Singles (RPM)	5
Canada Adult Contemporary (RPM)	1
US Billboard Hot 100	3
US Adult Contemporary (Billboard)	2
US Dance (Billboard)	13
US Cash Box Top 100	3

=== Year-end charts ===
Chart (1979)	Rank
Canada (RPM Top 200 Singles)	74
US Billboard Hot 100	35
US Cash Box Top 100	25

== Certifications ==
Region	Certification	Certified units/sales
United States (RIAA)	Gold	1,000,000^{^}
^{^} Shipments figures based on certification alone.
