= September Morn (album) =

Studio album by Neil Diamond
- Released: December 1979
- Recorded: 1979
- Studios: A&M (Hollywood); Arch Angel (Hollywood); Cherokee (Hollywood); Dawnbreaker (San Fernando); Indigo Ranch (Malibu); Sunset Sound (Hollywood)
- Genres: Rock, pop
- Length: 37:45
- Label: Columbia
- Producer: Bob Gaudio

Neil Diamond chronology
You Don't Bring Me Flowers (1978)	September Morn (1979)	The Jazz Singer (1980)

September Morn is the thirteenth studio album by the American singer-songwriter Neil Diamond. Released in 1979, the album includes a disco version of the Motown song "Dancing in the Street" and a re-recording of "I'm a Believer".

The title track was an international chart hit, and became Diamond's 30th Top 40 hit in the U.S. The song peaked at number 17 on the U.S. Billboard Hot 100, number 14 on the Cash Box Top 100, and number 7 on Record World. In Canada, it peaked at number 15. The song was a much bigger hit on the Adult Contemporary charts, reaching number two in the U.S. and spending two weeks at number one in Canada. "September Morn'" ranks as the 90th biggest U.S. charting single of 1980.

== Critical reception ==
Professional ratings
Review scores
Source	Rating
The Rolling Stone Album Guide	1/5 stars

Cash Box called "September Morn" a "lushly orchestrated ballad [that] builds from a simple piano line to a full-blown chorus." Record World praised Diamond's "awesome vocal talent." The Boston Globe concluded that "the usual fire-and-brimstone Diamond seems a bit too subdued here."

== Track listing ==
Side one
No.	Title	Writer(s)	Length
1.	"September Morn"	Gilbert Bécaud, Neil Diamond	3:51
2.	"Mama Don't Know"	Bécaud, Diamond	3:55
3.	"That Kind"	Carole Bayer Sager, Diamond	3:18
4.	"Jazz Time"	Diamond, Tom Hensley	3:30
5.	"The Good Lord Loves You"	Richard Fagan	4:42

Side two
No.	Title	Writer(s)	Length
1.	"Dancing in the Street"	Ivy Jo Hunter, Marvin Gaye, William "Mickey" Stevenson	4:09
2.	"The Shelter of Your Arms"	Jerry Samuels	4:05
3.	"I'm a Believer"	Diamond	2:23
4.	"The Sun Ain't Gonna Shine Anymore"	Bob Crewe, Bob Gaudio	3:39
5.	"Stagger Lee"	Harold Logan, Lloyd Price	4:10

== Personnel ==
- Neil Diamond – vocals, guitar
- Tom Hensley – piano, keyboards
- Bob Gaudio – piano
- Alan Lindgren – piano, synthesizers
- Reinie Press – bass guitar
- Doug Rhone, Richard Bennett – guitar
- Dennis St. John – drums
- King Errisson, Vince Charles – percussion
- Lou McCreary, Arthur Maebe, Dennis Smith, Graham Young, Henry Sigismonte, Jerry Hey, Lloyd Ulyate, Tommy Johnson, Vincent DeRosa, Warren Luning, Chuck Findley, Dick Hyde, Ernie Watts, Pete Christlieb, Steve Madaio – horns
- Sid Sharp – concertmaster
- Linda Press, Becky Lopez Lewis, Julia Tillman Waters, Maxine Willard Waters, Sherlie Matthews, Venetta Fields – background vocals

== Charts ==
Chart (1979–1980)	Peak position
Australian Albums (Kent Music Report)	3
Austrian Albums (Ö3 Austria)	13
Canada Top Albums/CDs (RPM)	13
Dutch Albums (Album Top 100)	17
German Albums (Offizielle Top 100)	28
New Zealand Albums (RMNZ)	3
UK Albums (Official Charts)	14
US Billboard 200	10

== Certifications ==
Region	Certification	Certified units/sales
Australia (ARIA)	Platinum	50,000^{^}
New Zealand (RMNZ)	Gold	7,500^{^}
United Kingdom (BPI)	Gold	100,000^{^}
United States (RIAA)	Platinum	1,000,000^{^}
^{^} Shipments figures based on certification alone.
