= You Don't Bring Me Flowers =

Single by Barbra Streisand and Neil Diamond

from the album You Don't Bring Me Flowers and Barbra Streisand's Greatest Hits Vol. 2
- A-side: "You Don't Bring Me Flowers (duet)"
- B-side: "You Don't Bring Me Flowers (instrumental)"
- Released: October 1978
- Studio: Cherokee (Hollywood)
- Length: 3:25
- Label: Columbia
- Songwriters: Neil Diamond; Alan and Marilyn Bergman
- Producer: Bob Gaudio

Barbra Streisand singles chronology
"Prisoner (Love Theme from Eyes of Laura Mars)" (1978)	"You Don't Bring Me Flowers" (1978)	"Superman" (1979)

Neil Diamond singles chronology
"Desiree" (1977)	"You Don't Bring Me Flowers" (1978)	"Forever in Blue Jeans" (1979)

Audio
- "You Don't Bring Me Flowers" on YouTube

"You Don't Bring Me Flowers" is a song written by Neil Diamond with Alan and Marilyn Bergman for the daily TV sitcom All That Glitters. The song was intended to be the theme song, but Norman Lear, the show's creator, changed the concept of the show and the song was no longer appropriate. Diamond then expanded the track from 45 seconds to 3:17, adding instrumental sections and an additional verse. The Bergmans contributed to the song's lyrics, which tell the story of two lovers who have drifted apart while they "go through the motions" and heartache of life together.

Diamond released a solo rendition of the song on his 1977 album I'm Glad You're Here with Me Tonight, and Barbra Streisand covered the solo version for her Songbird album early in 1978. These two recordings were spliced together by different radio stations, creating unofficial duets to great success, prompting the two artists into the studio together for an official duet recording, which reached the top of the Billboard Hot 100 in December 1978.

== Origins of the duet ==
The roots of the duet version, as chronicled in myriad Streisand and Diamond biographies as well as Streisand's Just for the Record... box set, revolve around WAKY (AM) Louisville, KY, program director, Gary Guthrie, who spliced the two solo tracks together as a going-away present to his wife, Becky, whom he was in the process of divorcing. Guthrie's spliced-together duet version first aired on WAKY on May 24, 1978.

This was not Guthrie's first foray into combining recordings, however. When he was the program director at KTFM (FM), San Antonio, TX, he had spliced together verses from both the English and Spanish versions of Captain & Tennille's "Love Will Keep Us Together" and America's "Sister Golden Hair" in an effort to enhance the uniqueness of KTFM and its sister station KTSA (AM).

As the real-life story behind the song unfolded, it triggered a media buzz worldwide, from Good Morning America and People magazine to the BBC. Meanwhile, a different version was prepared by Chicago's WGN radio personality Roy Leonard and producer Peter Marino. Streisand's album was placed on one turntable and Diamond's on another, and the recording was mixed 'live'. They began with Streisand singing and Diamond's vocal followed. Streisand and Diamond repeated the same lyrics back and forth to each other—there weren't any edits, and the recording was mixed in one take. The Roy Leonard Show version became so popular that years after Columbia Records released their official duet, listeners continued to call in requesting to hear the WGN version.

Radio personalities Jack Hood and Gene Kruszewski of WJR (AM)/Detroit also created a duet version of the song, which was a local and regional hit and helped escalate the song's novelty.

Interest in the unofficial versions of the duet caused a clamor on the retail level, as the song was commercially unavailable as a duet. Guthrie sent CBS his version of the duet on July 27, and by August 3, both Streisand and Diamond had agreed to the release of a duet version. However, rather than issue any of the spliced-together versions, Columbia Records had Streisand and Diamond record a brand-new "official" studio version, which was released on October 17, 1978. The song reached number one on the Hot 100 chart for two non-consecutive weeks in December 1978, producing the third number-one hit for both singers. The single sold over one million copies and eventually went Platinum.

Record World said that "the song is perfect for both vocalists."

In 1979, Guthrie sued CBS for $5 million, claiming that he was improperly compensated for his role in making the song a hit. The parties reached an out-of-court settlement. Acknowledgment and gratitude for Guthrie also came from CBS with a gold record plaque, flowers from Diamond, and a telegram from Streisand.

Columbia also presented gold records to both Leonard and Marino, for creating the WGN version, and to Hood and Kruszewski for their WJR version. The solo versions had also drawn attention from other radio stations, resulting in other radio personalities receiving recognition for helping to increase the popularity of a “spliced” duet, further contributing to the decision to create an official duet.

The duo performed the song – announced – to close the 1980 Grammy Awards show, a performance released on the 1994 album Grammy's Greatest Moments Volume I. The story of how it happened was recalled by Alicia Keys on the CBS network television special, My Night at the Grammys, which aired on November 30, 2007. Keys said, “It might very well have been the first Grammy moment ... they [had] never performed the song “live” together, so on February 27, 1980, the lights dimmed at the Shrine Auditorium and Barbra and Neil took the stage to sing one of the classic television duets of all time.”

Diamond and Streisand had planned to star in a motion picture based on the song, but such plans were cancelled when Diamond starred in a remake of The Jazz Singer (1980).

== Chart history ==
=== Weekly charts ===
Chart (1978–1979)	Peak position
Australia (Kent Music Report)	4
Belgium (Ultratop 50 Flanders)	17
Canada Top Singles (RPM)	1
Canada Adult Contemporary (RPM)	1
Ireland (IRMA)	14
Netherlands (Single Top 100)	14
New Zealand (Recorded Music NZ)	3
South Africa (Springbok)	13
Spain	17
UK Singles (Official Charts)	5
US Billboard Hot 100	1
US Adult Contemporary (Billboard)	3
US Hot Country Songs (Billboard)	70
US Cash Box Top 100	1

=== Year-end charts ===
Chart (1978)	Rank
Australia (Kent Music Report)	89
Canada	61
US Cash Box	66

Chart (1979)	Rank
Australia (Kent Music Report)	33
Canada	119
US Billboard Hot 100	21

== Certifications ==
Region	Certification	Certified units/sales
Australia (ARIA)	Platinum	100,000^{^}
Canada (Music Canada)	Gold	75,000^{^}
New Zealand (RMNZ)	Gold	10,000^{*}
United Kingdom (BPI)	Gold	500,000^{^}
United States (RIAA)	Platinum	1,000,000^{^}
^{*} Sales figures based on certification alone.^{^} Shipments figures based on certification alone.

== Jim Ed Brown and Helen Cornelius version ==
Concurrent with the success of Diamond and Streisand's version of the song, country singers Jim Ed Brown and Helen Cornelius released a country version of the song on RCA Victor, which reached number ten on the Billboard Hot Country Singles chart in early 1979.

== See also ==
- List of Hot 100 number-one singles of 1978 (U.S.)
