= Karen Lawrence (singer-songwriter) =

American singer-songwriter

Karen Lawrence is an American singer and songwriter who has worked with the L.A. Jets, 1994:, Karen Lawrence and the Pinz, and Blue by Nature. She sang backup vocals on the song "Get It Up" from the Draw the Line album by Aerosmith and sang "Back on the Streets" from the Jeff Beck album Flash.

Having worked as a stage performer since she was nine, she started singing with a blues band at the age of 13. Following this, she was a front woman for the A&M band 1994. Kerrang! wrote "It was 1994's Karen Lawrence who gave the others the choice of being second best or giving up."

In addition to being the lead vocal and writing credits on Jeff Beck's Beckology, Lawrence composed "Prisoner (Love Theme from Eyes of Laura Mars)", performed by Barbra Streisand.

In March 1993, Lawrence and her collaborator of 14 years, rhythm guitarist Fred Hostetler, teamed with Rick Dufay, a former Aerosmith guitarist, to form the band Blue by Nature.

== Other notable performances ==
Karen Lawrence sang the title song of the TV series Misfits of Science.

== Discography ==
- L.A. Jets - L.A. Jets (1976), RCA APL1-1547
- 1994: - 1994 (1978), A&M 4709
- 1994: - Please Stand By (1979), A&M 4769
- Karen Lawrence and the Pinz - Girls Night Out (1981), RCA AFL1-4006
- Karen Lawrence - Rip and Tear (1986), Revolver REVLP 75
- Blue by Nature - Blue to the Bone (1995), SRD 8, Shattered 9
- Blue by Nature - Live at the Lake (1998), Hostel 55
- Blue by Nature - Hard Daze (2000), Hostel 57
