= My Heart Belongs to Me =

Single by Barbra Streisand

from the album Superman
- B-side: "Answer Me"
- Released: May 1977
- Genre: Traditional pop
- Length: 3:21
- Label: Columbia
- Songwriter: Alan Gordon
- Producers: Gary Klein; Charlie Calello

Barbra Streisand singles chronology
"Evergreen (Love Theme from A Star Is Born)" (1977)	"My Heart Belongs to Me" (1977)	"Songbird" (1978)

Audio
- "My Heart Belongs to Me" on YouTube

"My Heart Belongs to Me" is a popular song from 1977 (see 1977 in music). It was originally performed by the songwriter, Alan Gordon, but the more famous version of the song was recorded by American singer and actress Barbra Streisand.

Released as a single from her multi-platinum 1977 album, Superman, "My Heart Belongs to Me" peaked at number four on the Billboard Hot 100 chart the middle of that year. It spent four weeks at number one on the Billboard easy listening chart, Streisand's fourth number-one song on this survey.

The song was originally considered for Streisand's film version of A Star Is Born from the previous year, but it was not included on that project. Charlie Calello, the co-producer of "My Heart Belongs to Me", rehearsed the song with Streisand by playing piano while she sang the lyrics. The instrumental portion of the song was recorded first, then Streisand recorded her vocals along with the orchestration the next day.

== Critical reception ==
Cash Box wrote that the song "is actually more the typical Streisand recording, leaving room for her to soar to the altitudes that only her voice can reach" and that it seems "destined for the upper reaches" of the charts.

== Chart performance ==
=== Weekly charts ===
Chart (1977)	Peak position
US Billboard Hot 100	4
US Billboard Adult Contemporary Tracks	1
US Cash Box Top 100	5
Canadian RPM Top Singles	3
Canadian RPM Adult Contemporary	1

=== Year-end charts ===
Chart (1977)	Rank
Canada	45
US Billboard Hot 100	60
US Billboard Adult Contemporary	4
US Cash Box	66

== See also ==
- List of number-one adult contemporary singles of 1977 (U.S.)
