= The Main Event (1979 film) =

1979 film by Howard Zieff

- Theatrical release poster
- Directed by: Howard Zieff
- Written by: Gail Parent; Andrew Smith
- Produced by: Jon Peters; Barbra Streisand
- Starring: Barbra Streisand; Ryan O'Neal
- Cinematography: Mario Tosi
- Edited by: Edward Warschilka
- Music by: Michael Melvoin
- Production companies: First Artists; Barwood Films
- Distributed by: Warner Bros. Pictures
- Release date: June 22, 1979
- Running time: 112 minutes
- Country: United States
- Language: English
- Budget: $6 million
- Box office: $66 million (worldwide)

The Main Event is a 1979 American sports romantic comedy film starring Barbra Streisand and Ryan O'Neal, written by Gail Parent, directed by Howard Zieff, and produced by Jon Peters and Streisand.

The film received mixed-to-negative reviews from critics, but was among the top 20 highest-grossing films of the year at the box office. It was also the impetus for Streisand's first foray into disco singing the Golden Globe-nominated theme song written by Paul Jabara and Bruce Roberts.

== Plot ==
Perfume magnate Hillary Kramer loses her company and is financially ruined when her accountant embezzles from her and flees to South America. Among her few remaining assets, she finds a management contract with an inactive boxer, purchased as a tax write-off. She decides to force Eddie "Kid Natural" Scanlon, who is now a driving instructor, back into the ring to recover her losses. Eddie thinks this will only get him killed, so he resists but relents. As Eddie's unconventional comeback progresses, he finds himself drawn into conflict and romance with his unlikely manager.

Hillary attempts to train the Kid herself, although she displays a total ignorance of his sport. She reads a ‘how to’ book on boxing to Kid Natural while he practices in the ring. Finding a passage referring to footwork, she says, “I think that means kick him.”

Hillary schemes to make a fortune by staging "the match that never was" with Hector Mantilla. Hector and Kid Natural were both disqualified years before at the Pan Am Games for misconduct before their match. Hector has since become a successful professional boxer. In the final scene, the Kid takes on Hector and is defeating him when Hillary suddenly realizes that if the Kid wins, their partnership will end and she will not see him again. Shockingly, she ends the match by throwing in the towel, runs into the ring, declares her love for the Kid and kisses him as the credits begin to roll.

== Main cast ==
- Barbra Streisand as Hillary Kramer
- Ryan O'Neal as Eddie "Kid Natural" Scanlon
- Paul Sand as David
- Whitman Mayo as Percy
- Patti D'Arbanville as Donna
- Chu Chu Malave as Luis
- Richard Lawson as Hector Mantilla
- James Gregory as Gough

== Production ==
Renee Missell wanted to do a film about a woman who "owned" a boxer. Missell and partner Howard Rosenman set up a deal at MGM under Daniel Melnick and hired Gail Parent and Andrew Smith to write a script. Initially the proposed stars were Nick Nolte and Susan Blakely from Rich Man, Poor Man. Melnick was replaced as head of production by Richard Shepherd who had the script rewritten by Bob Kaufman as a vehicle for Diana Ross and Burt Reynolds.

The film was offered to Ryan O'Neal when Goldie Hawn was going to star. The producers then proposed Diana Ross to appear in the lead, but O'Neal refused. It later was learned that O'Neal and Ross had been in a brief relationship and had an acrimonious split.

Eventually the film was offered to Barbra Streisand. More writers worked on it, including the team of Charles Shyer and Alan Mandal, and original writer Gail Patrick. The project went from MGM to First Artists.

Other titles for the film were Knockout and The Woman and the Boxer.

Filming started in October 1978 with a budget of $7 million.

== Reception ==
=== Box office ===
The Main Event was a box-office success. It opened with $6.6 million grossed from 853 theaters in three days. It grossed a total of $42.8 million against a budget of $8 million. It was the 16th highest-grossing film of 1979.

=== Critical ===
Roger Ebert gave the film 2 stars out of 4 and called it "a meet cute from beginning to end, forced smiles, smarmy dialog and all. Barbra Streisand and Ryan O'Neal act so cute, indeed, that I was squirming." Vincent Canby of The New York Times wrote "This sort of situation could only be funny if it's out of character, and it is out of character for Mr. O'Neal. The pushy cosmetics executive, however, seems to be an extension of the role played in real-life by Miss Streisand, who coproduced the movie, stars in it and seems to have ordered every close-up and line-reading. Miss Streisand has become a contradiction: she's too much without being enough." Dale Pollock of Variety called it "a film whose sum is way less than its parts," adding "Putting aside all of the ridiculous aspects of 'Main Event' (Streisand's glamorous wardrobe on a nickel-and-dime budget, the complete disregard for boxing rules and tradition, and the highly improbable ending), major disappointment is Streisand's apparent contentment to stay with a character she has now exhausted on the screen." Gene Siskel of the Chicago Tribune gave the film 3.5 stars out of 4 and wrote that Streisand "walks away with this film, and turns it into a romantic comedy acting lesson. She is as delightful here as she ever has been, and that includes Funny Girl and a personal favorite, On a Clear Day You Can See Forever." Charles Champlin of the Los Angeles Times wrote of Streisand: "It is her first movie since A Star Is Born and it is all hers. Every entrance, exit, composition and quip favors her, somewhat to the concealment of a suave and ingratiating performance by O'Neal, who really has become an amusing and debonair light comedy actor in a tradition not much honored in 'The Main Event.'" Gary Arnold of The Washington Post wrote "This premise looks remarkably unappealing on paper, and doesn't improve in the playing. New romantic comedies seem to be degenerating at the moment, and 'The Main Event' is nothing to rave about." David Ansen of Newsweek wrote "The stage is set for a knockabout romantic comedy, a sort of rolereversed Pat and Mike. What develops, however, is only fitfully amusing — and sometimes downright annoying".

On the review aggregator website Rotten Tomatoes, 40% of 10 critics' reviews are positive.

== Accolades ==
Golden Globe Awards

- Best Original Song (Paul Jabara and Bruce Roberts for "The Main Event/Fight," nominated

People's Choice Awards, U.S.

- Favorite Theme/Song from a Motion Picture for "The Main Event/Fight", winner

== Soundtrack ==
The Main Event

Soundtrack album by Barbra Streisand / various artists
- Released: June 1979
- Genre: Disco
- Label: Columbia

Barbra Streisand chronology
Barbra Streisand's Greatest Hits Volume 2 (1978)	The Main Event (1979)	Wet (1979)

In June 1979, a soundtrack was released on vinyl, cassette and 8-track tape. It peaked at #20 on Billboard's Top 200 album chart and was certified gold. In October 1993, it was released on CD. The soundtrack contains an extended version of "The Main Event/Fight", containing a version which runs 11:39, an edited and slightly altered version at 4:54 (released as the single that hit number three on the U.S. pop charts and certified gold and number five in Canada), and a ballad version titled simply "The Main Event" as it omits the "Fight" parts. A bootleg of the recording sessions for the title song exists with Streisand commenting on the vocal challenges the song contains. A DJ-only promo 12" single was released for "The Main Event/Fight" as well as a 7" promo that featured a unique shorter 3:59 version backed with the single release.

Track listing

1. "The Main Event/Fight" – Barbra Streisand
2. "The Body Shop" – Michalski and Ooversteen
3. "The Main Event/Fight" (short version) – Barbra Streisand
4. "Copeland Meets the Coasters/Get a Job" – Michael Melvoin
5. "Big Girls Don't Cry" – Frankie Valli and The Four Seasons
6. "It's Your Foot Again" – Michael Melvoin
7. "Angry Eyes" – Loggins and Messina
8. "I'd Clean a Fish for You" – Michael Melvoin
9. "The Main Event" (ballad) – Barbra Streisand

=== Charts ===
Chart (1979)	Position
Australian Albums (Kent Music Report)	48
US Billboard 200	20

=== Certifications ===
Region	Certification	Certified units/sales
United States (RIAA)	Gold	500,000^{^}
^{^} Shipments figures based on certification alone.

== See also ==
- List of boxing films

Awards
Preceded by If Ever I See You Again and Renaldo and Clara	Stinker Award for Worst Picture (replaced Nightwing); 1979 Stinkers Bad Movie Awards	Succeeded by Popeye
