= Wet (album) =

Studio album by Barbra Streisand
- Released: October 1979
- Recorded: July 16 – August 28, 1979
- Studios: Capitol (Hollywood); Sound Labs (Hollywood); Crimson Sound (Los Angeles); Village Recorders (Los Angeles); Rusk Sound (Los Angeles)
- Genres: Pop; disco
- Length: 41:07
- Label: Columbia
- Producer: Gary Klein

Barbra Streisand chronology
The Main Event (1979)	Wet (1979)	Guilty (1980)

Wet is the twenty-first studio album by American singer-songwriter Barbra Streisand, released in 1979. It is a concept album of sorts with all the songs referring to, or expressing different interpretations of, water. Wet is also the first and the last word sung on the album.

The album was a major success for Streisand, propelled by the album's US No. 1 hit single, "No More Tears (Enough Is Enough)", a duet with American disco singer Donna Summer that underwent a retitling and change of emphasis in order to fit the water theme. Streisand also scored a top 10 US Adult Contemporary hit with the follow-up single "Kiss Me in the Rain."

There are two covers on the album: the 1940s standard "Come Rain or Come Shine" and the Bobby Darin classic "Splish Splash", which features background vocals by Toto lead singer Bobby Kimball.

== Cover art ==
The album cover was photographed by Mario Casilli and was shot at Streisand's home, the album cover shows Streisand naked with no clothes at hot tub and the pool in her house. And it was only album to have Streisand nude in the album cover.

== Critical reception ==
Professional ratings
Review scores
Source	Rating
AllMusic	3/5 stars

In his review for The New York Times, critic John Rockwell described Wet as a "predictable compendium of emotive ballads", noting that it was only partially redeemed by Barbra Streisand's "undeniable gifts as a vocalist". He praised her distinctive vibrato and emotional delivery but criticized the album's reliance on "syrupy strings and tired movie-music clichés". Rockwell observed that while most tracks adhered to the watery concept suggested by the title, livelier moments such as the duet with Donna Summer, "No More Tears (Enough Is Enough)", and a playful cover of "Splish Splash" added some needed variety. According to him, these inclusions demonstrated Streisand's awareness of contemporary pop trends and her attempt to balance her trademark sentimentality with modern musical energy.

Stephen Holden of Rolling Stone wrote that the concept of Wet—with every song centered around moisture—was clever but poorly executed, as Barbra Streisand "squanders it on mostly second-rate material". He noted that the only true standard on the album was "Come Rain or Come Shine", and while praising the lush arrangements by Lee Holdridge on Wet and "After the Rain", he described Streisand's performance on "Splish Splash" as "a hysterical fiasco". Holden further argued that Streisand's "trendiness" undermined her artistic judgment, calling the duet with Donna Summer, "No More Tears (Enough Is Enough)", "as low a piece of camp as she's ever recorded". Despite its commercial success, he concluded that the song's "cynical condescension to the mass market" tainted the reputations of all involved and added "a touch of slime to the overall sogginess".

== Commercial performance ==
The album peaked at No. 7 on the US, Canadian and Australian charts and has been certified as Platinum by the RIAA. According to the liner notes of Streisand's retrospective box set Just for the Record..., the album also received a record certification in New Zealand.

== Track listing ==
No.	Title	Writer(s)	Length
1.	"Wet"	Barbra Streisand; Sue Sheridan; David Wolfert	3:59
2.	"Come Rain or Come Shine"	Harold Arlen; Johnny Mercer	4:46
3.	"Splish Splash"	Bobby Darin; Murray Kaufman; Streisand	4:18
4.	"On Rainy Afternoons"	Alan Bergman; Marilyn Bergman; Lalo Schifrin	3:09
5.	"After the Rain"	A. Bergman; M. Bergman; Michel Legrand	3:42
6.	"No More Tears (Enough Is Enough)" (duet with Donna Summer)	Paul Jabara; Bruce Roberts	8:20
7.	"Niagara"	Carole Bayer Sager; Marvin Hamlisch; Roberts	3:33
8.	"I Ain't Gonna Cry Tonight"	Alan Gordon	5:04
9.	"Kiss Me in the Rain"	Sandy Farina; Lisa Ratner	4:20
Total length:			41:07

== Singles ==
- "No More Tears (Enough Is Enough)" [duet with Donna Summer] / "Wet" (1979)
- "No More Tears (Enough Is Enough)" [duet with Donna Summer] (12-inch extended mix) (1979)
- "Kiss Me in the Rain" / "I Ain't Gonna Cry Tonight" (1979)

== Personnel ==
- Barbra Streisand – vocals
- Dan Ferguson – acoustic guitar
- Larry Carlton, Jay Graydon, Steve Lukather – electric guitar
- David Hungate, Neil Stubenhaus – bass guitar
- Michael Boddicker, Ian Underwood – synthesizer
- James Gadson, Ed Greene, Jeff Porcaro, Steve Schaeffer, Rick Shlosser – drums
- David Foster, Michael Lang, Lincoln Mayorga, Bill Payne, Richard Tee – piano
- Alan Broadbent, Jai Winding – Fender Rhodes, piano
- Greg Mathieson – piano, Fender Rhodes, synthesizer
- Gary Coleman, Paulinho da Costa, Bobbye Hall – percussion
- Tom Scott – saxophone
- Gayle Levant – harp
- Bobby Kimball, Tom Kelly, Bill Champlin, Julia Waters, Maxine Waters, Luther Waters – backing vocals
- Lee Holdridge, Lalo Schifrin, Nick De Caro, Marvin Hamlisch, Charlie Calello, Greg Mathieson – arrangements, conducting
- Frank DeCaro - music contractor

== Charts ==
=== Weekly charts ===
Chart	Peak position
Japanese Albums (Oricon)	78
New Zealand Albums (RMNZ)	21
Norwegian Albums (VG-lista)	39
Swedish Albums (Sverigetopplistan)	22
UK Albums (Official Charts)	25
US Billboard 200	7
US Cashbox Top Albums	4

=== Year-end charts ===
Chart (1979)	Position
US Cash Box	53

Chart (1980)	Position
US Cash Box	74

== Certifications ==
Certifications for Wet
Region	Certification	Certified units/sales
Australia (ARIA)	Platinum	70,000^{^}
Canada (Music Canada)	Platinum	100,000^{^}
United Kingdom (BPI)	Gold	100,000^{^}
United States (RIAA)	Platinum	1,000,000^{^}
^{^} Shipments figures based on certification alone.
