= I'm Glad You're Here with Me Tonight =

Studio album by Neil Diamond
- Released: November 11, 1977
- Recorded: 1977
- Studios: Scorpio Sound (London); Indigo Ranch (Malibu, California); United Western (Hollywood); Sound Factory (Hollywood); Producer's Workshop (Hollywood); Cherokee (Hollywood)
- Genre: Pop
- Length: 39:20
- Label: Columbia
- Producer: Bob Gaudio

Neil Diamond chronology
Love at the Greek (1977)	I'm Glad You're Here with Me Tonight (1977)	You Don't Bring Me Flowers (1978)

Singles from I'm Glad You're Here with Me Tonight
- 1. "Desirée" Released: November 1977

Professional ratings
Review scores
Source	Rating
AllMusic	2/5 stars
The Rolling Stone Album Guide	1/5 stars

I'm Glad You're Here with Me Tonight is the eleventh studio album by Neil Diamond, released on Columbia Records in 1977. It includes a solo version of the song "You Don't Bring Me Flowers". Diamond would score a #1 hit with a new version recorded as a duet with Barbra Streisand the following year.

I'm Glad You're Here With Me Tonight was the second Neil Diamond album in a row to also garner a television special, which was broadcast on November 17, 1977, over the NBC television network. The television special received a Directors Guild of America award for Outstanding Directorial Achievement in Musical/Variety for Director Art Fisher, Associate Director David Grossman and Stage Manager Bob Graner. It was also nominated for three Emmy Awards. The special was a thematic and "behind the scenes" based program with interspersed live performances. It also features a pioneering segment with one of the earliest broadcasts of what would come to be known as a music video with its treatment of Diamond's song "Morningside".

== Track listing ==
All songs written by Neil Diamond, except where noted.

Side one
No.	Title	Writer(s)	Length
1.	"God Only Knows"	Brian Wilson, Tony Asher	4:01
2.	"Let Me Take You in My Arms Again"		2:56
3.	"Once in a While"		3:34
4.	"Let the Little Boy Sing"	Diamond, Bob Gaudio	3:24
5.	"I'm Glad You're Here with Me Tonight"	Gaudio, Judy Parker	4:18

Side two
No.	Title	Writer(s)	Length
1.	"Lament in D Minor"	Richard Bennett	1:10
2.	"Dance of the Sabres"		4:46
3.	"Desirée"		3:19
4.	"As If"		3:26
5.	"You Don't Bring Me Flowers"	Diamond, Alan Bergman, Marilyn Bergman	3:08
6.	"Free Man in Paris"	Joni Mitchell	4:46

== Personnel ==
Neil Diamond's Band

- Neil Diamond – main performer, writer, vocals, guitar
- Tom Hensley – orchestra arranger and conductor on "Dance of the Sabres", piano, keyboards
- Alan Lindgren – synthesizer, piano
- Linda Press – backing vocals
- Marilyn O'Brien – backing vocals
- Richard Bennett – acoustic and electric guitars
- Emory Gordy Jr. – guitar, keyboards
- Doug Rhone – guitar
- Reinie Press – bass guitar
- Dennis St. John – drums
- Vince Charles and King Errisson – percussion

Orchestra and guest musicians

- Alan Lindgren – orchestra arranger and conductor on all tracks except "Dance of the Sabres"
- The Sid Sharp Strings – strings
- Murray Adler, Arnold Belnick, Al Bruening, Sal Crimi, Isabelle Daskoff, Henry Ferber, Elliott Fisher, Ronald Folsom, Jimmy Getzoff, Meg Grabb, Lou Klass, Bernie Kundell, Bill Kurasch, Marvin Lamonick, Joy Lyle, Gordon Marin, Stan Plummer, Jay Rosen, Nate Ross, Sheldon Sanov, Marcia Van Dyke, and Tibor Zelig – violin
- Sam Boghossian, Richard Dickler, Pam Goldsmith, Alan Harshman, Myra Kestenbaum, Linda Lipsett, Mike Nowak, Dave Schwartz, Linn Subotnick, Herschel Weiss – viola
- Jesse Erlich, Armin Kaproff, Ray Kelly, Jerry Kessler, Harry Schultz, Gloria Strasner – cello
- Peter Mercurio, Buell Neidlinger, Bob Stone – double bass
- Gayle Levant – harp
- Bobby and Chuck Findley, Jack Laubach, Bobby Shew, Tony Terran – trumpet
- Charlie Loper, Bob Payne – trombone
- Ernie Tack – bass trombone
- Tommy Johnson – tuba
- Tom Scott – horn soloist
- Alan and Marnie Robinson – French horn
- Harold Diner, James A. Dseker, Bob Hardaway, Terry Harrington, Dick Hyde, Robert Jung, Barbara Korn, Steven P. Madaio, Arthur N. Maebe, Lew McCreary, Oliver E. Mitchell, Brian Dennis O'Conner, William R. Perkins, Johnny Rotella, George B. Thatcher – reeds
- Tommy Morgan – harmonica

Production

- Bob Gaudio – producer
- David Kirschner – art direction, design
- Bill Schnee – audio engineering on basic tracks, vocals, strings, horns
- Chris Brunt – audio engineering on vocals and miscellaneous
- Mike Reese and Doug Sax – mastering
- Val Garay – remixing
- Jerry Barnes – horns tracking
- Mallory Earl and Dennis Kirk – overdubs and miscellaneous tracking
- Marge Johnson – production coordinator
- Beatrice Marks – producer's assistant
- Dennis Hansen and Neil Kernan – audio engineering assistants
- Tom Bert – photography
- Bob Maile – calligraphy

== Charts ==
=== Weekly charts ===
Chart (1977–78)	Peak position
Australian Albums (Kent Music Report)	5
Austrian Albums (Ö3 Austria)	8
Canada Top Albums/CDs (RPM)	6
Dutch Albums (Album Top 100)	4
German Albums (Offizielle Top 100)	13
New Zealand Albums (RMNZ)	1
UK Albums (Official Charts)	16
US Billboard 200	6

=== Year-end charts ===
Chart (1978)	Position
Austrian Albums (Ö3 Austria)	20
Canada Top Albums/CDs (RPM)	51
Dutch Albums (Album Top 100)	89
New Zealand Albums (RMNZ)	22

== Certifications ==
Region	Certification	Certified units/sales
Canada (Music Canada)	Platinum	100,000^{^}
United Kingdom (BPI)	Gold	100,000^{^}
United States (RIAA)	2× Platinum	2,000,000^{^}
^{^} Shipments figures based on certification alone.
