= Desirée (song) =

Single by Neil Diamond

from the album I'm Glad You're Here with Me Tonight
- B-side: "Once in a While"
- Released: November 1977
- Genre: Pop, Rock
- Length: 3:19
- Label: Columbia
- Songwriter: Neil Diamond
- Producer: Bob Gaudio

Neil Diamond singles chronology
"Lady-Oh" (1977)	"Desirée" (1977)	"God Only Knows" (1978)

"Desirée" is a 1977 song written and recorded by Neil Diamond and included as a track on Diamond's 1977 album, I'm Glad You're Here with Me Tonight. The single peaked at number 16 on the Billboard Hot 100 and reached number one on the U.S. Easy Listening chart to become his fifth number one on that chart. The song likewise reached number one on the Canadian AC chart.

Cash Box said that it has an "infectious intro on the grand piano" and that Diamond is "at the top of his form." Record World said that the song "rocks lightly, and is arranged to focus attention on the provocative lyrics."

It was used as the first long-distance dedication on American Top 40 on the show aired August 26, 1978.

== Chart history ==
=== Weekly charts ===
Chart (1977–78)	Peak position
Australia KMR	29
Austria (Ö3 Austria Top 40)	15
Belgium (Ultratop 50 Flanders)	24
Canada Top Singles (RPM)	8
Canada RPM Adult Contemporary	1
Germany (GfK)	25
Ireland (IRMA)	6
Netherlands (Single Top 100)	21
New Zealand	5
South Africa (Springbok Radio)	4
UK Singles (Official Charts)	39
US Billboard Hot 100	16
US Adult Contemporary (Billboard)	1
US Cash Box Top 100	9

=== Year-end charts ===
Chart (1978)	Rank
Australia	128
Canada	77
US (Joel Whitburn's Pop Annual)	114
US Cash Box	75

== See also ==
- List of number-one adult contemporary singles of 1978 (U.S.)
