= Eyes of Laura Mars =

1978 film by Irvin Kershner

- Theatrical release poster
- Directed by: Irvin Kershner
- Screenplay by: John Carpenter; David Zelag Goodman
- Story by: John Carpenter
- Produced by: Jon Peters
- Starring: Faye Dunaway; Tommy Lee Jones; Brad Dourif; René Auberjonois; Raul Julia
- Cinematography: Victor J. Kemper
- Edited by: Michael Kahn
- Music by: Artie Kane
- Production company: Columbia Pictures
- Distributed by: Columbia Pictures
- Release date: August 2, 1978
- Running time: 104 minutes
- Country: United States
- Language: English
- Budget: $7 million
- Box office: $20 million

Eyes of Laura Mars is a 1978 American supernatural horror thriller film directed by Irvin Kershner and starring Faye Dunaway, Tommy Lee Jones, Brad Dourif, René Auberjonois, and Raul Julia. It follows a New York City fashion photographer (Dunaway) who suddenly develops the clairvoyant ability to witness disturbing serial murders from the point of view of the killer. The screenplay was adapted (in collaboration with David Zelag Goodman) from a spec script titled Eyes, written by John Carpenter; it was Carpenter's first major studio film. H. B. Gilmour later wrote a novelization.

Producer Jon Peters, who was dating Barbra Streisand at the time, bought the screenplay as a starring vehicle for her, but Streisand eventually decided not to take the role because of "the kinky nature of the story", as Peters later explained. As a result, the role went to Dunaway, who had just won an Oscar for her performance in Network (1976). Streisand nevertheless felt that "Prisoner", the torch song from the film, would be a good power ballad vehicle for her. She recorded the song for the soundtrack and it peaked at number 21 on the Billboard Hot 100. Peters commissioned photographer Helmut Newton to provide the images that stand in for Laura Mars' portfolio in the film.

Released on August 2, 1978, by Columbia Pictures, the film was a box-office success, grossing $20 million domestically. Some critics and film scholars have noted Eyes of Laura Mars as an American version of the Italian giallo with elements of the slasher film, and it has gone on to develop a cult following.

== Plot ==
Laura Mars is a glamorous New York City fashion photographer who specializes in photographs featuring stylized violence, which attract controversy from the press and feminists who feel her work is exploitative. The night before the release of her photography book The Eyes of Mars, Laura has a dream about an assailant entering a woman's apartment, which she observes from the first-person perspective of the intruder. The following night at the book release party, Laura is notified that her photo editor, Doris, has been found murdered, her eyes gouged with an ice pick. Also during the party, Laura encounters detective John Neville, who criticises her work for its content, not realising she is the artist.

Shortly thereafter, during a photoshoot in Columbus Circle, Laura has another disturbing vision of a woman being stabbed to death outside her apartment, and stumbles upon the crime scene while passing by on the street. Laura informs police she witnessed the crime, but is unable to rationalize how. She later learns that the victim, Elaine, has been romantically involved with her ex-husband Michael, a writer who had been living in San Francisco but returned to New York.

Neville, who is now in charge of the case, shows Laura unpublished police photographs of unsolved murders that very closely mirror Laura's fashion shoots. Laura's visions continue, including visions of the killer stalking her and continuing to murder those around her. While developing photographs in her darkroom, Laura has another vision of her models Lulu and Michelle being brutally murdered. After attending Lulu and Michelle's funerals, Laura finds herself growing close to Neville, and the two begin a romance. He gives her a gun for her own protection.

Meanwhile, police consider Laura's driver Tommy, an ex-convict, and Michael to be their prime suspects in the string of serial killings. While attending a birthday party for her agent Donald, Laura receives a phone call from a drunken Michael, who is threatening suicide. Donald urges her against helping him, but Laura leaves the party. While driving to meet Michael, Laura has a vision of Donald being murdered by the killer, which causes her to crash her car. Later, Neville is informed that photographs of the murdered models have been found in Tommy's apartment. Tommy agrees to talk to Neville and clear his name, but Neville reveals that one of his playing cards was found under Donald's body. Tommy flees and attacks other police officers as Neville pursues him on foot. Tommy is then shot by another cop during the chase and is killed.

At her apartment, Laura is contacted by Neville who tells her it's all over, advising her to pack a bag so they can go away together. Laura is then affected by a vision of the killer murdering Michael. The killer attempts to break in through her front door, but Laura deadbolts it before the killer can enter. Upon hearing her distress, Neville (who had been on his way to meet her) breaks through her balcony window. He proceeds to tell Laura that Tommy was the killer and begins an elaborate explanation of his motivations and backstory. Knowing Tommy well, Laura recognizes this as a lie and realizes that Neville is the true killer. Neville details more of his own story, slipping between multiple personalities. When the violent personality tries to kill Laura, his more sensitive personality reasserts dominance. He takes her hand, which holds the gun he gave her, and asks her to kill him. Distraught, she does so before calling the police.

== Cast ==
- Faye Dunaway as Laura Mars
- Tommy Lee Jones as Lieutenant John Neville
- Brad Dourif as Tommy Ludlow
- René Auberjonois as Donald Phelps
- Raúl Juliá as Michael Reisler
- Frank Adonis as Detective Sal Volpe
- Lisa Taylor as Michelle
- Darlanne Fluegel as Lulu
- Rose Gregorio as Elaine Cassel
- Bill Boggs as himself
- Steve Marachuk as Robert
- Meg Mundy as Doris Spenser
- Marilyn Meyers as Sheila Weissman
- John Sahag as a hairdresser

== Production ==
=== Development ===
The film's source story was written by John Carpenter, as was the earliest version of the screenplay. Producer Jack H. Harris had worked with Carpenter on the latter's feature-film directorial debut, Dark Star, and it was Harris who optioned Carpenter's 11-page treatment, then titled simply Eyes.

Harris planned to make the film independently of the major studios with privately raised finance and Roberta Collins in the lead. But Harris's friend Jon Peters read the treatment, and upon reading it, he became enthusiastic about its potential as a vehicle for Peters's then-girlfriend Barbra Streisand. Peters got interest from Peter Guber at Columbia and they agreed to finance the project's development. Streisand pulled out of the film, but Columbia were sufficiently enthusiastic about the script to move forward with another actress, and Faye Dunaway was cast. However, as a condition of this, the studio insisted on the script being rewritten, hiring David Zelag Goodman to undertake the rewrites. "It wasn't a pleasant experience", said Carpenter. "The original script was very good, I thought. But it got shat upon."

=== Filming ===
Filming took place over 56 days from October 17, 1977, to early January 1978. The film was shot entirely in New York and New Jersey, with filming locations including New York City; Jersey City, New Jersey; and Ferncliff Cemetery in Hartsdale, New York. A sequence where the Laura Mars character photographs a group of models against a backdrop of two burning cars was filmed over four days at New York's Columbus Circle. It was reported that Peters and Dunaway had a tense relationship while making the film.

== Soundtrack ==
Eyes of Laura Mars (Music from the Original Motion Picture Soundtrack) was released by Columbia Records (PS 35487) in 1978 ahead of the film's release. It was produced by Gary Klein with executive producers Jon Peters and Charles Koppelman.

Mark Iskowitz of The Barbra Streisand Music Guide wrote: "The side one 'Prisoner' track is actually identical to the single and Greatest Hits Volume 2 version. The side two reprise version does contain instrumentation from the film score at the beginning and during the first sections of the song, which is featured in its entirety. Track 3 opens with Barbra singing the first four lines from 'Prisoner' with a sparse, spooky film score backing."

The Eyes of Laura Mars LP is out of print; it was never released on CD.

=== Track listing ===
Side one
No.	Title	Writer(s)	Artist	Length
1.	"Prisoner (Love Theme from Eyes of Laura Mars)"	Karen Lawrence; John DeSautels	Barbra Streisand	3:53
2.	"Laura's Nightmare"	Artie Kane	Artie Kane	2:06
3.	"Burn"	George Michalski; Nikki Oosterveen	Michalski & Oosterveen	4:16
4.	"Elaine"	Kane	Artie Kane	1:25
5.	"Laura & Neville (Instrumental)"	Kane	Artie Kane	2:33
6.	"Medley: Native New Yorker (Shake, Shake, Shake) Shake Your Booty; Prisoner (Disco Instrumental)"	Various: Sandy Linzer; Denny Randell Harry Wayne Casey; Richard Finch Artie Kane	Various: Odyssey; KC and the Sunshine Band; Artie Kane	4:33

Side two
No.	Title	Writer(s)	Artist	Length
1.	"Laura – Warehouse"	Kane	Artie Kane	1:11
2.	"Let's All Chant"	Michael Zager; Alvin Fields	Michael Zager Band	4:05
3.	"Laura & Neville (Dialogue & Vocal)"	Kane	Artie Kane	2:33
4.	"Lulu & Michelle"	Kane	Artie Kane	3:06
5.	"Love & Pity"	Kane	Artie Kane	4:10
6.	"Love Theme from Eyes of Laura Mars (Prisoner) – Reprise"	Lawrence; DeSautels	Barbra Streisand	3:56

== Reception ==
=== Box office ===
Eyes of Laura Mars premiered in Los Angeles on August 2, 1978. The film was a box-office success, grossing $20 million in the United States.

=== Critical response ===
On its release, the film received mixed critical reviews. The film received a broadly positive review in The New York Times, in which Janet Maslin called the ending of the film "dumb", but otherwise liked it. She wrote of it: "It's the cleverness of Eyes of Laura Mars that counts, cleverness that manifests itself in superlative casting, drily controlled direction from Irvin Kershner, and spectacular settings that turn New York into the kind of eerie, lavish dreamland that could exist only in the idle noodlings of the very, very hip."

Roger Ebert was less enthusiastic, giving the film one-and-a-half stars out of four and criticizing what he called the film's clichéd "woman in trouble" plot. Gene Siskel gave it a single star out of 4 and described the movie as "hateful."

In his book Historical Dictionary of Horror Films (2017), writer Peter Hutchings describes Eyes of Laura Mars as an "upmarket slasher film."

Critic for The New Yorker Pauline Kael had insight into what she thought reviews were so critical stating "the reviewers seem to be complaining that it's a thriller, or rather an effective thriller. Them being frightened seems to make them resent the film as immoral."

On the review aggregator website Rotten Tomatoes, the film holds an approval rating of 62% based on 39 reviews, with an average rating of 5.6/10. The website's critics consensus reads, "Eyes of Laura Mars hints at interesting possibilities, but they're frittered away by a predictable story that settles for superficial thrills." Metacritic, which uses a weighted average, assigned the film a score of 49 out of 100, based on 11 critics, indicating "mixed or average" reviews.

George Lucas hired director Kershner for The Empire Strikes Back (1980) because he was impressed after seeing a rough cut of the film.

A parody of the film titled Eyes of Lurid Mess was published in Mad magazine. It was illustrated by Angelo Torres and written by Larry Siegel in regular issue #206, April 1979.

== Home media ==
Columbia TriStar Home Entertainment first released the film on DVD in 2000. Mill Creek Entertainment released a Blu-ray edition in 2019, while Kino Lorber issued a special edition Blu-ray in October 2022.

== Legacy ==
In the years since its release, film scholars have likened Eyes of Laura Mars to the American equivalent of the Italian giallo film. It has also developed a small cult following and had retrospective revival screenings, including at the Seattle International Film Festival in 2023.

Along with 1977 Italian giallo film Sette note in nero (English Title: The Psychic or Seven Notes in Black), it was unofficially adapted into the 1984 Tamil film Nooravathu Naal, which itself was remade into the 1991 Hindi-language film 100 Days.
