= Songbird (Barbra Streisand album) =

Studio album by Barbra Streisand
- Released: May 1978
- Studios: Sound Labs, Inc. (Los Angeles); Mediasound (New York City)
- Genre: Pop
- Length: 37:32
- Label: Columbia
- Producer: Gary Klein

Barbra Streisand chronology
Superman (1977)	Songbird (1978)	Barbra Streisand's Greatest Hits Volume 2 (1978)

Singles from Songbird
- 1. "Songbird / Honey Can I Put On Your Clothes?" Released: 1978

Songbird is the twentieth studio album by American singer Barbra Streisand, released in 1978. The title track reached number 25 on the Hot 100 and spent two weeks atop the adult contemporary chart. The album also includes Streisand's solo version of "You Don't Bring Me Flowers". She also subsequently re-recorded the song as a duet with Neil Diamond and this version topped the Billboard Hot 100 chart for two non-consecutive weeks in December 1978.

In the United States the album has been certified Platinum for sales of 1,000,000 copies. Streisand received the award at a convention held by CBS in Los Angeles.

== Critical reception ==
Professional ratings
Review scores
Source	Rating
AllMusic	3/5 stars
Orange Coast	unfavorable
Rolling Stone	unfavorable

The Los Angeles Times deemed the album "down-the-pike Streisand, safely negotiating the lanes to the right of the middle of the road."

== Track listing ==
1. "Tomorrow" (Charles Strouse, Martin Charnin) – 2:56
2. "A Man I Loved" (Nikki Oosterveen, George Michalski) – 4:02
3. "I Don't Break Easily" (Bruce Roberts) – 3:53
4. "Love Breakdown" (Alan Gordon) – 3:36
5. "You Don't Bring Me Flowers" (Neil Diamond, Alan Bergman, Marilyn Bergman) – 3:58
6. "Honey Can I Put on Your Clothes" (Jean Monte Ray, Jerry Leiber, Mike Stoller) – 5:24
7. "One More Night" (Stephen Bishop) – 3:10
8. "Stay Away" (Kim Carnes) – 3:47
9. "Deep in the Night" (Helen Miller, Eve Merriam) – 3:10
10. "Songbird" (Dave Wolfert, Stephen Nelson) – 3:46

== Personnel ==
- Barbra Streisand – vocals, back cover photography
- Charlie Brown, Dennis Budimir, Larry Carlton, Sal DiTroia, Mitch Holder, Jay Graydon, Steve Lukather, Lee Ritenour, John Tropea – guitar
- David Hungate, Abraham Laboriel, Will Lee, Reinie Press – bass guitar
- David Foster, Lincoln Mayorga, Greg Mathieson, Larry Muhoberac – piano
- Leon Pendarvis, Pat Rebillot – keyboards
- James Newton Howard, Ian Underwood – synthesizer
- Allan Schwartzberg – drums, percussion
- Ed Greene, Jeff Porcaro – drums
- Paulinho da Costa, Bob Zimmitti – percussion
- Gayle Levant – harp
- Ronny Lang – alto saxophone, soprano saxophone
- Jim Horn – alto saxophone, flute, tenor saxophone
- Ernie Watts – alto saxophone, flute, tenor saxophone
- Larry Williams – saxophone
- Jerry Hey, Steve Madaio – trumpet
- Bill Reichenbach Jr. – trombone
- Louise Di Tullio – flute
- George Michalski, Niki Oosterveen, Jim Gilstrap, Julia Tillman Waters, Maxine Willard Waters, Oren Waters, Stephanie Spruill – backing vocals

Technical

- Charles Koppelman – executive producer
- Armin Steiner – engineer, remixing
- Nick DeCaro, James Newton Howard, Lee Holdridge, Gene Page – orchestral arrangements
- Steve Schapiro – front cover photography

== Charts ==
Chart (1978)	Peak position
Australian Albums (ARIA)	30
Canada Top Albums/CDs (RPM)	10
UK Albums (Official Charts)	48
US Billboard 200	12
US Cashbox Top Albums	11

== Certifications ==
Region	Certification	Certified units/sales
Australia (ARIA)	Gold	35,000^{^}
Canada (Music Canada)	Platinum	100,000^{^}
United Kingdom (BPI)	Silver	60,000^{^}
United States (RIAA)	Platinum	1,000,000^{^}
^{^} Shipments figures based on certification alone.
