= Superman (Barbra Streisand album) =

- Cover of CD booklet

Studio album by Barbra Streisand
- Released: June 1977
- Recorded: March – April 1977
- Studios: Sound Labs, Inc. (Los Angeles, CA); Capitol Studios (Hollywood, CA); United Western Recorders (Las Vegas, NV)
- Genre: Pop
- Length: 36:41
- Label: Columbia
- Producers: Gary Klein, Charles Calello (track 6)

Barbra Streisand chronology
A Star Is Born (1976)	Superman (1977)	Songbird (1978)

Singles from Superman
- 1. "My Heart Belongs to Me" Released: May 1977

Superman (1977) is the nineteenth studio album by American singer Barbra Streisand. The lead single "My Heart Belongs to Me" became a hit in 1977, peaking at #4 on the US pop chart. The title track was released as a follow-up but did not chart as highly as its predecessor. The album peaked at number 3 on the Top 200 LP Billboard album chart and on the UK Albums Chart at number 32. It has sold 2 million copies in United States and was certified 2× Platinum. Streisand co-wrote two songs on the album - "Don't Believe What You Read" and "Answer Me". The latter is also featured on her 2023 compilation album Evergreens: Celebrating Six Decades.

== Background and production ==
The album was released after the success of Streisand's movie A Star Is Born, from 1976. At that time the movie soundtrack was the singer's best-selling album with 4.1 million copies sold worldwide and a platinum certification in the United States, for more than 1 million copies sold. According to The New York Times, the album brings sounds from what they called "the second transition in Streisand's career", which began with the Stoney End album, in 1970, in which the singer experimented contemporary pop rock sounds and left aside "old‐fashioned" and "theatrical diva" from her early LPs, and that in Superman she confirms as a "a credible interpreter of contemporary songs".

Two songs were written for the movie A Star Is Born but not used in the picture — "Answer Me" by Streisand, Paul Williams and Kenny Ascher; and "Lullaby for Myself" by Rupert Holmes. It also includes cover versions of contemporary singer-songwriters Kim Carnes' "Love Comes from Unexpected Places" from her album Sailin' and Billy Joel's "New York State of Mind" from Turnstiles. According to Joel, Streisand's recording resulted in his mother looking at his career with newfound respect: "Certainly my mom looked at me with fresh eyes–finally, a real singer had picked up on her errant son's efforts."

== Critical reception ==
Professional ratings
Review scores
Source	Rating
AllMusic	3/5 stars
The Rolling Stone Album Guide	4/5 stars

The album received good reviews from music critics. William Ruhlmann from AllMusic wrote that even though the album "seemed to be an unusually personal album for the singer, reflecting her feelings and viewpoints" it is not one of her best. Dave Marsh of Rolling Stone wrote that the album was Streisand's best effort since her Stoney End (1970) album, and that it's an "ample evidence that Streisand actually can get away with singing whatever she chooses". He also wrote that even though there are some mannerisms, like her phrasing, "the material is chosen skillfully enough to transcend that". In his review for The New York Times, Stephen Holden wrote that Streisand Superman "ranks among the finest of Barbra Streisand's 30plus LP's", and that her "voice is in amazing shape today—stronger, more controlled and more confident than ever".

A contemporary review in Cash Box magazine described the album as a powerful release capable of leaping up the music charts. The review highlighted the contrast in the album's material, noting how a "thick foliage of richly arranged numbers" gives way to the "expansive purity" of Streisand's voice, with soft songs of yearning building into energetic crescendos. The publication also pointed out the inclusion of a couple of songs written for "A Star Is Born" and recommended the album for AOR, MOR, and pop playlists.

== Commercial performance ==
The album repeated the success of the singer's previous album, the movie soundtrack A Star Is Born, and as of November 1977, it had sold 1.6 million copies in the United States, three times more than the two previous studio albums: Butterfly (1974) and Lazy Afternoon (1975). The album peaked at number 3 on the Billboard 200 album chart and on the UK Albums Chart at number 32. On November 14, 1994, it was certified double platinum by the Recording Industry Association of America (RIAA), for 2 million copies sold in the United States.

== Track listing ==
Superman
No.	Title	Writer(s)	Length
1.	"Superman"	Richie Snyder	2:47
2.	"Don't Believe What You Read"	Barbra Streisand, Ron Nagle, Scott Mathews	3:37
3.	"Baby Me Baby"	Roger Miller	4:26
4.	"I Found You Love"	Alan Gordon	3:50
5.	"Answer Me"	Streisand, Paul Williams, Kenny Ascher	3:16
6.	"My Heart Belongs to Me"	Alan Gordon	3:21
7.	"Cabin Fever"	Ron Nagle	3:14
8.	"Love Comes from Unexpected Places"	Kim Carnes, Dave Ellingson	4:10
9.	"New York State of Mind"	Billy Joel	4:44
10.	"Lullaby for Myself"	Rupert Holmes	3:17

== Personnel ==
- Barbra Streisand – vocals
- Gary Klein, Charles Calello (track 6) – producers
- Steve Schapiro – photography
- Alan Broadbent, David Foster, David Paich, David Wolfert, Dennis Budimir, Ed Greene, Eddie Karam, Emil Richards, Fred Tackett, Gary Coleman, Gayle LeVant, Harry Bluestone, Harvey Mason, Israel Baker, Jay Graydon, Jeff Porcaro, John Bahler, John McClure, Larry Carlton, Lee Ritenour, Lincoln Mayorga, Michael Boddicker, Mike Melvoin, Plas Johnson, Ralph Grierson, Reine Press, Robben Ford, Scott Mathews, Steve Paietta, Tommy Tedesco, Virginia Berger – musicians
- Augie Johnson, Clydie King, Jim Gilstrap, John Lehman, Julia Tillman Waters, Venetta Fields – background vocals

== Charts ==
=== Weekly charts ===
Chart (1977)	Peak position
Australian Albums (ARIA)	11
Canada Top Albums/CDs (RPM)	1
Japanese Albums (Oricon)	44
New Zealand Albums (RMNZ)	33
Swedish Albums (Sverigetopplistan)	46
UK Albums (Official Charts)	32
US Billboard 200	3
US Cashbox Top Albums	2

=== Year-end charts ===
Chart (1977)	Position
US Cash Box	32

== Certifications ==
Region	Certification	Certified units/sales
Australia (ARIA)	Gold	35,000^{^}
Canada (Music Canada)	Platinum	100,000^{^}
Japan	—	15,000
United States (RIAA)	2× Platinum	2,000,000^{^}
^{^} Shipments figures based on certification alone.
