= Gary Klein (producer) =

American songwriter and record producer (born 1942)

Gary Klein (born September 28, 1942, in Brooklyn, New York) is an American songwriter and Grammy Award-nominated record producer. He graduated from Long Island University with a Bachelor of Arts in music.

In the era which included classic rock, country, punk, disco, and pop, record producer Gary Klein was well known for working across genres and often crossing over genres. He worked with country musicians Glen Campbell and Dolly Parton on "Southern Nights" and "Here You Come Again", which some consider the beginning of country music being accepted by mainstream pop audiences.

== Career ==
In 1962, Gary Klein co-wrote the international pop hit song "Bobby's Girl". He continued songwriting for a short time including "Guess Who?" (Kornfeld/Klein), which was included on Dusty Springfield's Dusty album.

In 1968, Klein produced Tim Hardin's Live in Concert 3. Hardin changed labels and, in 1969, his first studio release for Columbia Records, Suite for Susie Moore and Damion: We are One, One, We Are, was produced by Klein. It reached number 129 on the Billboard 200.

In his review for AllMusic, music critic Bruce Eder wrote of the reissue that included "Bird on the Wire": "There's a lot of pain in this disc, to be sure — it's hard to find a Hardin song that didn't have some — but also a level of lyrical and musical excellence that one should feel privileged to partake of."

In 1974, Mac Davis, while working on a new album wrote the song "Stop and Smell the Roses", Klein produced version of the track won out and it went to number one on the Billboard Adult Contemporary Chart, and was a Top 10 hit on the Billboard Hot 100.

In 1975, Klein recorded Johnny Cash's album John R. Cash.

In 1976–1977, Klein began working with Glen Campbell. This resulted in the pop and country charts' number one success with "Southern Nights". Upon Campbell's crossover to the pop chart, Dolly Parton and RCA Records wondered if he could do the same for her. In 1977, Klein produced Parton's album, Here You Come Again. It was the first of three albums he produced for Parton. In Klein's production of "Here You Come Again", with a piano intro by musician David Foster, Klein devised a sound with an ingenious idea: placing masking tape across the keys inside the piano.

Klein began working with Barbra Streisand in 1977 on her album Superman. "My Heart Belongs to Me" hit number one on the Adult Contemporary Chart and the album went to number four on the Billboard 200, resulting in double platinum album. In 1978, Streisand's Songbird album was released. It was another double platinum album. At this point, Streisand was doing an album a year with Klein. In 1979–80, Klein produced Streisand's Wet album. This included the number one single, "No More Tears (Enough Is Enough)", a smash-hit duet with Donna Summer. He then produced Janis Ian's 1981 album, Restless Eyes, her last to dent the Billboard Top 200, and her last album to be released in the US until 1993.

Klein stopped producing records in 1987. He joined EMI Records/EMI Music Publishing's CEO/Chairman Charles Koppelman in 1989, becoming an executive at the company. While there, he transitioned to the publishing division full-time working with CEO/Chairman Martin Bandier. Koppelman, Bandier and Klein originally worked together at The Entertainment Company in 1975–1982. The company was financed by real estate tycoon, Samuel J. LeFrak. They were led by CEO Charles Koppelman who oversaw all aspects of the company, with Martin Bandier as General Counsel and Klein leading the creative side of the business as record producer. Klein remained with Koppelman and Bandier at EMI and went on to have a 20-year run as an executive at the company.
