= Neil Diamond discography =

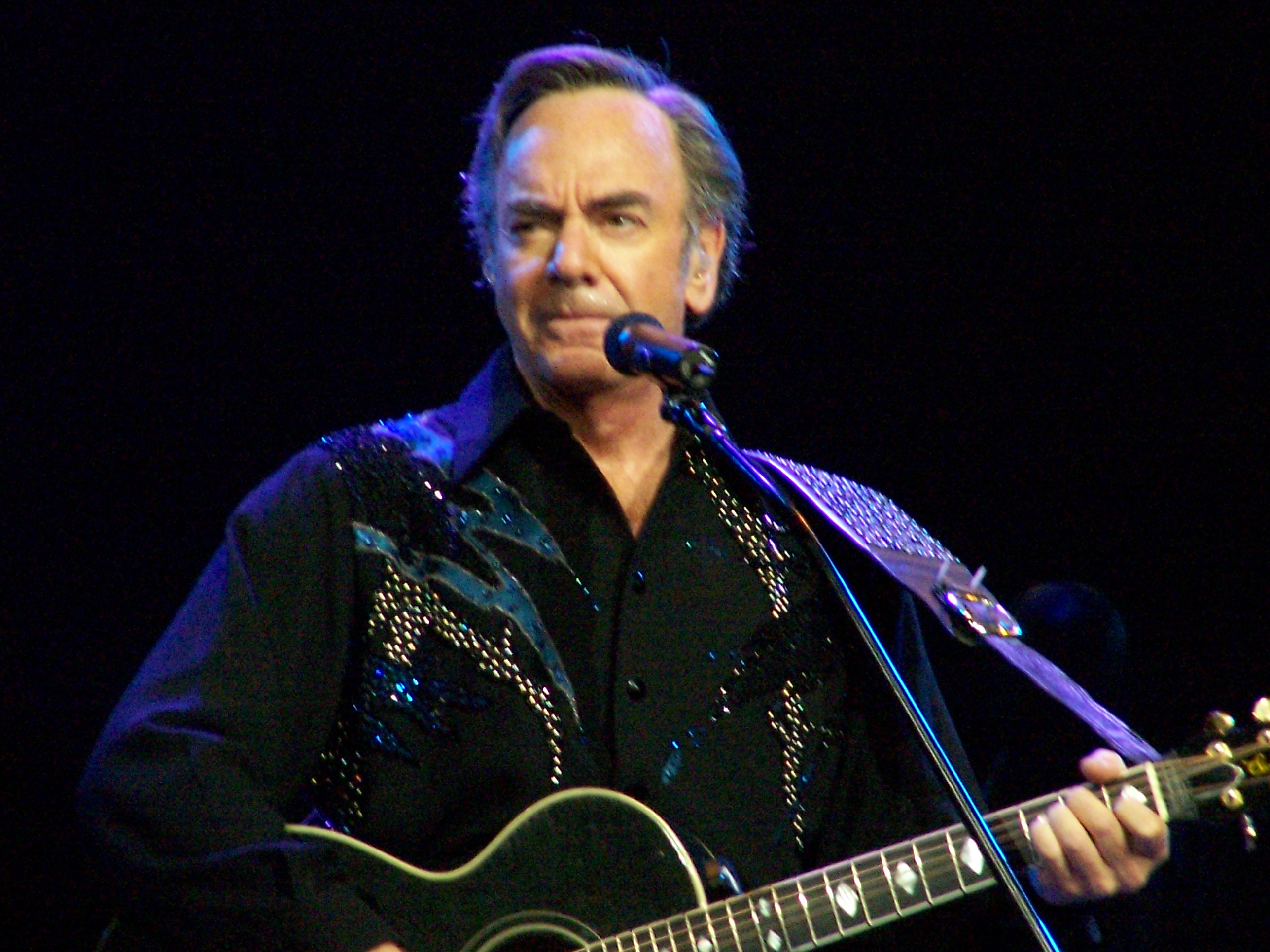
- Diamond performing in 2005
- Studio albums: 33
- Soundtrack albums: 2
- Live albums: 8
- Compilation albums: 35
- Singles: 96

This is the discography of American singer-songwriter Neil Diamond. He has sold more than 130 million records worldwide, making him one of the best-selling music artists in history. Billboard ranked him as the 25th greatest artist of all time. According to the Recording Industry Association of America (RIAA), Diamond has sold 51.5 million albums in the United States.

Diamond is the only artist to score a top 20 hit in each decade since the creation of Billboard's Adult Contemporary chart. In a career spanning five decades, he has scored 38 top-40 singles and 16 top-10 albums on Billboard charts.

== Studio albums ==
=== 1960s ===
Title	Album details	Peak chart positions			Certifications
Title	Album details	US	AUS	CAN	Certifications
The Feel of Neil Diamond	Released: August 12, 1966; Label: Bang (#B214); Formats: LP	137	—N/a	—	
Just for You	Released: August 25, 1967; Label: Bang (#B217); Formats: LP	80	—N/a	—	
Velvet Gloves and Spit	Released: October 15, 1968; Label: Uni (#73030); Formats: LP, 8-track, CS	—	—N/a	—	
Brother Love's Travelling Salvation Show	Released: April 4, 1969; Label: Uni (#73047); Formats: LP, 8-track, CS	82	—N/a	—	US: Gold
Touching You, Touching Me	Released: November 14, 1969; Label: Uni (#73071); Formats: LP, 8-track, CS	30	9	21	US: Gold
"—" denotes items that did not chart or were not released in that territory. "N/A" indicates chart not yet published.

=== 1970s ===
Title	Album details	Peak chart positions									Certifications
Title	Album details	US	AUS	AUT	CAN	GER	NED	NZ	NOR	UK	Certifications
Tap Root Manuscript	Released: November 6, 1970; Label: Uni (#73092); Formats: LP, 8-track, CS	13	31	—	13	—	—	—N/a	—	18	US: Platinum
Stones	Released: November 5, 1971; Label: Uni (#93106); Formats: LP, 8-track, CS	11	13	—	10	28	—	—N/a	—	17	US: Gold
Moods	Released: July 15, 1972; Label: Uni (#93136); Formats: LP, 8-track, CS	5	4	—	4	9	3	—N/a	5	7	US: Platinum
Serenade	Released: September 27, 1974; Label: Columbia (#32919); Formats: LP, 8-track, CS	3	1	7	2	1	3	3	—	11	US: Platinum; AUS: Gold; CAN: Platinum; GER: Gold; UK: Gold
Beautiful Noise	Released: June 11, 1976; Label: Columbia (#33965); Formats: LP, 8-track, CS	4	1	1	5	1	1	1	—	10	US: Platinum; AUS: Gold; CAN: Platinum; GER: Gold; NED: Gold; NZ: 5× Gold; RSA: Gold; UK: Gold
I'm Glad You're Here with Me Tonight	Released: November 11, 1977; Label: Columbia (#34990); Formats: LP, 8-track, CS	6	5	8	6	13	4	1	—	16	US: 2× Platinum; CAN: Platinum; UK: Gold
You Don't Bring Me Flowers	Released: November 3, 1978; Label: Columbia (#35625); Formats: LP, 8-track, CS	4	5	—	4	38	7	2	—	15	US: 2× Platinum; CAN: 2× Platinum; NZ: Platinum; UK: Gold
September Morn	Released: December 22, 1979; Label: Columbia (#36121); Formats: LP, 8-track, CS	10	3	13	13	28	17	3	—	14	US: Platinum; AUS: Platinum; NZ: Platinum; UK: Gold
"—" denotes items that did not chart or were not released in that territory. "N/A" indicates chart not yet published.

=== 1980s ===
Title	Album details	Peak chart positions									Certifications
Title	Album details	US	AUS	CAN	EUR	GER	NED	NZ	NOR	UK	Certifications
On the Way to the Sky	Released: October 9, 1981; Label: Columbia (#37628); Formats: LP, 8-track, CS	17	12	36	—N/a	56	14	11	—	39	US: Platinum; NZ: Gold; UK: Silver
Heartlight	Released: August 27, 1982; Label: Columbia (#38359); Formats: LP, 8-track, CS	9	8	13	—N/a	—	25	37	39	43	US: Platinum; AUS: Platinum; UK: Silver
Primitive	Released: April 1, 1984; Label: Columbia (#39199); Formats: LP, CS, CD	35	45	55	19	21	5	—	—	7	US: Gold; UK: Silver
Headed for the Future	Released: March 11, 1986; Label: Columbia (#40368); Formats: LP, CS, CD	20	72	51	40	65	33	—	—	36	US: Gold
The Best Years of Our Lives	Released: December 13, 1988; Label: Columbia (#45025); Formats: LP, CS, CD	46	92	—	—	—	59	—	—	42	US: Gold
"—" denotes items that did not chart or were not released in that territory. "N/A" indicates chart not yet published.

=== 1990s ===
Title	Album details	Peak chart positions									Certifications
Title	Album details	US	AUS	CAN	EUR	GER	IRE	NED	NZ	UK	Certifications
Lovescape	Released: August 27, 1991; Label: Columbia (#48610); Formats: LP, CS, CD	44	15	—	—	—	8	39	—	36	US: Gold; AUS: Gold; UK: Gold
The Christmas Album	Released: September 22, 1992; Label: Columbia (#52914); Formats: LP, CS, CD	8	30	23	—	—	—	—	—	50	US: 2× Platinum; AUS: Platinum; CAN: Platinum
Up on the Roof: Songs from the Brill Building	Released: August 31, 1993; Label: Columbia (#57529); Formats: LP, CS, CD	28	25	—	—	—	—	77	—	28	US: Gold; UK: Silver
The Christmas Album, Volume II	Released: October 11, 1994; Label: Columbia (#66465); Formats: CS, CD, MD	51	—	—	—	—	—	—	—	—	US: Gold
Tennessee Moon	Released: February 6, 1996; Label: Columbia (#67382); Formats: CS, CD	14	2	—	71	—	—	—	13	12	US: Gold; AUS: 2× Platinum; NZ: Gold; UK: Silver
The Movie Album: As Time Goes By	Released: October 26, 1998; Label: Columbia (#69540); Formats: CS, CD	31	59	—	—	72	—	—	43	68	US: Gold
"—" denotes items that did not chart or were not released in that territory.

=== 2000–present ===
Title	Album details	Peak chart positions										Certifications
Title	Album details	US	AUS	AUT	BEL	GER	IRE	NED	NZ	NOR	UK	Certifications
Three Chord Opera	Released: July 24, 2001; Label: Columbia (#85500); Formats: CS, CD	15	3	—	—	—	—	—	—	—	49	US: Gold; AUS: Gold
12 Songs	Released: November 8, 2005; Label: Columbia (#82876761312); Formats: LP, CD	4	40	11	6	20	16	10	40	—	5	US: Gold; AUS: Gold; CAN: Gold; IRE: Gold; UK: Gold
Home Before Dark	Released: May 6, 2008; Label: Columbia (#88697154652); Formats: LP, CD	1	9	11	5	14	5	2	1	19	1	US: Gold; AUS: Gold; IRE: Gold; NZ: Gold; UK: Platinum
A Cherry Cherry Christmas	Released: October 13, 2009; Label: Columbia (#88697568922); Formats: CD	60	—	—	—	—	—	—	—	—	—	
Dreams	Released: November 2, 2010; Label: Columbia (#88697798392); Formats: CD	8	5	31	50	51	28	12	5	—	8	UK: Gold
Melody Road	Released: October 21, 2014; Label: Capitol (#4702391); Formats: LP, CD, download	3	8	25	17	24	8	11	4	—	4	UK: Gold; AUS: Gold
Acoustic Christmas	Released: November 18, 2016; Label: Capitol (#B002384602); Formats: LP, CD	48	46	—	72	—	—	123	—	—	—	
Classic Diamonds (with London Symphony Orchestra)	Released: November 20, 2020; Label: Capitol (#3531805); Formats: CD	173	20	26	27	39	32	39	—	—	2	UK: Gold
Wild at Heart	Released: May 8, 2026; Label: Capitol; Formats: LP, CD, download	—	29	25	15	32	—	20	—	—	61	
"—" denotes items that did not chart or were not released in that territory.

== Soundtrack albums ==
Title	Album details	Peak chart positions									Certifications
Title	Album details	US	AUS	AUT	CAN	GER	NED	NZ	POR	UK	Certifications
Jonathan Livingston Seagull	Released: October 19, 1973; Label: Columbia (#32550); Formats: LP, CS	2	1	7	3	44	8	3	16	35	US: 2× Platinum; AUS: Gold; CAN: 2× Platinum; GER: Gold; NED: Gold; UK: Gold
The Jazz Singer	Released: November 10, 1980; Label: Capitol (#12120); Formats: LP, 8-track, CS	3	10	—	7	40	6	24	—	3	US: 5× Platinum; CAN: 3× Platinum; UK: Platinum
"—" denotes items that did not chart or were not released in that territory.

== Live albums ==
Title	Album details	Peak chart positions										Certifications
Title	Album details	US	AUS	AUT	BEL	CAN	GER	NED	NZ	NOR	UK	Certifications
Gold	Released: August 22, 1970; Label: Uni (#73084); Formats: LP, 8-track	10	34	—	—	2	35	36	—	—	23	US: 2× Platinum; UK: Silver
Hot August Night	Released: December 9, 1972; Label: MCA (#MCA 2–8000); Formats: LP, 8-track	5	1	—	—	3	27	13	1	22	21	US: 2× Platinum; AUS: 10× Platinum; NED: Platinum; NZ: 2× Platinum; UK: Gold
Love at the Greek	Released: February 4, 1977; Label: Columbia (#34404); Formats: LP, CS	8	7	6	—	8	16	1	1	—	3	US: 2× Platinum; CAN: Platinum; UK: Platinum
Hot August Night II	Released: November 10, 1987; Label: Columbia (#40990); Formats: LP, CS, CD	59	52	—	—	—	—	—	—	—	74	US: Platinum; UK: Gold
Live in America	Released: June 28, 1994; Label: Columbia (#477211); Formats: LP, CS, CD	93	39	—	—	—	—	—	—	—	96	US: Gold
Stages: Performances 1970–2002	Released: September 30, 2003; Label: Columbia (#90540); Formats: 5 CDs plus DVD	137	—	—	—	—	—	—	—	—	—	
Hot August Night/NYC: Live from Madison Square Garden	Released: August 14, 2009; Label: Columbia (#8869762841); Formats: CD	2	21	—	71	—	45	34	—	—	14	US: 2× Platinum; UK: Gold
Hot August Night III	Recorded: August 2012 at the Greek Theatre, Los Angeles, CA; Released: August 17, 2018; Label: Columbia (#B0028149-00); Formats: 2 CDs plus DVD	144	—	—	16	—	45	15	—	—	54	
"—" denotes items that did not chart or were not released in that territory. "N/A" indicates chart not yet published.

== Compilation albums ==
There have been over 150 official and unofficial compilation albums released across the world for Neil Diamond.

Below is a selected discography of compilation albums with chart history.

=== 1960s–1980s ===
Year	Title	Peak chart positions								Certifications
Year	Title	US	AUS	AUT	CAN	GER	NED	NZ	UK	Certifications
1968	Neil Diamond's Greatest Hits	100	—N/a	—	—	—	—	—N/a	—	
1970	Shilo	52	—	—	50	—	—	—N/a	—	
1970	Holly Holy	—	—	—	—	45	—	—N/a	—	
1971	Do It!	100	—	—	—	—	—	—N/a	—	
1972	Diamond's Diamonds	—	52	—	—	—	—	—N/a	—	
1973	Double Gold	36	—	—	22	—	—	—N/a	—	
1973	Rainbow	35	—	—	31	—	—	—N/a	39	US: Gold; UK: Gold
1974	His 12 Greatest Hits	29	32	—	25	50	11	30	11	US: 4× Platinum; UK: Gold
1975	Diamonds	—	—	—	—	—	—	6	—	
1976	Solitary Man	—	41	—	—	—	—	—	—	
1976	20 Super Hits	—	52	—	—	24	—	9	—	
1976	And the Singer Sings His Song	102	—	—	79	—	—	—	—	
1978	20 Golden Greats	—	—	—	94	—	—	—	2	CAN: Platinum; UK: Platinum
1978	20 Diamant Hits	—	—	7	—	4	—	—	—	GER: Gold
1980	The Very Best of Neil Diamond	—	30	—	—	—	—	—	—	
1981	Love Songs	201	37	—	—	—	—	—	43	US: Gold
1981	Diamond Forever – The 20 Best of Neil Diamond	—	—	—	—	—	7	—	—	
1982	12 Greatest Hits, Vol. II	48	21	—	—	—	—	—	32	US: 3× Platinum; CAN: Platinum; UK: Silver
1983	Classics: The Early Years	171	—	—	—	—	—	—	—	US: Platinum
1984	The Very Best of Neil Diamond	—	—	—	—	—	—	—	33	
1985	Diamonds – The Very Best Of	—	—	—	—	16	41	—	—	
"—" denotes items that did not chart or were not released in that territory. "N/A" indicates chart not yet published.

=== 1990–present ===
Year	Title	Peak chart positions										Certifications
Year	Title	US	AUS	AUT	BEL	GER	IRE	NED	NZ	NOR	UK	Certifications
1992	The Essential Collection	—	17	—	—	—	—	—	—	—	—	
1992	The Greatest Hits: 1966–1992	90	1	—	—	—	1	20	2	—	1	US: 3× Platinum; AUS: 7× Platinum; NED: Gold; NZ: Platinum; UK: Platinum
1996	The Best of Neil Diamond	—	—	—	—	—	—	—	—	—	7	UK: Platinum
1996	The Ultimate Collection	—	30	—	19	68	—	14	25	—	5	NED: Gold; UK: Platinum
1996	In My Lifetime	122	50	—	—	—	—	—	—	—	—	US: Gold
1999	The Neil Diamond Collection	—	—	—	—	—	—	—	—	—	—	
2001	The Essential Neil Diamond	90	9	—	—	—	12	81	5	12	11	US: 2× Platinum; AUS: Platinum; NZ: 3× Platinum; UK: Platinum
2005	The Essential Greatest Hits Collection; 2005 Australian Tour Edition	—	8	—	—	—	—	—	—	—	—	AUS: Gold
2005	The Essential Greatest Hits Collection; 2005 New Zealand Tour Edition	—	—	—	—	—	—	—	9	—	—	NZ: 2× Platinum
2010	Icon	—	—	—	—	—	—	—	28	—	—	
2011	The Bang Years 1966–1968	—	—	—	86	—	—	—	—	—	88	
2011	The Very Best of Neil Diamond: The Original Studio Recordings	45	40	—	183	—	19	4	9	—	5	UK: Platinum
2014	All-Time Greatest Hits	15	33	—	68	—	25	61	4	—	18	AUS: Gold; UK: 2× Platinum
2015	All-Time Greatest Hits (Deluxe Edition)	—	—	—	10	—	—	—	—	—	—	
2017	50th Anniversary Collection	78	—	55	38	—	—	29	—	—	—	
"—" denotes items that did not chart or were not released in that territory.

== Singles ==
=== 1960s ===
Year	Title	B-side	Peak chart positions										Certifications	Album
Year	Title	B-side	US	US Adult	AUS	CAN	CAN Adult	GER	IRE	NED	NZ	UK	Certifications	Album
1962	"You Are My Love at Last" (with Jack Packer)	"What Will I Do" (with Jack Packer)	—	—	—	—	—	—	—	—	—	—		Non-album singles
1962	"I'm Afraid" (with Jack Packer)	"Till You've Tried Love" (with Jack Packer)	—	—	—	—	—	—	—	—	—	—		Non-album singles
1963	"At Night"	"Clown Town"	—	—	—	—	—	—	—	—	—	—		Non-album singles
1966	"Solitary Man"	"Do It"	55	—	—	56	—	—	—	—	—	59 (Note: Chart position is from the official UK "Breakers List".)		The Feel of Neil Diamond
1966	"Cherry, Cherry"	"I'll Come Running"	6	—	40	8	—	—	—	—	—	52		The Feel of Neil Diamond
1966	"I Got the Feelin' (Oh No No)"	"The Boat That I Row"	16	—	67	6	—	—	—	—	—	—		The Feel of Neil Diamond
1967	"You Got to Me"	"Someday Baby"	18	—	69	18	—	—	—	—	—	—		Just for You
1967	"Girl, You'll Be a Woman Soon"	"You'll Forget"	10	—	34	8	—	—	—	27	—	—		Just for You
1967	"Thank the Lord for the Night Time"	"The Long Way Home"	13	—	53	4	—	—	—	—	—	—		Just for You
1967	"Kentucky Woman"	"The Time Is Now"	22	—	58	16	—	—	—	—	10	—		Neil Diamond's; Greatest Hits
1967	"New Orleans"	"Hanky Panky"	51	—	55	32	—	—	—	—	—	—		Neil Diamond's; Greatest Hits
1968	"Red Red Wine"	"Red Rubber Ball"	62	—	78	58	—	—	—	—	—	—		Neil Diamond's; Greatest Hits
1968	"Brooklyn Roads"	"Holiday Inn Blues"	58	—	—	34	—	—	—	—	—	—		Velvet Gloves and Spit
1968	"Two-Bit Manchild"	"Broad Old Woman (6 AM Insanity)"	66	—	83	36	—	—	—	—	17	—		Velvet Gloves and Spit
1968	"Sunday Sun"	"Honey Drippin' Times"	68	—	96	39	—	—	—	—	—	—		Velvet Gloves and Spit
1969	"Brother Love's; Travelling Salvation Show"	"A Modern Day Version of Love"	22	—	44	9	—	—	—	—	5	—		Brother Love's; Travelling Salvation Show (AKA Sweet Caroline)
1969	"Sweet Caroline"	"Dig In"	4	3	3	3	2	37	9	16	—	8	US: Platinum; UK: 4× Platinum	Brother Love's; Travelling Salvation Show (AKA Sweet Caroline)
1969	"Holly Holy"	"Hurtin' You Don't Come Easy"	6	5	3	2	6	—	—	—	6	—	US: Platinum	Touching You, Touching Me
"—" denotes items that did not chart or were not released in that territory.

=== 1970s ===
Year	Title	B-side	Peak chart positions										Certifications	Album
Year	Title	B-side	US	US Adult	AUS	CAN	CAN Adult	GER	IRE	NED	NZ	UK	Certifications	Album
1970	"Shilo" (alternative version)	"La Bamba"	24	8	23	15	33	21	—	—	—	—		Shilo
1970	"Until It's Time for You to Go"	"And the Singer Sings His Song"	53	11	—	48	14	—	—	—	—	—		Touching You, Touching Me
1970	"And the Grass Won't Pay No Mind"	"Merry-Go-Round"	—	—	92	—	—	—	—	—	—	—		Brother Love's; Travelling Salvation Show (AKA Sweet Caroline)
1970	"Solitary Man" (re-issue)	"The Time Is Now"	21	6	36	31	—	—	—	—	—	—		The Feel of Neil Diamond
1970	"Soolaimón"	"And the Grass Won't Pay No Mind"	30	5	23	7	—	22	—	—	14	—		Tap Root Manuscript
1970	"Cracklin' Rosie"	"Lordy" (live)	1	2	2	1	—	7	2	6	1	3	US: Platinum; UK: Gold	Tap Root Manuscript
1970	"He Ain't Heavy, He's My Brother"	"Free Life"	20	4	94	4	9	—	—	—	18	52		Tap Root Manuscript
1970	"Do It"	"Hanky Panky"	36	25	—	18	—	—	—	16	—	—		Do It
1971	"I Am... I Said"	"Done Too Soon"	4	2	10	2	—	3	1	6	1	4	UK: Silver	Stones
1971	"I Am... I Said"	"Done Too Soon"	65	37	—	55	—	—	—	—	—	—		Stones
1971	"I'm a Believer"	"Crooked Street"	51	31	—	61	21	23	—	29	—	—		Non-album single
1971	"Stones"	"Crunchy Granola Suite"	14	2	24	15	—	26	—	—	7	—		Stones
1972	"Song Sung Blue"	"Gitchy Goomy"	1	1	5	2	9	6	17	3	1	14	US: Gold	Moods
1972	"Play Me"	"Porcupine Pie"	11	3	25	6	3	28	—	—	—	55		Moods
1972	"Walk on Water"	"High Rolling Man"	17	2	74	8	33	39	—	—	14	—		Moods
1973	"Cherry, Cherry" (live)	"Morningside" (live)	31	19	52	40	44	—	—	—	—	—		Hot August Night
1973	"The Long Way Home"	"Monday, Monday"	91	41	49	84	—	—	—	—	—	—		Non-album single
1973	"The Last Thing on My Mind"	"Canta Libre" (live)	56	15	47	48	35	—	—	—	—	—		Rainbow
1973	"Be"	"Flight of the Gull" (instrumental)	34	11	29	27	15	—	—	—	6	—		Jonathan; Livingston Seagull
1974	"Skybird"	"Lonely Looking Sky"	75	24	74	43	12	—	—	6	—	—		Jonathan; Livingston Seagull
1974	"Longfellow Serenade"	"Rosemary's Wine"	5	1	7	7	1	2	—	9	29	60		Serenade
1975	"I've Been This Way Before"	"Reggae Strut"	34	1	77	57	3	46	—	—	—	—		Serenade
1975	"The Last Picasso"	"The Gift of Song"	—	7	—	97	4	43	—	—	—	—		Serenade
1976	"If You Know What I Mean"	"Street Life"	11	1	27	19	1	33	—	5	8	35		Beautiful Noise
1976	"Don't Think... Feel"	"Home Is a Wounded Heart"	43	4	—	80	5	—	—	—	—	—		Beautiful Noise
1976	"Beautiful Noise"	"Signs"	—	8	—	—	2	6	4	3	—	13	UK: Silver	Beautiful Noise
1977	"Stargazer"	"Jungletime"	—	—	—	—	—	39	—	24	—	—		Beautiful Noise
1977	"Lady-Oh"	"Surviving the Life"	—	—	—	—	—	—	—	19	—	—		Beautiful Noise
1977	"Desiree"	"Once in a While"	16	1	29	8	1	25	6	21	5	39		I'm Glad You're; Here with Me Tonight
1978	"Let Me Take You in My Arms Again"	"As If"	—	—	—	—	—	25	—	29	—	—		I'm Glad You're; Here with Me Tonight
1978	"You Don't Bring Me Flowers" (with Barbra Streisand)	"You Don't Bring Me Flowers" (instrumental)	1	3	4	1	1	—	14	14	3	5	US: Platinum; CAN: Gold; NZ: Gold; UK: Gold	You Don't; Bring Me Flowers
1979	"Forever in Blue Jeans"	"Remember Me"	20	2	41	10	2	31	4	—	22	16	UK: Gold	You Don't; Bring Me Flowers
1979	"Say Maybe"	"Diamond Girls"	55	3	—	75	13	—	—	—	—	—		You Don't; Bring Me Flowers
1979	"The American Popular Song"	"Memphis Flyer"	—	—	—	—	—	—	—	38	—	—		You Don't; Bring Me Flowers
1979	"September Morn'"	"I'm a Believer"	17	2	23	15	1	—	—	—	19	—		September Morn
"—" denotes items that did not chart or were not released in that territory.

=== 1980s ===
Year	Title	B-side	Peak chart positions										Certifications	Album
Year	Title	B-side	US	US Adult	AUS	CAN	CAN Adult	GER	IRE	NED	NZ	UK	Certifications	Album
1980	"The Good Lord Loves You"	"Jazz Time"	67	23	—	—	34	—	—	—	—	—		September Morn
1980	"Love on the Rocks"	"Acapulco"	2	3	29	11	—	70	10	26	32	17	UK: Silver	The Jazz Singer
1981	"Hello Again"	"Amazed and Confused"	6	3	—	11	—	—	18	37	—	51	UK: Silver	The Jazz Singer
1981	"America"	"Songs of Life"	8	1	—	45	15	—	—	—	—	—		The Jazz Singer
1981	"Yesterday's Songs"	"Guitar Heaven"	11	1	75	15	1	—	—	—	—	—		On the Way to the Sky
1982	"On the Way to the Sky"	"Save Me"	27	4	—	—	1	—	—	—	—	—		On the Way to the Sky
1982	"Be Mine Tonight"	"Right by You"	35	2	—	—	3	—	—	—	—	—		On the Way to the Sky
1982	"Heartlight"	"You Don't Know Me"	5	1	29	6	1	—	21	—	23	47		Heartlight
1983	"I'm Alive"	"Lost Among the Stars"	35	4	—	—	1	—	—	—	—	—		Heartlight
1983	"Front Page Story"	"I'm Guilty"	65	5	—	—	9	—	—	—	—	—		Heartlight
1984	"Turn Around"	"Brooklyn on a Saturday Night"	62	4	—	—	4	—	—	—	—	—		Primitive
1984	"Sleep with Me Tonight"	"One-by-One"	—	24	—	—	3	—	—	—	—	—		Primitive
1984	"You Make It Feel Like Christmas"	"Crazy"	—	28	—	—	—	—	—	—	—	—		Primitive
1986	"Headed for the Future"	"Angel"	53	10	—	83	7	—	—	—	—	—		Headed for the Future
1986	"The Story of My Life"	"Love Doesn't Live Here Anymore"	—	11	—	—	14	—	—	—	—	—		Headed for the Future
1987	"I Dreamed a Dream" (live)	"Sweet Caroline" (live)	—	13	—	—	13	—	—	—	—	90		Hot August Night II
1989	"This Time"	"If I Couldn't See You Again"	—	9	—	92	—	—	17	—	—	84		The Best Years of Our Lives
1989	"The Best Years of Our Lives"	"Carmelita's Eyes"	—	7	—	82	—	—	—	—	—	—		The Best Years of Our Lives
1989	"Baby Can I Hold You"	No B-side	—	28	—	—	—	—	—	—	—	—		The Best Years of Our Lives
"—" denotes items that did not chart or were not released in that territory.

=== 1990s ===
Year	Title	B-side	Peak chart positions					Album
Year	Title	B-side	US Adult	CAN	AUS	CAN Adult	UK	Album
1991	"If There Were No Dreams"	"Lonely Lady #17"	14	58	—	8	—	Lovescape
1991	"Don't Turn Around"	"Lonely Lady #17"	19	79	117	10	—	Lovescape
1992	"Hooked on the Memory of You" (with Kim Carnes)	"Hard Times for Lovers" (with Kim Carnes)	23	—	116	—	—	Lovescape
1992	"All I Really Need Is You"	"All I Really Need Is You" (live)	—	—	—	—	—	Lovescape
1992	"Morning Has Broken"	"Santa Claus Is Comin' to Town"	—	—	154	—	36	The Christmas Album
1993	"You've Lost That Lovin' Feelin'" (with Dolly Parton)	"Save the Last Dance for Me"	—	—	133	—	—	Up on the Roof: Songs from the Brill Building
1993	"Will You Love Me Tomorrow"	"Make It Feel Like Christmas"	—	—	—	—	—	Up on the Roof: Songs from the Brill Building
1994	"Play Me" (live)	No B-side	—	—	—	—	—	Live in America
1996	"Marry Me" (with Buffy Lawson)	"Kentucky Woman"/"I Am...I Said" (live)	—	—	149	—	—	Tennessee Moon
1996	"One Good Love" (with Waylon Jennings)	"Kentucky Woman"	—	—	—	—	—	Tennessee Moon
1998	"As Time Goes By"	"Callout Hook #1"/"Callout Hook #2"	—	—	—	—	—	The Movie Album: As Time Goes By
"—" denotes items that did not chart or were not released in that territory.

=== 2000–present ===
Year	Title	Peak chart positions				Album
Year	Title	US Adult	CAN Adult	UK	UK Down.	Album
2001	"You Are the Best Part of Me"	28	—	—	—	Three Chord Opera
2001	"A Mission of Love"	—	—	—	—	Three Chord Opera
2006	"Delirious Love" (with Brian Wilson)	27	—	—	—	12 Songs
2008	"Pretty Amazing Grace"	30	—	49	42	Home Before Dark
2008	"If I Don't See You Again"	—	—	—	—	Home Before Dark
2008	"Sweet Caroline" (1st re-entry)	—	—	63	56	Non-album single
2009	"Cherry Cherry Christmas"	4	32	—	—	A Cherry Cherry Christmas
2010	"Yesterday"	—	—	—	—	Dreams
2010	"Midnight Train to Georgia"	—	—	151	—	Dreams
2013	"The Freedom Song (They'll Never Take Us Down)"	—	—	—	—	Non-album single
2014	"Something Blue"	—	—	—	78	Melody Road
2015	"Sunny Disposition"	—	—	—	—	Melody Road
2016	"The Christmas Medley" (Acoustic Christmas)	10	—	—	—	Acoustic Christmas
2021	"Sweet Caroline" (2nd re-entry)	—	—	20	3	Non-album single
"—" denotes items that did not chart or were not released in that territory.
