= His 12 Greatest Hits =

Greatest hits album by Neil Diamond
- Released: 1974
- Recorded: 1968–1972
- Genre: Pop rock
- Length: 44:03
- Label: MCA
- Producers: Tom Catalano, Tommy Cogbill, Chips Moman, Chip Taylor, Neil Diamond

Neil Diamond chronology
| Jonathan Livingston Seagull (1973) | His 12 Greatest Hits (1974) | Serenade (1974) |

Professional ratings
Review scores
| Source | Rating |
|---|---|
| AllMusic | 4.5/5 stars |

His 12 Greatest Hits is a compilation album by the American singer-songwriter Neil Diamond, issued in 1974 by MCA Records. The album contains songs from Diamond's tenure with Uni Records, spanning 1968 to 1972. After Diamond had returned to Columbia Records, his earlier works were reissued by MCA, the parent company of Uni Records that had folded in the early 1970s.

Of the album's twelve songs, only ten were presented in their original studio versions. "Holly Holy" and "Sweet Caroline" were live recordings, taken from the live album Hot August Night (1972). On the 1985 CD release of His 12 Greatest Hits, the studio versions appeared instead, but both songs were remixed and "Holly Holy" was a different version with a different vocal for a good part of the song. A later reissue in 1993 reinstated the live versions of these two tracks.

In 1982, Columbia released the follow-up compilation 12 Greatest Hits, Volume II, containing songs from the years 1973–1981.

== Track listing ==
All tracks are written by Neil Diamond.

Side one
| No. | Title | Original release | Length |
|---|---|---|---|
| 1. | "Sweet Caroline (Live, from Hot August Night)" | Single (included on reissue of Brother Love's Travelling Salvation Show) | 4:15 |
| 2. | "Brother Love's Travelling Salvation Show" | Brother Love's Travelling Salvation Show | 3:26 |
| 3. | "Shilo (1970 remake from the Velvet Gloves and Spit reissue)" | Just for You | 2:59 |
| 4. | "Holly Holy (Live, from Hot August Night)" | Touching You, Touching Me | 5:40 |
| 5. | "Brooklyn Roads" | Velvet Gloves and Spit | 3:39 |
| 6. | "Cracklin' Rosie" | Tap Root Manuscript | 3:00 |

Side two
| No. | Title | Original release | Length |
|---|---|---|---|
| 1. | "Play Me" | Moods | 3:49 |
| 2. | "Done Too Soon" | Tap Root Manuscript | 2:45 |
| 3. | "Stones" | Stones | 3:03 |
| 4. | "Song Sung Blue" | Moods | 3:15 |
| 5. | "Soolaimón" | Tap Root Manuscript | 4:33 |
| 6. | "I Am... I Said" | Stones | 3:32 |
| Total length: | | | 44:03 |

== Personnel ==
- Tom Catalano – producer (1, 3, 4, 6–12)
- Neil Diamond – producer (7, 8, 10, 11)
- Tommy Cogbill – producer (2)
- Chips Moman – producer (2)
- Chip Taylor – producer (5)
- Lee Holdridge – conductor (1, 4, 7, 9, 10), arranger (3, 7, 9, 10)
- Artie Schroeck – conductor (5)
- Don Randi – arranger (6)
- Marty Paich – arranger (12), conductor (12)
- Larry Muhoberac – arranger (12), conductor (12)
- Harry Langdon – cover photo

== Charts ==
The album reached number 29 on the Billboard 200 chart. It was certified gold by the RIAA in 1974 and earned quadruple platinum status in 1993 for sales of four million units in the US.

| Chart (1974) | Peak position |
|---|---|
| US Billboard 200 | 29 |

== Certifications ==
| Region | Certification | Certified units/sales |
|---|---|---|
| United Kingdom (BPI) | Gold | 100,000^{^} |
| United States (RIAA) | 4× Platinum | 4,000,000^{^} |
^{^} Shipments figures based on certification alone.
