= 50 Year Anniversary World Tour (Neil Diamond) =

2017 concert tour by Neil Diamond

- Tour by Neil Diamond
- Promotional poster for the tour
- Location: North America; Europe; Oceania
- Start date: April 7, 2017
- End date: October 19, 2017 (last show); January 22, 2018 (announced)
- Legs: 3
- No. of shows: 39 in North America; 16 in Europe; 55 in total

Neil Diamond concert chronology
- Melody Road Tour (2015); 50 Year Anniversary World Tour (2017)

50 Year Anniversary World Tour is a Neil Diamond tour that marked the 50th Anniversary of Diamond's first hit single, "Solitary Man," released in 1966. It began in Fresno, California on April 7, 2017, and concluded at The O2 Arena in London on October 19, 2017. The tour began just after the March release of a 50-song, three-disc career-spanning box set titled Neil Diamond 50 – 50th Anniversary Collection. The Oceania tour was announced on November 10, 2017 and cancelled on January 22, 2018, after Diamond announced he had been diagnosed with Parkinson's disease.

== Set list ==
1. "In My Lifetime"
2. "Cherry, Cherry"
3. "You Got to Me"
4. "Solitary Man"
5. "Love on the Rocks"
6. "Hello Again"
7. "Play Me"
8. "Song Sung Blue"
9. "Beautiful Noise"
10. "Desiree"
11. "Dry Your Eyes"
12. "If You Know What I Mean"
13. "Forever in Blue Jeans"
14. "You Don't Bring Me Flowers"
15. "Red Red Wine"
16. "I'm a Believer"
17. "Girl, You'll Be a Woman Soon"
18. "Brooklyn Road"
19. "Stones"
20. "Be"
21. "Lonely Looking Sky"
22. "Skybird"
23. "Jazz Time"
24. "Soolaimon"
25. "Holly Holy"
26. "I Am ...I Said"
27. "Sweet Caroline"
28. "Cracklin' Rosie"
29. "Brother Love's Travelling Salvation Show"

== Shows ==
Date	City	Country	Venue	Attendance	Box Office
North America
April 7, 2017	Fresno	United States	Save Mart Center	8,674 / 8,674	$806,775
April 9, 2017	Salt Lake City	United States	Vivint Smart Home Arena	11,887 / 11,887	$994,905
April 12, 2017	St. Louis	United States	Scottrade Center	13,425 / 13,425	$1,176,555
April 14, 2017	Omaha	United States	CenturyLink Center Omaha	13,658 / 13,658	$1,130,176
April 16, 2017	Oklahoma City	United States	Chesapeake Energy Arena	8,106 / 8,106	$727,285
April 19, 2017	Nashville	United States	Bridgestone Arena	11,739 / 14,162	$922,868
April 21, 2017	Louisville	United States	KFC Yum! Center	12,649 / 12,649	$1,125,696
April 23, 2017	Tampa	United States	Amalie Arena	13,239 / 13,239	$1,213,850
April 26, 2017	Sunrise	United States	BB&T Center	10,110 / 10,110	$933,714
April 28, 2017	Charlotte	United States	Spectrum Center	11,868 / 11,868	$1,257,919
April 30, 2017	Atlanta	United States	Philips Arena	12,235 / 13,197	$1,207,288
May 2, 2017	New Orleans	United States	Smoothie King Center	9,582 / 9,582	$913,183
May 21, 2017	Des Moines	United States	Wells Fargo Arena	13,590 / 13,590	$1,113,574
May 24, 2017	Saint Paul	United States	Xcel Energy Center	17,002 / 17,002	$1,682,469
May 26, 2017	Indianapolis	United States	Bankers Life Fieldhouse	10,887 / 10,887	$1,093,598
May 28, 2017	Chicago	United States	United Center	13,890 / 13,890	$1,741,243
May 30, 2017	Cleveland	United States	Quicken Loans Arena	12,660 / 12,660	$1,260,995
June 2, 2017	Auburn Hills	United States	The Palace of Auburn Hills	13,889 / 13,889	$1,383,517
June 4, 2017	Rochester	United States	Blue Cross Arena	10,833 / 10,833	$930,258
June 7, 2017	Toronto	Canada	Air Canada Centre	15,095 / 15,095	$1,099,640
June 9, 2017	Baltimore	United States	Royal Farms Arena	10,782 / 10,782	$1,113,582
June 11, 2017	Uncasville	United States	Mohegan Sun Arena	—	—
June 15, 2017	New York City	United States	Madison Square Garden	27,303 / 31,488	$3,306,191
June 17, 2017	New York City	United States	Madison Square Garden	27,303 / 31,488	$3,306,191
June 20, 2017	Philadelphia	United States	Wells Fargo Center	12,509 / 12,509	$1,347,577
June 22, 2017	Bethel	United States	Bethel Woods Center for the Arts	10,443 / 16,502	$813,842
July 14, 2017	Wichita	United States	Intrust Bank Arena	8,872 / 8,872	$810,741
July 16, 2017	Houston	United States	Toyota Center	10,303 / 10,303	$1,093,133
July 18, 2017	Dallas	United States	American Airlines Center	12,549 / 12,549	$1,344,965
July 21, 2017	Denver	United States	Pepsi Center	11,330 / 11,330	$1,152,608
July 24, 2017	Vancouver	Canada	Rogers Arena	9,973 / 9,973	$782,284
July 26, 2017	Seattle	United States	KeyArena	10,961 / 10,961	$1,347,577
July 28, 2017	Portland	United States	Moda Center	12,441 / 12,441	$1,136,192
July 30, 2017	San Jose	United States	SAP Center	10,961 / 10,961	$1,080,551
August 2, 2017	Sacramento	United States	Golden 1 Center	11,878 / 11,878	$1,181,378
August 4, 2017	Phoenix	United States	Talking Stick Resort Arena	12,989 / 12,989	$1,183,928
August 8, 2017	San Diego	United States	Valley View Casino Center	9,430 / 9,430	$946,314
August 10, 2017	Inglewood	United States	The Forum	—	—
August 12, 2017	Inglewood	United States	The Forum	—	—
Europe
September 10, 2017	Amsterdam	Netherlands	Ziggo Dome	23,046 / 23,046 (Note: The score data is combined from the shows held at the Ziggo Dome on September 10 and 23, respectively.)	$2,055,295
September 13, 2017	Zürich	Switzerland	Hallenstadion	5,678 / 5,678	$668,074
September 16, 2017	Mannheim	Germany	SAP Arena	7,570 / 7,570	$777,998
September 19, 2017	Vienna	Austria	Wiener Stadthalle	9,485 / 9,485	$965,000
September 21, 2017	Munich	Germany	Olympiahalle	9,102 / 9,102	$937,246
September 23, 2017	Amsterdam	Netherlands	Ziggo Dome		
September 26, 2017	Hamburg	Germany	Barclaycard Arena	9,356 / 9,356	$979,513
September 28, 2017	Antwerp	Belgium	Sportpaleis	15,309 / 15,309	$1,391,522
October 1, 2017	Manchester	England	Manchester Arena	13,132 / 13,132	$1,610,369
October 3, 2017	Glasgow	Scotland	The SSE Hydro	10,617 / 10,617	$1,321,032
October 5, 2017	Leeds	England	First Direct Arena	10,207 / 10,207	$1,201,851
October 8, 2017	Belfast	Northern Ireland	The SSE Arena	7,801 / 7,801	$911,560
October 10, 2017	Dublin	Ireland	3Arena	8,204 / 8,204	$992,986
October 13, 2017	Birmingham	England	Barclaycard Arena	12,389 / 12,389	$1,516,835
October 15, 2017	Birmingham	England	Genting Arena	5,672 / 5,672	$704,039
October 17, 2017	London	England	The O_{2} Arena	26,326 / 26,326	$3,121,670
October 19, 2017	London	England	The O_{2} Arena	26,326 / 26,326	$3,121,670
TOTAL				306,055 / 319,768 (96%)	$2,130,156

== Cancelled shows ==
Date	City	Country	Venue	Reason
Leg 3 — Oceania
March 15, 2018	Christchurch	New Zealand	Rugby League Park	Parkinson's disease diagnosis
March 17, 2018	Napier	New Zealand	Mission Estate	Parkinson's disease diagnosis
March 20, 2018	Townsville	Australia	Willows Sports Complex	Parkinson's disease diagnosis
March 22, 2018	Sunshine Coast	Australia	Sunshine Coast Stadium	Parkinson's disease diagnosis
March 24, 2018	Brisbane	Australia	Brisbane Entertainment Centre	Parkinson's disease diagnosis
March 27, 2018	Sydney	Australia	Sydney Super Dome	Parkinson's disease diagnosis
March 31, 2018	Sutton Grange	Australia	Sutton Grange Winery	Parkinson's disease diagnosis
April 3, 2018	Melbourne	Australia	Rod Laver Arena	Parkinson's disease diagnosis
April 7, 2018	Hunter Valley	Australia	Roche Estate	Parkinson's disease diagnosis
April 11, 2018	Adelaide	Australia	Botanic Park	Parkinson's disease diagnosis
April 14, 2018	Perth	Australia	Perth Arena	Parkinson's disease diagnosis
