= The Neil Diamond Collection =

Compilation album by Neil Diamond
- Released: November 23, 1999
- Recorded: 1968–1972
- Genre: Rock
- Length: 65:12
- Label: MCA

Neil Diamond chronology
20th Century Masters – The Millennium Collection: The Best of Neil Diamond (1999)	The Neil Diamond Collection (1999)	Three Chord Opera (2001)

Professional ratings
Review scores
Source	Rating
Allmusic	5/5 stars

The Neil Diamond Collection is a 1999 compilation album by Neil Diamond. In 2003, the album was ranked number 222 on Rolling Stone magazine's list of the 500 greatest albums of all time, and ranked 224 as of 2012. It was dropped from the list in the 2020 edition.

== Track listing ==
"He Ain't Heavy, He's My Brother" written by Bob Russell and Bobby Scott; all other titles written by Neil Diamond.

No.	Title	Length
1.	"Sweet Caroline"	3:21
2.	"Cracklin' Rosie"	3:01
3.	"Song Sung Blue"	3:17
4.	"Play Me"	3:52
5.	"Brooklyn Roads"	3:39
6.	"Shilo"	2:59
7.	"Crunchy Granola Suite"	2:55
8.	"And the Grass Won't Pay No Mind"	3:32
9.	"Holly Holy"	4:41
10.	"Brother Love's Travelling Salvation Show"	3:29
11.	"Stones"	3:06
12.	"Soolaimon"	4:24
13.	"Walk on Water"	3:05
14.	"Cherry, Cherry" (live)	4:52
15.	"I Am...I Said"	3:35
16.	"Done Too Soon"	2:43
17.	"Morningside"	4:20
18.	"He Ain't Heavy, He's My Brother"	4:10
