= Neil Diamond 50 – 50th Anniversary Collection =

Compilation album by Neil Diamond
- Released: March 31, 2017
- Recorded: 1966–2014
- Genre: Pop rock
- Labels: Universal Music Group and Capitol Music Group

Neil Diamond chronology
| Acoustic Christmas (2016) | Neil Diamond 50 – 50th Anniversary Collection (2017) | Hot August Night III (2018) |

Professional ratings
Review scores
| Source | Rating |
|---|---|
| AllMusic | 4.0/5 stars |

Neil Diamond 50 – 50th Anniversary Collection is a retrospective of 50 Neil Diamond songs recorded between 1966 and 2014. It was released in March 2017.

Diamond selected the songs for Neil Diamond 50. Its tracks range from the 1966 album The Feel of Neil Diamond to 2014's Melody Road. A three-disc set with liner notes by David Fricke, it includes songs that Rolling Stone described as "staples in the American pop songbook".

The collection was also issued in a limited edition 6-disc book, comprising 115 tracks, and including 12 previously unreleased songs.

A 50th Anniversary World Tour coincided with the release of the box. It began on April 7, 2017, in Fresno, California.

== Track listing ==
All tracks are written by Neil Diamond, except where noted.

Disc 1
| No. | Title | Length |
|---|---|---|
| 1. | "Solitary Man" (single version) | 2:33 |
| 2. | "Cherry, Cherry" (single version) | 2:42 |
| 3. | "I Got the Feelin' (Oh No, No)" | 2:09 |
| 4. | "You Got to Me" | 2:53 |
| 5. | "Girl, You'll Be a Woman Soon" | 3:20 |
| 6. | "I'm a Believer" | 2:47 |
| 7. | "Thank the Lord for the Night Time" (single version) | 3:02 |
| 8. | "Red Red Wine" | 2:42 |
| 9. | "Sunday Sun" (album version) | 2:47 |
| 10. | "Shilo" (single version) | 3:26 |
| 11. | "Kentucky Woman" (single version) | 2:26 |
| 12. | "Brooklyn Roads" | 3:38 |
| 13. | "Glory Road" | 3:21 |
| 14. | "Holly Holy" (single version) | 4:39 |
| 15. | "And the Grass Won't Pay No Mind" | 3:33 |
| 16. | "Sweet Caroline" (album version) | 3:23 |
| 17. | "Brother Love's Traveling Salvation Show" | 3:33 |

Disc 2
| No. | Title | Length |
|---|---|---|
| 1. | "Done Too Soon" | 2:42 |
| 2. | "Soolaimon" (album version) | 4:12 |
| 3. | "Cracklin' Rosie" (single version) | 2:58 |
| 4. | "Crunchy Granola Suite" (single version) | 2:55 |
| 5. | "I Am...I Said" (single version) | 3:35 |
| 6. | "Stones" | 3:06 |
| 7. | "Morningside" | 4:08 |
| 8. | "Song Sung Blue" (single version) | 3:16 |
| 9. | "Play Me" | 3:51 |
| 10. | "Be (Recapitulation and Farewell to Fletcher)" | 3:31 |
| 11. | "Skybird" | 2:21 |
| 12. | "Lonely Looking Sky" | 3:11 |
| 13. | "I've Been This Way Before" | 3:46 |
| 14. | "Longfellow Serenade" | 3:52 |
| 15. | "Beautiful Noise" | 3:24 |
| 16. | "Street Life" | 3:00 |
| 17. | "If You Know What I Mean" | 3:45 |

Disc 3
| No. | Title | Writer(s) | Length |
|---|---|---|---|
| 1. | "Desiree" | | 3:21 |
| 2. | "You Don't Bring Me Flowers" (solo version) | Alan Bergman, Marilyn Bergman, Diamond | 3:10 |
| 3. | "Forever in Blue Jeans" | Richard Bennett, Diamond | 3:36 |
| 4. | "September Morn" | Gilbert Bécaud, Diamond | 3:53 |
| 5. | "The Story of My Life" | | 3:43 |
| 6. | "Yesterday's Songs" (beginning 3 seconds of original recording missing) | | 2:48 |
| 7. | "I Believe in Happy Endings" | | 4:28 |
| 8. | "Hello Again" | Alan Lindgren, Diamond | 4:05 |
| 9. | "Love on the Rocks" | Bécaud, Diamond | 3:38 |
| 10. | "Heartlight" | Burt Bacharach, Diamond, Carole Beyer Sager | 4:26 |
| 11. | "Lady-Oh" | | 3:51 |
| 12. | "Pretty Amazing Grace" | | 4:54 |
| 13. | "Hell Yeah" | | 4:26 |
| 14. | "We" | | 3:49 |
| 15. | "The Art of Love" | | 4:06 |
| 16. | "America" | | 4:22 |

== Charts ==
Chart performance for 50th Anniversary Collection
| Chart (2017) | Peak position |
|---|---|
| Austrian Albums (Ö3 Austria) | 55 |
| Belgian Albums (Ultratop Flanders) | 38 |
| Belgian Albums (Ultratop Wallonia) | 147 |
| Dutch Albums (Album Top 100) | 29 |
| Swiss Albums (Schweizer Hitparade) | 100 |
| US Billboard 200 | 78 |
