= Hot August Night/NYC: Live from Madison Square Garden =

Hot August Night/NYC

Live album by Neil Diamond
- Released: August 14, 2009 (Walmart); February 9, 2010 (Commercially); November 24, 2014 (UMe)
- Recorded: August 14, 2008
- Genre: Rock
- Label: Columbia; UMe

Neil Diamond chronology
The Best of Neil Diamond (2008)	Hot August Night/NYC (2009)	A Cherry Cherry Christmas (2009)

Professional ratings
Review scores
Source	Rating
Allmusic	2.5/5 stars

Hot August Night/NYC is a DVD release from Neil Diamond released on August 14, 2009. The DVD features songs from Diamond's four shows at Madison Square Garden during his 2008 tour. An accompanying 2-CD album was released at the same time.

An edited, hour-long special featuring songs from this DVD was shown on CBS on the night of the disc's release. The special was watched by 13 million viewers.

This is the third in a series of similarly titled live albums; it was preceded by Hot August Night (1972) and Hot August Night II (1987).

== Track listing ==
1. "Holly Holy"
2. "Street Life"
3. "Beautiful Noise"
4. "Love on the Rocks"
5. "Play Me"
6. "Cherry, Cherry"
7. "Thank the Lord for the Night Time"
8. "Home Before Dark"
9. "Don't Go There"
10. "Pretty Amazing Grace"
11. "Crunchy Granola Suite"
12. "Done Too Soon"
13. "Brooklyn Roads"
14. "I Am...I Said"
15. "Solitary Man"
16. "Kentucky Woman"
17. "Forever in Blue Jeans"
18. "Sweet Caroline"
19. "Sweet Caroline" (reprise)
20. "You Don't Bring Me Flowers"
21. "Song Sung Blue"
22. "I'm a Believer"
23. "Man of God"
24. "Hell Yeah"
25. "Cracklin' Rosie"
26. "America"
27. "Brother Love's Travelling Salvation Show"

== Personnel ==
- Guitar: Hadley Hockensmith, Doug Rhone
- Bass: Reinie Press
- Keyboards: Tom Hensley, Alan Lindgren
- Drums: Ron Tutt
- Percussion: King Errisson
- Saxophone: Larry Klimas, Don Markese
- Horns: John Fumo, Arturo Velasco
- Backing Vocals: Linda Press, Julia Waters Tillman, Maxine Waters

== Charts ==
=== Weekly charts ===
Chart (2009–2010)	Peak position
Australian Albums (ARIA)	21
Belgian Albums (Ultratop Flanders)	71
Canadian Albums (Nielsen SoundScan)	36
Dutch Albums (Album Top 100)	34
European Albums (Billboard)	45
German Albums (Offizielle Top 100)	45
Greek Albums (IFPI)	23
Irish Albums (IRMA)	88
Scottish Albums (OCC)	6
Spanish Albums (Promusicae)	54
Swiss Albums (Schweizer Hitparade)	91
UK Albums (OCC)	14
US Billboard 200	2

=== Year-end charts ===
Chart (2009)	Position
US Billboard 200	185

=== DVD ===
Chart (2009)	Peak position
Australian Music DVDs Chart	1
Austrian Music DVDs Chart	9
Belgian (Flanders) Music DVDs Chart	3
Dutch Music DVDs Chart	2
Irish Music DVDs Chart	5
Spanish Music DVDs Chart	15

Chart (2011)	Peak position
New Zealand Music DVDs Chart	1

== Certifications and sales ==
Region	Certification	Certified units/sales
United Kingdom (BPI)	Gold	100,000^{‡}
^{‡} Sales+streaming figures based on certification alone.
