= Hot August Night =

Live album by Neil Diamond
- Released: December 9, 1972
- Recorded: August 24, 1972
- Venues: Greek Theatre, Los Angeles, California
- Genre: Rock
- Length: 93:05
- Label: MCA
- Producer: Tom Catalano

Neil Diamond chronology
Moods (1972)	Hot August Night (1972)	Rainbow (1973)

Singles from Hot August Night
- 1. "Cherry, Cherry" Released: March 17, 1973

Hot August Night is a 1972 live double album by Neil Diamond. The album is a recording of a Diamond concert on August 24, 1972, one of ten sold-out concerts that Diamond performed that month at The Greek Theatre in Los Angeles.

Diamond later released three live "sequel" albums, Hot August Night II (1987), Hot August Night/NYC (2009), and Hot August Night III (2018), as well as the Love at the Greek live album, issued in 1977.

== Australian reception ==
Hot August Night is one of the biggest selling albums of all time in Australia, where it spent 29 weeks at number 1 on the album charts during 1973 and 1974. This makes it equal 5th for the most weeks at number 1, tying with Delta Goodrem's 2003 album Innocent Eyes.

Hot August Night was the number-one charting album in Australia for the 1970s, entering the Australian albums chart in late 1972 and still charting in the top 20 in 1976. It was the number 1 album of 1973 and the number 3 album of 1974. It re-entered the Australian top 10 in 1982, then had another chart run in 1991–92, peaking at number 19 on the February 16, March 1 and March 8, 1992 charts. During the 1991-92 chart-run it was listed on the chart as 14× Platinum. Based on album accreditation levels used until 1983, it equates to a 700,000 sales milestone. When the album re-entered the albums chart in 2014, it was listed as 10× Platinum. Based on accreditation levels since 1983, it also equates to a 700,000 sales milestone. However, because ARIA was only formed in 1983 and record companies have not reported complete record sales records to them, sales are an estimation only and in the case of 1970s albums like Hot August Night, the conservative estimates may fall short. In 1996, MCA Managing Director Paul Krige estimated that cumulative sales of Hot August Night in Australia have exceeded one million units.

== Critical reception ==
Professional ratings
Review scores
Source	Rating
AllMusic	4.5/5 stars
Creem	D+
The Rolling Stone Album Guide	4/5 stars

In a contemporary review for Rolling Stone, music critic Lester Bangs called Hot August Night a "fine presentation of the entire spectrum" of Diamond's work and praised its music as "great, pretentious, goofy pop" with a melodramatic, "hymn-like feeling".

In a retrospective review, Allmusic editor Stephen Thomas Erlewine called Hot August Night "the ultimate Neil Diamond record ... [which] shows Diamond the icon in full glory." Rob Sheffield, writing in The Rolling Stone Album Guide (2004), dubbed the album "the triumph of Neilness" and said that its music is slightly more "lax" than his studio recordings, but "festive".

== Track listing ==
=== 1972 vinyl edition ===
All tracks are written by Neil Diamond, except "I Think It's Going to Rain Today" on the 40th Anniversary Deluxe Edition which was written by Randy Newman.

Side one
No.	Title	Length
1.	"Prologue"	3:07
2.	"Crunchy Granola Suite"	4:26
3.	"Done Too Soon"	3:22
4.	"Dialogue"	1:22
5.	"Solitary Man"	3:14
6.	"Cherry, Cherry"	4:43
7.	"Sweet Caroline"	4:06

Side two
No.	Title	Length
1.	"Porcupine Pie"	1:51
2.	"You're So Sweet"	2:17
3.	"Red Red Wine"	3:56
4.	"Soggy Pretzels"	3:24
5.	"And the Grass Won't Pay No Mind"	4:39
6.	"Shilo"	3:35
7.	"Girl, You'll Be a Woman Soon"	2:48

Side three
No.	Title	Length
1.	"Play Me"	4:43
2.	"Canta Libre"	5:28
3.	"Morningside"	5:35
4.	"Song Sung Blue"	4:53
5.	"Cracklin' Rosie"	2:45

Side four
No.	Title	Length
1.	"Holly Holy"	6:18
2.	"I Am... I Said"	6:09
3.	"Soolaimon" / "Brother Love's Travelling Salvation Show"	9:36

=== 2000 compact disc release ===
Disc one
No.	Title	Length
1.	"Prologue"	3:07
2.	"Crunchy Granola Suite"	4:26
3.	"Done Too Soon"	3:22
4.	"Dialogue"	1:22
5.	"Solitary Man"	3:14
6.	"Cherry, Cherry"	4:43
7.	"Sweet Caroline"	4:06
8.	"Porcupine Pie"	1:51
9.	"You're So Sweet"	2:17
10.	"Red, Red Wine"	3:56
11.	"Soggy Pretzels"	3:24
12.	"And the Grass Won't Pay No Mind"	4:39
13.	"Shilo"	3:35
14.	"Girl, You'll Be a Woman Soon"	2:48
15.	"Walk On Water" (bonus track)	3:30
16.	"Kentucky Woman" (bonus track)	2:01
17.	"Stones" (bonus track)	3:59

Disc two
No.	Title	Length
1.	"Play Me"	4:43
2.	"Canta Libre"	5:28
3.	"Morningside"	5:35
4.	"Song Sung Blue"	4:53
5.	"Cracklin' Rosie"	2:45
6.	"Holly Holy"	6:18
7.	"I Am...I Said"	6:09
8.	"Soolaimon" / "Brother Love's Travelling Salvation Show"	9:36

=== 2012 40th anniversary deluxe edition ===
Disc one
No.	Title	Length
1.	"Prologue"	3:07
2.	"Crunchy Granola Suite"	4:26
3.	"Done Too Soon"	3:22
4.	"Dialogue"	1:22
5.	"Solitary Man"	3:14
6.	"Cherry, Cherry"	4:43
7.	"Sweet Caroline"	4:06
8.	"Porcupine Pie"	1:51
9.	"You're So Sweet"	2:17
10.	"Red, Red Wine"	3:56
11.	"Soggy Pretzels"	3:24
12.	"Gitchy Goomy" (new bonus track)	3:49
13.	"And the Grass Won't Pay No Mind"	4:39
14.	"I Think It's Going to Rain Today" (new bonus track)	4:12
15.	"Shilo"	3:35
16.	"Modern Day Version of Love" (new bonus track)	3:31
17.	"Girl, You'll Be a Woman Soon"	2:48
18.	"Walk On Water"	3:30
19.	"Kentucky Woman"	2:01
20.	"Stones"	3:59
21.	"Musician Intros" (new bonus track)	7:25

Disc two
No.	Title	Length
1.	"Play Me"	4:43
2.	"Canta Libre"	5:28
3.	"Morningside"	5:35
4.	"Song Sung Blue"	4:53
5.	"Cracklin' Rosie"	2:45
6.	"Holly Holy"	6:18
7.	"I Am... I Said"	6:09
8.	"Soolaimon" / "Brother Love's Travelling Salvation Show"	9:36

== Personnel ==
- Neil Diamond – vocals and guitar
- Richard Bennett – guitar
- Emory Gordy Jr. – guitar and vibraphone
- Jefferson Kewley – percussion
- Alan Lindgren – keyboards
- Danny Nicholson – guitar
- Reinie Press – Bass
- Linda Press - Background Vocals
- Dennis St. John – Drums
- Lee Holdridge – orchestra conductor
- String section – Sidney Sharp, Philip Candreva, Paulo Alencar, Baldassare Ferlazzo, Robert Lipsett, Haim Shtrum, Ron Folsom, Henry Ferber, Hyman Goodman, William Henderson, John DeVoogdt, Wilbert Nuttycombe, Jay Rosen, Walter Wiemeyer, Shari Zippert, Ralph Schaeffer, Tibor Zelig, Walter Rower, Salvatore Crimi, Richard Kaufman, David Turner (violins), Linn Subotnick, Philip Goldberg, Sven Reher, Myron Sandler, Marilyn Baker, Samuel Boghossian (violas), Jesse Ehrlich, Jerome Kessler, Raymond Kelley, Nathan Gershman, Alice Ober, Giacinto Nardulli (violoncelli), Timothy Barr, Jess Bourgeois, Don Bagley (bass violins)

== Charts ==
=== Weekly charts ===
Chart (1972–75)	Peak position
Australian Albums (Kent Music Report)	1
Canada Top Albums/CDs (RPM)	3
Dutch Albums (Album Top 100)	13
German Albums (Offizielle Top 100)	27
New Zealand Albums (RMNZ)	1
Norwegian Albums (VG-lista)	22
UK Albums (Official Charts)	21
US Billboard 200	5
Chart (1991–92)	Peak position
Australian Albums (ARIA)	19
New Zealand Albums (RMNZ)	29
Chart (2012–2014)	Peak position
Australian Albums (ARIA)	30
New Zealand Albums (RMNZ)	5
Dutch Albums (Album Top 100)	44

=== Year-end charts ===
Chart (1973)	Position
US Billboard 200	12
Chart (1974)	Position
Australian Albums (Kent Music Report)	3
Chart (1975)	Position
New Zealand Albums (RMNZ)	4
Chart (1976)	Position
New Zealand Albums (RMNZ)	17

== Certifications ==
Region	Certification	Certified units/sales
Australia (ARIA) original release	16× Platinum	800,000^{^}
Australia (ARIA) re-release	10× Platinum	760,000
Netherlands (NVPI)	Platinum	100,000^{^}
New Zealand (RMNZ)	2× Platinum	30,000^{^}
South Africa (RISA)	Gold	50,000
United Kingdom (BPI)	Gold	100,000^{^}
United States (RIAA)	2× Platinum	2,000,000^{^}
^{^} Shipments figures based on certification alone.
