= Hot August Night II =

Live album by Neil Diamond
- Released: November 10, 1987
- Recorded: August 1986
- Genre: Pop rock
- Length: 72:51
- Label: Columbia
- Producer: Val Garay

Neil Diamond chronology
Headed for the Future (1986)	Hot August Night II (1987)	The Best Years of Our Lives (1988)

Hot August Night II is a live album by Neil Diamond. This is a follow-up to his 1972 double album Hot August Night, which is also a live album. This album is certified Platinum by the RIAA.

== Critical reception ==
Professional ratings
Review scores
Source	Rating
AllMusic	3/5 stars
New Musical Express	4/10

Stephen Thomas Erlewine of AllMusic writes, "Running through his biggest hits, Diamond turns in a flashy, showy performance."

== Track listing ==
All tracks are written by Neil Diamond, unless otherwise noted.

No.	Title	Writer(s)	Length
1.	"Song of the Whales (Fanfare)"	Alan Lindgren	1:55
2.	"Headed for the Future"	Neil Diamond; Tom Hensley; Alan Lindgren	4:10
3.	"September Morn"	Neil Diamond; Gilbert Bécaud	4:03
4.	"Thank the Lord for the Night Time"		3:23
5.	"Cherry, Cherry"		3:14
6.	"Sweet Caroline"		3:50
7.	"Hello Again"	Neil Diamond; Alan Lindgren	3:33
8.	"Love on the Rocks"	Neil Diamond; Gilbert Bécaud	3:13
9.	"America"		3:56
10.	"Forever in Blue Jeans"	Neil Diamond; Richard Bennett	3:29
11.	"You Don't Bring Me Flowers"	Neil Diamond; Alan Bergman; Marilyn Bergman	4:42
12.	"I Dreamed a Dream"	Alain Boublil; Claude-Michel Schönberg; Herbert Kretzmer; Jean-Marc Natel	4:37
13.	"Back in L.A."		2:25
14.	"Song Sung Blue"		2:52
15.	"Cracklin' Rosie"		2:55
16.	"I Am...I Said"		5:08
17.	"Holly Holy"		4:37
18.	"Soolaimon"		1:20
19.	"Brother Love's Travelling Salvation Show"		5:35
20.	"Heartlight"	Neil Diamond; Burt Bacharach; Carole Bayer Sager	3:54
Total length:			72:51

== Musicians ==
The Neil Diamond Band

- Richard Bennett – Acoustic & Electric Guitar
- Alan Lindgren – Synthesizer & Piano
- King Errisson – Percussion
- Reinie Press – Bass
- Tom Hensley – Piano & Keyboards
- Doug Rhone – Acoustic & Electric Guitar
- Vince Charles – Percussion
- Ron Tutt – Drums
- Background Vocals – Doug Rhone, Linda Press, Ron Tutt

Additional Strings

- Concertmaster – Assa Drori
- Conductor – Alan Lindgren
- Violin – Assa Drori, Bill Hybell, Bob Sanov, Clayton Haslop, Donald Palmer, Meg Zivahi, Reg Hill, Shari Zippert
- Viola – Lenny Sachs, Margo MacLaine
- Cello – Tony Cooke, Ray Kelley
- Bass – Mickey Nadel

== Production ==
- Producer – Val Garay
- Mastered by Stephen Marcussen
- Recording Engineers – Allen Sides, Val Garay
- Arranged by Alan Lindgren
- Art Direction and Design – David Kirschner
- Additional Design – Jan Weinberg, Beverly Lazor-Bahr
- Mixed by Val Garay
- Assistant Engineers – Bob Levy, Bob Loftus
- Photography by Harrison Funk
- Album Production Coordinator – Sam Cole
- Production Assistants – Ned Brown, Barry Cardinael, Larry Williams, Alison Zanetos

== Concert production staff ==
- Concert Production Producer – Patrick Stansfield
- Tour Manager – Jerry Murphey
- Stage Manager & Technical Director – Doug Pope
- Lighting Director – Marilyn Lowey

Track information and credits adapted from the album's liner notes.

== Charts ==
Chart (1988)	Peak position
US Billboard 200	59

== Certifications ==
Region	Certification	Certified units/sales
United States (RIAA)	Platinum	1,000,000^{^}
^{^} Shipments figures based on certification alone.
