= Rainbow (Neil Diamond album) =

Compilation album by Neil Diamond
- Released: 1973
- Recorded: 1969–1971
- Genre: Pop
- Length: 39:38
- Label: MCA
- Producer: Tom Catalano

Neil Diamond chronology
Hot August Night (1972)	Rainbow (1973)	Jonathan Livingston Seagull (1973)

Re-issue cover

Professional ratings
Review scores
Source	Rating
Allmusic	3/5 stars

Rainbow is a compilation album of covers recorded by Neil Diamond from 1969 to 1971. These songs were composed by some of the best-known singer-songwriters of the time.

The cover for Rainbow was originally an illustration by Craig Nelson, but was later replaced with photography by Tom Bert. This same photograph would later be re-used for the cover of Play Me: The Complete Uni Studio Recordings...Plus!

== Track listing ==
Side one
No.	Title	Writer(s)	Original Album	Length
1.	"Everybody's Talkin'"	Fred Neil	Touching You, Touching Me	2:46
2.	"Both Sides Now"	Joni Mitchell	Touching You, Touching Me	3:30
3.	"Husbands and Wives"	Roger Miller	Stones	3:54
4.	"Chelsea Morning"	Joni Mitchell	Stones	2:32
5.	"Until It's Time for You to Go"	Buffy Sainte-Marie	Touching You, Touching Me	3:29
6.	"The Last Thing on My Mind"	Tom Paxton	Stones	3:31

Side two
No.	Title	Writer(s)	Original Album	Length
1.	"Suzanne"	Leonard Cohen	Stones	4:41
2.	"Mr. Bojangles"	Jerry Jeff Walker	Touching You, Touching Me	4:53
3.	"If You Go Away"	Jaques Brel, Rod McKuen	Stones	3:47
4.	"I Think It's Gonna Rain Today"	Randy Newman	Stones	2:36
5.	"He Ain't Heavy, He's My Brother"	Bob Russell, Bobby Scott	Tap Root Manuscript	3:59
