= Love at the Greek =

Live album by Neil Diamond
- Released: February 4, 1977
- Recorded: September 13, 1976
- Genre: Rock
- Length: 67:03 (CD)
- Label: Columbia
- Producer: Robbie Robertson

Neil Diamond chronology
And the Singer Sings His Song (1976)	Love at the Greek (1977)	I'm Glad You're Here with Me Tonight (1977)

Professional ratings
Review scores
Source	Rating
AllMusic	2/5 stars

Love at the Greek is a live double album by Neil Diamond which was released in 1977. It was Diamond's second live album recorded from a concert at the Greek Theater in Los Angeles, and Neil's second album produced by Robbie Robertson of The Band (the first being 1976's Beautiful Noise). Helen Reddy and Henry Winkler have special appearances on the track “Song Sung Blue”.

This album was released in conjunction with a television special broadcast of the concert footage that aired in the United States on February 21, 1977. The television special, broadcast on NBC (and simulcast on FM stations nationwide) was also titled Love at the Greek. The special was nominated for four Emmy Awards. The television special was later released to video on VHS.

== Track listing ==
=== LP release ===
==== Side 1 ====
1. "Streetlife" – 2:00
2. "Kentucky Woman" – 1:57
3. "Sweet Caroline" – 3:59
4. "The Last Picasso" – 4:29
5. "Longfellow Serenade" – 4:14

==== Side 2 ====
1. "Beautiful Noise" – 3:11
2. "Lady Oh" – 4:04
3. "Stargazer" – 2:37
4. "If You Know What I Mean" – 4:11
5. "Surviving the Life" – 4:49

==== Side 3 ====
1. "Glory Road" – 3:37
2. "Song Sung Blue" – 4:09
3. "Holly Holy" – 4:38
4. "Brother Love's Travelling Salvation Show" – 5:31

==== Side 4 ====
1. "Jonathan Livingston Seagull" – 15:43
  - "Be"
  - "Dear Father"
  - "Lonely Looking Sky"
  - "Sanctus"
  - "Skybird"
  - "Be (Encore)"
2. "I've Been This Way Before" – 4:56

=== CD release ===
1. "Introduction" – 1:41
2. "Street Life" – 2:00
3. "Kentucky Woman" – 1:57
4. "Sweet Caroline" – 3:59
5. "Beautiful Noise" – 3:11
6. "Lady Oh" – 4:04
7. "Stargazer" – 2:37
8. "If You Know What I Mean" – 4:11
9. "Surviving the Life" – 4:49
10. "Glory Road" – 3:37
11. "Song Sung Blue" – 4:09
12. "Holly Holy" – 4:38
13. "Brother Love's Travelling Salvation Show" – 5:31
14. "Jonathan Livingston Seagull" – 15:43
  - "Be"
  - "Dear Father"
  - "Lonely Looking Sky"
  - "Sanctus"
  - "Skybird"
  - "Be (Encore)"
15. "I've Been This Way Before" – 4:56

== Personnel ==
- Reinie Press – bass guitar
- Dennis St. John – drums
- Doug Rhone – guitar
- Richard Bennett – guitar
- Alan Lindgren – keyboards
- Tom Hensley – keyboards
- King Errison – percussion
- Linda Press – vocals
- Neil Diamond – vocals, guitar

== Charts ==
=== Weekly charts ===
Chart (1977–78)	Peak position
Australian Albums (Kent Music Report)	7
Austrian Albums (Ö3 Austria)	6
Canada Top Albums/CDs (RPM)	8
Dutch Albums (Album Top 100)	1
German Albums (Offizielle Top 100)	16
Japanese Albums (Oricon)	81
New Zealand Albums (RMNZ)	1
UK Albums (Official Charts)	3
US Billboard 200	8

=== Year-end charts ===
Chart (1977)	Position
Austrian Albums (Ö3 Austria)	5
Canada Top Albums/CDs (RPM)	55
Dutch Albums (Album Top 100)	5
German Albums (Offizielle Top 100)	39
New Zealand Albums (RMNZ)	21
UK Albums (OCC)	29

== Certifications ==
Region	Certification	Certified units/sales
Canada (Music Canada)	Platinum	100,000^{^}
United Kingdom (BPI)	Platinum	300,000^{^}
United States (RIAA)	2× Platinum	2,000,000^{^}
^{^} Shipments figures based on certification alone.
