= Moods (Neil Diamond album) =

Studio album by Neil Diamond
- Released: July 1972
- Recorded: 1971–1972
- Genre: Pop
- Length: 33:34
- Label: Uni
- Producers: Tom Catalano, Neil Diamond

Neil Diamond chronology
Stones (1971)	Moods (1972)	Hot August Night (1972)

Singles from Moods
- 1. "Song Sung Blue" Released: May 1972; 2. "Play Me" Released: August 1972; 3. "Walk On Water" Released: October 1972

Professional ratings
Review scores
Source	Rating
AllMusic	3/5 stars

Moods is the eighth studio album by Neil Diamond, released by Uni Records in 1972. It contained the second of his No.1 songs, "Song Sung Blue", and was something of a follow-up in style to the highly experimental Tap Root Manuscript. The album entered Billboard on July 15, where it reached No. 5 in early September.

Billboard praised Moods highly, saying it contained "brilliant, diversified material." This album, and its follow-up live album Hot August Night, are generally acknowledged to be the two most important recording projects of Diamond's career in terms of defining his signature sound for the future. Within the music industry and among music professionals, this is considered one of Diamond's better and more creative recordings. It received a Grammy Award nomination for Album of the Year for 1972. "Song Sung Blue" was nominated for Grammy Awards for Record of the Year and Song of the Year. Lee Holdridge was the arranger and conductor of the orchestra.

According to Cash Box, the third single from the album, "Walk on Water," sounds a little like Cat Stevens. Record World called it "one of [Diamond's] most interesting records since 'Soolaimón.'"

== Track listing ==
All tracks written by Neil Diamond.

Side one
No.	Title	Length
1.	"Song Sung Blue"	3:15
2.	"Porcupine Pie"	2:04
3.	"High Rolling Man"	2:35
4.	"Canta Libre"	4:47
5.	"Captain Sunshine"	3:25

Side two
No.	Title	Length
1.	"Play Me"	3:49
2.	"Gitchy Goomy"	3:53
3.	"Walk on Water"	3:04
4.	"Theme"	1:38
5.	"Prelude in E Major"	0:38
6.	"Morningside"	4:24

== Charts ==
=== Weekly charts ===
Chart (1972)	Peak position
Australian Albums (Kent Music Report)	4
Canada Top Albums/CDs (RPM)	4
Dutch Albums (Album Top 100)	3
German Albums (Offizielle Top 100)	9
Norwegian Albums (VG-lista)	5
UK Albums (Official Charts)	7
US Billboard 200	5

=== Year-end charts ===
Chart (1972)	Position
German Albums (Offizielle Top 100)	50

== Certifications ==
Region	Certification	Certified units/sales
United States (RIAA)	Platinum	1,000,000^{^}
^{^} Shipments figures based on certification alone.
