= And the Singer Sings His Song =

Compilation album by Neil Diamond
- Released: 1976
- Length: 38:42
- Label: MCA
- Producer: Tom Catalano

Neil Diamond chronology
Beautiful Noise (1976)	And the Singer Sings His Song (1976)	Love at the Greek (1977)

Professional ratings
Review scores
Source	Rating
Allmusic	4/5 stars

And the Singer Sings His Song is a compilation album by Neil Diamond released by MCA Records in 1976. It peaked at number 102 on the Billboard 200 chart. Music critic Shawn M. Haney referred to the album as "a somewhat entertaining collection of Neil Diamond's lesser-known melodies" and that "the songs are charming, romantic, and easy to dance to. Perfect for a getaway excursion from reality and off to your favorite beached island".

== Track listing ==
All tracks written by Neil Diamond.

Side one
No.	Title	Length
1.	"Captain Sunshine"	3:22
2.	"Free Life"	3:11
3.	"Hurtin' You Don't Come Easy"	2:32
4.	"Coldwater Morning"	3:20
5.	"Walk on Water"	3:04
6.	"Stones"	3:02

Side two
No.	Title	Length
1.	"And the Grass Won't Pay No Mind"	3:33
2.	"If I Never Knew Your Name"	3:17
3.	"Merry-Go-Round"	3:14
4.	"Juliet"	2:51
5.	"Brooklyn Roads"	3:39
6.	"And the Singer Sings His Song"	3:37
