= Jonathan Livingston Seagull (soundtrack) =

Soundtrack album by Neil Diamond
- Released: October 19, 1973
- Recorded: 1973
- Genre: Film soundtrack
- Length: 43:29
- Label: Columbia
- Producer: Tom Catalano

Neil Diamond chronology
Rainbow (1972)	Jonathan Livingston Seagull (1973)	His 12 Greatest Hits (1974)

Professional ratings
Review scores
Source	Rating
AllMusic	3.5/5 stars
Rolling Stone	(mixed)

Jonathan Livingston Seagull is a soundtrack album by American singer-songwriter Neil Diamond, released in 1973 by Columbia Records. Produced by Tom Catalano, it is the soundtrack to the 1973 film of the same name. The album marked Diamond's return to Columbia and grossed more than the film itself. It won the 1974 Grammy for Best Original Score Written for a Motion Picture or a Television Special.

Diamond often included a Jonathan Livingston Seagull suite in his live performances, as he did in his 1976 Love at the Greek concert—comprising "Be", "Dear Father", "Lonely Looking Sky", "Sanctus", "Skybird" and "Be (Encore)"—and his show in Las Vegas that same year. A studio version of the suite—comprising "Prologue", "Lonely Looking Sky", "Skybird", "Dear Father (Rebuked)" and "Be"—was presented on Diamond's 1996 box set In My Lifetime.

== Reception ==
Jonathan Livingston Seagull and Diamond's subsequent album Serenade (1974) have earned a combined 27 gold discs in Australia. As of September 1976, the soundtrack was a bigger financial success than the film, grossing 12 million dollars, while the film itself had grossed 2 million.

Irvine Herald reviewer Willie Freckleton observed that "Be" was "classical Diamond singing a very powerful ballad." In a retrospective review for AllMusic, Shawn M. Haney found the album to be "compelling and rich in texture and melody" and praised Catalano's direction, Holdridge's orchestral arrangements and Diamond's occasional vocals, concluding that the album "fits the piece of the puzzle the motion picture needed so perfectly."

== Track listing ==
All tracks are written by Neil Diamond.

Side one
No.	Title	Liner notes	Length
1.	"Prologue"	And here begins our story – the sky, the sea, the flock.	3:19
2.	"Be"	Introduction of Jonathan – his flight and fall.	6:28
3.	"Flight of the Gull"	Jonathan is carried to the heights of ambition, and to near catastrophe.	2:23
4.	"Dear Father"	Battered, and near death, Jonathan asks for reasons.	5:12
5.	"Skybird"	Returning home to show what he has learned, his acrobatics only serve to anger the flock elders. He is put on trial, and forever…outcast.	1:12
6.	"Lonely Looking Sky"	Alone and adrift.	3:12

Side two
No.	Title	Liner notes	Length
1.	"The Odyssey: Be/Lonely Looking Sky/Dear Father"	And so begins a journey, an odyssey, a test of the spirit.	9:28
2.	"Anthem"	"Transcend, purify, glorious."	3:03
3.	"Be"	Jonathan returns to teach the flock.	1:06
4.	"Skybird"	The lesson	2:18
5.	"Dear Father"	Rebuked again by the elders, Jonathan attempts to rally the flock.	1:14
6.	"Be"	Recapitulation and farewell to Fletcher	3:26

== Personnel ==
Credits adapted from LP liner notes.

Musicians

- Paulo Alencar
- Phil Azelton
- Israel Baker
- Marilyn H. Baker
- Paul Beaver
- Myer Bello
- Arnold Belnick
- Richard Bennett
- Dixie Blackstone
- Hal Blaine
- Harry Bluestone
- Samuel Boghossian
- Hoyt Bohannon
- Owen Wilson Brady
- Larry E. Carlton
- Donald Christlieb
- Gene Cipriano
- David Cohen
- Gary L. Coleman
- Chase Craig
- William Criss
- Rollice Dale
- Isabelle Dashkoff
- Vincent N. DeRosa
- Assa Drori
- Robert Dubow
- David A. Duke
- Jesse Ehrlich
- John Ellis
- Gene P. Estes
- Victor S. Feldman
- Henry Ferber
- Ronald P. Folsom
- Norman Forrest
- James Getzoff
- Caesar Giovannini
- Philip Goldberg
- Harris Goldman
- Emory L. Gordy Jr.
- Ralph E. Grierson
- Allan Harshman
- William Henderson
- Thomas R. Hensley
- Arthur Hoberman
- Claire Hodgkins
- Lee Holdridge
- Luella Howard
- Selene Hurford
- Harry Hyams
- Jules Jacob
- John T. Johnson
- Yukiko Kanei
- George Kast
- Pearl Kaufman
- Richard S. Kaufman
- Raymond J. Kelley
- Jerome A. Kessler
- Louis Kievman
- Lou Klass
- Robert Konrad
- Jacob Krachmalnick
- Raphael Kramer
- Bernard Kundell
- William Kurasch
- Carl LaMagna
- Michael Lang
- Diana Lee
- Gayle Levant
- Marvin Limonick
- Abe Luboff
- Arthur Maebe
- Leonard Malarsky
- Jack Marsh
- Lew McCreary
- Ida Sue McCune
- Peter A. Mercurio
- Joseph Mondragon
- Milton E. Nadel
- Wilbert Nuttycombe
- Michael S. Omartian
- Joe Osborn
- Robert Ostrowsky
- William B. Peterson
- Hugo Raimondi
- Sven Reher
- Joseph Reilich
- David B. Roberts
- Nathan Ross
- Johnny Rotella
- Sheldon Sanov
- Ralph Schaeffer
- Gordon Schoneberg
- David Schwartz
- Sidney Sharp
- Stan Sheldone
- Thomas N. Shepard
- Ray Siegel
- Henry Sigismonti
- Louis Singer
- Arthur C. Smith
- Clark E. Spangler
- Julian Spear
- Sally Stevens
- Robert K. Stone
- Anthony Terran
- Joseph Di Tullio
- John de Voogdt
- Jackie Ward
- Andra Willis
- Tibor Zelig

Bob Mitchell's Singing Boys

- Mark Albert
- Kirk E. Alley
- Timothy John Butala
- Christopher J. Cartwright
- Michael DeWayne Clark
- Dale A. Cohen
- John Robert Coniglio
- Sean Patrick English
- Clement Shuji Hanami
- Jeffrey M. Kennedy
- Mathew James Leum
- Michael Richard Leum
- Bruce Douglas MacLeod
- Martin Shunji Nomura
- Brian Tatsuo Okamoto
- Bradford S. Ralston
- Jaime Rodriguez
- Timothy J. Schmidt
- Erik Stanton Simmons
- Tracy L. Thielen
- Eric M. Williams
- Sherman A. Williams III
- Paul Watson Wims, Jr.
- Ronald Trimby Young

Technical

- Tom Catalano – producer, musical director
- Lee Holdridge – orchestral arranger, conductor
- Armin Steiner – engineer
- Ed Caraeff – art direction, photography
- David Larkham – art direction, package design (Tepee Graphics)
- Michael Ross – art direction, package design (Tepee Graphics)
- Ron Coro – executive art director
- Tom Burke – inside cover portrait photo
- Bob Mitchell – director; Bob Mitchell's Singing Boys
- Burbank staff:
  - Andy MacDonald – recorder
  - Bill Gernand – recorder
  - "Doc" Siegel – mixer

== Charts ==
=== Weekly charts ===
Chart (1973–77)	Peak position
Australian Albums (Kent Music Report)	1
Austrian Albums (Ö3 Austria)	7
Canada Top Albums/CDs (RPM)	3
Dutch Albums (Album Top 100)	8
German Albums (Offizielle Top 100)	44
Japanese Albums (Oricon)	45
New Zealand Albums (RMNZ)	3
Spanish Albums (El Musical)	8
UK Albums (Official Charts)	35
US Billboard 200	2
Chart (2021)	Peak position
Belgian Albums (Ultratop Flanders)	154

=== Year-end charts ===
Chart (1974)	Position
Australian Albums (Kent Music Report)	8
Canada Top Albums/CDs (RPM)	61
Chart (1975)	Position
Dutch Albums (Album Top 100)	30
New Zealand Albums (RMNZ)	14

=== Sales and certifications ===
Region	Certification	Certified units/sales
Australia (ARIA)	Gold	20,000^{^}
Belgium	—	200,000
Canada (Music Canada)	2× Platinum	200,000^{^}
France (SNEP)	Platinum	300,000^{*}
Germany (BVMI)	Gold	250,000^{^}
Hong Kong (IFPI Hong Kong)	Gold	10,000^{*}
Netherlands (NVPI)	Gold	50,000^{^}
New Zealand (RMNZ)	Gold	77,000
United Kingdom (BPI)	Gold	100,000^{^}
United States (RIAA)	2× Platinum	2,000,000^{^}
^{*} Sales figures based on certification alone.^{^} Shipments figures based on certification alone.
