= 12 Greatest Hits, Vol. II =

Greatest hits album by Neil Diamond
- Released: 1982
- Recorded: 1973–1981
- Length: 45:36
- Label: Columbia

Professional ratings
Review scores
Source	Rating
AllMusic	4.5/5 stars

12 Greatest Hits, Vol. II is a compilation album by American singer-songwriter Neil Diamond, released in 1982 by Columbia Records. It is a follow-up to His 12 Greatest Hits (1974, MCA) and includes songs spanning 1973–1981.

== Track listing ==
All tracks are written by Neil Diamond, unless otherwise noted.

Side 1
No.	Title	Writer(s)	Length
1.	"Beautiful Noise"		3:25
2.	"Hello Again"	Neil Diamond; Alan Lindgren	4:07
3.	"Forever in Blue Jeans"	Neil Diamond; Richard Bennett	3:23
4.	"September Morn"	Neil Diamond; Gilbert Bécaud	3:52
5.	"Desirée"		3:19
6.	"You Don't Bring Me Flowers" (duet with Barbra Streisand)		3:25

Side 2
No.	Title	Writer(s)	Length
1.	"America"		4:18
2.	"Be"		5:44
3.	"Longfellow Serenade"		3:52
4.	"If You Know What I Mean"		3:41
5.	"Yesterday's Songs"		2:50
6.	"Love on the Rocks"	Neil Diamond; Gilbert Bécaud	3:40

== Charts ==
Chart (1982)	Peak position
US Billboard 200	48

== Certifications ==
Region	Certification	Certified units/sales
United States (RIAA)	3× Platinum	3,000,000^{^}
^{^} Shipments figures based on certification alone.
