= A Cherry Cherry Christmas =

Studio album by Neil Diamond
- Released: October 13, 2009
- Recorded: 1992 (4, 6, 8–9); 1994 (2–3, 7, 10–11); 2009 (1, 5, 12–14)
- Studio: Arch Angel Studios and Ashbaland Studios (Los Angeles, California); Warner Bros. Studios/Eastwood Scoring Stage (Burbank, California)
- Genre: Christmas
- Length: 45:10
- Label: American, Columbia
- Producer: Neil Diamond; Peter Asher; DJ Ashba

Neil Diamond chronology
| Hot August Night/NYC (2009) | A Cherry Cherry Christmas (2009) | Dreams (2010) |

Professional ratings
Review scores
| Source | Rating |
|---|---|
| AllMusic | 2.5/5 stars |

A Cherry Cherry Christmas is the third Christmas album and also the twenty-eighth studio album by singer-songwriter Neil Diamond. The album contains five new tracks, and nine tracks compiled from his previous two Christmas albums. It was released on October 13, 2009. The title track is a new Christmas carol written by Diamond.

The album includes a cover of Adam Sandler's "The Chanukah Song", which Diamond recorded because, he explained, "There are so many beautiful Christmas songs around and so few Hanukkah songs."

== Track listing ==
| No. | Title | Writer(s) | Original album | Length |
|---|---|---|---|---|
| 1. | "Cherry Cherry Christmas" | Neil Diamond | new | 3:31 |
| 2. | "Sleigh Ride" | Leroy Anderson, Mitchell Parish | The Christmas Album, Volume II | 2:44 |
| 3. | "Have Yourself a Merry Little Christmas" | Hugh Martin, Ralph Blane | The Christmas Album, Volume II | 4:46 |
| 4. | "White Christmas" | Irving Berlin | The Christmas Album | 3:23 |
| 5. | "Christmas Dream" | Neil Diamond | new | 5:50 |
| 6. | "The Christmas Song" | Mel Tormé, Bob Wells | The Christmas Album | 3:34 |
| 7. | "Deck the Halls/We Wish You a Merry Christmas" | Traditional | The Christmas Album, Volume II | 1:44 |
| 8. | "Jingle Bell Rock" | Joe Beale, Jim Boothe | The Christmas Album | 1:53 |
| 9. | "You Make It Feel Like Christmas" | Neil Diamond | The Christmas Album | 3:39 |
| 10. | "Winter Wonderland" | Felix Bernard, Richard B. Smith | The Christmas Album, Volume II | 2:46 |
| 11. | "Joy to the World" | Isaac Watts, Lowell Mason | The Christmas Album, Volume II | 2:42 |
| 12. | "Amazing Grace" | John Newton | new | 3:45 |
| 13. | "Meditations on a Winter Night (instrumental)" | DJ Ashba | new | 0:55 |
| 14. | "The Chanukah Song" | Adam Sandler | new | 3:54 |

== Personnel ==
Tracks 1, 5 & 12–14

- Neil Diamond – vocals
- Alan Lindgren – acoustic piano (1, 12), orchestra arrangements and conductor (1, 12)
- DJ Ashba – all instruments (14)
- Hadley Hockensmith – guitars (1)
- Reinie Press – bass (1, 12)
- Don Markese – saxophone (1), penny whistle (12)
- Josef Powell, Julia Waters, Maxine Waters and Oren Waters – group vocals (12)

=== Production ===
- Arch Angel Music – compilation production
- Neil Diamond – producer (1, 12)
- Peter Asher – producer (2–4, 6–11)
- DJ Ashba – producer (5, 13, 14), mixing (5, 14)
- Bernie Becker – recording (1, 12), mixing (1, 12), mastering at Bernie Becker Mastering (Pasadena, California)
- Marti Fredrickson – mixing (5, 14)
- Dale Becker – mastering assistant
- Sam Cole – production coordinator
- Glen Nakasako – art direction, design
- Jesse Diamond, Mark Seliger and Jason Ware – photography
- Irving Azoff and Kate McNeil – management

== Promotion ==
A music video ecard was also released for the song "The Chanukah Song".

== Charts ==
| Chart (2009) | Peak position |
|---|---|
| US Top Holiday Albums (Billboard) | 6 |
| US Billboard 200 | 60 |
