= The Best Years of Our Lives (Neil Diamond album) =

Studio album by Neil Diamond
- Released: 13 December 1988
- Studios: Chartmaker Studios (Los Angeles, California); Lion Share Studios (Los Angeles); The Village Recorder (Los Angeles); A&M Studios (Hollywood, California); Ocean Way Recording (Hollywood); OmniSound Studios (Nashville, Tennessee); Seacost Sound (Victoria, British Columbia)
- Genre: Adult contemporary
- Length: 44:44
- Label: Columbia
- Producer: David Foster

Neil Diamond chronology
Hot August Night II (1987)	The Best Years of Our Lives (1988)	Lovescape (1991)

Professional ratings
Review scores
Source	Rating
Allmusic	3/5 stars

The Best Years of Our Lives is the eighteenth studio album by Neil Diamond. It was released by Columbia Records in 1988 and reached number 46 on the Billboard 200 chart, number 42 on the UK album chart, and number 92 on the Australian chart. The album was certified gold by the RIAA on February 16, 1989. In his review of The Best Years of Our Lives music critic Bryan Buss referred to it as "a strong entry in Diamond's oeuvre" and as "an album that is romantic and sentimental without being manipulative".

Three singles from the album, the title track, "This Time", and "Baby Can I Hold You" reached numbers 7, 9, and 28, respectively on Billboard's Adult Contemporary chart. "This Time" also reached #17 on the Irish Singles Chart. Cash Box said of the title track that it was "not a terribly inspired tune, but served up with predictable skill by Mr. D."

== Track listing ==
No.	Title	Writer(s)	Length
1.	"The Best Years of Our Lives"	Neil Diamond	4:00
2.	"Hard Times for Lovers"	Neil Diamond	4:25
3.	"This Time"	Neil Diamond, David Foster, Jeremy Lubbock	3:57
4.	"Everything's Gonna Be Fine"	Neil Diamond, Weldon Dean Parks	3:59
5.	"Hooked on the Memory of You"	Neil Diamond	3:53
6.	"Take Care of Me"	Neil Diamond, David Foster	3:39
7.	"Baby Can I Hold You"	Tracy Chapman	3:55
8.	"Carmelita's Eyes"	Neil Diamond, David Foster	4:05
9.	"Courtin' Disaster"	Neil Diamond, David Foster	4:32
10.	"If I Couldn't See You Again"	Neil Diamond	4:02
11.	"Long Hard Climb"	Neil Diamond, Tom Hensley, Alan Lindgren	4:42

== Personnel ==
- Neil Diamond – lead vocals
- Michael Boddicker – keyboards
- Robbie Buchanan – keyboards
- David Foster – keyboards, horn arrangements
- Tom Hensley – keyboards
- Alan Lindgren – keyboards
- Michael Omartian – keyboards
- David Paich – keyboards
- Rick Bowen – synthesizer programming
- Rhett Lawrence – synthesizer programming
- Kevin Maloney – synthesizer programming
- Richard Bennett – acoustic guitars
- Michael Landau – electric guitars
- Steve Lukather – electric guitars
- Dean Parks – acoustic guitars, electric guitars
- Mike Brignardello – bass
- Reinie Press – bass
- Tris Imboden – drums
- Paul Leim – drums
- Carlos Vega – drums
- Dan Higgins – horns
- Larry Williams – horns
- Bill Reichenbach Jr. – horns
- Gary Grant – horns
- Jerry Hey – horns, horn arrangements
- Jeremy Lubbock – string arrangements
- Bill Champlin – backing vocals
- Tamara Champlin – backing vocals
- Renée Geyer – backing vocals
- Richard Page – backing vocals

== Production ==
- David Foster – producer, arrangements
- Jeffrey "Woody" Woodruff – chief recording engineer
- Humberto Gatica – mixing, additional recording
- Jeff Balding – additional recording
- David Reitzas – additional recording, assistant engineer
- Jesse Kanner – assistant engineer
- Ray Pyle – assistant engineer
- Mauricio Guerrero – mix assistant
- Laura Livingston – mix assistant
- George Marino – mastering at Sterling Sound (New York City, New York)
- Sam Cole – production coordinator
- Chris Earthy – production coordinator
- Ned Brown – production assistant
- Barry Cardinale – production assistant
- Larry E. Williams – production assistant
- Alison Zanetos – production assistant
- David Kirschner – art direction, design
- Beverley Lazor-Bahr – additional design
- Matthew Rolston – photography

== Charts ==
Chart (1988–1989)	Peak position
Australian Albums (Kent Music Report)	92
Dutch Albums (Album Top 100)	43
UK Albums (Official Charts)	42
US Billboard 200	46

== Certifications ==
Region	Certification	Certified units/sales
United States (RIAA)	Gold	500,000^{^}
^{^} Shipments figures based on certification alone.
