= Crunchy Granola Suite =

- Dutch picture sleeve

Single by Neil Diamond

from the album Stones
- A-side: "Stones"
- Released: October 7, 1971
- Recorded: 1971
- Genre: Pop rock
- Length: 3:15
- Label: UNI
- Songwriter: Neil Diamond
- Producer: Tom Catalano

Neil Diamond singles chronology
"I'm a Believer" (1971)	"Crunchy Granola Suite" (1971)	"Song Sung Blue" (1972)

"Crunchy Granola Suite" is a pop rock song written and recorded in 1971 by Neil Diamond.

== Release ==
The song was released on the album Stones and included as a B-side on the single for the album's title track.

The song appears on a number of Diamond's albums, including the live album Hot August Night, which opens with a combination of the instrumental "The Prologue" and "Crunchy Granola Suite".

== Lyrical interpretation ==
James Perone writes, "The song describes how a man who previously suffered through all sorts of hang-ups has found solace with his newfound adherence to the stereotypical California, macrobiotic, granola, health food lifestyle".

The song was inspired by the healthy lifestyle Diamond was exposed to after moving to Los Angeles. In the liner notes to his 1996 compilation album In My Lifetime Diamond says he was "newly transported to California and was impressed by the health food consciousness there. I actually thought Crunchy Granola Suite might change people's eating habits!"

== Critical reception and chart success ==
The single "Stones" (for which "Crunchy Granola Suite" was the B-side) charted at No. 14 on the Billboard Hot 100 in the US and No. 24 on the Australian charts.

The track "Prologue / Crunchy Granola Suite" was nominated for the 1973 Grammy Award for Best Instrumental Arrangement (for conductor Lee Holdridge).

Reviewing Hot August Night in 1973, Robert Christgau said "Crunchy Granola Suite"'s opening guitar riff made it "obvious this man is some sort of genius rock entertainer". David Wild in his book He Is-- I Say: How I Learned to Stop Worrying and Love Neil Diamond, said, "he managed to write the coolest song ever written about granola or any other breakfast food made of rolled oats, nuts and honey".

== Cover versions ==
Easy listening artist Percy Faith released a version in 1973 on his album Corazon which was released as a single reaching No.16 on the Billboard Easy Listening chart in the USA.

The song was used in the Tony Award winning musical revue Dancin', directed and choreographed by Bob Fosse.
