= Done Too Soon =

Single by Neil Diamond

from the album Tap Root Manuscript
- A-side: "I Am...I Said"
- Released: March 15, 1971
- Genre: Pop rock
- Length: 2:45
- Label: Uni
- Songwriter: Neil Diamond
- Producer: Tom Catalano

"Done Too Soon" is a song written, composed and performed by Neil Diamond, and released on his 1970 album Tap Root Manuscript. Listed as track 4 on side one of the album, it was jointly arranged by Marty Paich and Lee Holdridge and jointly produced by Diamond and Tom Catalano.

== Content ==
"Done Too Soon" is a song of mortality that is divided, stylistically, into two sections: a fast-paced first part and a slower, more introspective second part. Cash Box described the song by saying that "the up-tempo thrust that opens the track gives way to a commentary, inspirational close."

=== Lyrics ===
The lyrics of "Done Too Soon" drop the following names, in order, in its fast-paced first part:

1. Jesus Christ, central figure of Christianity
2. Fanny Brice, American stage, screen, and radio comedian, subject of Funny Girl
3. Wolfgang Amadeus Mozart, Austrian composer
4. Humphrey Bogart, American actor
5. Genghis Khan, Mongolian military-political conqueror-adventurer
6. H. G. Wells, British Victorian-era science-fiction writer
7. Ho Chi Minh, Vietnamese communist leader
8. Gunga Din, title character of the Rudyard Kipling poem
9. Henry Luce, American publisher, founder of Time magazine
10. John Wilkes Booth, American actor, assassin of Abraham Lincoln
11. Alexander King, American writer and early television personality
12. Alexander Graham Bell, inventor of the telephone
13. Ramakrishna, Indian mystic
14. Anna Whistler, mother of American-born painter James Abbott McNeill Whistler, as he immortalized her in Arrangement in Grey and Black No. 1
15. Patrice Lumumba, Congolese independence leader and first democratically elected prime minister, assassinated
16. Russ Colombo, American baritone ("You Call it Madness but I Call it Love") and songwriter ("Too Beautiful for Words")
17. Karl Marx, German philosopher, joint author of The Communist Manifesto
18. Chico Marx, American comedy actor, one of the Marx Brothers
19. Albert Camus, French philosopher and author, contributed to the rise of the philosophy known as absurdism
20. Edgar Allan Poe, American writer of poetry and macabre; inventor of the mystery story
21. Henri Rousseau, French post-impressionist painter in the naïve or primitive manner
22. Sholem Aleichem, Yiddish humorist and playwright, one of the founders of modern Yiddish literature
23. Caryl Chessman, American criminal, first American executed for a non-lethal kidnapping. Case led campaign to end capital punishment in California.
24. Alan Freed, American disc jockey, credited with bringing rock and roll into the mainstream.
25. Buster Keaton, American silent-films actor

The slower, more introspective second part notes the commonalities between these twenty-five individuals – Gunga Din being the one fictional character mentioned because his name both rhymed within the context of the lyrics and was a fit to the syllabic count. Those commonalities were these: having sweated beneath the same sun, having looked up in wonder at the same moon, and having wept when it was all done ... for being "done too soon"; that is, whether their life was long or short, for each individual the end came too early.

=== Music ===
The music of "Done Too Soon", which Diamond composed for his own baritone range, is in the key of A major.

The first couplets of each of the first part's two halves range in tone from A3 to A2, and the second couplets are primarily in the tone of Ab3, but these latter couplets each rise to a single B3 note before returning to A3.

The second part starts with a couplet whose two lines have the tones E1-D2-D2-B2, and in toto, its music is almost elegiac in sound.

== Background ==
Diamond says of the song, "It was kind of esoteric, especially at that time. But it's just me trying to say something a little different, just try and jog something in a person's memory, or to elicit a reaction. That's what my job is, to do something a little bit different, and yet something that's me and something that's you."

== Chart performance ==
"Done Too Soon" spent five weeks on Billboard's Hot 100 Singles Chart as the B-side of "I Am... I Said" reaching #65. (The A-side charted for 10 weeks peaking at #4.)

Chart (1971)	Peak position
Canada RPM Top Singles	55
U.S. Billboard Hot 100	65
U.S. Billboard Adult Contemporary	30
U.S. Cash Box Top 100	69
