= Tap Root Manuscript =

Studio album by Neil Diamond
- Released: October 15, 1970
- Recorded: 1970
- Genres: Rock; world
- Length: 35:30
- Label: Uni
- Producers: Tom Catalano, Neil Diamond

Neil Diamond chronology
| Shilo (1970) | Tap Root Manuscript (1970) | Stones (1971) |

Singles from Tap Root Manuscript
- 1. "Soolaimón" Released: April 1970; 2. "Cracklin' Rosie" Released: August 1970; 3. "He Ain't Heavy, He's My Brother" Released: November 5, 1970

Professional ratings
Review scores
| Source | Rating |
|---|---|
| AllMusic | 4/5 stars |
| Rolling Stone | (mixed) |

Tap Root Manuscript is the sixth studio album recorded by Neil Diamond, released in October 1970. It was one of the most experimental albums he ever recorded, featuring rock music fused with prominent African sounds and instruments. The album was a commercial success, going Gold in three months, eventually certified Platinum by the RIAA. The album's success was powered primarily by "Cracklin' Rosie", his first number 1 single, with help from Diamond's cover of "He Ain't Heavy, He's My Brother", which rose to number 20. The latter song had been a major hit for the Hollies the previous year.

While the first side of the LP contained five pop rock songs, side two was a conceptual suite of related songs expressing an African theme, titled "The African Trilogy". Within this suite was the song "Soolaimón", which rose to number 30 in the US. The 19-minute suite saw African folk styles twined with blues and gospel elements to create what Diamond called "a folk ballet". This effort predates many Western pop artists' interest in world music, for instance Peter Gabriel's 1980 founding of World of Music, Arts and Dance (WOMAD), and the African-influenced album Graceland by Paul Simon in 1986. Tap Root Manuscript was one of the most novel experimental recording projects of its time, and the Uni label, to which Diamond was then under contract, initially was not sure whether it would be commercially viable.

Cash Box said of the single "Soolaimón" that "Neil Diamond applies his composer's sophistication in an approach at primitivism that stands apart as a new slant on top forty sound. The effect is very much like a 'Brother Love' and 'Brooklyn Roads' gone afro with excellent results." Record World said that "Neil Diamond is into some far out things with 'Soolaimon.'"

== Track listing ==
All selections written and composed by Neil Diamond except "He Ain't Heavy, He's My Brother," written and composed by Bob Russell and Bobby Scott.

Side one
| No. | Title | Length |
|---|---|---|
| 1. | "Cracklin' Rosie" | 3:00 |
| 2. | "Free Life" | 3:11 |
| 3. | "Coldwater Morning" | 3:20 |
| 4. | "Done Too Soon" | 2:45 |
| 5. | "He Ain't Heavy, He's My Brother" | 3:59 |
| Total length: | | 16:15 |

Side two – The African Trilogy (A Folk Ballet)
| No. | Title | Length |
|---|---|---|
| 1. | "Childsong" | 2:10 |
| 2. | "I Am the Lion" | 2:07 |
| 3. | "Madrigál" | 1:53 |
| 4. | "Soolaimón" | 4:32 |
| 5. | "Missa" | 2:05 |
| 6. | "African Suite" | 4:28 |
| 7. | "Childsong (Reprise)" | 2:00 |
| Total length: | | 19:15 |

== Personnel ==
- Vocals, keyboards, guitar, ukulele, steel guitar: Neil Diamond
- Guitar: Al Casey, David Cohen, Neil LeVang, Don Peake, Louis Shelton
- Steel guitar: Red Rhodes
- Bass guitar: Randy Cierley, Joe Osborn, Ray Pohlman
- Keyboards: Artie Butler, Larry Knechtel, Larry Muhoberac, Marty Paich, Don Randi
- Drums: Hal Blaine, Larry Bunker, Sandra Crouch, Earl Palmer
- Percussion: Gary Coleman, Gene Estes, Emil Richards, Lee Shamburger
- Saxophone: Joe Estren, Andrea Kostelas, Ronnie Lang, Don Menza, Jay Migliori, Tom Scott
- Woodwinds: Shirley Marcus, George Poole, Henry Sigismonti
- Strings: Jim Arkatov, Israel Baker, Benjamin Barrett, Paul Bergstrom, Harry Bluestone, David Burk, Assa Drori, Jesse Ehrlich, James Getzoff, Lee Holdridge, Armand Kaproff, Jan R. Kelley, Ray Kelley, Lou Klaes, Erno Neufeld, Harvey Newmark, Gareth Nuttycombe, Nathaniel Rosen, Nathan Ross, Henry Roth, Myron Sandler, Joseph Saxon, Sidney Sharp, Jack Shulman, Paul Shure
- Horns: Harry Betts, Roger Bobo, Bud Brisbois, Roy Caton, Paul Hubinon, Dick Hyde, Oliver Mitchell, George Roberts, Tony Terran
- Supporting Vocals: Nancy Adams, Sherrill Atwood, Billie Barnum, H.B. Barnum Jr., Mabel Bishop, George Bledsoe, Fred Burton, Merry Clayton, Marjorie Cranford, Oma Drake, Sean Engerman, Joe Greene, Alexander Hale, Christopher Hale, Graynston Hale, Molly Halloran, Gwen Johnson, Lou Johnson, Stacey Johnson, Clydie King, Jessie Kirkland, Bill Lee, Sherlie Matthews, Evelyn Meyer, Dwayne Moody, Matthews Muhoberac, Ekundayo Paris, Kevin Parker, Aubrey Porter, Dean Porter, Ricky Porter, Douglas Schwartz, Jean Sewell, Ed Wallace, Phillip Whigham, John Woodson, Donald Wyatt

== Charts ==
| Chart (1970–1971) | Peak position |
|---|---|
| Australian Albums (Kent Music Report) | 31 |
| Canada Top Albums/CDs (RPM) | 13 |
| UK Albums (Official Charts) | 18 |
| US Billboard 200 | 13 |

== Certifications ==
| Region | Certification | Certified units/sales |
|---|---|---|
| United States (RIAA) | Platinum | 1,000,000^{^} |
^{^} Shipments figures based on certification alone.
