= Stones (Neil Diamond album) =

Studio album by Neil Diamond
- Released: November 5, 1971
- Recorded: 1971
- Genre: Pop
- Length: 33:22
- Label: Uni
- Producer: Tom Catalano

Neil Diamond chronology
Tap Root Manuscript (1970)	Stones (1971)	Moods (1972)

Singles from Stones
- 1. "I Am... I Said" Released: March 15, 1971; 2. "Stones" Released: October 7, 1971

Professional ratings
Review scores
Source	Rating
AllMusic	4/5 stars
Rolling Stone	(mixed)

Stones is the seventh studio album by Neil Diamond, recorded and released in 1971. It was one of the biggest hit recordings of his career. The conductors and arrangers were Lee Holdridge, Marty Paich and Larry Muhoberac.

The cover photo was taken at Luxford House, Crowborough, East Sussex. The house was owned at the time by rock music manager Tony Stratton Smith.

Early copies of the LP album featured a picture label and a unique version of the cover with a grommet-string style closure on the back. The cover itself was styled as an envelope that opened from the top. This was later abandoned and replaced with a standard side-opening sleeve.

Inspired by the experience of a failed screen test for a film about rebel comic Lenny Bruce, " 'I Am...I Said' would ultimately turn out to be the single most challenging and time-consuming song that [Diamond] ever wrote." And while "it took four months every day, all day...It was a daily battle to put that song on paper...but when it was done, it turned out to be one of the most satisfying songs I had ever written."

Record World said that the title track showed that Diamond "hasn't lost his knack of writing intelligent pop-oriented material." Cash Box said that the "striking image-laden ballad in fine Diamond fashion sparkles with immediate top 40 success." Billboard called it "exceptional ballad material with a performance to match."

== Track listing ==
Side one
No.	Title	Writer(s)	Length
1.	"I Am... I Said"	Neil Diamond	3:32
2.	"The Last Thing on My Mind"	Tom Paxton	3:31
3.	"Husbands and Wives"	Roger Miller	3:54
4.	"Chelsea Morning"	Joni Mitchell	2:32
5.	"Crunchy Granola Suite"	Neil Diamond	3:14

Side two
No.	Title	Writer(s)	Length
1.	"Stones"	Neil Diamond	3:02
2.	"If You Go Away"	Jacques Brel, Rod McKuen	3:47
3.	"Suzanne"	Leonard Cohen	4:41
4.	"I Think It's Gonna Rain Today"	Randy Newman	2:36
5.	"I Am... I Said (Reprise)"	Neil Diamond	2:33

== Charts ==
Chart (1971–1972)	Peak position
Australian Albums (Kent Music Report)	13
Canada Top Albums/CDs (RPM)	10
German Albums (Offizielle Top 100)	28
UK Albums (Official Charts)	17
US Billboard 200	11

== Certifications ==
Region	Certification	Certified units/sales
United States (RIAA)	Gold	500,000^{^}
^{^} Shipments figures based on certification alone.
