= Stones (Neil Diamond song) =

- German picture sleeve

Single by Neil Diamond

from the album Stones
- B-side: "Crunchy Granola Suite"
- Released: October 7, 1971
- Recorded: 1971
- Genre: Pop
- Length: 3:02
- Label: Uni
- Songwriter: Neil Diamond
- Producer: Tom Catalano

Neil Diamond singles chronology
"I'm a Believer" (1971)	"Stones" (1971)	"Song Sung Blue" (1972)

"Stones" is the title track of the seventh studio album by American singer-songwriter Neil Diamond, recorded and released as a single in 1971.

== Background ==
Diamond describes the song as "a desperate love song. Stones to me had always meant things that hurt people, things that cause pain." He rarely plays the song live for sentimental reasons.

== Reception ==
Record World's November 6, 1971 issue stated that the song showed that Diamond "hasn't lost his knack of writing intelligent pop-oriented material." Cash Box, in an issue published on the same day said that the "striking image-laden ballad in fine Diamond fashion sparkles with immediate top 40 success." Billboard called it "exceptional ballad material with a performance to match." In the United States, the song remained on the Billboard Hot 100 for 9 weeks, peaking at No. 14.

== Charts ==
Chart (1971-72)	Peak position
US Billboard Hot 100	14
US Billboard Adult Contemporary	2
Australia (Kent Music Report)	24
Canadian RPM Top Singles	15
Germany (GfK)	26
New Zealand	7
