= Play Me =

Single by Neil Diamond

from the album Moods
- B-side: "Porcupine Pie"
- Released: August 1972
- Genre: Pop
- Length: 3:54
- Label: Uni 55346
- Songwriter: Neil Diamond
- Producer: Tom Catalano

Neil Diamond singles chronology
"Song Sung Blue" (1972)	"Play Me" (1972)	"Walk On Water" (1972)

"Play Me" is a 1972 song by Neil Diamond from his album Moods. The song, the first single from Moods, was recorded in February 1972 in Los Angeles. It was released as a single in May 1972 and peaked at #11 in the United States in September of that year. It was listed by Billboard as #27 of his best 30 songs.

The "catchy pop-rock" song is a medium-tempo waltz performed in 3/4 time at a standard tempo of 102 bpm. Play Me features broken chords played on the acoustic guitar, courtesy of Diamond's long-time collaborator Richard Bennett. While Bennett had played on a few songs on Diamond's 1971 album Stones, Moods was his first full collaboration with him, establishing Bennett as one of Diamond's essential players, playing on every Diamond album until 1987 and touring with him for 17 years.

== Reception ==
=== Female praise ===
"Play Me" is an audience favorite, especially among women, who carry signs that read "Neil, Play Me" to his performances and scream "me, me, me" when he plays the tune, described as "an entreaty to romance". Along with "Love on the Rocks" and "You Don't Bring Me Flowers", it is one of the "baritone ballads" that have "60-year-old women erupting in girlish screams;" it makes female audience members shriek and swoon. According to Melissa Ruggieri, writing for Media General about a 2008 concert, "Diamond [at 67] also still possesses the ability to charm, even though he didn't need to do much except wiggle his prominent eyebrows at women in the crowd to elicit schoolgirl-like squeals—'Play Me,' in particular, had a bizarre aphrodisiac effect."

Singer/songwriter Mary Lee Kortes, while performing it in 2000 in New York, suggested that she had lost her virginity to the song. Nancy Sinatra said, "'Play Me' is my favorite [Neil Diamond] song, because it is sexy."

=== Critical acclaim ===
It is widely praised by critics and musicians as well; it is among the top-ten favorite songs of American writer and critic David Wild. Wild was especially fond of the lines "You are the sun, I am the moon / You are the words, I am the tune / Play me", and other writers have cited the lines as well. Diamond himself has referred to those lines, for instance in an apology to a 2008 Columbus, Ohio, audience, for performing with a raspy voice while suffering from acute laryngitis. Billboard described it as a "potent cut." Cash Box described it as "a ballad about he, she and the music" and considered it to be "delicious". Record World called it a "sweet and smooth ballad, seemingly born to be covered."

=== Lyrical criticism ===
The song also has its detractors, and "Play Me" is not the only Diamond song criticized by some for its lyrics. Janice Kennedy said the song was "an exercise in fingernail-on-blackboard painfulness: 'Song she sang to me, song she brang to me.'" American humorist Dave Barry also cited those lines, claiming that they made him like the song. Martin Pearson also criticised that line, commenting "Ugh! It's "brought", you horrible little American!"

=== Academic criticism ===
This song has also created significant debates in academic circles regarding the development of language and meaning within language, especially within the context of popular American songwriting. "If "moose" pluralizes to "moose", but "goose" pluralizes to "geese", then why can't the word "brang" be used as the past participle of "bring" instead of "brought"?. Who says that "brought" is sacrosanct in that case?" argued singer-songwriter David Persons at a symposium on songwriting and creative writing held at Stephen F. Austin University. "There really are no rules in the practical sense in creative uses of English, and I am always thankful that I am a native English speaker, as it has so many irregularities and non-rules that it must be near impossible to learn as a second language. New words develop from new meanings and linguistic demands, and Neil Diamond's writing has made several significant contributions to that development throughout his career as he has added his own personal mark of genius to The Great American Songbook. In this case the rule has to be "Neil Diamond wrote it, I heard it and that settles it, Brang is in fact a word."

== Chart history ==
=== Weekly charts ===
Chart (1972)	Peak position
Australia (Kent Music Report)	25
Germany	28
Canada RPM Adult Contemporary	3
Canada Top Singles (RPM)	6
US Billboard Hot 100	11
US Adult Contemporary (Billboard)	3
U.S. Cash Box Top 100	16

=== Year-end charts ===
Chart (1972)	Rank
U.S. (Joel Whitburn's Pop Annual)	105

== Notable covers ==
- Gene Ammons appears on album Got My Own.
- Jose Feliciano
- Josh Groban
- U2
- In 2008, Kate Ceberano recorded a version for her album So Much Beauty.
