= I Am... I Said =

Single by Neil Diamond

from the album Stones
- B-side: "Done Too Soon"
- Released: March 15, 1971
- Genre: Pop rock
- Length: 3:32
- Label: Uni
- Songwriter: Neil Diamond
- Producer: Tom Catalano

Neil Diamond singles chronology
"Do It" (1970)	"I Am... I Said" (1971)	"Done Too Soon" (1971)

Music video
- "I Am... I Said" by Neil Diamond on YouTube

"I Am... I Said" is a song written and recorded by Neil Diamond. Released as a single on March 15, 1971, it was quite successful, at first slowly climbing the charts and then more quickly rising to number 4 on the U.S. pop singles chart by May 1971. It fared similarly across the Atlantic, reaching number 4 on the UK pop singles chart as well.

== Inspiration ==
"I Am... I Said", which took Diamond four months to compose, is one of his most intensely personal efforts, making reference to both Los Angeles and New York City. Diamond told Mojo magazine in July 2008 that the song came from a time he spent in therapy in Los Angeles. He said:

It was consciously an attempt on my part to express what my dreams were about, what my aspirations were about and what I was about. And without any question, it came from my sessions with the analyst.

In the same month, he told Q that the song was written "to find [him]self" and added, "It's a tough thing for me to gather myself after singing that song."

Diamond has also given another inspiration for this song: an unsuccessful tryout for a movie about the life and death of the comedian Lenny Bruce. Author David Wild interviewed Diamond for a 2008 book and he discussed how his efforts to channel Lenny Bruce evoked such intense emotions that it led him to spend some time in therapy.

== Reception ==
Critical opinion on "I Am... I Said" has generally been positive, with Rolling Stone calling its lyric excellent in a 1972 review, while The New Yorker used it to exemplify Diamond's songwriting opaqueness in a 2006 retrospective. Cash Box described the song as having "excellent production and performance." Record World said "Personal number does Descartes' 'I think therefore I am' one better and Neil's philosophy always makes the charts"

A 2008 Diamond profile in The Daily Telegraph simply referred to the song's "raging existential angst," and Allmusic calls it "an impassioned statement of emotional turmoil... very much in tune with the confessional singer/songwriter movement of the time."

The song was not without its detractors, however. In a 2012 book about bad songs, humorist Dave Barry extensively ridiculed the line "... no one heard at all, not even the chair".

The song garnered Diamond his first Grammy Awards nomination, for Best Pop Vocal Performance, Male.

== Charts ==
=== Weekly charts ===
Chart (1971)	Peak position
Australia (Kent Music Report)	10
Belgium (Ultratop 50 Flanders)	8
Belgium (Ultratop 50 Wallonia)	19
Canada RPM Top Singles	2
Germany (GfK)	3
Ireland (IRMA)	1
Netherlands (Single Top 100)	6
New Zealand (Listener)	1
South Africa (Springbok)	1
Switzerland (Schweizer Hitparade)	2
UK	4
US Billboard Hot 100	4
US Adult Contemporary (Billboard)	2
U.S. Cash Box Top 100	4

=== Year-end charts ===
Chart (1971)	Rank
Canada	29
Netherlands	54
U.S. Billboard Hot 100	91
U.S. Cash Box	84

== Certifications ==
Region	Certification	Certified units/sales
New Zealand (RMNZ)	Platinum	30,000^{‡}
United Kingdom (BPI)	Silver	200,000^{‡}
^{‡} Sales+streaming figures based on certification alone.

== Other versions ==
"I Am... I Said" was included on Diamond's November 1971 album Stones. The single version leads off the LP, while a reprise of the song, taken from midway to a variant ending with Diamond exclaiming "I am!", concludes. It has also been included in live versions on Diamond's Hot August Night (from 1972, in a performance that Rolling Stone would later label "fantastically overwrought").

Checkmates, Ltd. released a version of the song on their 1971 album, Life. Brooke White performed the song on American Idol's seventh season during its Neil Diamond week, changing the lyric to replace New York City with her home state of Arizona. Among the foreign versions are the Italian language "La casa degli angeli" ("House of the angels"), performed by Caterina Caselli in 1971's album Una grande emozione ("A great emotion"), and by Dutchman Jan Rot on his 2008 album Hallelujah as "Zeg God... zeg ik", taking the title as someone who curses, while the Jewish word for God means 'I am'. The Brazilian singer Diana recorded the song as "Porque Brigamos" ("Why we argue") in 1972, with lyrics written by the composer and producer Rossini Pinto. The band Killdozer also covered the song on their 1987 album Little Baby Buntin'. Jamaican reggae singer Mikey Spice released the album I Am I Said in 2014, including a cover of this song. Country artist Billy Ray Cyrus released a version of the song on his 2020 EP Singin Hills Sessions Volume 1.

== See also ==
- Dave Barry's Book of Bad Songs
- List of songs about New York City
- Clint Eastwood at the 2012 Republican National Convention
