= Cracklin' Rosie =

Single by Neil Diamond

from the album Tap Root Manuscript
- B-side: "Lordy"
- Released: July 30, 1970
- Genre: Soft rock, pop
- Length: 2:54
- Label: Uni
- Songwriter: Neil Diamond
- Producer: Tom Catalano

Neil Diamond singles chronology
"Until It's Time For You To Go" (1970)	"Cracklin' Rosie" (1970)	"He Ain't Heavy, He's My Brother" (1970)

"Cracklin' Rosie" is a song written and recorded by Neil Diamond in 1970, with instrumental backing by Los Angeles session musicians from the Wrecking Crew, including Hal Blaine on drums, Larry Knechtel on keyboards, Joe Osborn on bass, Al Casey on guitar and Gene Estes on percussion – arranged by Don Randi. The song was included on Diamond's album Tap Root Manuscript. In October 1970 the song became Diamond's first American No. 1 hit within the Billboard Hot 100, and his third to sell a million copies. It was his breakthrough single on the UK Singles Chart, reaching No. 3 for four weeks in November and December. Billboard ranked the record as the No. 17 song of 1970. It also reached No. 2 on both the Australian and Irish singles charts. Its best performance was in New Zealand, where it stayed at No. 1 for five weeks at the end of the year.

The single version released by Uni Records was in mono, while the album version from Tap Root Manuscript was in stereo.

== Song meaning ==
Married to a catchy and dynamic melody and arrangement, the lyrics suggested to some a devotion to a prostitute:

Oh, I love my Rosie child —
You got the way to make me happy.
You and me, we go in style...
Cracklin' Rose, you're a store-bought woman
But you make me sing like a guitar hummin' ...

The stories about how Diamond was inspired to write the song are apocryphal. "Crackling Rosé" is the name of an inexpensive sparkling wine once produced by Andres Wines of British Columbia, Canada, which was popular among the Indigenous population. One story suggests that Diamond heard a story about a native Canadian tribe while interviewing in Toronto, Canada—the tribe had more men than women, so the lonely men of the tribe would sit around the fire and drink their wine together—which inspired him to write the song. Neil himself has told this story in at least one live performance.

Biographer Rich Wiseman interviewed Diamond's bass player, Randy Ceirley, who remembered the song originating from a Toronto student newspaper reporter who interviewed Diamond in 1970:

And this girl came down from a local paper, a college paper or something, and was trying to interview Neil. Somehow she had gotten in. And I think the only reason she had gotten in was she was cute and bubbly . . .

And Neil used to have a trick he pulled on interviewers, which was . . . he would end up interviewing them. He started doing this to [her]. 'What goes on around here?' And I sat and watched . . .

"Somehow the conversation got around to these Indian reservations—and the ratio of like one woman to 100 men. And Neil said, 'How do these guys spend the weekend?' 'Oh, they go out with Rose.' 'Who?' 'Cracklin' Rose.' He said 'What?' And she said, 'They go down to the store and buy a bottle of Cracklin' Rosé wine and get mashed—that's their weekend. And their girlfriend is Cracklin' Rose.' And I saw a look in Neil's eye. I knew there was a song coming.

== Reception ==
Record World said that it "has the sound of a classic like 'Sweet Caroline'" and "an excellent chance for quick gold." Billboard called it a "clever rhythm item that has it to hit with all the potent sales of another 'Sweet Caroline' or 'Holly Holy.'"

== Charts ==
=== Weekly charts ===
Chart (1970–71)	Peak position
Australia (Kent Music Report)	2
Austria (Ö3 Austria Top 40)	6
Belgium (Ultratop 50 Flanders)	2
Belgium (Ultratop 50 Wallonia)	5
Canada Top Singles (RPM)	1
Ireland (IRMA)	2
Netherlands (Single Top 100)	6
New Zealand (Listener)	1
Norway (VG-lista)	1
South Africa (Springbok)	1
UK Singles (Official Charts)	3
US Billboard Hot 100	1
US Easy Listening (Billboard)	2
US Cash Box Top 100	1
West Germany (GfK)	7

=== Year-end charts ===
Chart (1970)	Rank
Australia	29
Canada	8
Netherlands	62
South Africa	5
US Billboard Hot 100	17
US Cash Box Top 100	14

== Certifications ==
Region	Certification	Certified units/sales
New Zealand (RMNZ)	Platinum	30,000^{‡}
United Kingdom (BPI)	Gold	400,000^{‡}
United States (RIAA)	Platinum	1,000,000^{^}
^{^} Shipments figures based on certification alone.^{‡} Sales+streaming figures based on certification alone.

== Cover versions ==
Mexican singer Roberto Jordán recorded a Spanish language version of the song, titled "Rosa marchita" (Which Means "Withered rose"). The lyrics of this version depart from the original Neil Diamond lyrics, instead telling a story about a lost love. This version topped the charts in Mexico in 1971.

The Rudy Schwartz Project has recorded a version of the song, including it on the album "Don't Get Charred, Get Puffy".
