= Sweet Caroline =

1969 single by Neil Diamond

Single by Neil Diamond

from the album Brother Love's Travelling Salvation Show
- B-side: "Dig In"
- Released: May 28, 1969
- Studio: American Sound (Memphis)
- Genre: Soft rock
- Length: 3:21 (LP Version); 2:51 (Single Edit)
- Label: Uni/MCA
- Songwriter: Neil Diamond
- Producers: Tommy Cogbill; Neil Diamond; Tom Catalano

Neil Diamond singles chronology
"Brother Love's Traveling Salvation Show" (1969)	"Sweet Caroline" (1969)	"Holly Holy" (1969)

Official audio
- "Sweet Caroline" on YouTube

"Sweet Caroline" (Note: Also titled as "Sweet Caroline (Good Times Never Seemed So Good)") is a song written and performed by American singer Neil Diamond and released as a single on May 28, 1969. It was arranged by Charles Calello, and recorded at American Sound Studio in Memphis, Tennessee.

== Inspiration ==
Neil Diamond has provided different explanations for the song's origins. In a 2007 interview, he stated the inspiration for the song was John F. Kennedy's daughter Caroline Kennedy, who was 12 years old at the time it was released. Diamond sang the song for her at her 50th birthday celebration in 2007. On December 21, 2011, in an interview on CBS's The Early Show, Diamond said that a magazine cover photo of Caroline Kennedy as a young child on a horse with her parents John F. Kennedy and Jacqueline Kennedy created an image in his mind, and the rest of the song came together about five years after seeing the picture. However, in 2014, Diamond said the song was about his then-wife Marcia Murphey, but he needed a three-syllable name to fit the melody.

== Performance ==
The song reached No. 4 on the Billboard Hot 100 chart in the week ending August 16, 1969, and was certified gold by the RIAA on August 18, 1969, for sales of one million singles. "Sweet Caroline" was also the first of Diamond's 58 entries on the US Easy Listening chart, peaking at No. 3.

In the autumn of 1969, Diamond performed "Sweet Caroline" on several television shows. It later reached No. 8 on the UK Singles Chart in March 1971.

In July 2021, "Sweet Caroline" re-entered the UK Singles Chart again 50 years after its first UK release, following its use by England supporters during Euro 2020. It re-entered the chart at No. 48 on the week ending July 15 and a week later it rose to No. 20.

== Critical reception ==
Cash Box called the song "sensational", highlighting the fact that Diamond's "material and production sound take on a completely different dimension in this love ballad which maintains a warm glow throughout with occasional surges of strength". Record World said that "Neil Diamond stirs rich excitement with this voluptuous new 'Sweet Caroline'." Billboard called it a "hard hitting love ballad" with "exceptional production and vocal workout". The song has proven to be enduringly popular and, as of November 2014, has sold over two million digital downloads in the United States.

== Chart history ==
=== Weekly charts ===
Chart (1969)	Peak position
Australia (KMR)	3
Canada Adult Contemporary (RPM)	2
Canada Top Singles (RPM)	3
South Africa (Springbok)	7
US Billboard Hot 100	4
US Adult Contemporary (Billboard)	3
US Cash Box Top 100	3

Chart (1971)	Peak position
Ireland (IRMA)	9
Netherlands (Single Top 100)	16
UK Singles (Official Charts)	8
Germany (GfK)	37

Chart (2008)	Peak position
UK Singles (Official Charts)	63

Chart (2021)	Peak position
UK Singles (Official Charts)	20

Chart (2022)	Peak position
UK Singles (Official Charts)	89

Chart (2024)	Peak position
UK Singles (Official Charts)	44

Chart (2025)	Peak position
Czech Republic Airplay (ČNS IFPI) Two Friends remix	57

=== Year-end charts ===
Chart (1969)	Rank
Canada Top Singles (RPM)	37
US Billboard Hot 100	22
US Cash Box	26

== Certifications ==
Region	Certification	Certified units/sales
Denmark (IFPI Danmark)	Gold	45,000^{‡}
Germany (BVMI)	Gold	300,000^{‡}
New Zealand (RMNZ)	5× Platinum	150,000^{‡}
Spain (Promusicae)	Platinum	60,000^{‡}
United Kingdom (BPI) since 2004	4× Platinum	2,400,000^{‡}
United States (RIAA)	Platinum	1,000,000^{^}
United States digital sales	—	2,456,102
^{^} Shipments figures based on certification alone.^{‡} Sales+streaming figures based on certification alone.

== Alternative versions ==
There are three distinct mixes of this song. In the original mono 45 mix, the orchestra and glockenspiel are more prominent than in the stereo version on the Brother Love's Travelling Salvation Show LP. The third version was a remix found only on the initial CD release of Diamond's 1974 compilation His 12 Greatest Hits. This version has the orchestra mixed down and has the background vocals mixed up. It has a longer fade as well. A version of the song is on his 1972 live album Hot August Night; this version was included on the initial LP release of His 12 Greatest Hits.

During the COVID-19 pandemic, Diamond changed some of the lyrics to "Hands ... washing hands ... don't touch me ... I won't touch you."

== Use at sporting events ==
=== United States ===
The song has been played at Fenway Park, home of Major League Baseball's Boston Red Sox, since at least 1997 and in the middle of the eighth inning at every game since 2002. On opening night of the 2010 season at Fenway Park, the song was performed live by Diamond himself. Several days after the Boston Marathon bombing in April 2013, Neil Diamond led the crowd at Fenway Park in a rendition of the song. The New York Yankees, the longtime rivals, showed their support for the city by playing the song over Yankee Stadium's loudspeakers the day after the incident. Sales of the song surged nearly 600 percent in the week after the bombings, to 19,000 copies, up from 2,800 the week before. Diamond said that he would donate his royalties from those sales to the One Fund Boston charity to help the people affected by the bombings.

=== United Kingdom ===
In the United Kingdom, the song has become a prominent pre‑fight anthem at boxing events, particularly those promoted by Matchroom Boxing, Queensberry Promotions and Boxxer. Its regular use is widely attributed to promoter Eddie Hearn, who incorporated the song into his events as a crowd-pleasing singalong, typically played just before the main event and fighter ring walks. Although the song has no direct historical connection to boxing, its catchy chorus and communal appeal made it ideal for energising crowds, and it became a staple feature of British boxing atmospheres during the 2010s. Over time, the tradition has evolved into an expected ritual before headline bouts, helping create the loud, singalong atmosphere that fans have come to expect on a big fight night in the UK.

=== Australia ===
In Australia, the song is played at half-time of Brisbane Broncos home games at Suncorp Stadium.

== Personnel ==
- Neil Diamond – vocals, acoustic guitar
- Charles Calello – string, horn and vocal arrangements
- The Memphis Boys – other instrumentation
  - Gene Chrisman – drums
  - Tommy Cogbill – bass guitar
  - Bobby Emmons – keyboards
  - Reggie Young – electric guitar

== Legacy ==
In 2019, "Sweet Caroline" was selected by the Library of Congress for preservation in the National Recording Registry for being "culturally, historically, or aesthetically significant". In 2020 the song was inducted into the Grammy Hall of Fame. In June 2026, CBS News included the song in its list of the 250 essential American songs of the past 250 years.

== DJ Ötzi version ==
Austrian singer DJ Ötzi released a version of the song in 2009 through UMG. His version reached number 19 on the German singles chart, staying for 18 weeks in the German charts. It also peaked at number 18 on the Austrian charts. The song was also included on his album Hotel Engel (Gold Edition).

=== Track listings ===
CD single

1. "Sweet Caroline" (single version) - 3:37
2. "Sweet Caroline" (DJ mix) - 3:46

2009 Limited Edition CD single

1. "Sweet Caroline" (single version) - 3:37
2. Exclusive Bonus Video (Gerry Friedle: Mein Leben mit DJ Ötzi) - 19:04

2010 CD single

1. "Sweet Caroline" (single version) - 3:37
2. "Sweet Caroline" (Euro 2010 Magic Moments version) - 3:46

=== Charts ===
Chart (2009–2010)	Peak position
Austria (Ö3 Austria Top 40)	18
Germany (Official German Charts)	19

== Other versions ==
In 1970, Elvis Presley recorded "Sweet Caroline" during his residency at The International. On February 16th, 1970, his cover was recorded and released in his album On Stage.

In 1973, Roy Orbison recorded a cover of "Sweet Caroline" for his album Milestones, his final album for MGM Records. Orbison had performed the song the previous year during a concert at Festival Hall in Melbourne on 3 October 1972; the performance was later broadcast on Australian television in 1973.

In 2001, a version by Dustin the Turkey for the compilation Dustin's Greatest Hits reached No. 1 on the Irish Singles Chart, the character's sixth Irish number one.
