= Brother Love's Travelling Salvation Show (song) =

Single by Neil Diamond

from the album Brother Love's Travelling Salvation Show
- B-side: "A Modern Day Version of Love"
- Released: January 29, 1969
- Genre: Pop rock
- Length: 3:30 (45 label states 3:08)
- Label: Uni
- Songwriter: Neil Diamond
- Producers: Tommy Cogbill; Chips Moman

Neil Diamond singles chronology
"Sunday Sun" (1968)	"Brother Love's Travelling Salvation Show" (1969)	"Sweet Caroline" (1969)

"Brother Love's Travelling Salvation Show" is a song written and recorded by Neil Diamond which appeared as the opening track on the eponymous album. Released as a single in early 1969, it hit number 22 on the U.S. pop singles chart, number 5 on the New Zealand Listener charts and number 9 in Canada.

== Background ==
The song tells the story of Brother Love, an evangelist who travels from town to town preaching. In the middle of the song, Diamond gives a sermon in typical evangelical style.

The original 45 mix of the title cut differs from the album version. Aside from being in mono, extra reverb is used throughout the whole song. Neil Diamond's voice was overdubbed onto the lead vocal, creating a harmony. A tubular bell part was added following the phrase "Take my hand in yours...". The fade-out of the song is longer, with a louder horn section and a rattling tambourine part. All of Diamond's CD compilations have used the album mix.

Billboard described the single as a "powerful piece of rhythm material with a potent lyric." Cash Box said "Revivalist sounds, building in AGP works of late, are added to Neil Diamond's latest opus to strengthen his latent rhythm and give a new direction to the artist's material." Record World called it "a Memphis beauty."

The New Rolling Stone Album Guide calls "Brother Love's Travelling Salvation Show" "genuinely demented."

== Other versions ==
In 1969, Peggy Lee sang a cover version of the song on her Grammy-awarded album Is That All There Is?.

Dolly Parton has performed the song on numerous occasions, including on her 1976-77 variety show, as during her 1983 concert at London's Dominion Theatre, which was later broadcast as the TV special Dolly in London.

Sonny & Cher covered it on Mama Was a Rock and Roll Singer, Papa Used to Write All Her Songs.

David Spade lip-synched, and then sang the song while imitating Neil Diamond in his 1999 film Lost & Found.

Country group The Wright Brothers Band did a cover version of the song, changing "Take my hand in yours" to "Take my hand, dear Lord."

In 2019, the song was used in the trailer for the film Once Upon a Time in Hollywood, as well as in the film itself, and is included on the film's soundtrack.
