= Holly Holy =

Single by Neil Diamond

from the album Touching You, Touching Me
- B-side: "Hurtin' You Don't Come Easy"
- Released: October 13, 1969
- Genre: Pop, soft rock
- Length: 4:27 (single version); 4:40 (album version)
- Label: Uni
- Songwriter: Neil Diamond
- Producers: Tom Catalano, Tommy Cogbill

Neil Diamond singles chronology
"Sweet Caroline" (1969)	"Holly Holy" (1969)	"Shilo" (1970)

"Holly Holy" is a song written and recorded by Neil Diamond with instrumental backing provided by the American Sound Studio house band in Memphis. Released as a single on October 13, 1969, it was a successful follow up to "Sweet Caroline", reaching #6 on the U.S. pop singles chart by December. The song also reached #5 on the Easy Listening chart. It became a gold record and then eventually a platinum record.

While it is a love song, it also has a spiritual focus. Its storyline and style were influenced by gospel music. The first lyrics are sung by Diamond alone. But in the second verse, a gospel choir is accompanying him as the song builds in intensity. Later lyrics echo a Bible story: "Touch a man who can't walk upright and that lame man, he's gonna fly."

Record World predicted the song "will be as famous as its author and constant hitmaker." It was Diamond's favorite of the songs he had written to that point.

"Holly Holy" was later included on Diamond's November 1969 album Touching You, Touching Me. It has been included in live versions on Diamond's Hot August Night (from 1972) and Greatest Hits: 1966–1992 (from 1992) as well as various compilations.

== Chart history ==
=== Weekly charts ===
Chart (1969–70)	Peak position
Australia (Kent Music Report)	6
Canada RPM Adult Contemporary	6
Canada RPM Top Singles	2
New Zealand (Listener)	6
South Africa (Springbok)	2
U.S. Billboard Hot 100	6
U.S. Billboard Adult Contemporary	3
U.S. Cash Box Top 100	4

=== Year-end charts ===
Chart (1969)	Rank
U.S. (Joel Whitburn's Pop Annual)	69

Chart (1970)	Rank
Australia	45
Canada	35
