= Song Sung Blue =

Single by Neil Diamond

from the album Moods
- B-side: "Gitchy Goomy"
- Released: May 1972
- Genre: Pop
- Length: 3:15
- Label: Uni
- Songwriter: Neil Diamond
- Producer: Tom Catalano

Neil Diamond singles chronology
"Stones" (1971)	"Song Sung Blue" (1972)	"Play Me" (1972)
- Background singers: Sally Stevens, Susie Stevens, Alison Freebairn-Smith and Jennifer Hicklin

"Song Sung Blue" is a song written and recorded by Neil Diamond, inspired by the second movement of Mozart's Piano Concerto #21. Initially released as a single from Diamond's 1972 album Moods, the song later appeared on many of his live and compilation albums. The song hit the top of the US Billboard Hot 100 chart in July, and spent twelve weeks in the top 40. On the UK Singles Chart, the song peaked at No. 14.

== History ==
"Song Sung Blue" was Diamond's second No. 1 hit in the U.S., after 1970's "Cracklin' Rosie", and to date his last solo No. 1 song (he had a No. 1 duet with Barbra Streisand in 1978, with "You Don't Bring Me Flowers"). In addition, "Song Sung Blue" spent seven weeks at No. 1 on the Adult Contemporary chart. The song has become one of Diamond's standards, and he often performs it during concerts.

"Song Sung Blue" was nominated for two Grammy Awards in 1973, for Record of the Year and Song of the Year. Both awards that year were won by Roberta Flack's rendition of Ewan MacColl's song, "The First Time Ever I Saw Your Face".

Cash Box said of it that "the song gives the phrase 'Everybody, sing!' new meaning." Record World said that it has "simply some of the best and most commercial soft sounds on the contemporary scene."

Diamond described "Song Sung Blue" in the liner notes to his 1996 compilation album, In My Lifetime, as a "very basic message, unadorned. I didn't even write a bridge to it. I never expected anyone to react to "Song Sung Blue" the way they did. I just like it, the message and the way a few words said so many things."

== Later uses ==
The song inspired the title of a 2008 documentary about a Neil Diamond tribute performer who was married to a Patsy Cline tribute performer. The documentary was in turn adapted into a 2025 feature film of the same name, directed by Craig Brewer and starring Hugh Jackman and Kate Hudson.

== Charts ==
=== Weekly charts ===
Chart (1972)	Peak position
Australia (Kent Music Report)	5
Belgium (Ultratop 50 Flanders)	5
Belgium (Ultratop 50 Wallonia)	7
Canada Top Singles (RPM)	2
Canada Adult Contemporary (RPM)	9
Ireland (IRMA)	17
Netherlands (Single Top 100)	3
New Zealand (Listener)	1
Norway (VG-lista)	2
South Africa (Springbok)	5
Switzerland (Schweizer Hitparade)	1
UK	14
US Billboard Hot 100	1
US Adult Contemporary (Billboard)	1
US Cash Box Top 100	1
West Germany (GfK)	6

=== Year-end charts ===
Chart (1972)	Rank
Canada Top Singles (RPM)	19
Switzerland	7
US Billboard Hot 100	26
US Cash Box Top 100	24

== Certifications ==
Region	Certification	Certified units/sales
New Zealand (RMNZ)	Gold	15,000^{‡}
United States (RIAA)	Gold	1,000,000^{^}
^{^} Shipments figures based on certification alone.^{‡} Sales+streaming figures based on certification alone.

== Cover versions ==
Andy Williams released a version in 1972 on his album Alone Again (Naturally).

Hot Butter released a version in 1972 on their album Hot Butter.

Johnny Paycheck released a version in 1972 on his album Somebody Loves Me.

Sacha Distel recorded the song in French as "Chanson Bleue".

British new wave band Altered Images released a version in 1982 on the album Pinky Blue.

Bobby Darin performed the song in 1972 during his summer television show, and his version was included on the 2004 album Aces Back to Back.

Frank Sinatra also recorded a version on his Trilogy album (1980).

The Nolan Sisters recorded a version which is on their 1978 20 Giant Hits album.
