= Uni Records =

Defunct American record label

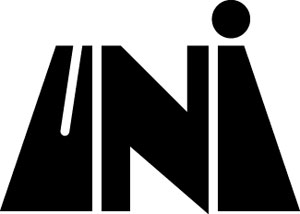
- Parent company: Universal Music Group
- Founded: 1966
- Founder: Ned Tanen
- Status: Folded into MCA Records, since absorbed into Geffen Records
- Distributor: Geffen/UMe (reissues)
- Genre: Various
- Country of origin: United States

Uni Records (short for the label's legal name Universal City Records and rendered as UNI) was an American record label owned by MCA Inc. The brand, which long featured a distinctive UNi logo, was established in 1966 by MCA executive Ned Tanen as a West Coast based label and developed by music industry veteran Russ Regan. Notable artists on Uni included Strawberry Alarm Clock, the Foundations, Hugh Masekela, Brian Hyland, Desmond Dekker, Bill Cosby, Elton John, Neil Diamond, Dave and Ansil Collins, Fever Tree, Olivia Newton-John, Betty Everett, and the Factory (Lowell George, Dallas Taylor, et al.). In 1967, Uni took over management of MCA's newly acquired Kapp Records. In January 1968, Uni received its first gold record from the Recording Industry Association of America, certifying sales of more than one million copies of the Strawberry Alarm Clock single "Incense and Peppermints". Uni also operated Revue Records, a soul music subsidiary, from about 1967 to 1970. In 1971 Uni was merged with Kapp and the co-owned American Decca Records, to form MCA Records. The Decca, Kapp, and Uni labels continued to be used for new releases for a short time, but in late 1972, new releases by their former artists began appearing on the MCA Records label; before long, their back catalogs were transferred to MCA as well. That year, Regan left MCA to revive 20th Century Records for 20th Century Fox.

In 1988, Uni was briefly revived by MCA Records as a niche hipster label, à la Sire Records, with a roster that included Transvision Vamp, Big Bam Boo, Eric B. & Rakim, Swans, Steve Earle, Lord Tracy and a distribution deal with the Bronx-based hip hop label Strong City Records. By the end of 1989, however, Swans was dropped, the deal with Strong City was terminated, and the others were absorbed by the MCA label.

On November 13, 1990, MCA revamped the Uni moniker once more when it changed the name of its music distribution network from MCA Music Distribution Corp to Uni Distribution Corp. In 1996, in the wake of Seagram's purchase of MCA and the merger of the MCA and PolyGram families of labels, it was renamed Universal Music & Video Distribution Inc. In June 2001, it was renamed Universal Music & Video Distribution Corp., and it was changed again in 2006, after the sale of Universal Pictures to NBC, to Universal Music Distribution. Geffen Records manages the Uni catalog today after absorbing the MCA label in 2003.

== Label variations ==
- 1967–1973: Mustard yellow label with lime green, blue, and magenta swirls, followed by lime green colored Uni logo in yellow swirl and another lime green swirl. Many albums during this run were also pressed with custom labels.
- 1988–1989: Blue label with Uni logo in black at top.

== See also ==
- MCA Records
- List of record labels

== Bibliography ==
- Hall, Claude: "MCA Drops Vocalion, Decca, Kapp and Uni", Billboard, February 10, 1973
