= Tom Catalano =

American record producer

Tom Catalano (born April 2, 1933 in New York) is an American record producer, most notable for his long-time collaboration with Neil Diamond. He was the producer on Anne Murray's single "Sunday Sunrise" in 1975 and "The Call" and "Golden Oldie" in 1976. He also produced her album Together in 1975. Other artists whom Catalano has produced over the years include Helen Reddy, Rick Ely, Pat Hollis, Jane Olivor, Mary MacGregor, Bill Medley, Peggy Lee, Lenny Welch, Ruby and the Romantics and The Bold.
