= Neil Diamond's Greatest Hits =

Compilation album by Neil Diamond
- Released: June 1968
- Recorded: 1966–67
- Genre: Rock
- Length: 30:57
- Label: Bang
- Producers: Jeff Barry, Ellie Greenwich

Neil Diamond chronology
| Velvet Gloves and Spit (1968) | Neil Diamond's Greatest Hits (1968) | Brother Love's Travelling Salvation Show (1969) |

Neil Diamond's Greatest Hits is the first compilation album of songs recorded by Neil Diamond. It was released in 1968 by Bang Records after Diamond left Bang for Uni Records. Bang would eventually release four Neil Diamond compilation albums on top of the two original Diamond albums that Bang issued in 1966 and '67. Ten of the twelve songs on this album are original Diamond compositions.

After Columbia Records absorbed Bang Records, this album was replaced by a new compilation titled Classics: The Early Years, which replaced the cover songs with additional Diamond originals: "I'm a Believer" (which became a hit for The Monkees) and "Shilo", which Bang initially rejected as a single but was later released as a single and became a hit in 1970 after this album was released.

Professional ratings
Review scores
| Source | Rating |
|---|---|
| Allmusic | 4.5/5 stars |

== Track listing ==
All tracks are written by Neil Diamond, except as indicated.

Side one
| No. | Title | Original album | Length |
|---|---|---|---|
| 1. | "Cherry, Cherry" | The Feel of Neil Diamond | 2:42 |
| 2. | "Oh No No" | The Feel of Neil Diamond | 2:50 |
| 3. | "New Orleans" (Frank Guida, Joseph Royster) | The Feel of Neil Diamond | 2:24 |
| 4. | "Girl, You'll Be a Woman Soon" | Just for You | 2:48 |
| 5. | "Do It" | The Feel of Neil Diamond | 1:57 |
| 6. | "You Got to Me" | Just for You | 2:45 |

Side two
| No. | Title | Original album | Length |
|---|---|---|---|
| 1. | "Solitary Man" | The Feel of Neil Diamond | 2:43 |
| 2. | "Kentucky Woman" | Non-album single | 2:34 |
| 3. | "Thank the Lord for the Night Time" | Just for You | 2:55 |
| 4. | "Red Red Wine" | Just for You | 2:42 |
| 5. | "Hanky Panky" (Jeff Barry, Ellie Greenwich) | The Feel of Neil Diamond | 1:57 |
| 6. | "The Boat That I Row" | Just for You | 2:40 |
