= A Beautiful Noise (musical) =

2022 Neil Diamond jukebox musical

- Broadway Promotional Poster
- Music: Neil Diamond
- Lyrics: Various artists
- Book: Anthony McCarten
- Basis: The life and music of Neil Diamond
- Premiere: June 21, 2022: Emerson Colonial Theatre
- Productions: Boston (2022); Broadway (2022); US Tour (2024); Australia (2026)

A Beautiful Noise is a jukebox musical based on the life and music of Neil Diamond. It opened on Broadway at the Broadhurst Theatre on December 4, 2022. It grossed more than $1 million at the box office in the week leading up to its Broadway premiere.

Titled for Diamond's 1976 album of the same name, A Beautiful Noise was written by Anthony McCarten and produced by Ken Davenport and Bob Gaudio. The musical is structured around a series of therapy sessions during which Diamond reacts to his lyrics as they are read by his psychiatrist from a second-hand copy of The Complete Lyrics of Neil Diamond. In a June 19, 2022 interview with The Boston Globe McCarten said: “She opens the book, and all 60 years of his songwriting and all that exploration pours out into a majestic musical collage, and once unloosed from the book, the songs take on lives of their own."

== Production history ==
=== Boston (2022) ===
The show had its world premiere at the Emerson Colonial Theatre in Boston in June 2022. Diamond and his wife, Katie McNeil Diamond, attended the opening in Boston. Will Swenson portrayed Diamond (then); Diamond (now) was played by Mark Jacoby. Robyn Hurder played Diamond's second wife, Marcia, and Linda Powell portrayed The Doctor.

=== Broadway (2022–2024) ===
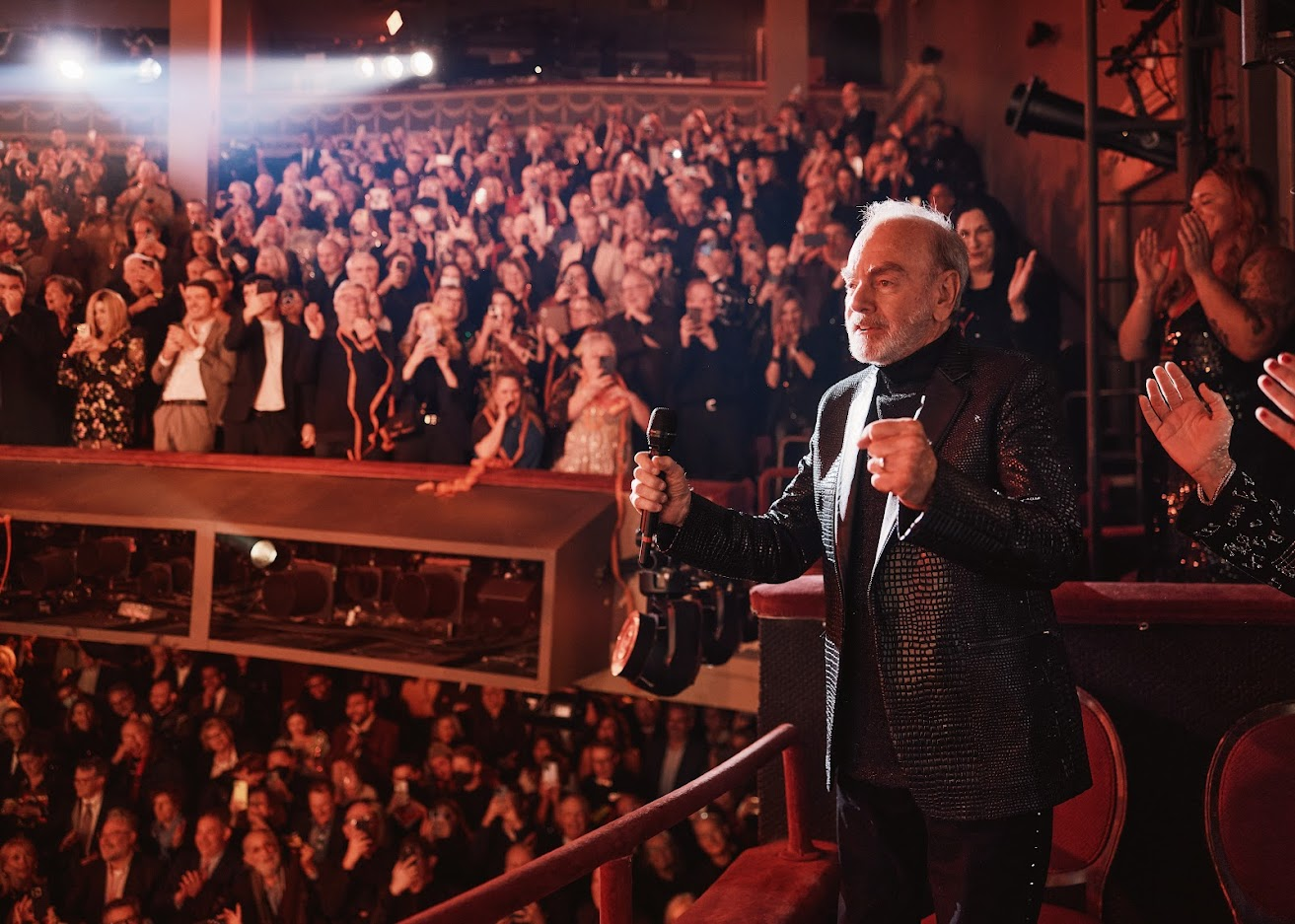
Diamond on opening night

In late 2022, A Beautiful Noise opened on Broadway with Swenson, Jacoby, Hurder and Powell reprising their Boston roles. The full Broadway cast included Jessie Fisher as Jaye Posner, Tom Alan Robbins as Bert Berns and Kieve Diamond, Bri Sudia as Ellie Greenwich and Rose Diamond, and Michael McCormick as Fred Colby and Tommy O'Rourke. The show began previews on November 2, 2022 at the Broadhurst Theatre and formally opened on December 4, 2022. Diamond led an unannounced sing-along of "Sweet Caroline" on opening night.

With ticket sales "up and down" during the preceding months, the show's producers announced in February 2024 that A Beautiful Noise would end its Broadway run on 30 June 2024 after 657 performances. It had grossed more than $63 million when the announcement was made.

=== North American tour (2024-2026) ===
The touring cast includes Nick Fradiani (returning as Neil Diamond - Then), Robert Westenberg (Neil Diamond - Now), Hannah Jewel Kohn (Marcia Murphey), and Lisa Renee Pitts (Doctor).

A North American tour began at the Providence Performing Arts Center on September 21, 2024; it was the most successful tour launch in Providence's history. The tour recouped its investment in five months.

=== Australia (2026) ===
A Beautiful Noise premiered in Melbourne, Australia at the Princess Theatre on August 5, 2026 and, after an extension, will run through November 8, 2026. Swenson reprises his role from the Broadway production, joined by Terence Crawford (Neil Diamond – Now), Ashleigh Rubenach (Marcia Murphey), Monica Sayers (Doctor), and Alana Tranter (Jayne Posner). The production will then transfer to the Sydney Lyric from November 2026.

== Reception ==
Reviews of A Beautiful Noise on Broadway were mixed. Elizabeth Vincentelli wrote in the New York Times that the musical was both "timid" and an "ambitious, often rousing, occasionally heavy-handed biographical show". She praised Swenson's performance but criticized the narrative framework and the overall depiction of Diamond as "morose." A positive review in the New York Daily News predicted that the show would be a "box-office hit". In Variety, A.D. Amorosi wrote: "Ultimately, 'A Beautiful Noise' is victorious, but not without a few rough bumps along the way — much like the trajectory of Diamond’s life." The headline of an AP review by Mark Kennedy in the Washington Post read "Broadway's Diamond show isn't so good, so good" while noting that Swenson was "insanely great in every number." The review that appeared in Entertainment Weekly noted that "those going to A Beautiful Noise want to be entertained and entertained they will be."

== Songs ==
Act I

- "Opening Montage" – The Noise
- "A Beautiful Noise" – Neil and The Noise
- "Neil Pitches Song: I'll Come Runnin' (Oh No, No)" – Neil, Ellie
- "I'm a Believer" – Ellie and The Noise
- "Demo Medley: The Boat that I Row / Red Red Wine / Kentucky Woman" – "The Boat that I Row" Soloist and The Noise
- "Kentucky Woman" – Neil, Ellie and The Noise
- "Into The Bitter End" – Neil, Bitter End Trio Singers and The Noise
- "Solitary Man" – Neil and The Noise
- "Cracklin' Rosie" – Neil and The Noise
- "Song Sung Blue" – Neil, Doctor, Marcia, Fred and The Noise
- "Cherry, Cherry / September Morn' Medley" – Neil, Jaye and The Noise
- "Love on the Rocks" – Neil, Doctor and Jaye
- "Hello Again" – Neil, Marcia, Ellie and Jaye
- "A Heavenly Progression" – Neil and The Noise
- "Sweet Caroline" – Neil and The Noise

Act II

- "Entr'acte" – Company
- "Brother Love's Traveling Salvation Show" – Neil and The Noise
- "Play Me" – Neil, Marcia and The Noise
- "Forever in Blue Jeans" – Marcia, Ellie, Jaye and The Noise
- "Stadium Medley: Soolaimón / Thank the Lord for the Night Time / Crunchy Granola Suite" – Neil, Marcia and The Noise
- "You Don't Bring Me Flowers" – Neil and Marcia
- "Brooklyn Roads / America Medley" – Neil, Doctor, Ellie, Bert and The Noise
- "Shilo" – "Shilo" Soloist, Marcia, Rose, Jaye, Tommy and Kieve
- "I Am... I Said" – Neil and The Noise
- "Holly Holy" – Neil, Marcia, Rose, Jaye, Kieve, Tommy and The Noise

== Cast and characters ==
Characters	Broadway	North American Tour
Characters	2022	2024
Neil Diamond (Then)	Will Swenson	Nick Fradiani
Neil Diamond (Now)	Mark Jacoby	Robert Westenberg
Marcia Murphey	Robyn Hurder	Hannah Jewel Kohn
Doctor	Linda Powell	Lisa Reneé Pitts
Jaye Posner	Jessie Fisher	Tiffany Tatreau
Fred Colby, Tommy O’Rourke	Michael McCormick	Tuck Milligan
Bert Berns, Kieve Diamond	Tom Alan Robbins	Michael Accardo
Ellie Greenwich, Rose Diamond	Bri Sudia	Kate A. Mulligan

=== Notable cast replacements ===
==== Broadway (2022–2024) ====
- Neil Diamond (Then): Nick Fradiani
- Marcia Murphey: Amber Ardolino

== Awards and nominations ==
2022 Broadway production

Year	Award	Category	Nominee	Result
2023	Drama Desk Awards	Outstanding Featured Performance in a Musical	Robyn Hurder	Nominated
2023	Drama Desk Awards	Outstanding Featured Performance in a Musical	Mark Jacoby	Nominated
2023	Drama Desk Awards	Outstanding Wig and Hair	Luc Verschueren	Nominated
2023	Drama League Awards	Distinguished Performance	Will Swenson	Nominated
2023	Drama League Awards	Outstanding Production of a Musical		Nominated
2023	Outer Critics Circle Awards	Outstanding New Broadway Musical		Nominated
2023	Chita Rivera Awards	Outstanding Choreography in a Broadway Show	Steven Hoggett	Won
2023	Chita Rivera Awards	Outstanding Dancer in a Broadway Show	Robyn Hurder	Won
2023	Chita Rivera Awards	Outstanding Dancer in a Broadway Show	Jess LeProtto	Won
2023	Chita Rivera Awards	Outstanding Ensemble in a Broadway Show		Nominated
