= All-Time Greatest Hits (Neil Diamond album) =

Greatest hits album by Neil Diamond
- Released: July 8, 2014
- Genre: Pop
- Length: 78:42
- Label: Capitol

Neil Diamond chronology
Dreams (2010)	All-Time Greatest Hits (2014)	Melody Road (2014)

All-Time Greatest Hits is a compilation album by the American singer-songwriter Neil Diamond. It was released on July 8, 2014 by Capitol Records.

== Reception ==
Professional ratings
Review scores
Source	Rating
AllMusic	4/5 stars
PopMatters	6/10

Stephen Thomas Erlewine of AllMusic called All-Time Greatest Hits a "generous collection of 23 hits from the '60s and '70s" while noting that "this one does a very nice job of sampling from all of Neil's major labels, including Bang, Uni, MCA, and Columbia", with the caveat that "the collection might've been better served if it was sequenced chronologically". In a review of the album for PopMatters, Evan Sawdey stated it "manages to potentially be the most concise and satisfying summation of Neil Diamond's career".

== Track listing ==
No.	Title	Original album	Length
1.	"Cracklin' Rosie"	Tap Root Manuscript, 1981	2:58
2.	"Forever in Blue Jeans"	You Don't Bring Me Flowers, 1978	3:25
3.	"Song Sung Blue"	Moods, 1972	3:05
4.	"Sweet Caroline"	Brother Love's Travelling Salvation Show, 1969	3:20
5.	"Holly Holy"	Touching You, Touching Me, 1969	4:40
6.	"Red Red Wine"	Just for You, 1967	2:42
7.	"Hello Again"	The Jazz Singer, 1981	4:01
8.	"Beautiful Noise"	Beautiful Noise, 1976	3:11
9.	"America"	The Jazz Singer, 1981	4:18
10.	"September Morn"	September Morn, 1979	3:52
11.	"Love on the Rocks"	The Jazz Singer, 1981	3:36
12.	"Shilo"	Just for You, 1967	3:23
13.	"You Don't Bring Me Flowers" (original solo version)	I'm Glad You're Here with Me Tonight, 1977	3:09
14.	"Morningside"	Moods, 1972	4:20
15.	"Soolaimon"	Tap Root Manuscript, 1981	4:31
16.	"Play Me"	Moods, 1972	3:50
17.	"Kentucky Woman"	1967 single	2:25
18.	"Girl, You'll Be a Woman Soon"	Just for You, 1967	2:59
19.	"Solitary Man"	The Feel of Neil Diamond, 1966	2:33
20.	"I'm a Believer"	Just for You, 1967	2:42
21.	"Brother Love's Traveling Salvation Show"	Brother Love's Traveling Salvation Show, 1969	3:29
22.	"Cherry, Cherry"	The Feel of Neil Diamond, 1966	2:42
23.	"I Am... I Said"	Stones, 1971	3:34
Total length:			78:42

== Charts ==
=== Weekly charts ===
Chart performance for All-Time Greatest Hits
Chart (2014)	Peak position
Australian Albums (ARIA)	33
Belgian Albums (Ultratop Flanders)	45
Dutch Albums (Album Top 100)	61
New Zealand Albums (RMNZ)	4
Scottish Albums (Official Charts)	6
Spanish Albums (Promusicae)	89
UK Albums (Official Charts)	18
US Billboard 200	15
US Top Catalog Albums (Billboard)	6

=== Year-end charts ===
Chart (2015)	Position
UK Albums (OCC)	91

== Certifications and sales ==
Region	Certification	Certified units/sales
Australia (ARIA)	Gold	35,000^{^}
United Kingdom (BPI)	2× Platinum	600,000^{‡}
^{^} Shipments figures based on certification alone.^{‡} Sales+streaming figures based on certification alone.
