= The Bang Years 1966–1968 =

Compilation album by Neil Diamond
- Released: 2011
- Recorded: 1966–1968
- Labels: Columbia; Capitol

The Bang Years 1966–1968 is a compilation album by Neil Diamond of Diamond's 23 songs he recorded for Bang Records in mono. Originally issued in 2011 by Columbia Records, it was reissued in 2014 by Capitol Records after Diamond signed with Capitol taking his Bang catalog with him.

== Track listing ==
All songs written by Neil Diamond, except as indicated.

1. Solitary Man
2. Cherry, Cherry
3. Girl, You'll Be a Woman Soon
4. Kentucky Woman
5. Thank the Lord for the Night Time
6. You Got to Me
7. I'm a Believer
8. Red Red Wine
9. The Boat That I Row
10. Do It
11. New Orleans (Frank Guida / Joseph Royster)
12. Monday, Monday (John Phillips)
13. Red Rubber Ball (Paul Simon)
14. I'll Come Running
15. La Bamba
16. The Long Way Home
17. I've Got the Feeling (Oh No No)
18. You'll Forget
19. Love to Love
20. Someday Baby
21. Hanky Panky (Jeff Barry / Ellie Greenwich)
22. The Time Is Now
23. Shilo

== Charts ==
Chart (2011)	Peak position
Belgian Albums (Ultratop Flanders)	86
Belgian Heatseekers Albums (Ultratop Flanders)	5
UK Albums (Official Charts)	88
US Top Current Albums (Billboard)	199
