= Classics: The Early Years =

Compilation album by Neil Diamond
- Released: 1983
- Recorded: 1966–1967
- Genre: Rock
- Length: 33:04
- Label: Columbia
- Producer: Jeff Barry, Ellie Greenwich

Neil Diamond chronology
Heartlight (1982)	Classics: The Early Years (1983)	Primitive (1984)

Professional ratings
Review scores
Source	Rating
Allmusic	5/5 stars

Classics: The Early Years is a compilation album by American musician Neil Diamond released in 1983 featuring the early recordings he made for Bang Records in 1966 and 1967. After CBS acquired the Bang Records catalogue, the twelve best recordings were reissued on this album. Columbia gave Diamond control of the Bang masters of his recordings. The original copyright notice of this album read "(C) and (P)1983 Neil Diamond and CBS Inc." This compilation has a different track lineup than the 1968 Bang compilation album Neil Diamond's Greatest Hits, which contains two cover songs. All the songs in this album are original Diamond compositions. This album substitutes "I'm A Believer" (which The Monkees covered) and "Shilo" in place of the Gary U.S. Bonds hit "New Orleans" and the Tommy James and the Shondells hit "Hanky Panky."

Only a few tracks are in true stereo. Later Neil Diamond compilations contained the mono versions, which makes this album the only source for the stereo versions of his Bang Records releases. The only true stereo version of "Kentucky Woman" was released in 1978 by Frog King records on the album Early Classics.

Cash Box said of the single "I Got the Feelin' (Oh No, No)" that "the gutsy sound of the infectious track backs Diamond’s multi-level, emotion-packed vocal."

== Track listing ==
All songs composed by Neil Diamond.

Side one
No.	Title	Length
1.	"Kentucky Woman"	2:24
2.	"Cherry, Cherry" (single version)	2:41
3.	"Solitary Man" (with overdubs)	2:34
4.	"You Got to Me" (original stereo mix)	2:45
5.	"I Got the Feelin' (Oh No, No)"	2:09
6.	"Thank the Lord for the Night Time" (original stereo mix)	3:02

Side two
No.	Title	Length
1.	"I'm a Believer" (with orchestral overdubs of brass and strings)	2:38
2.	"Girl, You'll Be a Woman Soon"	3:20
3.	"Shilo"	3:49
4.	"Do It"	2:22
5.	"Red Red Wine"	2:39
6.	"The Boat That I Row"	2:41
