= Shilo (album) =

Compilation album by Neil Diamond
- Released: 1970
- Recorded: 1966–1967
- Genre: Rock
- Label: Bang
- Producer: Jeff Barry, Ellie Greenwich

Neil Diamond chronology
| Gold: Recorded Live at the Troubadour (1970) | Shilo (1970) | Tap Root Manuscript (1970) |

Professional ratings
Review scores
| Source | Rating |
|---|---|
| AllMusic | 4/5 stars |

Shilo is a compilation album of songs recorded by Neil Diamond, which was released on September 12, 1970, by Bang Records. Bang released a remixed version of "Shilo" in 1970 which became a hit and inspired this compilation of songs Diamond recorded for Bang in 1966 and 1967 before moving to Uni Records. It reached number 52 on the Billboard 200, and was the best-selling of his Bang albums.

== Track listing ==
Unless otherwise indicated, all songs composed by Neil Diamond.

Side one
| No. | Title | Length |
|---|---|---|
| 1. | "Shilo" | 3:23 |
| 2. | "Kentucky Woman" | 2:34 |
| 3. | "Girl, You'll Be a Woman Soon" | 2:48 |
| 4. | "You Got to Me" | 2:45 |
| 5. | "Monday, Monday" (John Phillips) | 3:03 |
| 6. | "Cherry, Cherry" | 2:42 |

Side two
| No. | Title | Length |
|---|---|---|
| 1. | "Solitary Man" | 2:43 |
| 2. | "I'm a Believer" | 2:43 |
| 3. | "Red Red Wine" | 2:42 |
| 4. | "Thank the Lord for the Night Time" | 2:55 |
| 5. | "I'll Come Running" | 2:50 |
| 6. | "Oh No No (I Got the Feelin')" | 2:50 |
