= Gold: Recorded Live at the Troubadour =

Live album by Neil Diamond
- Released: August 22, 1970
- Recorded: July 15, 1970
- Venues: The Troubadour, Los Angeles
- Genre: Pop rock
- Length: 38:40
- Label: Uni
- Producer: Tom Catalano

Neil Diamond chronology
Touching You, Touching Me (1969)	Gold: Recorded Live at the Troubadour (1970)	Shilo (1970)

Professional ratings
Review scores
Source	Rating
AllMusic	4/5 stars
Rolling Stone	(favorable)

Gold: Recorded Live at the Troubadour is a live album by singer/songwriter Neil Diamond.

While no singles were released in support of the album, the opening track "Lordy" appeared as the B-side of "Cracklin' Rosie". This is the only recording available of this song.

== Track listing ==
All tracks are written by Neil Diamond except "Both Sides Now" by Joni Mitchell.

Side one
No.	Title	Length
1.	"Lordy"	5:00
2.	"Both Sides Now"	4:34
3.	"Solitary Man"	3:05
4.	"Holly Holy"	3:45
5.	"Cherry Cherry"	3:21

Side two
No.	Title	Length
1.	"Kentucky Woman"	2:42
2.	"Sweet Caroline"	3:35
3.	"Thank the Lord for the Night Time"	3:35
4.	"And the Singer Sings His Song"	3:11
5.	"Brother Love's Travelling Salvation Show"	4:53

== Personnel ==
- Neil Diamond – vocals, guitar
- Carol Hunter – guitar
- Eddie Rubin – drums
- Randy Sterling – bass guitar
- Jessie Smith, Venetta Fields, Edna Hunter – backing vocals (uncredited)
- Engineered by Armin Steiner
- Art Direction by John C. LePrevost
- Photography by Jim Metropole

== Charts ==
Chart (1970–1971)	Peak position
Australia (Kent Music Report)	34
Canada Top Albums/CDs (RPM)	2
Dutch Albums (Album Top 100)	36
German Albums (Offizielle Top 100)	35
UK Albums (Official Charts)	23
US Billboard 200	10

== Certifications ==
Region	Certification	Certified units/sales
United Kingdom (BPI)	Silver	60,000^{^}
United States (RIAA)	2× Platinum	2,000,000^{^}
^{^} Shipments figures based on certification alone.
