= Just for You (Neil Diamond album) =

Studio album by Neil Diamond
- Released: August 25, 1967
- Recorded: 1966–67
- Genre: Pop rock
- Length: 30:15
- Label: Bang
- Producers: Jeff Barry, Ellie Greenwich

Neil Diamond chronology
The Feel of Neil Diamond (1966)	Just for You (1967)	Velvet Gloves and Spit (1968)

Just for You is the second album by the American singer-songwriter Neil Diamond. Like his first, it has never been released on CD, though all but two of the tracks were made available on the Classics: The Early Years compilation. All tracks are also available on the compilation album The Bang Years 1966–1968.

At some point or another, every track on it was released either as an A-side or a B-side of a single, with many of them becoming big hits: "You Got to Me" (#18), "Girl, You'll Be a Woman Soon" (#10), "Thank the Lord for the Night Time" (#13), "Red Red Wine" (#62), and "Shilo" (#24 in 1970).

The year-old hit "Cherry Cherry" (from Diamond's first LP) also appears here, while the then-current hit "Kentucky Woman" (#22) does not. "Solitary Man" also re-appears in its 1966 version. This version would be re-released in 1970 and chart at #21. This was Diamond's first album consisting entirely of original material, and his final album for the Bang label.

Professional ratings
Review scores
Source	Rating
Allmusic	link

== Track listing ==
All tracks are written by Neil Diamond.

Side one
No.	Title	Track position on The Bang Years	Length
1.	"Girl, You'll Be a Woman Soon"	3	2:48
2.	"The Long Way Home"	16	2:29
3.	"Red Red Wine"	8	2:42
4.	"You'll Forget"	18	2:50
5.	"The Boat That I Row"	9	2:40
6.	"Cherry, Cherry"	2	2:27

Side two
No.	Title	Track position on The Bang Years	Length
1.	"I'm a Believer"	7	2:43
2.	"Shilo"	23	3:23
3.	"You Got to Me"	6	2:45
4.	"Solitary Man"	1	2:33
5.	"Thank the Lord for the Night Time"	5	2:55
Total length:			30:15

== Charts ==
Chart (1967)	Peak position
US Billboard 200	80
