= Mark Jacoby =

American actor (born 1947)

- Born: May 21, 1947 (age 78); Johnson City, Tennessee, U.S.
- Occupation: Actor
- Years active: 1980–present
- Known for: Ragtime; The Phantom of the Opera; A Beautiful Noise

Mark Jacoby (born May 21, 1947) is an American musical theatre performer who has had leading roles on Broadway in Show Boat, The Phantom of the Opera, Sweet Charity, Ragtime, and A Beautiful Noise, among others. He has also performed widely in national tours, regional theatre and Off-Broadway.

== Career ==
On Broadway, Jacoby appeared in the revival of Sweet Charity from 1986 to 1987. He portrayed The Phantom in The Phantom of the Opera from 1991 to 1993. Jacoby later appeared in the revivals of Grand Hotel, Show Boat, Man of La Mancha, and Sweeney Todd: The Demon Barber of Fleet Street. For his role in Show Boat, he was nominated for a Tony Award in 1994. Jacoby acted in the original productions of Elf: The Musical and Ragtime and portrayed The Wizard of Oz in the touring production of Wicked. In 2022, Jacoby started playing Neil Diamond (Now) in the new musical A Beautiful Noise, The Neil Diamond Musical. In 2023, he reprised his role of the Father in Ragtime in a concert version.

Jacoby has appeared in episodes of Law & Order, As the World Turns, The Blacklist, and others. Jacoby portrayed Supreme Court Chief Justice Warren Burger in the 2017 film The Post and Hershel Jick in the 2021 miniseries Dopesick.

== Filmography ==
=== Film ===
Year	Title	Role	Notes
2006	The Night Listener	Male Realtor	
2013	The Scene: An Exploration of Music in Toronto	—N/a	Documentary
2017	The Post	Warren Burger	
2019	The Assistant	Dad	Voice

=== Television ===
Year	Title	Role	Notes
1987	The Smithsonian Salutes Disney Music	Singer	Television film
1997–2002	Law & Order	Mr. Milford / Douglas Stark / Ryan	3 episodes
2002	Ed	Moustache Guy	Episode: "Things To Do Today"
2003, 2016	Law & Order: Special Victims Unit	Judge Stephen Kerry / Phillip Dutton	2 episodes
2008	As the World Turns	Trip Baker	Episode #1.13195
2015	Elementary	Lawyer	Episode: "All My Exes Live in Essex"
2017	The Blacklist	John Tadsen	Episode: "The Apothecary (No. 59)"
2017	Madam Secretary	Jacob Barker	Episode: "Minefield"
2018	The Good Fight	News Panel Commentator	Episode: "Day 415"
2019	The Marvelous Mrs. Maisel	Professor Lerman	Episode: "Marvelous Radio"
2021	Dopesick	Hershel Jick	Episode: "Pseudo-Addiction"
2022	Mike	Vince Fuller	Episode: "Desiree"

== Stage credits ==
Year	Title	Role	Notes
1973	The Student Prince	Ensemble u/s Prince Karl Franz, Detlef	US National Tour
1978	Brigadoon	Tommy Albright	Carousel Dinner Theater
1979	Shenandoah	Jacob Anderson	Paper Mill Playhouse
1979-1980	The Student Prince	Prince Karl Franz	Darien Dinner Theatre
1980	Carousel	Billy Bigelow	Coachlight Dinner Theatre
1980-1981	Show Boat	Gaylord Ravenal	Darien Dinner Theatre
1982	Guys and Dolls	Sky Masterson	Melody Top Theatre
1983	Oliver!	Bill Sikes	Heinz Hall
1983	Show Boat	Gaylord Ravenal	Heinz Hall
1983	The Pirates of Penzance	The Pirate King	Heinz Hall
1983	South Pacific	Lt. Joseph Cable, USMC	Brunswick Music Theatre
1984	Show Boat	Gaylord Ravenal	North Shore Music Theatre
1985	Evita	Che	Candlelight Dinner Playhouse
1985	Sweet Charity	Vittorio Vidal	Orpheum Theatre
1986-1987	Sweet Charity	Vittorio Vidal	Minskoff Theatre, Broadway
1987	Sweet Charity	Vittorio Vidal	US National Tour
1988	The Mystery of Edwin Drood	Mr. Clive Paget / John Jasper	US National Tour
1988-1989	My Fair Lady	Professor Henry Higgins	An Evening Dinner Theatre
1989	The King and I	The King of Siam	Maine State Music Theatre
1989-1990	Grand Hotel	s/b Colonel Doctor Otternschlag s/b General Director Preysing s/b Saxonia Mills s/b Felix Von Gaigern	Martin Beck Theatre, Broadway
1989-1990	Grand Hotel	Felix Von Gaigern	Martin Beck Theatre, Broadway
1990-1991	The Phantom of the Opera	The Phantom of the Opera	US National Tour
1991-1993	The Phantom of the Opera	The Phantom of the Opera	Majestic Theatre, Broadway
1993-1994	Show Boat	Gaylord Ravenal	Toronto Centre for the Arts
1994-1995	Show Boat	Gaylord Ravenal	Gershwin Theatre, Broadway
1996	Show Boat	Gaylord Ravenal	US National Tour
1996-1997	Ragtime	The Father	Toronto Centre for the Arts
1997-1999	Ragtime	The Father	Lyric Theatre, Broadway
1999	On the Twentieth Century	Oscar Jaffee	Goodspeed Opera House
1999	1776	John Dickinson	The Muny
2000	You Can't Take It with You	Mr. Kirby	Pittsburgh Public Theater
2001	A Tale of Two Cities	Doctor Manette	Helen Hayes Performing Arts Center
2001	South Pacific	Emile de Becque	Artpark
2001	The Visit	The Mayor	Goodman Theatre
2002	Man of La Mancha	The Padre	National Theatre
2002-2003	Man of La Mancha	The Padre	Martin Beck Theatre, Broadway
2004	Leading Ladies	Duncan Wooley	Cleveland Play House
2005-2006	Sweeney Todd: The Demon Barber of Fleet Street	Judge Turpin	Eugene O'Neill Theatre, Broadway
2006-2007	42nd Street	Julian Marsh	Walnut Street Theatre
2007	A Little Night Music	Fredrik Egerman	South Coast Repertory
2008	The Visit	The Mayor	Signature Theatre
2008	Sweeney Todd: The Demon Barber of Fleet Street	Sweeney Todd	Wells Fargo Pavilion
2008	State Fair	Abel Frake	Walnut Street Theatre
2009	A Little Night Music	Fredrik Egerman	White Plains Performing Arts Center
2010	La Cage aux Folles	Georges	Maltz Jupiter Theatre
2010	Fiddler on the Roof	Tevye	Walnut Street Theatre
2010-2011	Elf	Walter Hobbs	Al Hirschfeld Theatre, Broadway
2011-2012	Wicked	The Wonderful; Wizard of Oz	US National Tour
2012-2013	Elf	Walter Hobbs	Al Hirschfeld Theatre, Broadway
2013	Secondhand Lions	Hub	5th Avenue Theatre
2013	Elf	Walter Hobbs	Sarofim Hall
2014	How to Succeed in Business Without Really Trying	J.B. Biggley	Walnut Street Theatre
2016	The Hunchback of Notre Dame	Dom Claude Frollo	Wells Fargo Pavilion
2018	Parade	Old Confederate Soldier / Judge Leonard Roan	Roundabout Theatre Company Workshop
2022	A Beautiful Noise	Neil Diamond (Now)	Emerson Colonial Theatre
2022-2023	A Beautiful Noise	Neil Diamond (Now)	Broadhurst Theatre, Broadway
2023	Ragtime	The Father	Minskoff Theatre, Broadway
2023-2024	A Beautiful Noise	Neil Diamond (Now)	Broadhurst Theatre, Broadway
2025-2026	Chess	Florence’s Father	Imperial Theatre, Broadway

== Personal life ==
After studying voice and theater at East Tennessee State University, Florida State University and Georgia State University, Jacoby earned a degree from St. John's University School of Law, though he never worked full-time as an attorney. He has been a resident of Maplewood, New Jersey.
