= Wild at Heart (Neil Diamond album) =

Studio album by Neil Diamond
- Released: May 8, 2026
- Recorded: 2007
- Length: 32:16
- Labels: Capitol; UMe
- Producer: Rick Rubin

Neil Diamond chronology
Melody Road (2014)	Wild at Heart (2026)

Wild at Heart is the 33rd studio album by American singer-songwriter Neil Diamond. The final chapter in a trilogy of album collaborations with producer Rick Rubin, it was recorded in 2007 during the sessions for Diamond's 2008 album Home Before Dark. It was released on Capitol Records/UME on May 8, 2026.

Wild at Heart consists of ten previously unreleased tracks. Like Home Before Dark and 12 Songs, Diamond's 2005 collaboration with Rubin, the production on Wild at Heart is stripped-down. The instrumentation is mainly acoustic, with Mike Campbell, Smokey Hormel, Matt Sweeney and Diamond on guitar, and Benmont Tench on keyboards.

Revised for release in 2026, Wild at Heart was called "both a memento from Diamond's late-career resurgence and a twilit reminder of his vitality as an artist".

== Track listing ==
All tracks are written by Neil Diamond.

No.	Title	Length
1.	"Wild at Heart"	2:56
2.	"You Can’t Have It All"	2:57
3.	"Talking It to Death"	3:10
4.	"Shine On"	2:51
5.	"The Secret You"	2:33
6.	"You Never Know"	3:33
7.	"You're Getting to Me"	3:17
8.	"You Still Look Good to Me"	4:11
9.	"You're My Favorite Song"	3:21
10.	"Forgotten"	3:27
Total length:		32:16

== Personnel ==
Musicians

- Neil Diamond – vocals, guitar
- Mike Campbell – guitar
- Matt Sweeney – guitar
- Smokey Hormel – guitar, baritone guitar
- Benmont Tench – keyboards

Production

- Rick Rubin – producer
- Sam Cole – project coordinator

Engineering

- Andrew Scheps – engineer
- Greg Fidelman – engineer
- Bernie Becker – engineer, mixing, mastering
- Dale Becker – mastering
- Chris Holmes – assistant engineer
- Jim Monti – assistant engineer
- Phillip Broussard Jr. – assistant engineer

Artwork

- Martyn Atkins – photography, cover art, back cover
- Todd Gallopo – art direction, design

== Charts ==
Chart performance for Wild at Heart
Chart (2026)	Peak position
Australian Albums (ARIA)	29
Austrian Albums (Ö3 Austria)	25
Belgian Albums (Ultratop Flanders)	15
Belgian Albums (Ultratop Wallonia)	91
Dutch Albums (Album Top 100)	20
French Rock & Metal Albums (SNEP)	41
German Albums (Offizielle Top 100)	32
German Pop Albums (Offizielle Top 100)	17
Scottish Albums (Official Charts)	9
Swiss Albums (Schweizer Hitparade)	21
UK Albums (Official Charts)	61
UK Americana Albums (Official Charts)	2
US Top Album Sales (Billboard)	10
