= I'll Come Running (Neil Diamond song) =

1966 song by Neil Diamond

Single by Neil Diamond

from the album The Feel of Neil Diamond
- A-side: "Cherry, Cherry"
- Released: July 1966
- Recorded: 1966
- Genre: Pop rock
- Length: 3:00
- Label: Bang
- Songwriter: Neil Diamond
- Producers: Jeff Barry; Ellie Greenwich

Neil Diamond singles chronology
"Solitary Man" (1966)	"I'll Come Running" (1966)	"I Got the Feelin' (Oh No No)" (1966)

"I'll Come Running" is a song written by Neil Diamond. It was first released by Diamond in July 1966 as the B-side to his US top-ten single "Cherry, Cherry", before being included on his debut album The Feel of Neil Diamond, released in August 1966. The song was later covered by Cliff Richard and released as a single in June 1967; it peaked at number 26 in the UK Singles Chart.

== Cliff Richard version ==
"I'll Come Runnin'"
- Cover of the single released in the Netherlands

Single by Cliff Richard
- B-side: "I Get the Feelin'"
- Released: 2 June 1967
- Recorded: 24 April 1967
- Studio: EMI Studios, London
- Genre: Pop rock; blue-eyed soul
- Length: 2:27
- Label: Columbia
- Songwriter: Neil Diamond
- Producer: Norrie Paramor

Cliff Richard singles chronology
"It's All Over" (1967)	"I'll Come Runnin'" (1967)	"The Day I Met Marie" (1967)

=== Release and reception ===
"I'll Come Runnin'" was arranged by and features the orchestra of Mike Leander. It was released with the B-side "I Get the Feelin'", which was also written by Diamond and originally titled "I Got the Feelin' (Oh No No)". It had been released as the follow-up single to "Cherry, Cherry" in October 1966. Richard would also go on to record covers of other Diamond songs, "Solitary Man" and "Girl You'll Be a Woman Soon".

Reviewing for New Musical Express, Derek Johnson wrote that the song "starts quietly with a rippling Mike Leander accompaniment. Then it explodes into a pulsating chorus, with blaring brass, chirping girls and Cliff in his most rhythmic mood". He also liked "the light and shade of this disc – the contrast between the delicately-scored verses and the punchy attack of the chorus. Quite a whistleable tune, too". For Record Mirror, Peter Jones described "I'll Come Runnin'" as "a mixture of soft vocal and rip-roaring rocking – and the arrangement is tremendous".

=== Track listing ===
7": Columbia / DB 8210

1. "I'll Come Runnin'" – 2:27
2. "I Get the Feelin'" – 2:17

=== Charts ===
Chart (1967)	Peak position
Australia (Kent Music Report)	69
Malaysia (Radio Malaysia)	4
Netherlands (Dutch Top 40)	31
New Zealand (Listener)	10
Rhodesia (Lyons Maid)	1
Singapore (Radio Singapore)	3
UK Singles (OCC)	26
