= The Feel of Neil Diamond =

Studio album by Neil Diamond
- Released: August 12, 1966
- Recorded: 1965–66
- Genre: Pop rock
- Length: 29:51
- Label: Bang
- Producers: Jeff Barry, Ellie Greenwich

Neil Diamond chronology
The Feel of Neil Diamond (1966)	Just for You (1967)

Singles from The Feel of Neil Diamond
- 1. "Solitary Man" Released: April 4, 1966; 2. "Cherry, Cherry" Released: July 1966; 3. "Oh No No" Released: 1966

The Feel of Neil Diamond is Neil Diamond's debut album, released on Bang Records in the US, London Records in the UK, and Stateside Records in Australia. It includes his first three big hits, "Solitary Man" (#55), "Cherry, Cherry" (#6), and "Oh No No" (#16). Artie Butler was the arranger and conductor; Leonard Linton was the photographer; and Jeff Barry and Ellie Greenwich, continuing to work together although they had divorced the previous year, were the producers.

The photo for this album cover was taken under the Brooklyn Bridge by Diamond's first cousin Len Rapoport, who was 17 years old when these photos were taken. The photo credit on this album shows "Photo by Leonard Linton", which was Rapoport's middle name. He wasn't sure if he should take a professional name at that time, but later photo credits reverted to his name Leonard Rapoport. His photo credits can be found on many of the Diamond Program Books, albums and other Diamond publications.

This album has never been released on CD, but the CD The Bang Years 1966–1968 includes all the tracks from this album and from Diamond's second album, Just for You.

The Australian version has two additional tracks: "The Boat that I Row" and "Thank the Lord for the Night Time".

Professional ratings
Review scores
Source	Rating
Allmusic	link

== Track listing ==
All songs written by Neil Diamond, except where noted.

Side one
No.	Title	Writer(s)	Track position on The Bang Years	Length
1.	"Solitary Man"		1	2:32
2.	"Red Rubber Ball"	Bruce Woodley, Paul Simon	13	2:18
3.	"La Bamba"	Ritchie Valens	15	2:07
4.	"Do It"		10	1:57
5.	"Hanky Panky"	Jeff Barry, Ellie Greenwich	21	2:44
6.	"Monday, Monday"	John Phillips	12	2:56

Side two
No.	Title	Writer(s)	Track position on The Bang Years	Length
1.	"New Orleans"	Frank Guida, Joseph Royster	11	2:24
2.	"Someday Baby"		20	2:18
3.	"Oh No No"		17	2:13
4.	"I'll Come Running"		14	2:55
5.	"Love to Love"		19	2:18
6.	"Cherry, Cherry"		2	2:42
Total length:				29:51

== Charts ==
Chart (1966)	Peak position
US Billboard 200	137
