= Hershel Jick =

American physician (1931–2023)

- Born: December 1, 1931
- Died: October 16, 2023 (aged 91)

Academic background
- Education: Harvard University (MD)

Academic work
- Discipline: Medicine
- Sub-discipline: Pharmacology; Pharmaceutical research
- Institutions: Boston University

Hershel M. Jick (December 1, 1931 – October 16, 2023) was an American medical researcher and associate professor of medicine at Boston University School of Medicine, where he was the director of the Boston Collaborative Drug Surveillance Program.

== Education ==
Jick graduated from Harvard Medical School in 1956 and completed an internal medicine residency and clinical pharmacology fellowship.

== Career ==
Jick is known for researching the negative and positive effects of pharmaceutical drugs. A 1977 study by him and his assistant Jane Porter reported that no more than one patient per 3,600 died because of incorrect drug prescriptions. In 1980, Jick and Porter published the letter "Addiction Rare in Patients Treated with Narcotics", which has been cited to argue that opioids are rarely addictive. Jick has said that this study had multiple limitations, such as that it only pertained to patients in the hospital, and did not assess the risk of addiction when opioids were prescribed in outpatient settings. The "Porter–Jick study" was mentioned in the Hulu miniseries Dopesick and Jick was portrayed by theatre actor Mark Jacoby.

Outside of medicine, Jick was the author of the book A Listener's Guide to Mozart's Music.

== Death ==
Jick died on October 16, 2023, at the age of 91.
