= Katie McNeil Diamond =

American talent manager (born 1970)

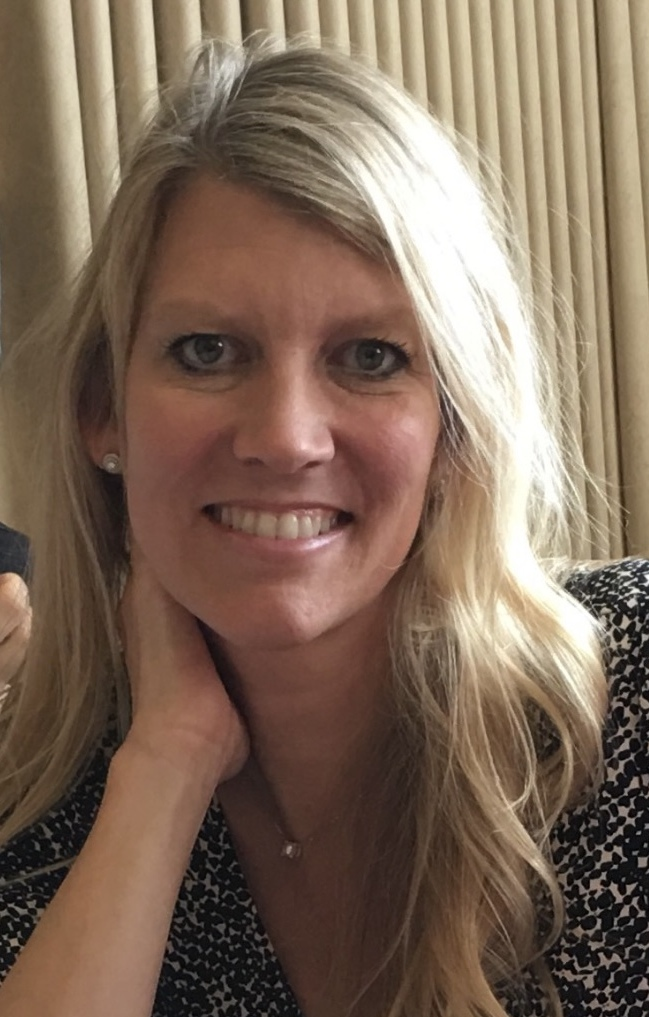
- McNeil Diamond in 2022
- Born: Kathryn McNeil; March 16, 1970 (age 56); Smithtown, New York, U.S.
- Education: University at Albany, SUNY
- Occupations: Talent manager, producer
- Years active: 1993–present
- Spouse: Neil Diamond (m. 2012)

Katie McNeil Diamond (née McNeil; born March 16, 1970) is an American talent manager and long-form music video and concert documentary producer.

== Early life and education ==
McNeil was born and raised in Smithtown, New York. She was a horseback rider as a child, and rode competitively throughout high school. She attended University at Albany, SUNY, graduating in 1993 with a degree in communication.

== Career ==
McNeil began her career as an intern at MTV and later served as executive producer of television and home video at House of Blues Entertainment. In 2003 she accepted a job at 10th Street Entertainment and transitioned to artist management. As an artist manager and the head of media at 10th Street, she worked with artists including Mötley Crüe, Blondie, Hanson and Buckcherry. In 2007 she starred as herself—a "ball busting exec"—on the VH1 reality show, Mission: Man Band.

McNeil was hired as a manager at Azoff Entertainment in 2007. In addition to working with Guns N' Roses, 30 Seconds to Mars, and other artists, she co-managed Neil Diamond with Irving Azoff. She lobbied Azoff to work with Diamond, stating in a 2012 interview that professionally, managing Diamond would be a "feather in her cap." Diamond and McNeil began dating in 2009, and in 2011 Diamond announced he and McNeil were engaged. They were married the following year. She has managed Diamond's career since 2012.

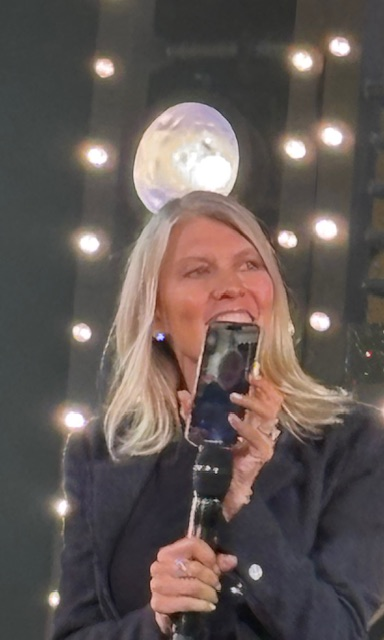

McNeil Diamond played a central role in the creation of A Beautiful Noise, the 2022 Broadway musical about Diamond's life. At the premiere of Song Sung Blue—a 2025 film that documents the true story of Claire and Mike Sardinas, who formed a Diamond tribute band—director Craig Brewer thanked McNeil Diamond, stating: "We owe this whole movie to her love and support.”

== Personal life ==
McNeil and Diamond live primarily in Beverly Hills, California, and New York City. Active in animal rescue, she is an equestrian and a wildlife photographer.

== Selected videography ==
Year	Project	Artist	Credit
2001	Live from the House of Blues	Public Enemy	Executive producer
2003	Lewd, Crüed & Tattooed	Mötley Crüe	Executive producer
2003	Alive in Seattle	Heart	Executive producer
2004	Underneath Acoustic	Hanson	Executive producer
2005	Carnival of Sins - Live	Mötley Crüe	Executive producer
2007	Return from Bangleonia	The Bangles	Producer
2009	Hot August Night/NYC	Neil Diamond	Executive producer
