= Heartlight (song) =

Single by Neil Diamond

from the album Heartlight
- B-side: "You Don't Know Me"
- Released: September 1982
- Recorded: February 4, 1982
- Studio: Ocean Way Recording (Hollywood, California)
- Genre: Pop
- Length: 4:25
- Label: Columbia
- Songwriters: Neil Diamond; Carole Bayer Sager; Burt Bacharach
- Producers: Neil Diamond; Carole Bayer Sager; Burt Bacharach

Neil Diamond singles chronology
"Be Mine Tonight" (1982)	"Heartlight" (1982)	"I'm Alive" (1983)

"Heartlight" is a song written by Neil Diamond, Carole Bayer Sager and her then-husband, Burt Bacharach, and recorded by Diamond in 1982. It is the first track on Diamond's 1982 album, also titled Heartlight, and reached number five on the Billboard Hot 100, becoming his thirteenth (and last) top 10 hit on the chart. It also spent four weeks atop the adult contemporary chart in late 1982, and was the last of his eight #1s on that chart. Reportedly, it was inspired by the 1982 film E.T. the Extra-Terrestrial, and Diamond allegedly settled with MCA/Universal for $25,000, due to its supposedly drawing on the material of the film.

Cash Box said that the song "will unquestionably stick in the minds of adult pop and A/C listeners like a piece of ear candy." Billboard described it as a "pretty, romantic ballad with a light, lilting melodyline."

== Personnel ==
- Burt Bacharach – orchestra arrangements and conductor
- Paulinho da Costa – percussion
- Neil Diamond – lead vocals, guitar (uncredited)
- David Foster – keyboards
- Craig Hundley – synthesizer
- Jim Keltner – drums
- Richard Page – backing vocals
- Linda Press – backing vocals
- Stephanie Spruill – backing vocals
- Neil Stubenhaus – bass guitar
- Julia Waters Tillman – backing vocals
- H.L. Voelker – backing vocals
- Marty Walsh – guitar
- Maxine Waters Willard – backing vocals
- Frank DeCaro - music contractor/ album supervisor

== Chart performance ==
=== Weekly charts ===
Chart (1982–83)	Peak position
Australia	29
Belgium	23
Canada RPM Top Singles	6
Canadian RPM Adult Contemporary	1
Ireland (IRMA)	21
UK	47
US Billboard Hot 100	5
US Billboard Adult Contemporary Tracks	1
US Cash Box Top 100	10

=== Year-end charts ===
Chart (1982)	Rank
Australia	177
Canada	55
U.S. (Joel Whitburn's Pop Annual)	34
U.S. Cash Box	67

== See also ==
- List of number-one adult contemporary singles of 1982 (U.S.)
