= Dreams (Neil Diamond album) =

Studio album by Neil Diamond
- Released: November 2, 2010
- Genres: Pop, rock, country pop, country rock
- Length: 54:57
- Label: Columbia
- Producer: Neil Diamond

Neil Diamond chronology
A Cherry Cherry Christmas (2009)	Dreams (2010)	All-Time Greatest Hits (2014)

Professional ratings
Review scores
Source	Rating
Allmusic	3/5 stars

Dreams is the thirty-first studio album by Neil Diamond. It was produced by Diamond and released by Columbia Records in 2010. The album contains cover versions of popular songs that Diamond says in the liner notes are among his favorites. Among them is "I'm a Believer", which he wrote for The Monkees back in 1966. Dreams ranked at number eight on the Billboard 200 chart.

== Track listing ==
No.	Title	Writer(s)	Length
1.	"Ain't No Sunshine"	Bill Withers	3:37
2.	"Blackbird"	John Lennon, Paul McCartney	3:22
3.	"Alone Again (Naturally)"	Gilbert O'Sullivan	3:57
4.	"Feels Like Home"	Randy Newman	4:51
5.	"Midnight Train to Georgia"	Jim Weatherly	5:00
6.	"I'm a Believer"	Neil Diamond	4:27
7.	"Love Song"	Lesley Duncan	3:57
8.	"Losing You"	Randy Newman	3:16
9.	"Hallelujah"	Leonard Cohen	4:10
10.	"A Song for You"	Leon Russell	4:31
11.	"Yesterday"	John Lennon, Paul McCartney	3:31
12.	"Let It Be Me"	Gilbert Bécaud, Manny Curtis, Pierre Delanoë	3:19
13.	"Desperado"	Glenn Frey, Don Henley	3:36
14.	"Don't Forget Me"	Harry Nilsson	3:23

== Personnel ==
- Neil Diamond – lead vocals, guitars
- Alan Lindgren – acoustic piano, Hammond B3 organ, arrangements
- Tom Hensley – acoustic piano, horn arrangements (14)
- Benmont Tench – acoustic piano (11)
- Hadley Hockensmith – guitars
- Reinie Press – bass guitar
- King Errisson – percussion
- Gabe Witcher – fiddle (2)
- Tommy Morgan – harmonica (5)
- Don Markese – alto saxophone, baritone saxophone, tenor saxophone, clarinet
- Larry Klimas – tenor saxophone, flute
- Andrew Klein – bassoon
- Robert Shulgold – flute
- Joseph Stone – oboe
- Arturo Velasco – trombone, bass trombone
- John Fumo – trumpet, flugelhorn
- Joseph Meyer – French horn
- Assa Drori – concertmaster
- Timothy B. Schmit – harmony vocals (4)

== Production ==
- Producer – Neil Diamond
- Production Coordinator – Sam Cole
- Recorded, Mixed and Mastered by Bernie Becker
- Mastering Assistant – Dale Becker
- Recorded at Arch Angel Studios (Los Angeles, CA) and Eastwest Studios (Hollywood, CA).
- Mixed at Arch Angel Studios
- Mastered at Bernie Becker Mastering
- Art Direction and Design – Glen Nakasako at SMOG Design, Inc. (Los Angeles, CA).
- Photography – Jesse Diamond and Frank Ockenfels

== Charts ==
=== Weekly charts ===
Chart (2010)	Peak position
Australian Albums (ARIA)	5
Austrian Albums (Ö3 Austria)	31
Belgian Albums (Ultratop Flanders)	50
Dutch Albums (Album Top 100)	12
German Albums (Offizielle Top 100)	51
Irish Albums (IRMA)	28
New Zealand Albums (RMNZ)	5
Scottish Albums (Official Charts)	7
Spanish Albums (Promusicae)	42
Swiss Albums (Schweizer Hitparade)	53
UK Albums (Official Charts)	8
US Billboard 200	8
US Indie Store Album Sales (Billboard)	21

=== Year-end charts ===
Chart (2010)	Position
Australian Albums (ARIA)	91
UK Albums (OCC)	129

== Certifications ==
Region	Certification	Certified units/sales
United Kingdom (BPI)	Gold	100,000^{^}
^{^} Shipments figures based on certification alone.
