= Heartlight (album) =

Studio album by Neil Diamond
- Released: August 27, 1982
- Recorded: 1982
- Studios: Ocean Way Recording (Hollywood, California); A&M Studios (Hollywood); The Village Recorder (Los Angeles, California); Evergreen Studios (Burbank, California); The Mix Room (Burbank)
- Genre: Pop
- Length: 40:15
- Label: Columbia
- Producers: Neil Diamond; Carole Bayer Sager; Burt Bacharach; Tom Hensley; Richard Bennett; Michael Masser; David Foster

Neil Diamond chronology
On the Way to the Sky (1981)	Heartlight (1982)	Classics: The Early Years (1983)

Singles from Heartlight
- 1. "Heartlight" Released: August 1982; 2. "I'm Alive" Released: January 1983; 3. "Front Page Story" Released: April 1983

Heartlight is the fifteenth studio album by Neil Diamond. It was released in August 1982 on Columbia Records. The album spent 34 weeks on the charts and peaked at #9. For shipments of a million copies it was certified Platinum by the RIAA.

The title track, reportedly inspired by the 1982 film E.T. the Extra-Terrestrial, peaked at #5 on the Billboard Hot 100 and #1 on the Hot Adult Contemporary Tracks chart in late 1982, while "I'm Alive" reached #35 on the Hot 100 in early 1983. The song "Lost Among The Stars" has co-writer Burt Bacharach reproducing his melody from his hit "Trains and Boats and Planes" from 17 years prior.

The album was the last of a decade-long streak of Platinum albums by Diamond—he would not have another platinum album certified until his first Christmas album in the 1990s—and his last top 10 album for a decade. The song "Heartlight" was Diamond's last top 10 pop hit and also his last #1 on the Adult Contemporary chart, while "I'm Alive" was his last top 40 hit. While Diamond continued having some success and periodic hits, and some television specials and film appearances, the period after Heartlight did not have for him the same level of sales, notoriety or fame that the preceding times did.

Billboard described "I'm Alive" as "a paean to dogged optimism" and said that "Handclaps and familiar chord changes recall the good old days of [Diamond's] earliest pop hits."

== Track listing ==
All songs written by Neil Diamond, Burt Bacharach and Carole Bayer Sager, except where noted.

No.	Title	Writer(s)	Length
1.	"Heartlight"		4:25
2.	"I'm Alive"	Diamond, David Foster	3:47
3.	"I'm Guilty"		3:15
4.	"Hurricane"		4:15
5.	"Lost Among the Stars"		3:54
6.	"In Ensenada"		3:49
7.	"A Fool for You"	Tom Hensley, Alan Lindgren	3:02
8.	"Star Flight"	Hensley, Lindgren	3:50
9.	"Front Page Story"		4:29
10.	"Comin' Home"	Diamond	2:34
11.	"First You Have to Say You Love Me"	Diamond, Michael Masser	2:45

== Personnel ==
Musicians and vocalists

- Neil Diamond – vocals
- David Foster – electric piano (1), Fender Rhodes (3)
- Craig Hundley – synthesizers (1, 4, 6)
- Tom Hensley – acoustic piano (2, 5, 7, 8, 10), keyboards (2, 5, 7, 8, 10)
- Alan Lindgren – acoustic piano (2, 5, 7, 8), synthesizers (2, 5, 7, 8)
- Burt Bacharach – acoustic piano (3, 5, 9)
- Michael Omartian – acoustic piano (4)
- Michael Lang – acoustic piano (6), Fender Rhodes (9)
- Michael Masser – acoustic piano (11)
- Marty Walsh – guitars (1, 4), acoustic guitar (9)
- Richard Bennett – acoustic guitar (2, 5, 7, 8, 10), electric guitar (2, 5, 7, 8, 10)
- Doug Rhone – acoustic guitar (2, 5, 7, 8, 10), electric guitar (2, 5, 7, 8, 10)
- Dean Parks – guitars (3, 4), electric guitar (6, 9)
- Lee Ritenour – guitars (4)
- Fred Tackett – acoustic guitar (6)
- Neil Stubenhaus – bass guitar (1, 3, 4, 6, 9, 11)
- Reinie Press – bass guitar (2, 5, 7, 8, 10)
- Jim Keltner – drums (1, 3, 4, 6, 9)
- Ron Tutt – drums (2, 5, 7, 8, 10)
- Alex Acuña – drums (4)
- Mike Baird – drums (11)
- Paulinho da Costa – percussion (1, 4, 6)
- Vince Charles – percussion (2, 5, 7, 8, 10)
- King Errisson – percussion (2, 5, 7, 8, 10)
- Victor Feldman – percussion (9)
- David Boruff – alto saxophone (3), Steinerfone (5)
- Clydene Jackson – backing vocals
- Richard Page – backing vocals
- Stephanie Spruill – backing vocals
- Julia Tillman Waters – backing vocals
- Maxine Waters Willard – backing vocals

Music arrangements

- Burt Bacharach – arrangements and conductor (1, 3–6, 9)
- Alan Lindgren – arrangements and conductor (2), arrangements (8)
- Jeremy Lubbock – arrangements and conductor (11)
- Michael Masser – arrangements (11)

Additional music credits

- Assa Drori, Endre Granat, Jeremy Lubbock, Sid Sharp and Gerald Vinci – concertmasters
- Jules Chaikin, Frank DeCaro and John Rosenberg – music contractors

== Production ==
- Neil Diamond – producer (1–6, 8–10)
- Carole Bayer Sager – producer (1–6, 9)
- Burt Bacharach – producer (1–6, 9)
- Tom Hensley – producer (7, 8)
- Richard Bennett – producer (10)
- Michael Masser – producer (11)
- Dick Bogart – recording, mixing
- Joel Fein – recording
- Lee Herschberg – recording
- Ron Hitchcock – mixing
- Ric Riccio – recording, mixing
- Bill Schnee – recording
- Allen Sides – recording, mixing
- Jeremy Smith – recording, mixing
- Michael Carver – assistant engineer
- Tony Chiappa – assistant engineer
- Steve Crimmel – assistant engineer
- Mark Ettel – assistant engineer
- Mike Hatcher – assistant engineer
- Clif Jones – assistant engineer
- Clyde Kaplan – assistant engineer
- Greg Russell – assistant engineer
- Mike Reese – mastering at The Mastering Lab (Hollywood, California)
- Ann Mooney – production assistant
- Alison Zanetos – production assistant
- Sam Cole – production coordinator
- David Kirschner – art direction, design
- Jan Weinberg – design contributing
- Tom Bert – photography

== Charts ==
=== Weekly charts ===
Chart (1982–1983)	Peak position
Australian Albums (Kent Music Report)	8
Canada Top Albums/CDs (RPM)	13
Dutch Albums (Album Top 100)	25
New Zealand Albums (RMNZ)	37
Norwegian Albums (VG-lista)	39
UK Albums (Official Charts)	43
US Billboard 200	9

=== Year-end charts ===
Chart (1983)	Position
US Billboard 200	58

== Certifications ==
Region	Certification	Certified units/sales
Australia (ARIA)	Platinum	50,000^{^}
United States (RIAA)	Platinum	1,000,000^{^}
^{^} Shipments figures based on certification alone.
