= Melody Road =

Studio album by Neil Diamond
- Released: October 21, 2014
- Recorded: 2012–2014
- Studio: Archangel Recording
- Genres: Pop; folk
- Label: Capitol
- Producers: Jacknife Lee; Don Was

Neil Diamond chronology
| All-Time Greatest Hits (2014) | Melody Road (2014) | Acoustic Christmas (2016) |

Melody Road is the 30th studio album by American singer-songwriter Neil Diamond, released in 2014. It was his first album of original music recorded since 2008's Home Before Dark, which debuted on the US album charts at number one. Melody Road was produced by Don Was and Jacknife Lee.

After 40 years recording solo for Columbia (Capitol had released Diamond's 1980 soundtrack album for The Jazz Singer.), Diamond signed with Capitol Records in early 2014. At the same time, his back catalogue was moved to Universal Music Group, Capitol's parent company.

On September 8, 2014, six of the tracks from Melody Road were premiered at the Capitol Records studios in Hollywood, CA at a listening party for a small group of music industry executives and journalists. Following the event, Billboard wrote that the album is "rich in orchestration that retains the dark rustic qualities of his last two studio albums of original material, 12 Songs and Home Before Dark." Of the songs, the article stated that "'Something Blue', the most commercial of the songs played Monday, has the classic Diamond mid-tempo lilt; the ballads 'The Art of Love' and '(Ooo) Do I Wanna Be Yours' offer springboards for Diamond's still-potent voice; and 'Seongah and Jimmy' is an eyewitness account of a romance between a woman from Korea and a man from Long Island." The Wall Street Journal wrote that "The Art of Love" is a "tender offering from Diamond, who at age 73, hasn't lost that ability to convey a wide swath of emotions in just four minutes."

In September, three videos from the album were released. A lyric video for "The Art of Love" debuted on Diamond's YouTube/VEVO channel, and the video for the album's first single, "Something Blue", premiered on Yahoo! Music. Rolling Stone debuted the video for "Nothing But a Heartache".

== Reception ==
Professional ratings
Review scores
| Source | Rating |
|---|---|
| AllMusic | 4/5 stars |
| Billboard | 3/5 stars |
| The Guardian | 3/5 stars |
| Mojo | 3/5 stars |
| Rolling Stone | 3.5/5 stars |

The album received generally favorable reviews. Ann Powers of NPR wrote: "This is music with (as one song title says) a sunny disposition, expressing Diamond's resilient faith in the power of both romance and the balladry that enhances it. 'Still remember the first word you wrote, in every single note that you play,' he declares in "First Time," a joyful remembrance of musical beginnings that recalls one of the singer's own early hits, "I'm a Believer." Diamond's ability to do that, to be in the moment while knowing just what makes his long career special, keeps him vital. Few could navigate this road with so much panache."

In October 2014, Melody Road debuted at number three on the Billboard charts, selling 78,000 copies in the first week. The album has sold 235,000 copies in the United States as of September 2016.

== Track listing ==
All tracks are written by Neil Diamond, except where noted.

| No. | Title | Length |
|---|---|---|
| 1. | "Melody Road" | 3:12 |
| 2. | "First Time" | 4:02 |
| 3. | "Seongah and Jimmy" | 5:44 |
| 4. | "Something Blue" | 4:03 |
| 5. | "Nothing But a Heartache" | 4:33 |
| 6. | "In Better Days" | 3:30 |
| 7. | "(Ooo) Do I Wanna Be Yours" | 6:14 |
| 8. | "Alone at the Ball" | 2:56 |
| 9. | "Sunny Disposition" | 3:14 |
| 10. | "Marry Me Now" | 3:35 |
| 11. | "The Art of Love" | 4:07 |
| 12. | "Melody Road (reprise)" | 1:12 |
| Total length: | | 46:22 |

Target deluxe edition (bonus tracks)
| No. | Title | Length |
|---|---|---|
| 13. | "Remember" (Harry Nilsson) | 3:31 |
| 14. | "Something" (George Harrison) | 4:10 |
| Total length: | | 54:03 |

== Personnel ==
- Neil Diamond – vocals, guitar
- Jim Cox, Rami Jaffee, Greg Phillinganes, Matt Rollings, Benmont Tench, C.J. Vanston, Don Was – keyboards
- Jacknife Lee – keyboards, guitar
- Richard Bennett, Mark Goldenberg, Hadley Hockensmith, Smokey Hormel, Greg Leisz, Blake Mills, Tim Pierce – guitar
- James "Hutch" Hutchinson, Sebastian Steinberg – bass guitar
- Jeremy Stacey – drums
- Joey Waronker – drums, percussion
- Alan Estes – percussion
- Sara Andon, Don Markese – flute
- Davide Rossi – strings (11), string arrangements (11)
- Julia Waters – backing vocals
- Maxine Waters – backing vocals
- Oren Waters – backing vocals

Horns (Tracks 3, 4 & 10)

- Eric Gorfain – arrangements
- Mark Bolin
- Mike Cottone
- John Fumo
- Justin Hageman
- Stephanie O'Keefe
- Dan Weinstein
- Jamelle Williams

Strings (Tracks 3 & 5)

- Alan Lindgren – arrangements and conductor)
- Assa Drori – concertmaster
- Erik Avinder (3)
- Robert Berg (3, 5)
- Chuck Berghofer (3, 5)
- Sally Berman (3, 5)
- Caroline Buckman (3, 5)
- Phillippa Ruth Clarke-Ling (5)
- Giovanna Clayton (3, 5)
- Matthew Cooker (3)
- Marcia Dickstein (5)
- Andrew Duckles (3, 5)
- Alan Estes (5)
- Michael Ferril (3, 5)
- Alex Gorlovsky (3, 5)
- Agnes Gottschewski (5)
- Lynn Grants (3, 5)
- Maurice Grants (3, 5)
- Sarkis Gyurgchyan (5)
- Vahe Hayrikian (5)
- Norman Hughes (3, 5)
- Carrie Kennedy (5)
- Ovsep Ketendjian (3, 5)
- Anna Kostyucheck (3)
- Johana Krejci (3)
- Gayle Levant (3)
- Marina Manukian (3)
- Dennis Molchan (3, 5)
- Karolina Naziemiec (3, 5)
- Cheryl Norman (5)
- Aaron Oltman (5)
- Joel Pargman (3, 5)
- Steve Richards (3, 5)
- Anatoly Rosinsky (3)
- Jody Rubin (3, 5)
- Harry Shirinian (3)
- Christina Soule (3, 5)
- David Stone (3, 5)
- Kevan Torfeh (3, 5)
- Elizabeth Wilson (3, 5)
- Zhou Yi (3, 5)
- Shari Zippert (3, 5)

=== Production ===
- Producers – Jacknife Lee and Don Was
- Recorded by Tom McFall
- Recording assistants – Matt Bishop, Pablo Hernandez and Kyle Stevens
- Strings and vocals recorded by Bernie Becker
- Mixed by Bob Clearmountain at Mix This! (Los Angeles, California), assisted by Sergio Rueles
- Mastered by Bernie Becker at Bernie Becker Mastering (Pasadena, California), assisted by Dale Becker
- Art direction – Todd Gallopo
- Design – Todd Gallopo and Leslie Kim
- Studio photography – Jesse Diamond and Todd Gallopo
- Cover portrait photo – Micah Diamond
- Cover, background and package photos – Al Michaelson
- Liner notes – Julie Farman

== Charts ==
=== Weekly charts ===
| Chart (2014) | Peak position |
|---|---|
| Australian Albums (ARIA) | 8 |
| Austrian Albums (Ö3 Austria) | 25 |
| Belgian Albums (Ultratop Flanders) | 17 |
| Belgian Albums (Ultratop Wallonia) | 62 |
| Dutch Albums (Album Top 100) | 11 |
| German Albums (Offizielle Top 100) | 24 |
| Irish Albums (IRMA) | 8 |
| New Zealand Albums (RMNZ) | 21 |
| Scottish Albums (Official Charts) | 2 |
| Spanish Albums (Promusicae) | 61 |
| Swiss Albums (Schweizer Hitparade) | 40 |
| UK Albums (Official Charts) | 4 |
| US Billboard 200 | 3 |
| US Indie Store Album Sales (Billboard) | 7 |

=== Year-end charts ===
| Chart (2014) | Position |
|---|---|
| Australian Albums (ARIA) | 80 |
| UK Albums (OCC) | 40 |
| US Billboard 200 | 153 |

== Certifications ==
| Region | Certification | Certified units/sales |
|---|---|---|
| Australia (ARIA) | Gold | 35,000^{^} |
| United Kingdom (BPI) | Gold | 100,000^{*} |
^{*} Sales figures based on certification alone.^{^} Shipments figures based on certification alone.
