= The Boat That I Row =

Single by Lulu
- B-side: "Dreary Days And Nights"
- Released: April 7, 1967
- Label: Columbia DB 8169
- Songwriter: Neil Diamond
- Producer: Mickie Most

"The Boat That I Row" is a song written by Neil Diamond. It was first released as the flip-side of his top 20 US hit "I Got the Feelin' (Oh No No)" in 1966 and was later included on his album Just For You. In 1967, it was recorded as a single by Lulu, reaching the top 10 of the UK Singles Chart.

== History ==
By April 29, 1967, Billboard recorded the track's UK chart position at 33, having been at 46 the previous week. Spending a total of 11 weeks on the UK chart, it peaked at #6 on 11 May 1967. It failed to crack the top 100 in the US, stalling at number 115. It reached No. 1 in Canada Oct 7, 1967, for one week.

== Charts ==
Chart performance for "The Boat That I Row" by Lulu
Chart (1967)	Peak position
Malaysia (Radio Malaysia)	8
New Zealand (Hit Parade)	9
UK Singles Chart	6
