= Thank the Lord for the Night Time =

- German 7″ vinyl single cover

Single by Neil Diamond

from the album Just for You
- B-side: "The Long Way Home"
- Released: July 1967
- Genre: Pop rock
- Length: 2:55
- Label: Bang
- Songwriter: Neil Diamond
- Producers: Ellie Greenwich, Jeff Barry

Neil Diamond singles chronology
"Girl, You'll Be a Woman Soon" (1967)	"Thank the Lord for the Night Time" (1967)	"Kentucky Woman" (1967)

"Thank the Lord for the Night Time" is a song written and performed by Neil Diamond. It reached No. 13 on the U.S. pop chart in 1967 and appeared on his 1967 album Just for You. as its closing track.

"Thank the Lord for the Night Time" was produced by Ellie Greenwich and Jeff Barry.

Billboard said the song has a "strong dance beat in strong support of Diamond's top vocal work." Cash Box said that it's a "driving, thumping, rhythmic, pounding venture" that "is likely to get a lot of exposure." It ranked No. 100 on Billboard magazine's Top 100 singles of 1967.

== Other charting versions ==
- Charlie Major released his take on the song as a single in 1998 which reached No. 48 on the Canadian chart. It was featured on his 1997 album Everything's Alright.

== Other Uses ==
On season 7 of American Idol, Syesha Mercado sang this song.
