= Shilo (song) =

Single by Neil Diamond

from the album Just for You
- B-side: "La Bamba"
- Released: 1970
- Genre: Soft rock
- Length: 3:27
- Label: Bang Records
- Songwriter: Neil Diamond
- Producers: Jeff Barry, Ellie Greenwich

Neil Diamond singles chronology
"Holly Holy" (1969)	"Shilo" (1970)	"Until It's Time for You to Go" (1970)

"Shilo" is a song written and recorded by Neil Diamond. It was originally recorded in 1967 for Bang Records. Though not one of Diamond's biggest hits, "Shilo" has become one of his best-known songs, and was a staple of his concert appearances. It was included on Diamond's 1972 Hot August Night live album as well as almost all of his compilation albums.

== Background ==
Neil Diamond and Bang founder Bert Berns disagreed over Diamond's career path. The singer wanted to move away from his early teen-oriented pop type of recordings that Berns favored, which led to Berns' refusal to release the more introspective "Shilo" as a single, even though Diamond felt it was part of his development as an artist. "Shilo" was instead relegated to an album track on 1967's Just for You. Shortly after what was said to be a "tense" confrontation with Berns, Diamond left Bang for Uni Records in 1968. Diamond went into a commercial slump, without hits, but by January 1970, his career had rebounded with "Sweet Caroline" and "Holly Holy" on Uni/MCA Records. Bang Records finally released "Shilo" as a single, albeit with a new backing track recorded to make it sound fresher and more like Diamond's current style.

Following this, Diamond reissued his 1968 debut album with Uni, Velvet Gloves and Spit, in October 1970, to incorporate a completely new recording of "Shilo". "Shilo" is about a childhood imaginary friend:

Shilo, when I was young —
I used to call your name
When no one else would come,
Shilo, you always came
And we'd play ...

The song was Diamond's most autobiographical to date, making reference to his lonely childhood amid turmoil. Diamond's emotional investment in the song contributed to his and Berns's coming into intense conflict. Decades later, Rolling Stone compared the song's posture to the emo style. Cash Box called it a "hitting rhythm number with lover’s lyric."

== Chart performance ==
"Shilo" reached #24 on the U.S. pop singles chart in spring 1970, inspiring Bang to release a new Neil Diamond compilation album that year titled Shilo. It reached #8 on the Easy Listening chart, and peaked at #10 in South Africa.

Chart (1970)	Peak position
South Africa	10
US Billboard Easy Listening	8
US Billboard Hot 100	24

== Uses in popular culture ==
- It appears in the 2013 film Anchorman 2: The Legend Continues.
- Shilo Dortmund, the protagonist in Andre Norton and Jean Rabe's fantasy novel Dragon Mage, was named after the song by her Neil Diamond-fan parents.
- The song is used in the Disney+ series The Mysterious Benedict Society in the episode "The Art of Conveyance and Round-Trippery".
- The song also appears during episode eight of the series Good American Family.
