= Cherry, Cherry =

- Single cover artwork for the 1973 live version

Single by Neil Diamond

from the album The Feel of Neil Diamond
- B-side: "I'll Come Running"
- Released: July 1966
- Recorded: February – March 1966
- Genre: Garage rock; folk rock; pop rock
- Length: 2:39 (studio single)
- Label: Bang
- Songwriter: Neil Diamond
- Producers: Jeff Barry, Ellie Greenwich

Neil Diamond singles chronology
"Solitary Man" (1966)	"Cherry, Cherry" (1966)	"I Got the Feelin' (Oh No, No)" (1966)

"Cherry, Cherry" is a 1966 song written and recorded by American musician Neil Diamond.

== Background ==
The song was recorded in February - March 1966, and was originally intended as a demo, arranged by Artie Butler and produced by Jeff Barry and Ellie Greenwich. It was issued as a 45 single in 1966 where Greenwich came up with the chorus and can be heard as the prominent background voice, accompanied by Jeff Barry. Diamond has stated that the song was inspired by an early relationship with a significantly older woman. Rolling Stone would later label "Cherry, Cherry" as "one of the greatest three-chord songs of all time".

== Reception ==
Billboard described the single as an "exciting production [which] features bass piano backing and choral support of Diamond's vocal work." Cash Box said that it is a "lively, pulsating chorus-backed romancer with an infectious repeating riff" that is a "sure-fire blockbuster". Record World called it "groovy", saying that "nifty piano and guitar backing will get teeny hoppers dancing."

== Chart performance ==
"Cherry, Cherry" was Diamond's first big hit, reaching No. 6 on both the Billboard Hot 100 chart, in October 1966, and the Cash Box chart. In 1973, a live recording of "Cherry, Cherry" was issued as a 45 single from Diamond's live album Hot August Night (1972). The live version hit No. 24 on the Cash Box chart and No. 31 on the Billboard Hot 100 chart. Billboard said that "the live sound and the bouncing arrangement makes it almost a different song" from the original studio version.
