= Kentucky Woman =

1967 single by Neil Diamond

Single by Neil Diamond
- B-side: "The Time Is Now"
- Released: October 1967
- Genre: Pop, country
- Length: 2:34
- Label: Bang
- Songwriter: Neil Diamond
- Producers: Jeff Barry; Ellie Greenwich

Neil Diamond singles chronology
"Thank the Lord for the Night Time" (1967)	"Kentucky Woman" (1967)	"Some Day Baby" (1967)

"Kentucky Woman" is a 1967 song written and originally recorded by Neil Diamond.

== Background ==
Diamond recorded "Kentucky Woman" as his last hit single for Bang Records. The song was mixed in monophonic, which is the common version heard on all Neil Diamond compilations featuring original Bang singles. The only known stereo mix was done in 1978 for a Frog King/Columbia House album called Early Classics, which has never been released on CD.

== Chart history ==
Released in October 1967, it reached number 22 on the U.S. pop singles chart, number 58 on the Australian charts, and number 6 on the Canadian charts.

Chart (1967–68)	Peak position
Australia (Kent Music Report)	58
Canada RPM Top Singles	29
New Zealand (Listener)	10
US Billboard Hot 100	22
US Cash Box Top 100	12

== Deep Purple version ==
"Kentucky Woman"

Single by Deep Purple

from the album The Book of Taliesyn
- B-side: "Wring That Neck"
- Released: October 1968
- Recorded: August 1968
- Genre: Psychedelic pop; hard rock
- Length: 3:57
- Label: Parlophone; Tetragrammaton
- Songwriter: Neil Diamond
- Producer: Derek Lawrence

Deep Purple singles chronology
"Hush" (1968)	"Kentucky Woman" (1968)	"River Deep Mountain High" (1968)

Audio sample
- file; help

Another well-known version is the 1968 recording by Deep Purple. The group's cover had vastly different instrumental feel, if not vocal line. It was their second single release in 1968. It managed to reach #38 on the Billboard Hot 100, #21 Canadian RPM charts, and #27 on the Australian Singles Chart where it was released as a double A-Side with "Hush."

The single version is an edit of the album version and runs 4:04. Cash Box said that it has a "heavy dance beat and a splendid instrumental burst". A remastered version appears on the two-CD 30th anniversary album 30: Very Best of Deep Purple and runs 4:43. Both those versions end on a fadeout. The album version, which does not fade out at the end, runs 5:31.

Deep Purple played "Kentucky Woman" live on tour in 1968 and 1969, even after Ian Gillan and Roger Glover joined the band in the summer of 1969. It has never been on Deep Purple's set list since. The song was also featured in Quentin Tarantino's 2019 film and soundtrack for Once Upon a Time in Hollywood.

== Other notable versions ==
- Waylon Jennings also released a version on his 1968 album, Only the Greatest.
- Gary Puckett & The Union Gap also released a version in 1968 on their debut album Woman, Woman (Gary Puckett & The Union Gap album).
- Diamond re-recorded the song for his 1996 country album Tennessee Moon. He performed the song with Jennings on a TV special to promote the album.
