= Bang Records =

Defunct American record label

- Parent company: Sony Music
- Founded: 1965
- Founder: Bert Berns
- Defunct: 1982
- Distributors: Atlantic Records (1965-66) independent (1966-78); CBS Records (1979-82)
- Country of origin: United States
- Location: New York City, New York

Bang Records was created by Bert Berns in 1965 together with his partners from Atlantic Records: Ahmet Ertegun, Nesuhi Ertegun and Jerry Wexler. The first letters of their names (Bert, Ahmet, Nesuhi, Gerald) formed the label's name.

== Forming the company ==
Berns had been staff producer at Atlantic Records for several years when he and Atlantic chief executives set out to create a new independent label. In 1966, Berns took sole control of the company. At Bang he had an immediate string of hit records, including "I Want Candy" by the Strangeloves, "Hang On Sloopy" by the McCoys, "Brown Eyed Girl" by Van Morrison and "Solitary Man" and "Kentucky Woman" by Neil Diamond.

== Death of Berns ==
When Berns died suddenly on December 30, 1967, as a result of a rheumatic heart condition, his wife Ilene Berns took over management. She believed that arguments with Van Morrison had been the cause of her husband's death, and made things difficult for the Irish artist until Warner Brothers managed to untangle him from his Bang contract, though with some awkward conditions, such as giving Bang three original recordings a month for a year. According to Van Morrison the tension arose because of the contract he signed with Bang Records without legal advice. Morrison states that he has never received any royalties for writing or recording "Brown Eyed Girl". Others in the industry blame arguments, artistic differences and the ultimate loss of Neil Diamond, who was Bang's biggest artist. Diamond has said his departure from Bang had been over his direction as an artist, and away from his early "teenybopper" type of recordings that Berns favored, which led to his refusal to release the more introspective "Shilo" as a single, even though Diamond felt it was part of his development as an artist. In 1968, shortly after what was said to be a "tense" confrontation with Berns, Diamond departed Bang for Uni/MCA Records. By 1970, a few years after Berns' death, Diamond had racked up a few hits on the Uni subsidiary of MCA. That year Bang finally released "Shilo" as a single, which promptly hit the Top 40 charts. Berns' young widow signed singer/songwriter Paul Davis, who had a number of hit records in the 1970s and 1980s, including "Ride 'Em Cowboy", "I Go Crazy", "Sweet Life" and "Do Right". Ilene Berns also signed and developed R&B acts Brick ("Dazz") and Peabo Bryson. Also in 1970 she hired promotion man Eddie Biscoe to help run Bang. They eventually married.

== Development of the label ==
In 1971, Ilene moved Bang's base of operations from New York City to Atlanta, Georgia. In the early years Bang did its own distribution. In 1979 Bang was sold to CBS Records, and kept its identity as part of the CBS Associated unit until it was absorbed in 1982 by CBS' Columbia Records unit. Over the years two subsidiary labels were started: Shout Records and Bullet Records. While Sony Music owns the Bang Records catalog today, the Berns family still owns the music publishing operations. In 1979, Columbia Records turned over control of Diamond's Bang master recordings to the artist himself, at the time one of the label's hottest stars, who has remixed and re-released them several times over the years and these masters are now owned by Capitol Records. Peabo Bryson was the only artist who released an album with Bullet. His recordings with Bullet are now owned by Capitol Records.

== Revival attempt ==
Ilene Berns attempted to revive the Bang label as Bang II Records in the late 1990s under Sony Music Entertainment. Only two recordings were released: Monty Holmes' All I Ever Wanted and Sleepy's Theme's The Vinyl Room.

== Bang Records artists ==
- Paul Davis
- Neil Diamond
- The Lost Souls
- The McCoys
- Van Morrison
- Nigel Olsson
- The Strangeloves
- Brick
- Peabo Bryson
- Derek

== See also ==
- List of record labels
