= Neil Diamond =

American singer-songwriter (born 1941)

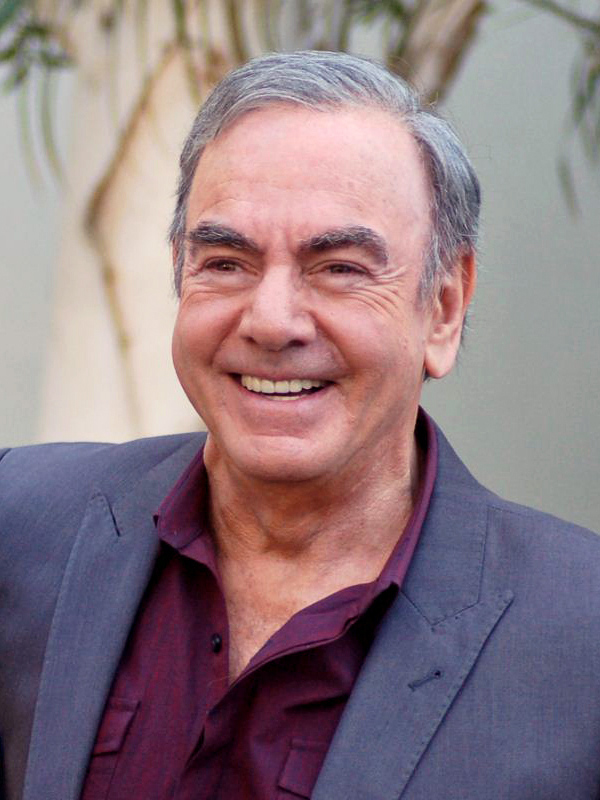
- Diamond in 2012
- Born: Neil Leslie Diamond; January 24, 1941 (age 85); New York City, U.S.
- Occupations: Singer; musician; songwriter
- Years active: 1962–present
- Spouses: Jaye Posner (m. 1963; div. 1969); Marcia Murphey (m. 1969; div. 1996) (Note: Sources variously list the marriage as ending in 1994 or 1995.); Katie McNeil (m. 2012)
- Children: 4
- Musical career
- Genres: Pop; rock; soft rock; country
- Instruments: Vocals; guitar
- Works: Discography
- Labels: Bang; Uni; MCA; Columbia; Capitol (US); Virgin EMI (UK)
- Website: neildiamond.com

Neil Leslie Diamond (born January 24, 1941) is an American singer-songwriter. He has sold more than 56.5 million records in the US alone, making him one of the best-selling musicians in history.

Diamond has written and recorded ten singles that reached No. 1 on the U.S. Billboard Hot 100 and Adult Contemporary charts: "Cracklin' Rosie", "Song Sung Blue", "Longfellow Serenade", "I've Been This Way Before", "If You Know What I Mean", "Desirée", "You Don't Bring Me Flowers" (co-written with Alan and Marilyn Bergman, performed with Barbra Streisand), "America", "Yesterday's Songs", and "Heartlight (co-written with Carole Bayer Sager and Burt Bacharach). Thirty-eight songs by Diamond have reached the top 10 on the Billboard Adult Contemporary chart, including "Sweet Caroline". On screen, he starred in the 1980 musical drama The Jazz Singer.

Diamond was inducted into the Songwriters Hall of Fame in 1984 and into the Rock and Roll Hall of Fame in 2011. He received a Sammy Cahn Lifetime Achievement Award in 2000. In 2011, he was an honoree at the Kennedy Center Honors, and he received the Grammy Lifetime Achievement Award in 2018.

== Early life and education ==
Diamond was born in Brooklyn, New York City, to a Jewish family. All four of his grandparents were immigrants: his father's side came from Poland, while his mother's side were born in Kyiv, modern-day Ukraine, which was then part of the Russian Empire. His parents were Rose (née Rapoport; 1918–2019) and Akeeba "Kieve" Diamond (1917–1985), a dry-goods merchant. Diamond grew up in several homes in Brooklyn, and also spent four years in Cheyenne, Wyoming, while his father was stationed there in the army from 1945 until 1949.

In Brooklyn, he attended Erasmus Hall High School for two years, where he was a member of the Freshman Chorus and Choral Club, alongside his classmate Barbra Streisand. Diamond recalled that they were not close friends at the time, saying, "We were two poor kids in Brooklyn. We hung out in the front of Erasmus High and smoked cigarettes." Their class also included chess grandmaster Bobby Fischer. After his family moved to Brighton Beach in 1956, Diamond attended Abraham Lincoln High School where he joined the fencing team. Also on the team was his best friend, future Olympic fencer Herb Cohen.

For his 16th birthday, Diamond received his first guitar. While still in high school at the age of 16, he spent several weeks at Surprise Lake Camp, a camp for Jewish children in upstate New York. During his time there, folk singer Pete Seeger performed a small concert. Witnessing Seeger perform and seeing the other children sing their own songs for him had a profound impact on Diamond. It made him realize that he could write his own songs too. He recalled, "And the next thing, I got a guitar when we got back to Brooklyn, started to take lessons and almost immediately began to write songs". He noted that his passion for songwriting became his "first real interest" while growing up, as it allowed him to express his youthful "frustrations".

Diamond found that composing poems for the girls to whom he was attracted in school often won their hearts. His male classmates noticed this and started asking him to write poems for them as well, which they would sing to similar success. After graduating from high school, he spent the summer working as a waiter in the Catskills resort area, where he first met Jaye Posner, who would later become his wife.

Diamond then attended New York University as a pre-med major on a fencing scholarship, again on the fencing team with Herb Cohen. (Note: His first life ambition was medicine, as he once told talk show host Larry King, "I actually wanted to be a laboratory biologist. I wanted to study. And I really wanted to find a cure for cancer. My grandmother had died of cancer. And I was always very good at the sciences. And I thought I would go and try and discover the cure for cancer.") He was a member of the 1960 NCAA men's championship fencing team. Often bored in class, he found writing song lyrics more to his liking. He began cutting classes and taking the train up to Tin Pan Alley, where he tried to get some of his songs heard by local music publishers. In his senior year, when he was ten units short of graduation, Sunbeam Music Publishing offered him a 16-week job writing songs for $50 a week (equivalent to about $540 per week in 2025), and he dropped out of college to accept it. (Note: Thirty-five years later, in 1995, New York University gave him an honorary degree. Later in his career, he said, "If this darn songwriting thing hadn't come up, I would have been a doctor now.")

== Career ==
=== 1960s ===
Diamond was not rehired after his sixteen weeks with Sunbeam, and he began writing and singing his own songs for demos. "I never really chose songwriting", he says. "It just absorbed me and became more and more important in my life." His first recording contract was billed as "Neil and Jack", an Everly Brothers-type duet with high school friend Jack Packer. They recorded the unsuccessful singles "You Are My Love at Last" with "What Will I Do", and "I'm Afraid" with "Till You've Tried Love", both records released in 1962.

Cashbox and Billboard magazines gave all four sides positive reviews, and Diamond signed with Columbia Records as a solo performer later in 1962. In July 1963, Columbia released the single "Clown Town" / "At Night"; Billboard gave a laudatory review to "Clown Town", and Cashbox was complimentary to both sides, but it still failed to make the charts. Columbia dropped him from their label, and he went back to writing songs in and out of publishing houses for the next seven years.

Diamond wrote wherever he could, including on buses, and used an upright piano above the Birdland Club in New York City. One of the causes of this early nomadic life as a songwriter was his songs' wordiness: "I'd spent a lot of time on lyrics, and they were looking for hooks, and I didn't really understand the nature of that", he says. He was able to sell only about one song a week during those years, barely enough to survive. He found himself only earning enough to spend 35 cents a day on food, equivalent to $4 in 2025.

The privacy that he had above the Birdland Club allowed him to focus on writing without distractions. "Something new began to happen. I wasn't under the gun, and suddenly interesting songs began to happen, songs that had things none of the others did." Among them were "Cherry, Cherry" and "Solitary Man". "Solitary Man" was the first record that Diamond recorded under his own name which made the charts. It remains one of his personal favorites, as it was about his early years as a songwriter, even though he failed to realize it at the time. He describes the song as "an outgrowth of my despair".

Diamond spent his early career in the Brill Building. His first success as a songwriter came in November 1965 with "Sunday and Me", a Top 20 hit for Jay and the Americans. Greater success followed with "I'm a Believer"; "A Little Bit Me, a Little Bit You"; "Look Out (Here Comes Tomorrow)"; and "Love to Love", all performed by the Monkees. He wrote and recorded the songs for himself, but the other versions were released before his own. The unintended consequence was that Diamond began to gain fame as a songwriter. "I'm a Believer" became a gold record within two days of its release and stayed at the top of the charts for seven weeks, making it the Popular Music Song of the Year in 1966.

"And the Grass Won't Pay No Mind" brought renditions from Elvis Presley (who also interpreted "Sweet Caroline") and Mark Lindsay, former lead singer for Paul Revere & the Raiders. Other notable artists who recorded his early songs were Lulu, Cliff Richard and the English hard-rock band Deep Purple. (Note: Richard released versions of "I'll Come Running", "Solitary Man", "Girl, You'll Be a Woman Soon", "I Got the Feelin' (Oh No No)", and "Just Another Guy".)

In 1966, Diamond signed a deal with Bert Berns's Bang Records, then a subsidiary of Atlantic. His first release on that label was "Solitary Man", which was his first true hit as a solo artist. (Note: Prior to the release of "Solitary Man", he had considered using a stage name; he came up with "Noah Kaminsky" and "Eice Charry". Bang Records asked him which name to use, and he thought of his grandmother, who had died prior to the release of "Solitary Man"; he told Bang to "go with 'Neil Diamond' and I'll figure it out later.") Diamond followed with "Cherry, Cherry" and "Kentucky Woman". His early concerts featured him opening for bands such as Herman's Hermits and the Who. He was shocked to see Pete Townshend swinging his guitar like a club and then throwing it against walls and off the stage until the instrument's neck broke.

Diamond began to feel restricted by Bang Records because he wanted to record more ambitious, introspective music, such as "Brooklyn Roads", starting in 1968. Berns wanted to release "Kentucky Woman" as a single, but Diamond was no longer satisfied writing simple pop songs, so he proposed "Shilo" about an imaginary childhood friend. Bang believed that the song was not commercial enough, so it was relegated to being an LP track on Just for You. Diamond was also dissatisfied with his royalties and tried to sign with another record label after discovering a loophole in his contract that did not bind him exclusively to either WEB IV or Tallyrand.

The result was a series of lawsuits that coincided with a slump in his record sales and professional success. A magistrate refused WEB IV's request for a temporary injunction to prevent Diamond from joining another record company while his contract dispute continued in court. The lawsuits persisted until February 1977, when he triumphed in court and purchased the rights to his Bang-era master tapes.

In March 1968, Diamond signed a deal with Uni Records; the label was named after Universal Pictures, the owner of which, MCA Inc., later consolidated its labels into MCA Records (now called Universal Music after merging with PolyGram in 1999). His debut album for Uni/MCA was in late 1968 with Velvet Gloves and Spit, produced by Tom Catalano, which did not chart, and he recorded the early 1969 follow-up Brother Love's Traveling Salvation Show at American Sound Studios in Memphis with Tommy Cogbill and Chips Moman producing.

=== 1970s ===
In mid 1969, Diamond moved to Los Angeles. His sound mellowed with such songs as "Sweet Caroline" (1969), "Holly Holy" (1969), "Cracklin' Rosie" (1970) and "Song Sung Blue" (1972), the last two reaching No. 1 on the Hot 100. "Sweet Caroline" was Diamond's first major hit after his slump. In 2007, Diamond said he had written "Sweet Caroline" for Caroline Kennedy after seeing her on the cover of Life in an equestrian riding outfit, but in 2014 he said in an interview on the Today show that it was written for his then wife, Marcia. He could not find a good rhyme with the name "Marcia" and so used the name Caroline. It took him just one hour in a Memphis hotel to write it. The 1971 release "I Am...I Said" was a Top 5 hit in both the US and UK and was his most intensely personal effort to date, taking over four months to complete.

In 1971, Diamond played seven sold-out concerts at the Greek Theater in Los Angeles. The outdoor theater, which was noted for showcasing the best of current entertainers, added a stereo sound system for the first time. Diamond was also backed by a 35-piece string orchestra and six backing singers. After the first night, one leading newspaper called it "the finest concert in Greek Theater history."

I have a love-hate relationship with songwriting. I love it because it's so satisfying...when it works. I hate it because it forces you to dig inside yourself. It is without question the most difficult thing I do.

Performing, on the other hand, is the most joyful and happiest thing I do. The bigger the audience the more anticipation, the more excitement.

— Neil Diamond, 1977

In August 1972, he played again at the Greek, this time doing ten shows. When the show was first announced, tickets at the 5000-seat theater sold out rapidly. He added a quadraphonic sound system for his performance to create full surround sound. The performance of August 24, 1972, was recorded and released as the live double album Hot August Night. Diamond recalled: "Hot August Night captures a very special show for me. We went all out to really knock 'em dead in LA."

Many consider it his best work; critic Stephen Thomas Erlewine called Hot August Night "the ultimate Neil Diamond record... [showing] Diamond the icon in full glory." The album became a classic, and was remastered in 2000 with additional selections. In Australia, which at the time was said to have the most Neil Diamond fans per capita of any country, the album ranked No. 1 for 29 weeks and stayed in their top 20 bestsellers for two years.

In the fall of 1972, Diamond performed for 20 consecutive nights at the Winter Garden Theater in New York City. That theater had not staged a one-man show since Al Jolson in the 1930s. The approximately 1,600-seat Broadway venue provided an intimate concert setting not common at the time, with every performance reportedly sold out. It also made Diamond the first rock-era star to headline on Broadway. The review in The New York Times stated:

Neil Diamond's one-man show seemed, on the face of it, to be a brash idea. One-man shows have traditionally been associated with talents like Judy Garland and Danny Kaye. But Mr. Diamond is clearly a brash young man and one with both the musical track record and the performance macho to bring it off...He needn't worry about comparisons with the likes of Garland and Kaye.

After the Winter Garden shows, Diamond announced that he needed a break, and he engaged in no live performances until 1976. He used those four years to work on the score for Hall Bartlett's film version of Richard Bach's Jonathan Livingston Seagull and to record two albums, Serenade and Beautiful Noise. He said years later, "I knew I'd come back, but I wasn't sure when. I spent one year on each of those albums...I'd been on the road six years. I had a son 2½ and I felt he needed me more than the audience did. So for four years I devoted myself to my son Jesse." He also said he needed to get back to having a private life, one where he could be anonymous.

In 1973, Diamond switched labels again, returning to Columbia Records for a million-dollar-advance-per-album contract, about $7.3 million per album in 2025. His first project, released as a solo album, was the soundtrack to Jonathan Livingston Seagull. The film received hostile reviews and did poorly at the box office, and the album grossed more than the film did.

Richard Bach, author of the best-selling source story, disowned the film. He and Diamond sued Bartlett for different reasons. Bach felt the film omitted too much from the original novella, whereas Diamond believed the film had butchered his score. "After 'Jonathan,'" Diamond declared, "I vowed never to get involved in a movie again unless I had complete control." Bartlett angrily responded to Diamond's lawsuit by criticizing his music as having become "too slick...and it's not as much from his heart as it used to be." Bartlett also added, "Neil is extraordinarily talented. Often his arrogance is just a cover for the lonely and insecure person underneath."

Despite the controversy surrounding the film, the soundtrack was a success, peaking at No. 2 on the Billboard albums chart. Diamond also won a Golden Globe Award for Best Original Score and a Grammy Award for Best Score Soundtrack Album for a Motion Picture. Thereafter, Diamond often included a Jonathan Livingston Seagull suite in his live performances, as he did in his 1976 Love at the Greek concert and for his show in Las Vegas that same year.

Diamond returned to live shows in 1976 with an Australian tour, "The 'Thank You Australia' Concert", which was broadcast to 36 television outlets nationwide. He also again appeared at the Greek Theater in a 1976 concert, Love at the Greek. An album and accompanying video/DVD of the show includes a version of "Song Sung Blue" with duets with Helen Reddy and Henry Winkler.

He began wearing colorful beaded shirts in concert, originally so that everyone in the audience could see him without binoculars. Bill Whitten designed and made the shirts for Diamond from the 1970s until approximately 2007.

In 1974, Diamond released the album Serenade, from which "Longfellow Serenade" and "I've Been This Way Before" were issued as singles. The latter had been intended for the Jonathan Livingston Seagull score, but Diamond had completed it too late for inclusion. That same year he appeared on a TV special for Shirley Bassey and sang a duet with her.

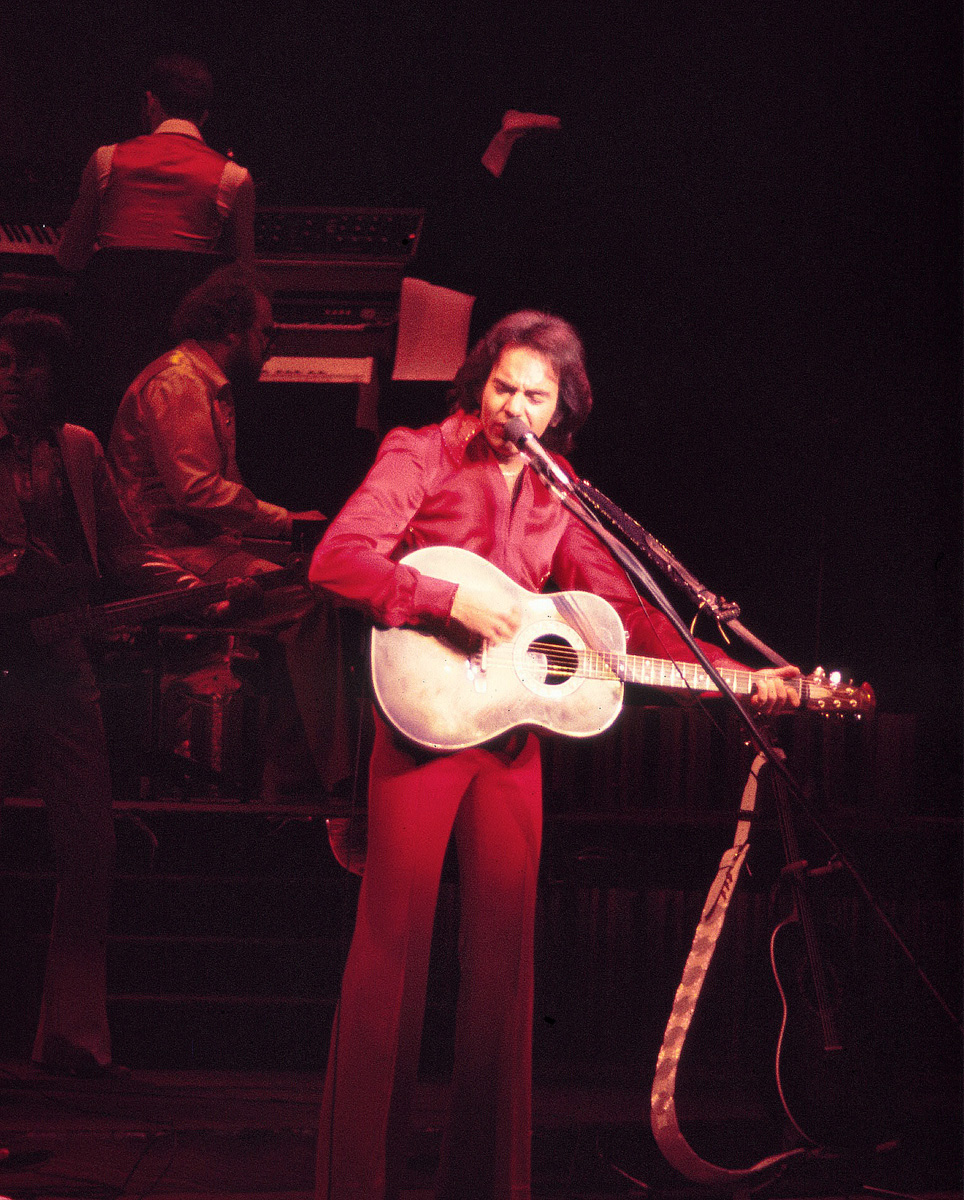
Diamond performing on opening night of the Theatre for the Performing Arts at the Aladdin Hotel & Casino on July 2, 1976

In 1976, he released Beautiful Noise, produced by Robbie Robertson of The Band. On Thanksgiving 1976, Diamond made an appearance at The Band's farewell concert, The Last Waltz, performing "Dry Your Eyes", which he wrote jointly with Robertson, and which had appeared on Beautiful Noise. He also joined the rest of the performers onstage at the end in a rendition of Bob Dylan's "I Shall Be Released".

Diamond was paid $650,000 (about $3.7 million in 2025) by the Aladdin Hotel in Las Vegas, Nevada, to open its new $10 million Theater For the Performing Arts on July 2, 1976. The show played to July 5 and drew sold-out crowds at the 7,500-seat theater. A "who's who" of Hollywood attended opening night, ranging from Elizabeth Taylor to Chevy Chase, and Diamond walked out on stage to a standing ovation. He opened the show with a story about an ex-girlfriend who dumped him before he became successful. His lead-in line to the first song of the evening was, "You may have dumped me a bit too soon, baby, because look who's standing here tonight."

He performed at Woburn Abbey on July 2, 1977, to an audience of 55,000 British fans. The concert and interviews were taped by film director William Friedkin, who used six cameras to capture the performance.

In 1977, Diamond released I'm Glad You're Here with Me Tonight, including "You Don't Bring Me Flowers", for which he wrote the music and collaborated on the lyric with Alan Bergman and Marilyn Bergman. Barbra Streisand recorded the song on her album Songbird, and later, Diamond and Streisand recorded a duet, spurred by the success of radio mash-ups. That version hit No. 1 in 1978, his third song to top the Hot 100. They appeared unannounced at the 1980 Grammy awards ceremony, where they performed the song to a surprised and rapturous audience.

In 1979, Diamond collapsed on stage in San Francisco and was taken to the hospital, where he endured a 12-hour operation to remove what turned out to be a tumor on his spine. He said he had been losing feeling in his right leg "for a number of years but ignored it". When he collapsed, he had no strength in either leg. During the lengthy rehabilitation process before starting principal photography on The Jazz Singer (1980), he was so convinced he would die that he wrote farewell letters to friends.

=== 1980s ===
A planned film version of "You Don't Bring Me Flowers" to star Diamond and Streisand fell through when Diamond instead starred in a 1980 remake of the Al Jolson classic The Jazz Singer alongside Laurence Olivier and Lucie Arnaz. Though the movie received poor reviews, the soundtrack spawned three top-10 singles, "Love on the Rocks", "Hello Again", and "America", the last of which has emotional significance for Diamond. "'America' was the story of my grandparents," he told an interviewer. "It's my gift to them, and it's very real for me ... In a way, it speaks to the immigrant in all of us." The song was performed in full by Diamond during the film's finale. An abbreviated version played over the film's opening titles.

The song was also the one he was most proud of, partly because of when it was later used: national news shows played it when the hostages were shown returning home after the Iran hostage crisis ended; it was played on the air during the 100th anniversary of the Statue of Liberty; and at a tribute to slain civil rights leader Martin Luther King Jr., as well as the Vietnam Vets Welcome Home concert, he was asked to perform it live. At the time, a national poll found the song to be the number-one most recognized song about America, more than "God Bless America". It also became the anthem of his world tour two weeks after the attacks on America on September 11, 2001, when he changed the lyric at the end from; "They're coming to America", to "Stand up for America!" Earlier that year he performed it after a request from former heavyweight champion Muhammad Ali.

The film's failure was due in part to Diamond never having acted professionally before. "I didn't think I could handle it," he said later, seeing himself as "a fish out of water". For his performance, Diamond became the first-ever winner of a Worst Actor Razzie Award, even though he was nominated for a Golden Globe Award for the same role. Critic David Wild noted that the film showed that Diamond was open about his religion: "Who else but this Jewish Elvis could go multi-platinum with an album that featured a version of 'the Kol Nidre?'" Diamond later told the Los Angeles Times, "For me, this was the ultimate bar mitzvah."

Another Top 10 selection, "Heartlight", was inspired by the blockbuster 1982 movie E.T. the Extra-Terrestrial. Though the film's title character is never mentioned in the lyrics, Universal Pictures, which had released E.T. the Extra-Terrestrial and was the parent company of the Uni Records label (by then called MCA Records), for which Diamond had recorded for years, briefly threatened legal action against both Diamond and Columbia Records.

Diamond's record sales slumped somewhat in the 1980s and 1990s, his last single to make the Billboard Pop Singles chart coming in 1986, but his concert tours continued to be big draws. Billboard magazine ranked Diamond as the most profitable solo performer of 1986. He released his 17th studio album in 1986, Headed for the Future, which reached number 20 on the Billboard 200. Three weeks later he starred in Hello Again, his first television special in nine years, performing comedy sketches and a duo medley with Carol Burnett.

In January 1987, Diamond sang the national anthem at the Super Bowl. His "America" became the theme song for the Michael Dukakis 1988 presidential campaign. That same year, British band UB40's reggae interpretation of Diamond's ballad "Red Red Wine" topped the Billboard Pop Singles chart and like the Monkees' version of "I'm a Believer", became better known than Diamond's original version.

=== 1990s ===
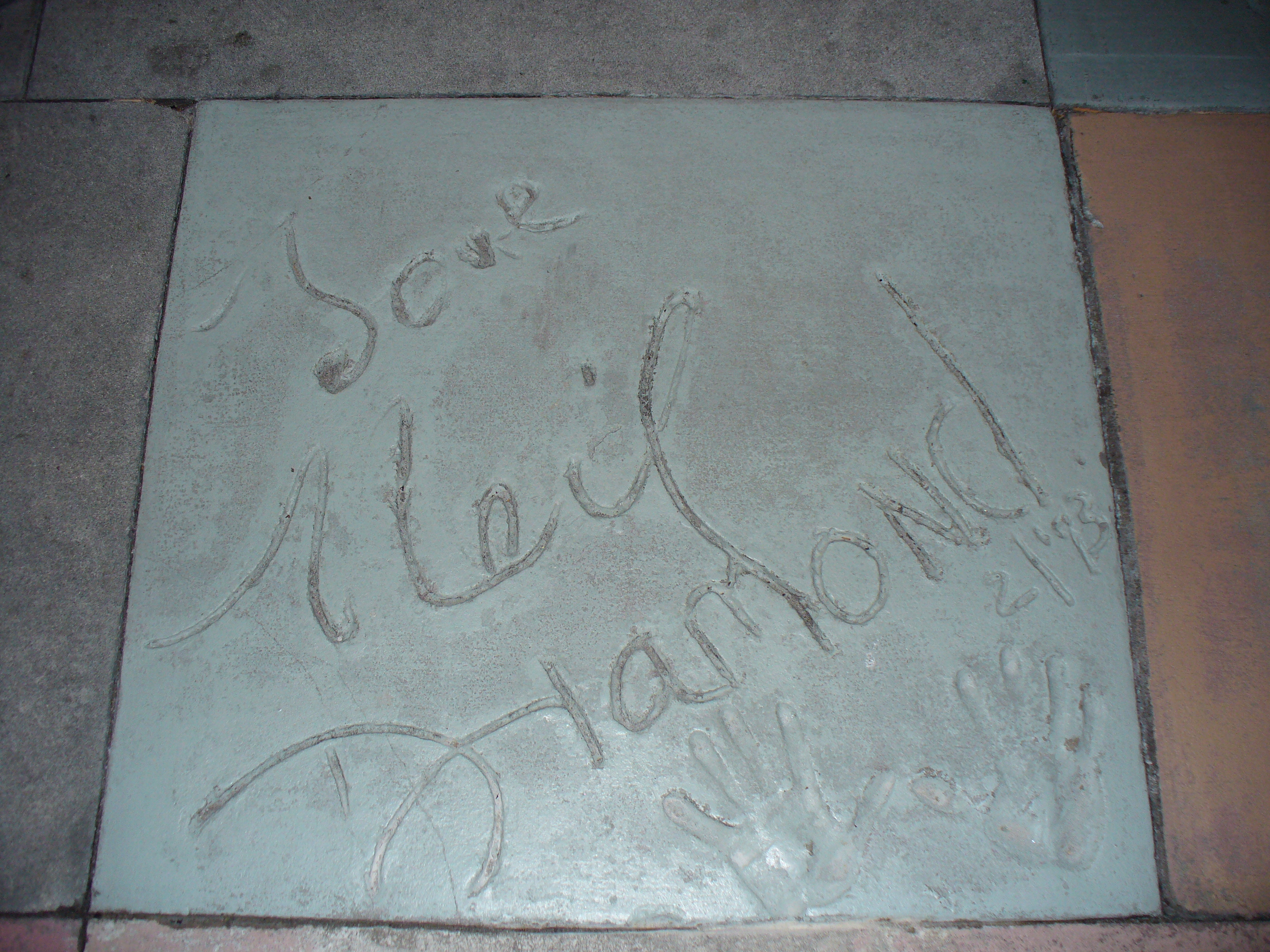
The handprints of Diamond in front of The Great Movie Ride at Walt Disney World's Disney's Hollywood Studios theme park

During the 1990s, Diamond produced six studio albums. He recorded many classic songs from the movies and from famous Brill Building-era songwriters. He also released two Christmas albums, the first of which peaked at No. 8 on Billboard's Album chart. Diamond also recorded two albums of mostly new material during this period. In 1992, he performed for President George H. W. Bush's final Christmas in Washington NBC special. In 1993, Diamond opened the Mark of the Quad Cities (now the Vibrant Arena at The MARK) with two shows on May 27 and 28 to crowds of 10,000 each night..

The 1990s saw a resurgence in Diamond's popularity. "Sweet Caroline" became a popular sing-along at sporting events. It was used at Boston College football and basketball games. College sporting events in other states also played it, and it was even played at sports events in other countries, such as a Hong Kong Sevens rugby tournament or a soccer match in Northern Ireland. It is played at every home game of the Brisbane Broncos of the National Rugby League. In 1997, the Boston Red Sox began playing it at every home game, between the top and bottom of the 8th inning at Fenway Park. (Note: Although Diamond noted that he had been a lifelong fan of the Brooklyn/Los Angeles Dodgers.)

=== 2000s ===
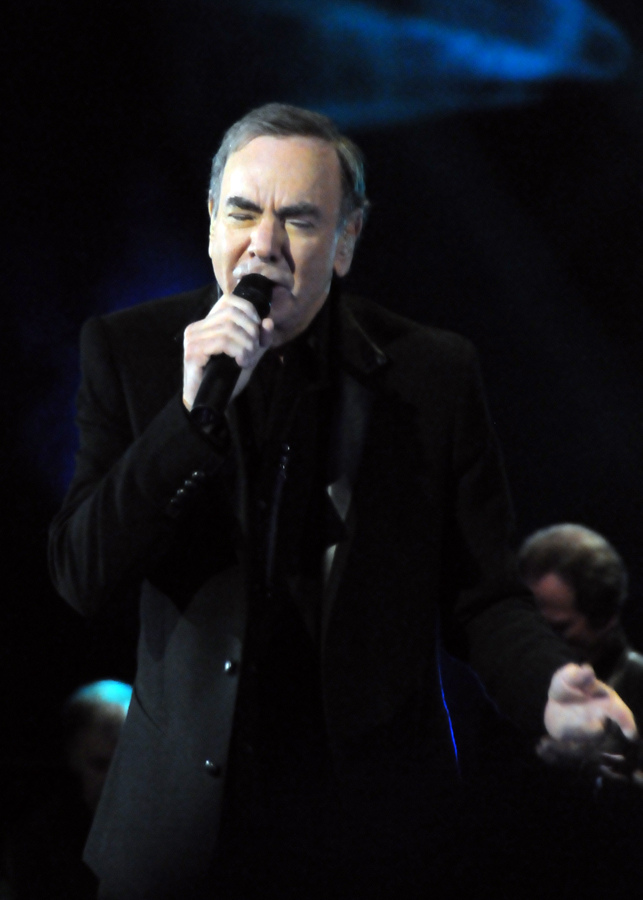
Diamond performing at The Roundhouse in London in 2010

A more severely stripped-down-to-basics album, 12 Songs, produced by Rick Rubin, was released on November 8, 2005, in two editions: a standard 12-song release, and a special edition with two bonus tracks, including one featuring backing vocals by Brian Wilson. The album debuted at No. 4 on the Billboard chart, and received generally positive reviews; Erlewine describes the album as "inarguably Neil Diamond's best set of songs in a long, long time." 12 Songs also became noteworthy as one of the last albums to be pressed and released by Sony BMG with the Extended Copy Protection software embedded in the disc. (See the 2005 Sony BMG CD copy protection scandal.)

In 2007, Diamond was inducted into the Long Island Music Hall of Fame.

On March 19, 2008, it was announced on the television show American Idol that Diamond would be a guest mentor to the remaining Idol contestants, who would sing Diamond songs for the broadcasts of April 29 and 30, 2008. On the April 30 broadcast, Diamond premiered a new song, "Pretty Amazing Grace", from his then recently released album Home Before Dark. On May 2, 2008, Sirius Satellite Radio started Neil Diamond Radio. On April 8, 2008, Diamond made a surprise announcement in a big-screen broadcast at Fenway Park that he would be appearing there "live in concert" on August 23, 2008, as part of his world tour. The announcement, which marked the first official confirmation of any 2008 concert dates in the US, came during the traditional eighth-inning singalong of "Sweet Caroline", which had by that time become an anthem for Boston fans.

Home Before Dark was released May 6, 2008, and topped the album charts in New Zealand, the United Kingdom and the United States.

On June 29, 2008, Diamond played to an estimated 108,000 fans at the Glastonbury Festival in Somerset, England on the Concert of a Lifetime Tour; technical problems, including the sound cutting out, marred the concert. In August, Diamond allowed cameras to record his entire four-night run at New York's Madison Square Garden; he released the resulting DVD in the US in 2009, one year to the day of the first concert. Hot August Night/NYC debuted at No. 2 on the charts. On the same day the DVD was released, CBS aired an edited version, which won the ratings hour with 13 million viewers. The next day, the sales of the DVD surged, prompting Sony to order more copies to meet the high demand.

On August 25, 2008, Diamond performed at Ohio State University while suffering from laryngitis. The result disappointed him as well as his fans, and on August 26, he offered refunds to anyone who applied by September 5.

Diamond was honored as the MusiCares Person of the Year on February 6, 2009, two nights before the 51st Annual Grammy Awards.

Long loved in Boston, Diamond was invited to sing at the July 4, 2009, Independence Day celebration.

On October 13, 2009, he released A Cherry Cherry Christmas, his third album of holiday music.

=== 2010s ===
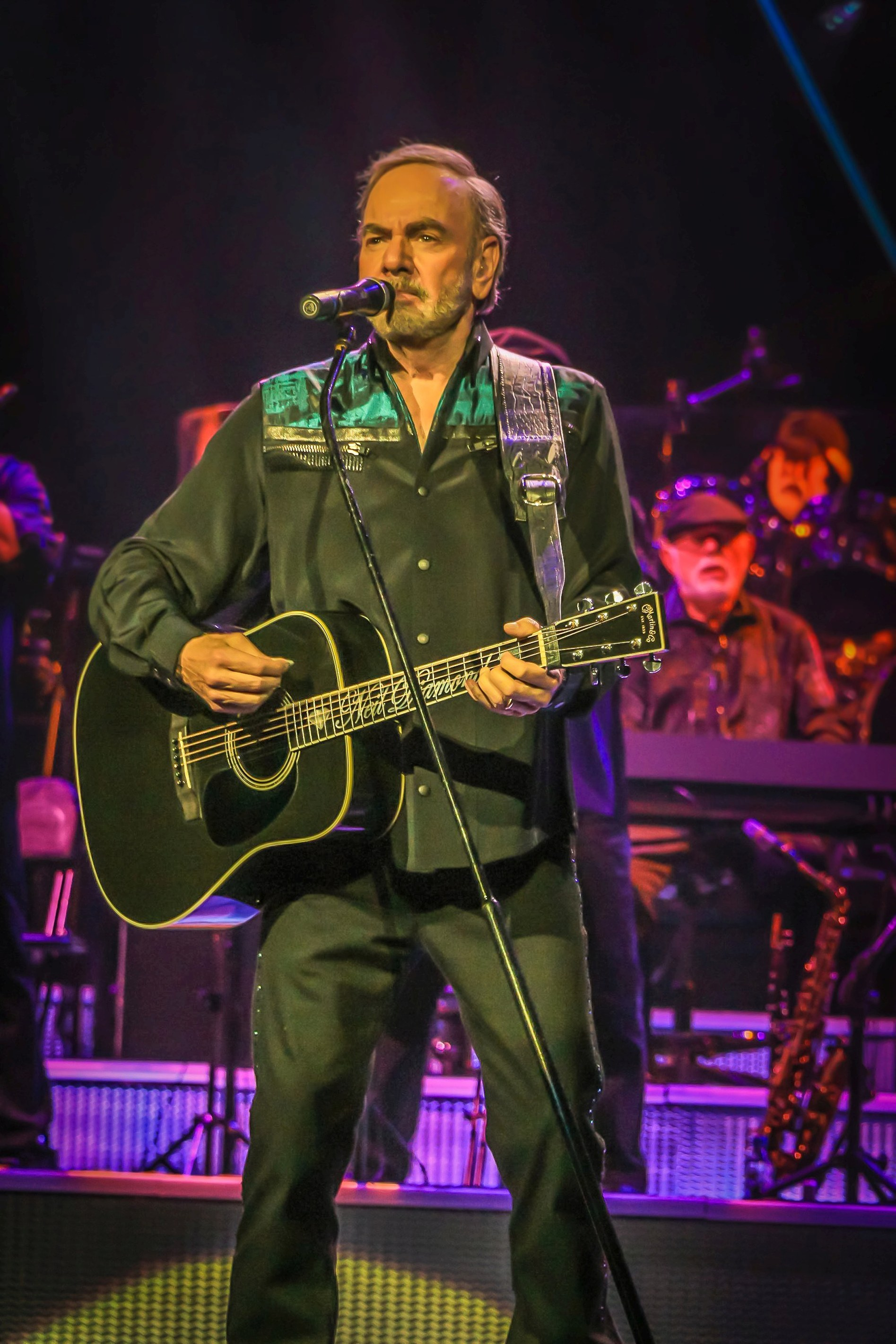
Diamond performing in 2015

On November 2, 2010, Diamond released the album Dreams, a collection of 14 interpretations of his favorite songs by artists from the rock era. The album also included a new slow-tempo arrangement of his "I'm a Believer". In December, he performed a track from the album, "Ain't No Sunshine", on NBC's The Sing-Off with Committed and Street Corner Symphony, two a cappella groups featured on the show. The Very Best of Neil Diamond, a compilation CD of Diamond's 23 studio recordings from the Bang, UNI/MCA, & Columbia catalogs, was released on December 6, 2011, on the Sony Legacy label.

The years 2011 and 2012 were marked by several milestones in Diamond's career. On March 14, 2011, he was inducted into the Rock and Roll Hall of Fame at a ceremony at the Waldorf-Astoria Hotel in New York City. In December, he received a lifetime achievement award from the Kennedy Center at the 2011 Kennedy Center Honors. On August 10, 2012, Diamond received a star on the Hollywood Walk of Fame. In November 2012, he topped the bill at the centenary edition of the Royal Variety Performance in the UK, which was transmitted on December 3. He also appeared in the Macy's Thanksgiving Day Parade.

On April 20, 2013, Diamond made an unannounced appearance at Fenway Park to sing "Sweet Caroline" during the 7th inning. It was the first game at Fenway since the Boston Marathon bombing. On July 2, he released the single "Freedom Song (They'll Never Take Us Down)", with 100% of the purchase price benefiting One Fund Boston and the Wounded Warrior Project. Sporting a beard, Diamond performed live on the west lawn of the U.S. Capitol as part of A Capitol Fourth, which was broadcast nationally by PBS on July 4, 2013.

In January 2014, it was confirmed that Diamond had signed with the Capitol Music Group unit of Universal Music Group, which also owned Diamond's Uni/MCA catalog. UMG also took over Diamond's Columbia and Bang catalogues, which meant that all of his recorded output would be consolidated for the first time.

On July 8, 2014, Capitol Records announced, via a flyer included with Diamond's latest greatest hits compilations, All-Time Greatest Hits, which charted at 15 on the Billboard 200, that his next album, Melody Road, which was to be produced by Don Was and Jacknife Lee, would be released on September 30, 2014. In August, the release date was moved to October 21.

In September 2014, Diamond performed a surprise concert at his alma mater, Erasmus High School in Brooklyn. The show was announced via Twitter that afternoon. On the same day, he announced a 2015 "Melody Road" World Tour. The North American leg of the World Tour 2015 launched with a concert in Allentown, PA at the PPL Center on February 27 and ended at the Pepsi Center in Denver, Colorado on May 31, 2015. Diamond used new media platforms and social media extensively throughout the tour, streaming several shows live on Periscope and showing tweets from fans who used the hashtag #tweetcaroline on two large screens. The San Diego Union-Tribune wrote: "This, my friends, wasn't your grandfather's Neil Diamond concert. It was a multimedia extravaganza. Twitter. Periscope...It was a social media blitzkrieg that, by all accounts, proved to be an innovative way to widen his fan base."

In October 2016, Diamond released Acoustic Christmas, a folk-inspired Christmas album of original songs as well as acoustic versions of holiday classics. Produced by Was and Lee, who had produced Melody Road, the idea for the album began to take shape as the Melody Road sessions ended. To "channel the intimate atmosphere of '60s folk, Diamond recorded Acoustic Christmas with a handful of musicians, sitting around a circle of microphones, wires and, of course, Christmas lights."

In March 2017, the career-spanning anthology Neil Diamond 50 – 50th Anniversary Collection was released. He began his final concert tour, the 50 Year Anniversary World Tour in Fresno, California, in April.

In 2019, his 1969 signature song "Sweet Caroline" was selected by the Library of Congress for preservation in the National Recording Registry for being "culturally, historically, or aesthetically significant".

In January 2018, Diamond announced that he would stop touring after he was diagnosed with Parkinson's disease. Tour dates on the final leg of Diamond's "50 Year Anniversary World Tour" in Australia and New Zealand were cancelled. An announcement on his official website said he was not retiring from music and that the cancellation of the live performances would allow him to "continue his writing, recording and development of new projects."

On July 28, 2018, Diamond and his wife, Katie, made a surprise visit to the Incident Command post in Basalt, Colorado, near Diamond's home, to thank firefighters and their families for efforts to contain the Lake Christine Fire, which began on July 3 and scorched 12,000 acres (4,900 ha; 49 km^{2}). Diamond performed a solo acoustic guitar concert in their honor. Diamond remains active in raising awareness about Parkinson's disease.

=== 2020s ===
On March 7, 2020, Diamond gave a rare performance at the Keep Memory Alive Power of Love Gala at the MGM Grand Garden Arena in Las Vegas, where he was being honored.

On March 22, 2020, Diamond posted a video to YouTube playing "Sweet Caroline" with slightly modified lyrics ("...washing hands, don't touch me, I won't touch you...") in response to the widespread social distancing measures implemented due to the worldwide COVID-19 pandemic.

In April 2021, the New York Times reported that A Beautiful Noise, a musical based on Diamond's life and featuring his songs, would open at the Emerson Colonial Theater in Boston in the summer of 2022. The musical was scheduled to open on Broadway following the month-long run in Boston.

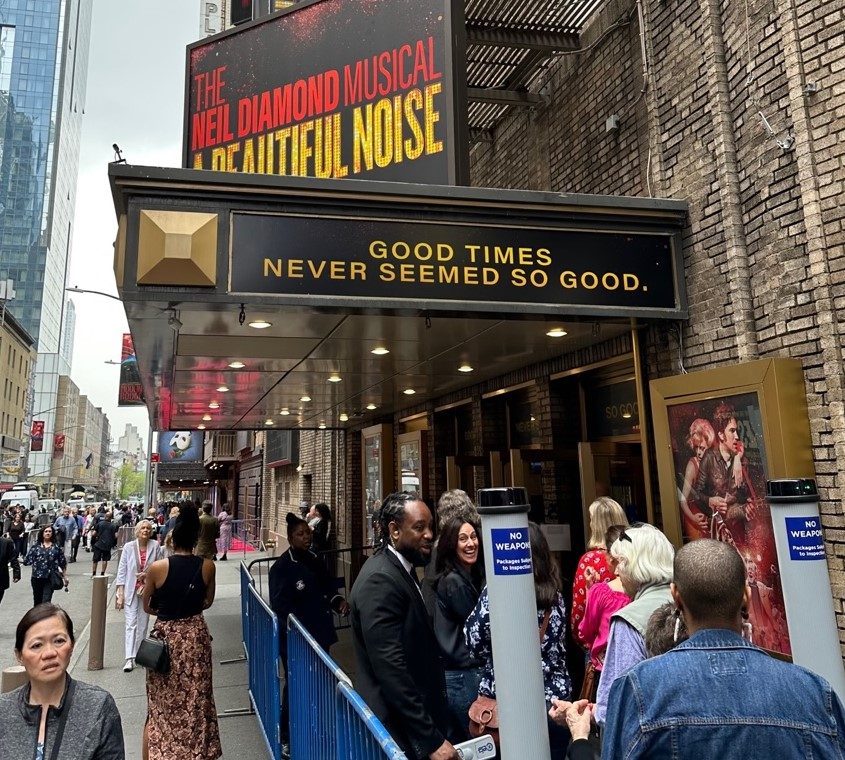
A Beautiful Noise, the Neil Diamond musical, opened at the Broadhurst Theater on Broadway in December 2022.

Universal Music Group acquired Diamond's songwriting catalog and the rights to his Bang, Columbia, and Capitol recordings in 2022, including 110 unreleased tracks, an unreleased album, and archival videos.

On June 18, 2022, Diamond sang "Sweet Caroline" during the 7th-inning stretch of a Red Sox game at Fenway Park. In a surprise appearance, he was joined by Will Swenson, who portrayed Diamond in A Beautiful Noise.

On May 8, 2026, Wild at Heart, the third and final album of material Diamond recorded with Rick Rubin as producer was released.

== In popular culture ==
In 1967, Diamond was featured on the fourth episode of the detective drama Mannix as the 'featured' artist in a small underground club called 'The Bad Scene' and was interrupted during his singing by one of many fights that took place weekly on the show.

In 2000, Neil Diamond appeared onstage with a Diamond tribute band, Super Diamond, surprising them before their show at House of Blues in Los Angeles.

In the 2001 comedy film Saving Silverman, the main characters play in a Diamond cover band; Diamond made an extended cameo appearance as himself. Diamond even wrote and composed a new song, "I Believe in Happy Endings", for the film. He sat in with the tribute band Super Diamond at the film's premiere party.

In recent times, fans of the England national football team sing Sweet Caroline since Tony Parry (Wembley DJ) played it after England had defeated Germany at Wembley in Euro 2020. "Three Lions" co-writer Frank Skinner said "I thought Sweet Caroline went slightly better than Three Lions in the post-match sing-song."

== Personal life ==
Diamond has been married three times. In 1963, he married his high-school sweetheart, Jaye Posner. They had two daughters, separated in 1967 and divorced in 1969.

In 1969, Diamond wed production assistant Marcia Murphey. They had two sons and divorced after 25 years of marriage.

In 2012, Diamond married Katie McNeil. In addition to serving as Diamond's manager, McNeil produced the documentary Neil Diamond: Hot August Nights NYC.

== Discography ==
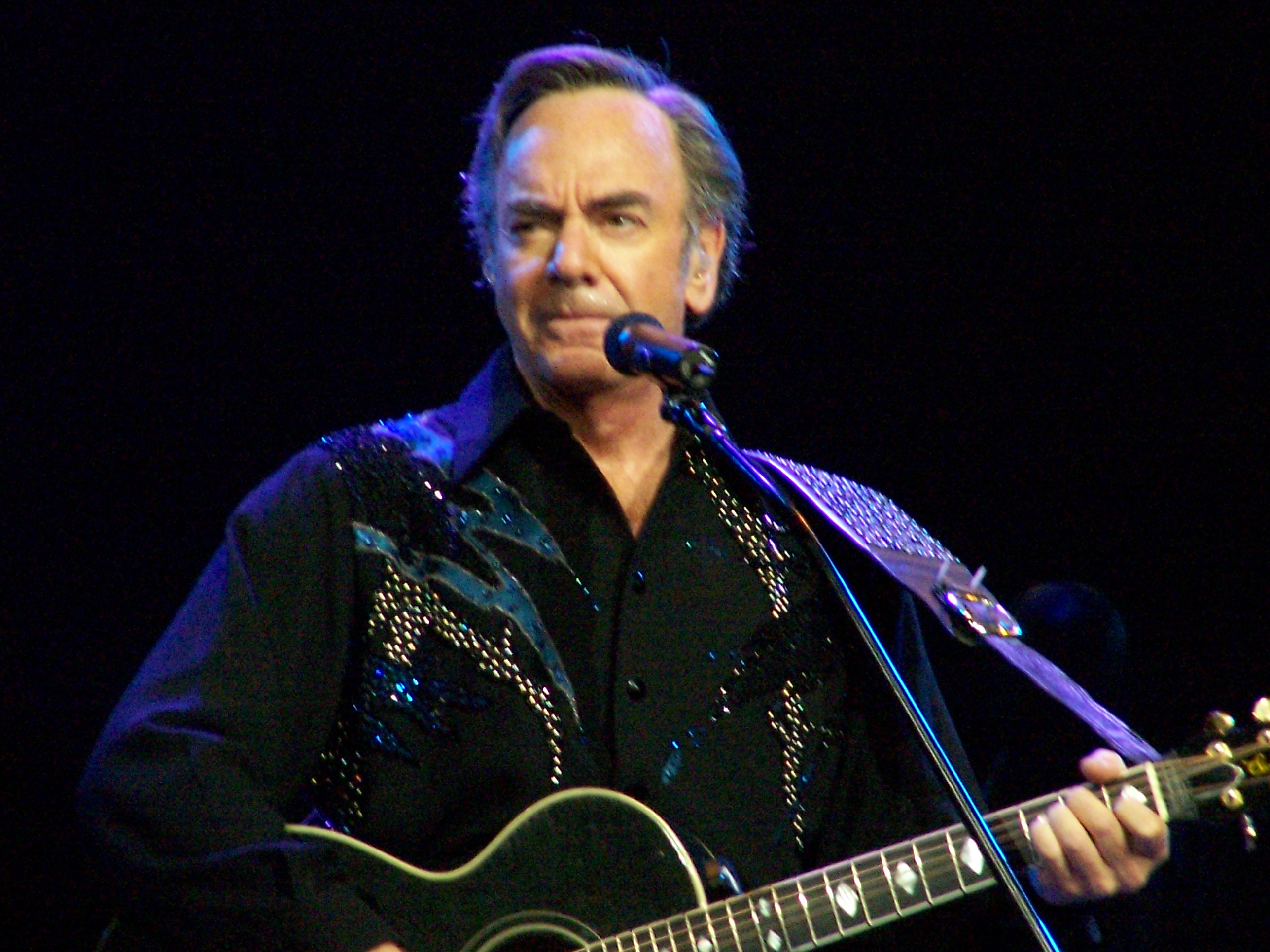
Diamond performing in 2005

- The Feel of Neil Diamond (1966)
- Just for You (1967)
- Velvet Gloves and Spit (1968)
- Brother Love's Travelling Salvation Show (1969)
- Touching You, Touching Me (1969)
- Tap Root Manuscript (1970)
- Stones (1971)
- Moods (1972)
- Serenade (1974)
- Beautiful Noise (1976)
- I'm Glad You're Here with Me Tonight (1977)
- You Don't Bring Me Flowers (1978)
- September Morn (1979)
- On the Way to the Sky (1981)
- Heartlight (1982)
- Primitive (1984)
- Headed for the Future (1986)
- The Best Years of Our Lives (1988)
- Lovescape (1991)
- The Christmas Album (1992)
- Up on the Roof: Songs from the Brill Building (1993)
- The Christmas Album, Volume II (1994)
- Tennessee Moon (1996)
- The Movie Album: As Time Goes By (1998)
- Three Chord Opera (2001)
- 12 Songs (2005)
- Home Before Dark (2008)
- A Cherry Cherry Christmas (2009)
- Dreams (2010)
- Melody Road (2014)
- Acoustic Christmas (2016)
- Classic Diamonds (with London Symphony Orchestra, 2020)
- Wild at Heart (2026)

== Filmography ==
- Mannix, "The Many Deaths of Saint Christopher", 1967, as himself
- The Last Waltz, 1978, as himself
- The Jazz Singer, 1980, starring role as Jess Robin
- Saving Silverman, 2001, appearing as himself
- Keeping Up with the Steins, 2006, appearing as himself
- Trevor Noah: Where Was I, 2023, appearing as himself
