= Solitary Man (song) =

1966 single by Neil Diamond

- Cover to 1970 re-release

Single by Neil Diamond

from the album The Feel of Neil Diamond
- B-side: "Do It" (1966 release); "The Time Is Now" (1970 re-release)
- Released: April 4, 1966
- Recorded: January 24, 1966
- Genre: Pop rock
- Length: 2:27
- Label: BANG
- Songwriter: Neil Diamond
- Producers: Jeff Barry & Ellie Greenwich

Neil Diamond singles chronology
| "At Night" (1963) | "Solitary Man" (1966) | "Cherry, Cherry" (1966) |

"Solitary Man" is a song written by American musician Neil Diamond, who recorded the song for Bang Records in late January 1966. It has since been covered many times, notably by T. G. Sheppard, Gianni Morandi, Chris Isaak, Johnny Cash and HIM.

== History ==
Recorded in late January 1966 and initially released on Bang Records in April 1966, "Solitary Man" was Diamond's second single as a solo recording artist, three years after his initial stint with Columbia Records, and four years after his two largely unsuccessful singles recorded with Jack Parker for Duel Records. At this time, he already had moderate (though accidental) success as a songwriter for other artists; their versions of the songs he had already written and composed were released before his own versions. By July, the track had become a minor hit, rising to No. 55 on the U.S. pop singles chart. It would then be included on Diamond's first album, The Feel of Neil Diamond, which he released in August 1966.

The song is a "ballad of a loner looking for love." The theme of the song has been closely identified with Diamond himself, as evinced by a 2008 profile in The Daily Telegraph: "This is the Solitary Man depicted on his first hit in 1966: the literate, thoughtful and melodically adventurous composer of songs that cover a vast array of moods and emotions..."

In the lyrics, the singer lists some of his relationships and how they each ended. He laments "I know it's been done, having one girl who loves you." But he doubts it will happen for him. Indeed, Diamond himself would tell interviewers in the 2000s, "After four years of Freudian analysis, I realized I had written 'Solitary Man' about myself."

After Diamond had renewed commercial success with Uni Records at the end of the decade, Bang Records re-released "Solitary Man" as a single and it reached No. 21 on the U.S. pop charts in the summer of 1970. It also reached No. 6 on the Easy Listening chart.

Billboard praised the "solid dance beat and excellent production backing." Record World said that the "acoustic backing is just right for [Diamond] to get another ride to the top of the charts."

Diamond originally recorded two versions of the song, as he later did with "Cherry, Cherry”. The one version had his harmonic vocal track on the refrain of the song, along with accompaniment by a wordless female chorus. The other version was him singing the song alone, without his prerecorded harmony or the female chorus.

In a 2005 Rolling Stone retrospective, Dan Epstein wrote, "'Solitary Man' remains the most brilliantly efficient song in the Diamond collection. There's not a wasted word or chord in this two-and-a-half minute anthem of heartbreak and self-affirmation, which introduced the melancholy loner persona that he's repeatedly returned to throughout his career."

== Chart history ==
| Chart (1966) | Peak position |
|---|---|
| Canada RPM Top Singles | 56 |
| US Billboard Hot 100 | 55 |
| US Cash Box Top 100 | 60 |

| Chart (1970) | Peak position |
|---|---|
| Australia Go-Set | 36 |
| Canada RPM Top Singles | 31 |
| Canada RPM Adult Contemporary | 24 |
| US Billboard Hot 100 | 21 |
| US Billboard Easy Listening | 6 |
| US Cash Box Top 100 | 20 |

== Notable cover versions ==
=== T. G. Sheppard version ===
"Solitary Man"

Single by T.G. Sheppard

from the album Solitary Man
- B-side: "Shame"
- Released: May 29, 1976
- Genre: Country
- Length: 2:39
- Label: Hitsville
- Songwriter: Neil Diamond

T.G. Sheppard singles chronology
| "Motels and Memories" (1975) | "Solitary Man" (1976) | "Show Me a Man" (1976) |

In 1976, T. G. Sheppard released a cover version for Hitsville Records, a country-focused sub-label of Motown Records. It went to No. 14 on the U.S. country music chart (Hot Country Songs) and No. 100 on the Hot 100. The song charted best on the Canadian country chart, at No. 11. It was also a hit on the Easy Listening charts of both nations.

=== Gianni Morandi version ===
Italian singer Gianni Morandi recorded a cover version titled "Se perdo anche te" ("If I Also Lose You"). The author of the Italian lyrics was Franco Migliacci, who was Morandi's producer at that time. "Se perdo anche te" spent ten weeks on the Italian pop chart in 1967, peaking at No. 1 for one week. The song was arranged by Ennio Morricone, who at that time conducted many tunes published by the Italian branch of the RCA Victor Records label.

=== Chris Isaak version ===
"Solitary Man"

Single by Chris Isaak

from the album San Francisco Days
- B-side: "Wicked Game"
- Released: 1993
- Recorded: 1992
- Genre: Rock
- Length: 2:37
- Label: Reprise
- Songwriter: Neil Diamond

Chris Isaak singles chronology
| "San Francisco Days" (1993) | "Solitary Man" (1993) | "Somebody's Crying" (1995) |

Chris Isaak included "Solitary Man" as the only cover song on his 1993 album San Francisco Days. The music video for Isaak's version of the song was directed by Larry Clark. Isaak said that he chose the song because his mother was a fan of Diamond, and he liked the song's lyrics, especially the clever rhymes. Isaak noted that Diamond's version has a horn section playing in a manner reminiscent of the 1968 television series Hawaii Five-O.

=== Johnny Cash version ===
"Solitary Man"

Song by Johnny Cash

from the album American III: Solitary Man
- Language: English
- Released: October 17, 2000 (25 years ago)
- Genre: Country
- Length: 2:26
- Label: American Recordings
- Songwriter: Neil Diamond
- Producers: John Carter Cash, Rick Rubin

Johnny Cash used "Solitary Man" for the title track of his third album under the American Recordings label, American III: Solitary Man, in 2000, featuring guest backing vocals by Tom Petty. The recording received a Grammy Award for Best Male Country Vocal Performance.

=== HIM version ===
"Solitary Man"

Single by HIM

from the album And Love Said No: The Greatest Hits 1997–2004
- Released: March 1, 2004
- Length: 3:36
- Label: BMG Finland, RCA
- Songwriter: Neil Diamond
- Producer: HIM

HIM singles chronology
| "The Sacrament" (2003) | "Solitary Man" (2004) | "And Love Said No" (2004) |

In 2004, Finnish rock band HIM covered "Solitary Man" for their first compilation album, And Love Said No: The Greatest Hits 1997–2004. It was released as a single, and Bam Margera produced a music video created for it. This cover peaked at No. 2 in Finland and became HIM's highest-charting single in the United Kingdom, reaching No. 9 on the UK Singles Chart

==== Track listings ====
Finnish and European version

1. "Solitary Man" – 3:38
2. "Please Don't Let It Go" (live) – 3:14
3. "Join Me in Death" (live) – 4:59
4. "Website extras included as Enhanced CD content"

UK DVD single

1. "Solitary Man" (video) – 3:36
2. "Right Here in My Arms" (video) – 3:30
3. Bam Margera's making of Buried Alive By Love" – 1:58
4. Pandora's slideshow – 4:00
5. "Your Sweet 666" (audio—live 2003) – 4:40

UK CD single

1. "Solitary Man"
2. "Please Don't Let it Go" (punk rock version—live 2003)

UK 7-inch vinyl

1. "Solitary Man"
2. (Etched B-side contains no music)

==== Charts ====
| Chart (2004) | Peak position |
|---|---|
| Austria (Ö3 Austria Top 40) | 45 |
| Finland (Suomen virallinen lista) | 2 |
| Germany (GfK) | 17 |
| Scottish Singles Sales (Official Charts) | 13 |
| Sweden (Sverigetopplistan) | 37 |
| Switzerland (Schweizer Hitparade) | 40 |
| UK Singles (Official Charts) | 9 |
| UK Rock & Metal (Official Charts) | 2 |
