= The Essential Neil Diamond =

Compilation album by Neil Diamond
- Released: December 4, 2001
- Recorded: February, 1966 – October 28, 2001
- Genre: Pop rock
- Length: 141:09
- Label: Columbia
- Compilers: Neil Diamond, Al Quaglieri

Neil Diamond chronology
Three Chord Opera (2001)	The Essential Neil Diamond (2001)	Play Me: The Complete Uni Studio Recordings...Plus! (2002)

Professional ratings
Review scores
Source	Rating
AllMusic	3/5 stars

The Essential Neil Diamond is a two-disc compilation album by Neil Diamond. It was released by Sony Music in 2001.

Diamond and his collaborator Al Quaglieri personally chose the 38 tracks that appeared in the collection. Nine selections were from Diamond's early period with Bang Records (1966–68) while 14 were from his Columbia years, which began in 1973. The Bang recordings are now owned by Sony, Columbia's parent company. For the five top-ten hits that Diamond recorded for Uni Records (1968–73), Columbia leased the rights for their appearance on this collection. Ten recordings on the album were not the original studio recordings but live renditions from concerts. "You Don't Bring Me Flowers", Diamond's 1978 duet with Barbra Streisand, is included in The Essential Barbra Streisand as well as this compilation. The Essential Neil Diamond reached number 90 on the Billboard 200 chart and was awarded double platinum status by the RIAA on March 3, 2016.

In 2009, Columbia issued an expanded version of the album titled The Essential Neil Diamond 3.0, which featured the original two discs and a third disc containing eight more selections.

== Track listing ==
All songs written by Neil Diamond, except where noted.

Disc one
No.	Title	Length
1.	"Solitary Man"	2:32
2.	"Cherry, Cherry"	2:42
3.	"I Got the Feelin' (Oh No, No)"	2:13
4.	"Kentucky Woman"	2:26
5.	"Girl, You'll Be a Woman Soon"	2:55
6.	"You Got to Me"	2:48
7.	"Red Red Wine"	2:41
8.	"Thank the Lord for the Night Time"	3:00
9.	"I'm a Believer"	2:43
10.	"Sweet Caroline"	3:21
11.	"Song Sung Blue"	3:13
12.	"Holly Holy"	4:30
13.	"I Am... I Said"	3:33
14.	"Cracklin' Rosie"	2:59
15.	"Play Me" (live recording)	4:21
16.	"Morningside" (live recording)	5:25
17.	"Crunchy Granola Suite" (live recording)	4:05
18.	"Brooklyn Roads" (live recording)	5:29
19.	"Soolaimon" (live recording)	5:06
Total length:		1:06:02

Disc two
No.	Title	Writer(s)	Length
1.	"America"		4:19
2.	"Hello Again"	Diamond, Alan Lindgren	3:39
3.	"Love on the Rocks"	Gilbert Bécaud, Diamond	3:40
4.	"Captain Sunshine" (live recording)		3:20
5.	"He Ain't Heavy, He's My Brother" (live recording)	Bob Russell, Bobby Scott	3:46
6.	"Yes I Will " / "Lady Magdalene" (live recording; medley)		7:01
7.	"Shilo" (live recording)		3:57
8.	"Brother Love's Travelling Salvation Show" (live recording)		5:02
9.	"If You Know What I Mean"		3:43
10.	"Beautiful Noise"		3:26
11.	"You Don't Bring Me Flowers"	Alan Bergman, Marilyn Bergman, Diamond	3:16
12.	"Desiree"		3:17
13.	"Forever in Blue Jeans"	Richard Bennett, Diamond	3:39
14.	"September Morn"	Bécaud, Neil Diamond	3:52
15.	"I've Been This Way Before"		3:48
16.	"Yesterday's Songs"		2:51
17.	"Heartlight"	Burt Bacharach, Diamond, Carole Bayer Sager	4:26
18.	"Headed for the Future"	Diamond, Lindgren, Tom Hensley	4:06
19.	"You Are the Best Part of Me"		3:59
Total length:			1:15:07

Disc three (Limited edition 3.0)
No.	Title	Length
1.	"The Boat That I Row"	2:41
2.	"Do It"	1:53
3.	"Longfellow Serenade"	3:51
4.	"And the Grass Won't Pay No Mind" (live recording)	4:10
5.	"Done Too Soon" (live recording)	2:53
6.	"Glory Road" (live recording)	3:37
7.	"Pretty Amazing Grace" (live recording)	3:29
8.	"Hell Yeah"	4:33
Total length:		27:07

== Certifications ==
Region	Certification	Certified units/sales
Australia (ARIA)	Platinum	70,000^{^}
New Zealand (RMNZ)	3× Platinum	45,000^{^}
United Kingdom (BPI)	Gold	100,000^{^}
United States (RIAA)	2× Platinum	2,000,000^{‡}
^{^} Shipments figures based on certification alone.^{‡} Sales+streaming figures based on certification alone.
