= Stages: Performances 1970–2002 =

Box set by Neil Diamond
- Released: September 30, 2003
- Recorded: 1970–2002
- Genres: Pop, rock
- Length: 5:14:16 (CDs only)
- Label: Columbia
- Producers: Neil Diamond, Sam Cole

Neil Diamond chronology
Play Me: The Complete Uni Studio Recordings...Plus! (2002)	Stages: Performances 1970–2002 (2003)	12 Songs (2005)

Professional ratings
Review scores
Source	Rating
Allmusic	2/5 stars

Stages: Performances 1970–2002 is a box set by Neil Diamond that was released by Columbia Records in 2003. The set consists of five compact discs of concert recordings plus a DVD containing live recordings plus a documentary.

The first two CDs of the set, "A Night in Las Vegas", are drawn from Diamond's December 27, 2002, performance at MGM Grand Garden Arena. The third and fourth CDs consist of material recorded between 1970 (the same version of the song "Lordy" appears on Diamond's 1970 album Gold) and 2001 in North America, the United Kingdom, Ireland, Australia and Germany. The fifth CD is devoted to Christmas music. The DVD features Diamond's July 2002 show in Dublin plus a documentary "Welcome to Diamondville". Stages reached position number 137 on the Billboard 200 chart.

Allmusic critic Thom Jurek gave the collection a negative review, stating:

This is a job shoddily and, yes, very cynically done. Where Hot August Night and Hot August Night II were real occasions to celebrate Diamond's mind-blowing live potential, Stages is really just a marketing ploy to get fans, the people who should be rewarded, to shell out more of their hard-earned dollars for considerably less aesthetically.

== Compact disc track listing ==
All songs written by Neil Diamond, except where noted.

Disc one
No.	Title	Writer(s)	Length
1.	"Overture"	Diamond, Alan Lindgren	2:09
2.	"America"		4:17
3.	"A Mission of Love"		4:13
4.	"Hello Again"	Diamond, Alan Lindgren	4:02
5.	"Kentucky Woman"		2:24
6.	"The Boat That I Row"		2:39
7.	"Cherry, Cherry"		2:43
8.	"Red Red Wine"		2:39
9.	"I'm a Believer"		2:42
10.	"Play Me"		4:21
11.	"Love on the Rocks"	Gilbert Bécaud, Diamond	3:38
12.	"Soolaimon"		5:07
13.	"If You Know What I Mean"		3:40
14.	"Beautiful Noise"		3:22
15.	"Girl, You'll Be a Woman Soon"		2:54
16.	"I Haven't Played This Song in Years"		4:25
17.	"You Are the Best Part of Me"		3:59
18.	"Forever in Blue Jeans"	Richard Bennett, Diamond	3:37
Total length:			1:02:51

Disc two
No.	Title	Writer(s)	Length
1.	"Starflight"	Tom Hensley, Alan Lindgren	5:06
2.	"Captain Sunshine"		3:19
3.	"Holly Holy"		4:21
4.	"Sweet Caroline"		4:06
5.	"Sweet Caroline" (reprise)		4:06
6.	"You Don't Bring Me Flowers"	Alan Bergman, Marilyn Bergman, Diamond	3:14
7.	"Yes I Will" / "Lady Magdalene"		8:01
8.	"Shilo"		3:26
9.	"He Ain't Heavy, He's My Brother"	Bob Russell, Bobby Scott	3:58
10.	"I Am... I Said"		5:07
11.	"Cracklin' Rosie"		3:07
12.	"Brother Love's Travelling Salvation Show"		5:00
13.	"America" (followed by walk off)		4:17
Total length:			57:08

Disc three
No.	Title	Writer(s)	Length
1.	"Lordy"		4:55
2.	"Brooklyn Roads"		5:28
3.	"Home Is a Wounded Heart"		2:40
4.	"The Last Picasso"		4:29
5.	"The Last Thing on My Mind"	Tom Paxton	4:20
6.	"You Got to Me"		2:45
7.	"God Only Knows"	Tony Asher, Brian Wilson	4:08
8.	"Lay Lady Lay"	Bob Dylan	4:08
9.	"Glory Road"		3:52
10.	"Rocket Man"	Elton John, Bernie Taupin	6:07
11.	"Say Maybe"		4:06
12.	"Once in a While"		3:39
13.	"Rainy Day Song"	Gilbert Bécaud, Diamond	4:31
14.	"Guitar Heaven"	Bécaud, Diamond	3:36
15.	"Songs of Life"	Bécaud, Diamond	3:32
16.	"Fire on the Tracks"		3:03
17.	"Brooklyn on a Saturday Night"		3:41
18.	"Primitive"		4:24
19.	"The Story of My Life"		3:39
Total length:			1:17:03

Disc four
No.	Title	Writer(s)	Length
1.	"This Time"	Diamond, David Foster, Jeremy Lubbock	3:55
2.	"The American Popular Song"	Tom Hensley	5:13
3.	"Teach Me Tonight"	Sammy Cahn, Gene DePaul	2:07
4.	"Dedicated to the One I Love"	Ralph Bass, Lowman Pauling	1:54
5.	"Spanish Harlem"	Jerry Leiber, Phil Spector	3:43
6.	"Golden Slumbers", "Carry That Weight", "The End" (Beatles medley)	John Lennon, Paul McCartney	3:40
7.	"Sweet L.A. Days"	Diamond, Doug Rhone	3:54
8.	"Fortune of the Night"	Diamond, Hensley, Alan Lindgren	4:08
9.	"Mountains of Love"	Diamond, Hensley, Lindgren	4:53
10.	"If There Were No Dreams"	Diamond, Michel Legrand	3:14
11.	"All I Really Need Is You"	Diamond, Hensley, Lindgren	4:39
12.	"Yesterday's Songs"		2:49
13.	"Can Anybody Hear Me"	Diamond, Bill LaBounty	3:50
14.	"Talking Optimist Blues (Good Day Today)"	Diamond, Gretchen Peters	2:53
15.	"Everybody"	Jesse Diamond, Neil Diamond	3:46
16.	"Marry Me"	Diamond, Tom Shapiro	3:55
17.	"In My Lifetime"		4:44
18.	"I Got the Feelin' (Oh No, No)"		2:12
19.	"Longfellow Serenade"		3:50
20.	"Unchained Melody"	Alex North, Hy Zaret	3:50
21.	"I Believe in Happy Endings"		4:27
Total length:			1:17:36

Disc five
No.	Title	Writer(s)	Length
1.	"O Holy Night"	Adolphe Adam, John Sullivan Dwight	3:33
2.	"Silent Night"	Franz Gruber, Joseph Mohr	4:03
3.	"White Christmas"	Irving Berlin	3:55
4.	"Rudolph the Red-Nosed Reindeer"	Johnny Marks	2:46
5.	"O come, O come, Emmanuel"	Traditional	1:12
6.	"The Little Drummer Boy"	Katherine Kennicott Davis	3:57
7.	"Morning Has Broken"	Eleanor Farjeon, Cat Stevens, traditional	3:02
8.	"You Make It Feel Like Christmas"		3:37
9.	"The Christmas Song"	Mel Tormé, Robert Wells	3:32
10.	"Winter Wonderland"	Felix Bernard, Richard B. Smith	3:03
11.	"Santa Claus Is Coming to Town"	J. Fred Coots, Haven Gillespie	3:43
12.	"We Wish You a Merry Christmas"	Traditional	3:15
Total length:			39:38

== DVD track listing ==
1. "America"
2. "Hello Again"
3. "Solitary Man"
4. "I'm a Believer"
5. "September Morn"
6. "Beautiful Noise"
7. "Girl, You'll Be a Woman Soon"
8. "Sweet Caroline"
9. "Sweet Caroline" (reprise)
10. "I Am... I Said"
11. "Cracklin' Rosie"
12. "Brother Love's Traveling Salvation Show"
13. Backstage:"Welcome to Diamondville"
