= Play Me: The Complete Uni Studio Recordings...Plus! =

Box set by Neil Diamond
- Released: March 26, 2002
- Recorded: 1968–1972
- Genre: Pop rock
- Length: 3:54:19
- Label: MCA

Neil Diamond chronology
The Essential Neil Diamond (2001)	Play Me: The Complete Uni Studio Recordings...Plus! (2002)	Stages: Performances 1970–2002 (2003)

Professional ratings
Review scores
Source	Rating
Allmusic	4/5 stars

Play Me: The Complete Uni Studio Recordings...Plus! is a box set of Neil Diamond's recordings for Uni Records. This anthology contains all of the tracks from:

- Velvet Gloves and Spit (1968)
- Brother Love's Travelling Salvation Show (1969)
- Touching You, Touching Me (1969)
- Tap Root Manuscript (1970)
- Stones (1971)
- Moods (1972)

The Plus! part of the collection contains live tracks from:

- Gold: Recorded Live at the Troubadour (1970)
- Hot August Night (MCA, 1972)

In addition to all of the album and bonus tracks, Play Me contains the CD debuts of "Broad Old Woman (6 A.M. Insanity)" (B-side of "Two-Bit Manchild"), and the live single version of "Cherry Cherry" from Hot August Night. It also contains the re-recorded version of "Shilo", which was added to Velvet Gloves and Spit after its initial release, as well as the hit single "Sweet Caroline", which started as a non-album single, but was later added to the album Brother Love's Travelling Salvation Show, which was then reissued as Sweet Caroline.

While this album contains every track from the studio albums, it does not contain every note. "Shilo" is missing the opening note, while "Stones" is missing a couple of measures from the intro.

== Track listing ==
Disc One
No.	Title	Source	Length
1.	"Two-Bit Manchild"	Velvet Gloves and Spit	3:04
2.	"A Modern Day Version of Love"	Velvet Gloves and Spit	2:48
3.	"Honey-Drippin' Times"	Velvet Gloves and Spit	1:58
4.	"The Pot Smoker's Song"	Velvet Gloves and Spit	3:59
5.	"Brooklyn Roads"	Velvet Gloves and Spit	3:37
6.	"Shilo" (1970 Re-recording)	Velvet Gloves and Spit (reissue)	2:56
7.	"Sunday Sun"	Velvet Gloves and Spit	2:44
8.	"Holiday Inn Blues"	Velvet Gloves and Spit	3:14
9.	"Practically Newborn"	Velvet Gloves and Spit	3:27
10.	"Knackelflerg"	Velvet Gloves and Spit	2:23
11.	"Merry-Go-Round"	Velvet Gloves and Spit	3:29
12.	"Broad Old Woman (6 A.M. Insanity)"	B-side of "Two-Bit Manchild"	4:31
13.	"Brother Love's Travelling Salvation Show"	Brother Love's Travelling Salvation Show	3:26
14.	"Dig In"	Brother Love's Travelling Salvation Show	2:39
15.	"River Runs, New Grown Plums"	Brother Love's Travelling Salvation Show	1:58
16.	"Juliet"	Brother Love's Travelling Salvation Show	2:51
17.	"Long Gone"	Brother Love's Travelling Salvation Show	3:15
18.	"And the Grass Won't Pay No Mind"	Brother Love's Travelling Salvation Show	3:30
19.	"Glory Road"	Brother Love's Travelling Salvation Show	3:17
20.	"Deep in the Morning"	Brother Love's Travelling Salvation Show	3:04
21.	"If I Never Knew Your Name"	Brother Love's Travelling Salvation Show	3:16
22.	"Memphis Streets"	Brother Love's Travelling Salvation Show	2:38
23.	"You're So Sweet Horseflies Keep Hangin' 'Round Your Face"	Brother Love's Travelling Salvation Show	3:13
24.	"Hurtin' You Don't Come Easy"	Brother Love's Travelling Salvation Show	2:29
25.	"Sweet Caroline"	Sweet Caroline	3:18
26.	"Everybody's Talkin'"	Touching You, Touching Me	2:42
Total length:			1:19:46

Disc Two
No.	Title	Source	Length
1.	"Mr. Bojangles"	Touching You, Touching Me	4:52
2.	"Smokey Lady"	Touching You, Touching Me	2:40
3.	"Holly Holy"	Touching You, Touching Me	4:40
4.	"Both Sides Now"	Touching You, Touching Me	3:30
5.	"And the Singer Sings His Song"	Touching You, Touching Me	3:37
6.	"Ain't No Way"	Touching You, Touching Me	2:42
7.	"New York Boy"	Touching You, Touching Me	2:38
8.	"Until It's Time for You to Go"	Touching You, Touching Me	3:29
9.	"Cracklin' Rosie"	Tap Root Manuscript	2:59
10.	"Free Life"	Tap Root Manuscript	3:10
11.	"Coldwater Morning"	Tap Root Manuscript	3:21
12.	"Done Too Soon"	Tap Root Manuscript	2:41
13.	"He Ain't Heavy, He's My Brother"	Tap Root Manuscript	4:09
14.	"Childsong"	Tap Root Manuscript	2:10
15.	"I Am the Lion"	Tap Root Manuscript	2:07
16.	"Madrigál"	Tap Root Manuscript	1:50
17.	"Soolaimón"	Tap Root Manuscript	4:25
18.	"Missa"	Tap Root Manuscript	2:15
19.	"African Suite"	Tap Root Manuscript	4:28
20.	"Childsong (Reprise)"	Tap Root Manuscript	2:03
21.	"I Am...I Said"	Stones	3:34
22.	"The Last Thing on My Mind"	Stones	3:33
23.	"Husbands and Wives"	Stones	3:46
24.	"Chelsea Morning"	Stones	2:36
Total length:			1:17:15

Disc Three
No.	Title	Source	Length
1.	"Crunchy Granola Suite"	Stones	2:53
2.	"Stones"	Stones	3:01
3.	"If You Go Away"	Stones	3:48
4.	"Suzanne"	Stones	4:41
5.	"I Think It's Gonna Rain Today"	Stones	2:35
6.	"I Am...I Said (Reprise)"	Stones	2:37
7.	"Song Sung Blue"	Moods	3:14
8.	"Porcupine Pie"	Moods	2:04
9.	"High Rolling Man"	Moods	2:34
10.	"Canta Libre"	Moods	4:45
11.	"Captain Sunshine"	Moods	3:23
12.	"Play Me"	Moods	3:51
13.	"Gitchy Goomy"	Moods	3:51
14.	"Walk on Water"	Moods	3:04
15.	"Theme"	Moods	1:38
16.	"Prelude in E Major"	Moods	0:39
17.	"Morningside"	Moods	4:15
18.	"Lordy" (Live)	Gold: Recorded Live at the Troubadour	4:56
19.	"Kentucky Woman" (Live)	Gold: Recorded Live at the Troubadour	2:40
20.	"Thank the Lord for the Night Time" (Live)	Gold: Recorded Live at the Troubadour	3:11
21.	"Solitary Man" (Live)	Hot August Night	3:15
22.	"Cherry, Cherry" (Live single version)	"Cherry Cherry" from Hot August Night	3:49
23.	"Red Red Wine" (Live)	Hot August Night	3:45
24.	"Girl, You'll Be a Woman Soon" (Live)	Hot August Night	2:49
Total length:			1:17:18
