= On the Way to the Sky =

Studio album by Neil Diamond
- Released: October 9, 1981
- Recorded: 1981
- Studios: Arch Angel Studios, Record Plant and The Village Recorder (Los Angeles, California); Sunset Sound Recorders and Cherokee Studios (Hollywood, California)
- Genre: Rock
- Length: 42:09
- Label: Columbia
- Producers: Neil Diamond; Dennis St. John

Neil Diamond chronology
The Jazz Singer (1980)	On the Way to the Sky (1981)	Heartlight (1982)

Singles from On the Way to the Sky
- 1. "Yesterday's Songs" Released: November 1981; 2. "On the Way to the Sky" Released: February 1982; 3. "Be Mine Tonight" Released: May 1982

Professional ratings
Review scores
Source	Rating
AllMusic	2.5/5 stars
The Rolling Stone Album Guide	1/5 stars

On the Way to the Sky is the fourteenth studio album by Neil Diamond, released in 1981. It contains the hit "Yesterday's Songs", which reached number eleven on the Billboard Hot 100 (and number one on the Hot Adult Contemporary Tracks chart), as well as the title track which peaked at number 27 in the US and a third single, "Be Mine Tonight", which also reached the Top 40, peaking at number 35.

Cash Box said of "Be Mine Tonight" that "from the full production to the singer's unique charisma and delivery, everything works here." Billboard said that it's a "bristling midtempo rocker with much of the energy and sass of 'America' or 'Longfellow Serenade.'"

For shipments of a million copies, the album was certified Platinum by the RIAA, but underperformed the previous year's 5× Platinum Jazz Singer, which reached number three on the albums chart and spawned three Billboard Top 10 hits.

== Track listing ==
All songs written by Neil Diamond, except where noted.

Side one
No.	Title	Writer(s)	Length
1.	"Yesterday's Songs"		2:51
2.	"On the Way to the Sky"	Diamond, Carole Bayer Sager	3:47
3.	"Right by You"	Diamond, Richard Bennett, Doug Rhone	3:37
4.	"Only You"	Diamond, Tom Hensley, Alan Lindgren	4:39
5.	"Save Me"		3:23
6.	"Be Mine Tonight"		2:39

Side two
No.	Title	Writer(s)	Length
1.	"The Drifter"		4:55
2.	"Fear of the Marketplace"		4:18
3.	"Rainy Day Song"	Diamond, Gilbert Bécaud	4:31
4.	"Guitar Heaven"		3:37
5.	"Love Burns"	Hensley, Lindgren	3:45

== Personnel ==
- Neil Diamond – lead vocals, arrangements (5)
- Alan Lindgren – acoustic piano, synthesizers, orchestra arrangements and conductor (1–3, 5, 7, 10)
- Tom Hensley – keyboards, acoustic piano, backing vocals, orchestra arrangements and conductor (4, 6, 8, 10)
- Richard Bennett – acoustic guitar, electric guitar
- Doug Rhone – guitars, backing vocals
- Reinie Press – bass
- Dennis St. John – drums
- King Errisson – percussion
- Vince Charles – percussion
- The John Rosenberg Horns and Strings – orchestra
- Assa Drori – concertmaster
- Patricia Henderson – backing vocals
- Linda Press – backing vocals
- H.L. Voelker – backing vocals
- Julia Tillman Waters – backing vocals
- Luther Waters – backing vocals
- Maxine Waters Willard – backing vocals
- Oren Waters – backing vocals

== Production ==
- Neil Diamond – producer
- Dennis St. John – co-producer
- Alan Lindgren – associate producer
- Andy Bloch – associate producer, recording, mixing
- Ron Hitchcock – associate producer, recording, mixing
- Bill Benton – first assistant engineer
- David Bianco – first assistant engineer
- Jack Crymes – second assistant engineer
- Mark Eshelman – second assistant engineer
- Brad Gilderman – second assistant engineer
- John Markland – second assistant engineer
- Karen Siegel – second assistant engineer
- Gary Singleman – second assistant engineer
- Mike Reese – mastering at The Mastering Lab (Hollywood, California)
- Sam Cole – production coordinator
- Barry Cardinael – production assistant
- Terry Merchant – production assistant
- Juanita Scherf – production assistant
- Alison Zanetos – production assistant
- David Kirschner – art direction, design
- Jan Weinberg – contributing artist
- Kenneth McGowan – photography
- David Rosner – music publisher
- Rita Zak – music publisher

== Charts ==
Chart (1981–1982)	Peak position
Australian Albums (Kent Music Report)	12
Canada Top Albums/CDs (RPM)	36
Dutch Albums (Album Top 100)	14
German Albums (Offizielle Top 100)	56
New Zealand Albums (RMNZ)	11
UK Albums (Official Charts)	39
US Billboard 200	17

== Certifications ==
Region	Certification	Certified units/sales
New Zealand (RMNZ)	Gold	7,500^{^}
United Kingdom (BPI)	Silver	60,000^{^}
United States (RIAA)	Platinum	1,000,000^{^}
^{^} Shipments figures based on certification alone.
