= List of RPM number-one adult contemporary singles of 1982 =

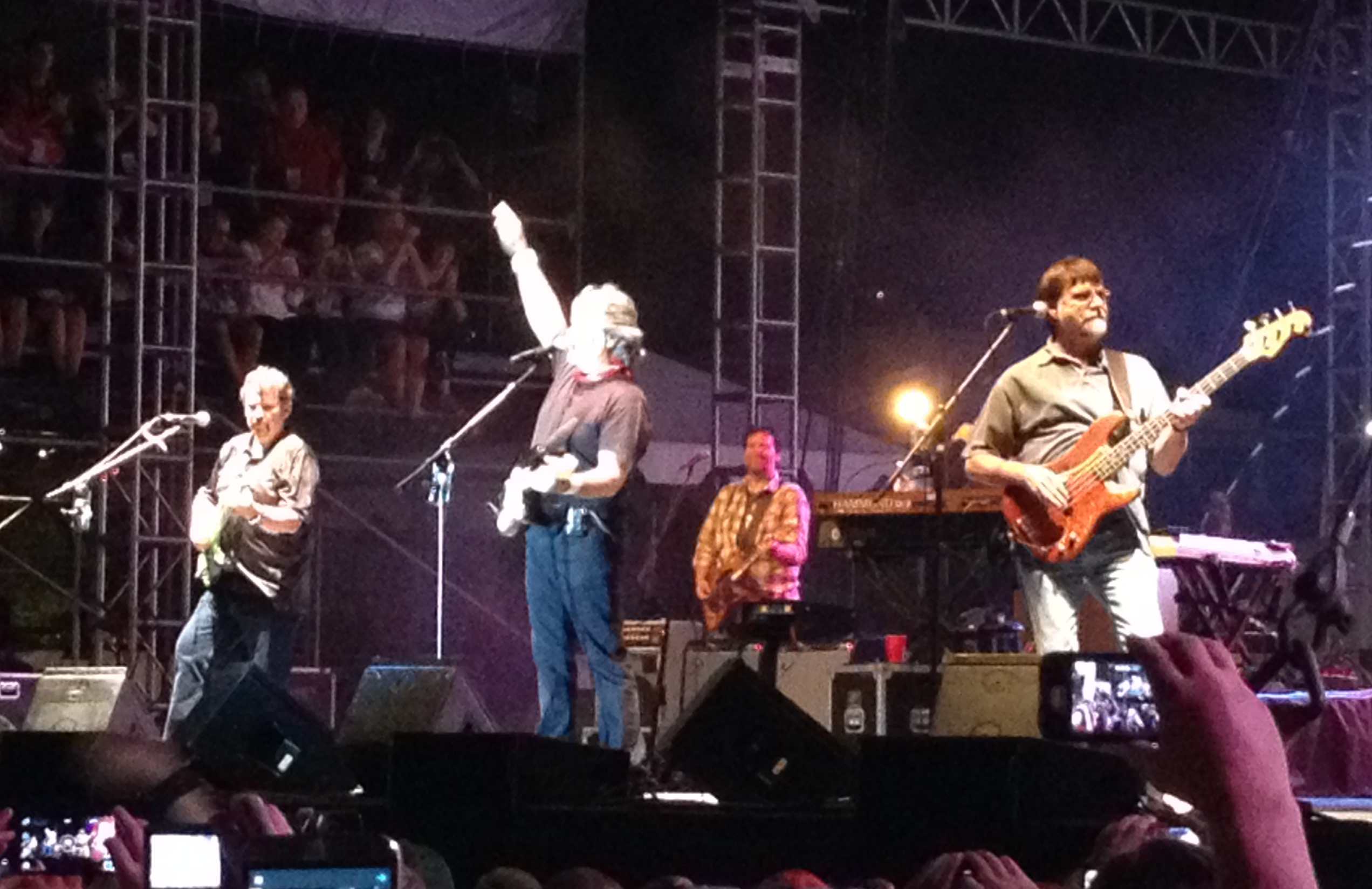
American country band Alabama (pictured in 2014) charted the most number-one singles in the chart for 1982, with three

In 1982, RPM magazine published a chart for top-performing singles in the adult contemporary category in Canada. The chart, entitled Contemporary Adult, has undergone numerous name changes and has become Adult Contemporary from 1984 to September 1988, and May 1989 until the magazine's final publication in November 2000. In 1982, 35 individual songs topped the chart, which contained 30 positions and is based on record sales and adult contemporary radio station playlist submissions.

== Chart history ==
An asterisk (*) indicates an unpublished weekly chart due to the special double issues RPM publishes for the year-end top singles charts.

Chart history
Issue date	Title	Artist(s)	Ref.
January 2*	"Comin' In and Out of Your Life"	Barbra Streisand	
January 9*	"Comin' In and Out of Your Life"	Barbra Streisand	
January 16	"Yesterday's Songs"	Neil Diamond	
January 23	"Yesterday's Songs"	Neil Diamond	
January 30	"I Wouldn't Have Missed It for the World"	Ronnie Milsap	
February 6	"The Sweetest Thing (I've Ever Known)"	Juice Newton	
February 13	"I Can't Go for That (No Can Do)"	Hall & Oates	
February 20	"Perhaps Love"	John Denver and Plácido Domingo	
February 27	"Perhaps Love"	John Denver and Plácido Domingo	
March 6	"Leader of the Band"	Dan Fogelberg	
March 13	"Bobbie Sue"	Oak Ridge Boys	
March 20	"Bobbie Sue"	Oak Ridge Boys	
March 27	"Love in the First Degree"	Alabama	
April 3	"Love in the First Degree"	Alabama	
April 10	"Key Largo"	Bertie Higgins	
April 17	"Key Largo"	Bertie Higgins	
April 24	"Another Sleepless Night"	Anne Murray	
May 1	"Chariots of Fire"	Vangelis	
May 8	"Chariots of Fire"	Vangelis	
May 15	"On the Way to the Sky"	Neil Diamond	
May 22	"Shanghai Breezes"	John Denver	
May 29	"Mountain Music"	Alabama	
June 5	"I've Never Been to Me"	Charlene	
June 12	"I've Never Been to Me"	Charlene	
June 19	"Run for the Roses"	Dan Fogelberg	
June 26	"Any Day Now"	Ronnie Milsap	
July 3	"Any Day Now"	Ronnie Milsap	
July 10	"Any Day Now"	Ronnie Milsap	
July 17	"When He Shines"	Sheena Easton	
July 24	"Even the Nights Are Better"	Air Supply	
July 31	"Island of Lost Souls"	Blondie	
August 7	"Island of Lost Souls"	Blondie	
August 14	"Take Me Down"	Alabama	
August 21	"Take Me Down"	Alabama	
August 28	"Hard to Say I'm Sorry"	Chicago	
September 4	"Love Will Turn You Around"	Kenny Rogers	
September 11	"Love Will Turn You Around"	Kenny Rogers	
September 18	"You Should Hear How She Talks About You"	Melissa Manchester	
September 25	"You Should Hear How She Talks About You"	Melissa Manchester	
October 2	"Hey Baby"	Anne Murray	
October 9	"Blue Eyes"	Elton John	
October 16	"Heartlight"	Neil Diamond	
October 23	"Abracadabra"	Steve Miller Band	
October 30	"I Will Always Love You"	Dolly Parton	
November 6	"Heartlight"	Neil Diamond	
November 13	"Heartlight"	Neil Diamond	
November 20	"Let It Be Me"	Willie Nelson	
November 27	"Break It to Me Gently"	Juice Newton	
December 4	"Southern Cross"	Crosby, Stills and Nash	
December 11	"Southern Cross"	Crosby, Stills and Nash	
December 18	"The Girl Is Mine"	Michael Jackson and Paul McCartney	
December 25	"You and I"	Eddie Rabbitt and Crystal Gayle	
