= Primitive (Neil Diamond album) =

Studio album by Neil Diamond
- Released: July 16, 1984
- Studios: Ocean Way Recording and Sunset Sound (Hollywood, California); Westlake Studios, Studio 55, The Complex and Lion Share Studios (Los Angeles, California); The Mix Room (Burbank, California)
- Length: 39:33
- Label: Columbia
- Producers: Denny Diante; Neil Diamond; Richard Bennett; Richard Perry

Neil Diamond chronology
Classics: The Early Years (1983)	Primitive (1984)	Headed for the Future (1986)

Professional ratings
Review scores
Source	Rating
AllMusic	2/5 stars

Primitive is the sixteenth studio album by Neil Diamond. It was released in 1984 on Columbia Records. Its singles "Turn Around", "Sleep With Me Tonight", and "You Make It Feel Like Christmas" reached numbers 4, 24, and 28, respectively on the Billboard Adult Contemporary singles chart, while "Turn Around" also reached number 62 on the Billboard Hot 100 chart. The album was certified gold by the RIAA on October 5, 1984.

Cash Box described "Turn Around" as "a swelling heart grabber with deft instrumentation to match its emotional lyrics".

The album ushered in a period of creative and commercial decline for Diamond that lasted, to one degree or another, until the release of the 2001 album Three Chord Opera, followed by his collaboration with producer Rick Rubin and the release of 2005's 12 Songs and 2008's Home Before Dark. While Diamond continued having some success and periodic hits, and some television specials and film appearances, the period beginning with the release of Primitive did not have for him the same level of sales, notoriety or fame that the preceding times did.

== Track listing ==
All songs written by Neil Diamond, except where noted.

Side one
No.	Title	Writer(s)	Length
1.	"Turn Around"	Burt Bacharach, Diamond, Carole Bayer Sager	3:45
2.	"Primitive"		4:27
3.	"Fire on the Tracks"		3:07
4.	"Brooklyn on a Saturday Night"		3:41
5.	"Sleep With Me Tonight"	Bacharach, Diamond, Bayer Sager	3:42
6.	"Crazy"	Bacharach, Diamond, Bayer Sager	3:41

Side two
No.	Title	Writer(s)	Length
1.	"My Time With You"	Tom Hensley, Alan Lindgren	4:29
2.	"Love's Own Song"	Sam Cole, Doug Rhone	3:32
3.	"It's a Trip (Go for the Moon)"		2:49
4.	"You Make It Feel Like Christmas"		3:58
5.	"One by One"		2:37

== Personnel ==
Musicians and vocalists

- Neil Diamond – lead vocals, guitar
- Michel Colombier – keyboards (1, 7, 8)
- Robbie Buchanan – synthesizers (1, 7, 8)
- Greg Phillinganes – keyboards (1, 7, 8)
- Tom Hensley – keyboards (2–4, 9–11), acoustic piano (2–4, 9–11)
- Alan Lindgren – acoustic piano (2–4, 9–11), synthesizers (2–4, 9–11)
- David Foster – Fender Rhodes (5, 6), synthesizers (5, 6)
- Michael Boddicker – additional synthesizers (5, 6)
- Steve Mitchell – additional synthesizer (5)
- Marty Walsh – guitars (1, 7, 8)
- Richard Bennett – acoustic guitar (2–4, 9–11), electric guitar (2–4, 9–11)
- Doug Rhone – guitars (2–4, 9–11), backing vocals (2–4, 9–11)
- George Doering – guitars (5, 6)
- Dennis Herring – guitars (5, 6)
- Neil Stubenhaus – bass guitar (1, 5–8)
- Reinie Press – bass guitar (2–4, 9–11)
- John Robinson – drums (1, 5–8)
- Ron Tutt – drums (2–4, 9–11), backing vocals (2–4, 9–11)
- Vince Charles – percussion (1–4, 7–11)
- Paulinho da Costa – percussion (1, 7, 8)
- King Errisson – percussion (2–4, 9–11)
- Lenny Castro – percussion (5, 6)
- Steve George – backing vocals (1, 6, 8)
- Richard Page – backing vocals (1, 6, 8)
- Linda Press – backing vocals (2–4, 9–11)

Music arrangements

- Michel Colombier – arrangements (1, 7, 8), horn and string arrangements (1, 7, 8), conductor (1, 7, 8)
- Tom Hensley – arrangements (2–4)
- Alan Lindgren – arrangements (2, 9–11)
- Jeremy Lubbock – arrangements (5), string arrangements and conductor (5)
- David Foster – synthesizer arrangements and conductor (6)

== Production ==
- Denny Diante – producer (1, 7, 8)
- Neil Diamond – producer (2–4, 9–11)
- Richard Bennett – producer (4)
- Richard Perry – producer (5, 6)
- Sam Cole – production coordinator
- Jo Anne McGettrick – production coordinator (1, 7, 8)
- Bradford Rosenberger – production coordinator (2–4, 9–11)
- David Kirschner – art direction, design
- Jan Weinberg – additional design
- Norman Seeff – photography

Technical credits

- Mike Reese – mastering at The Mastering Lab (Hollywood, California)
- George Massenburg – recording (1, 7, 8)
- Allen Sides – mixing (1–4, 7, 9–11), recording (2–4, 9–11)
- Jeremy Smith – recording (5, 6), remixing (5, 6)
- Mick Guzauski – mixing (8)
- Sharon Rice – assistant engineer (1, 7, 8)
- Steve Crimmel – assistant mix engineer (1, 7), first assistant engineer (2–4, 9–11)
- Steve Bates – second assistant engineer (2–4, 9–11)
- David Egerton – second assistant engineer (2–4, 9–11)
- Dave Dubow – assistant engineer (5, 6)
- Bobby Gerber – assistant engineer (5, 6)
- Greg Holguin – assistant engineer (5, 6)
- Michael Brooks – additional engineer (5, 6)
- Gabe Veltri – additional engineer (5, 6)

== Charts ==
Chart (1984)	Peak position
Australian Albums (Kent Music Report)	45
Canada Top Albums/CDs (RPM)	55
Dutch Albums (Album Top 100)	5
German Albums (Offizielle Top 100)	21
Swiss Albums (Schweizer Hitparade)	20
UK Albums (Official Charts)	7
US Billboard 200	35

== Certifications ==
Region	Certification	Certified units/sales
United Kingdom (BPI)	Silver	60,000^{^}
United States (RIAA)	Gold	500,000^{^}
^{^} Shipments figures based on certification alone.
