= List of Billboard Adult Contemporary number ones of 1981 =

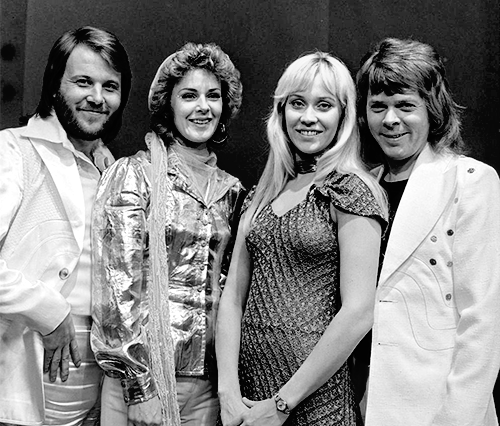
The Swedish group ABBA topped the chart with "The Winner Takes It All".

In 1981, Billboard magazine published a chart ranking the top-performing songs in the United States in the adult contemporary music (AC) market. The chart, which in 1981 was published under the title Adult Contemporary, has undergone various name changes during its history but has again been published as Adult Contemporary since 1996. In 1981, 20 songs topped the chart based on playlists submitted by radio stations.

In the January 3 issue of Billboard, the number one position was held by the British singer Leo Sayer with "More Than I Can Say", which retained the top spot from the last week of 1980. It remained atop the chart for two weeks in 1981 before being replaced by "I Love a Rainy Night" by the country singer Eddie Rabbitt, which also topped Billboard's pop singles chart, the Hot 100. Rabbitt's song was one of two tracks which reached the number one spot on the AC, country and pop charts during the early part of 1981, along with Dolly Parton's "9 to 5". Soon after Parton's song exited the number one position on the AC listing, the Scottish singer Sheena Easton topped the chart with "Morning Train (9 to 5)". In her native United Kingdom, the song had been a top ten success under the title "9 to 5", but it was given a new title for the U.S. market to avoid confusion with Parton's identically titled song.

Parton's song "9 to 5" was the theme song from the film of the same name, in which the singer starred, and was one of three AC number ones of 1981 to be taken from film soundtracks. In September, Diana Ross and Lionel Richie topped the chart with their duet "Endless Love" from the film of the same name, and "Arthur's Theme (Best That You Can Do)" by Christopher Cross, from the film Arthur, replaced it in the number one position. The longest-running number one of the year was "I Don't Need You" by Kenny Rogers, which spent six weeks in the top spot. Rogers was one of only two artists to have more than one AC number one in 1981, and his eight weeks atop the chart was the most by any artist. The only other act with multiple number ones during the year was Neil Diamond, who had the final number one of 1981 with "Yesterday's Songs", which held the top spot for the last two weeks of the year.

== Chart history ==
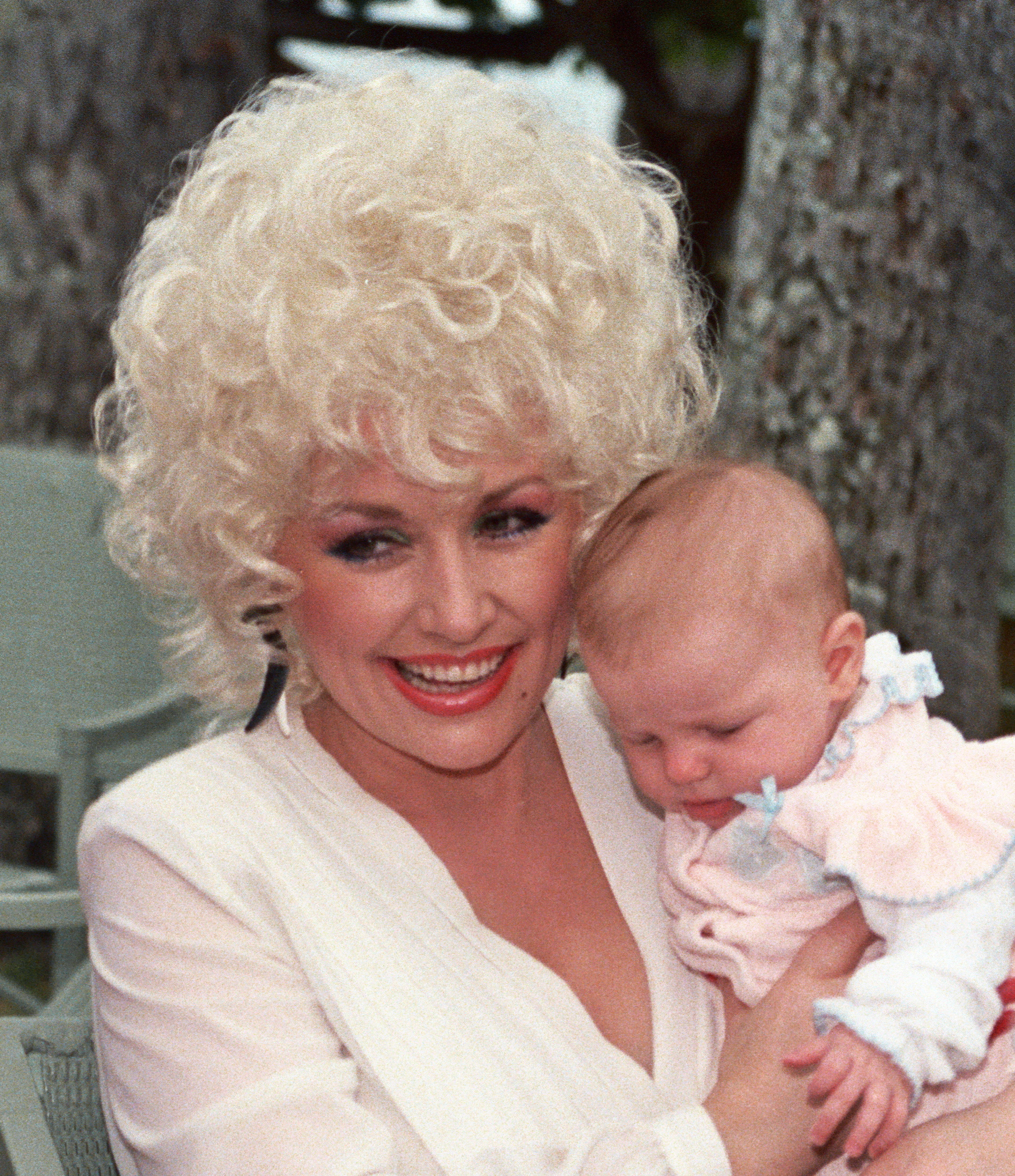
Dolly Parton topped the chart with "9 to 5", the theme song from the film of the same name, in which she starred.

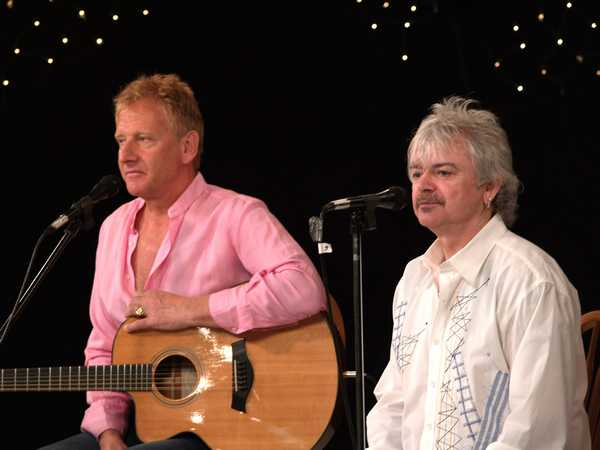
The British-Australian soft rock duo Air Supply's song "Here I Am (Just When I Thought I Was Over You)" spent a total of three weeks at number one.

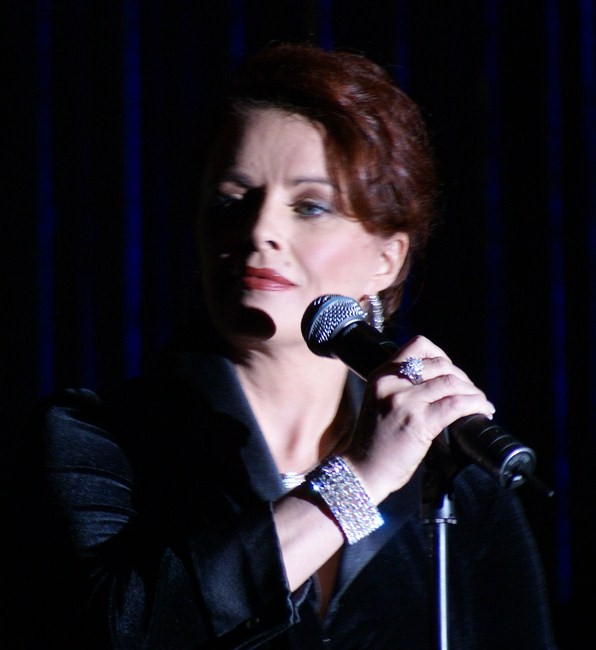
Sheena Easton reached number one with "Morning Train (9 to 5)". The song had been titled simply "9 to 5" in her native United Kingdom, but was re-titled for the American market to avoid confusion with Parton's song.

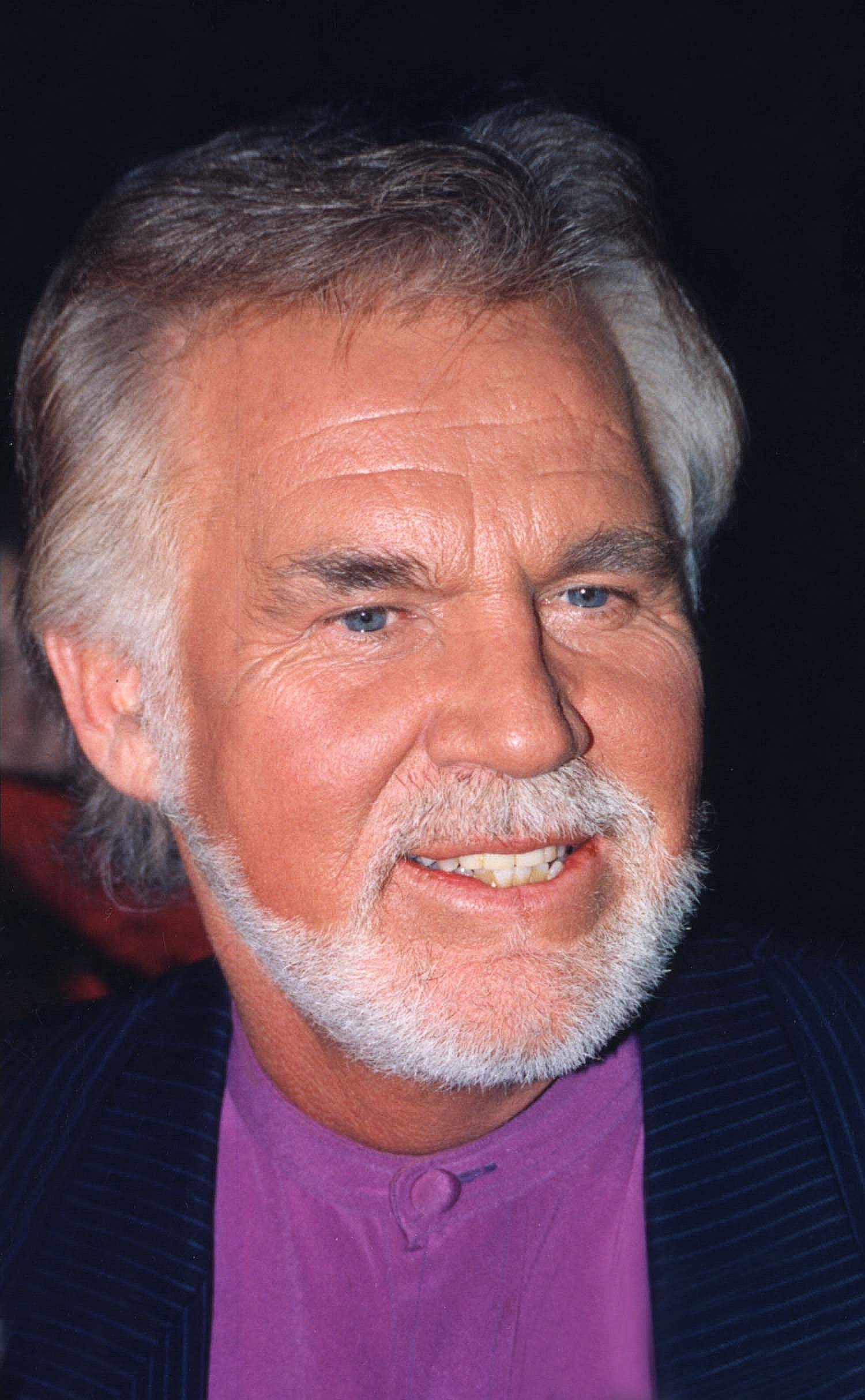
Kenny Rogers spent six weeks at number one with "I Don't Need You", the longest-running chart-topper of the year.

Chart history
Issue date	Title	Artist(s)	Ref.
January 3	"More Than I Can Say"	Leo Sayer	
January 10	"More Than I Can Say"	Leo Sayer	
January 17	"I Love a Rainy Night"	Eddie Rabbitt	
January 24	"I Love a Rainy Night"	Eddie Rabbitt	
January 31	"I Love a Rainy Night"	Eddie Rabbitt	
February 7	"The Winner Takes It All"	ABBA	
February 14	"The Winner Takes It All"	ABBA	
February 21	"Smoky Mountain Rain"	Ronnie Milsap	
February 28	"9 to 5"	Dolly Parton	
March 7	"9 to 5"	Dolly Parton	
March 14	"What Kind of Fool"	Barbra Streisand and Barry Gibb	
March 21	"What Kind of Fool"	Barbra Streisand and Barry Gibb	
March 28	"What Kind of Fool"	Barbra Streisand and Barry Gibb	
April 4	"What Kind of Fool"	Barbra Streisand and Barry Gibb	
April 11	"Angel of the Morning"	Juice Newton	
April 18	"Angel of the Morning"	Juice Newton	
April 25	"Angel of the Morning"	Juice Newton	
May 2	"Morning Train (9 to 5)"	Sheena Easton	
May 9	"Morning Train (9 to 5)"	Sheena Easton	
May 16	"Sukiyaki"	A Taste of Honey	
May 23	"Sukiyaki"	A Taste of Honey	
May 30	"How 'Bout Us"	Champaign	
June 6	"How 'Bout Us"	Champaign	
June 13	"America"	Neil Diamond	
June 20	"America"	Neil Diamond	
June 27	"America"	Neil Diamond	
July 4	"All Those Years Ago"	George Harrison	
July 11	"I Don't Need You"	Kenny Rogers	
July 18	"I Don't Need You"	Kenny Rogers	
July 25	"I Don't Need You"	Kenny Rogers	
August 1	"I Don't Need You"	Kenny Rogers	
August 8	"I Don't Need You"	Kenny Rogers	
August 15	"I Don't Need You"	Kenny Rogers	
August 22	"Touch Me When We're Dancing"	The Carpenters	
August 29	"Touch Me When We're Dancing"	The Carpenters	
September 5	"Endless Love"	Diana Ross and Lionel Richie	
September 12	"Endless Love"	Diana Ross and Lionel Richie	
September 19	"Endless Love"	Diana Ross and Lionel Richie	
September 26	"Arthur's Theme (Best That You Can Do)"	Christopher Cross	
October 3	"Arthur's Theme (Best That You Can Do)"	Christopher Cross	
October 10	"Arthur's Theme (Best That You Can Do)"	Christopher Cross	
October 17	"Arthur's Theme (Best That You Can Do)"	Christopher Cross	
October 24	"Share Your Love with Me"	Kenny Rogers	
October 31	"Share Your Love with Me"	Kenny Rogers	
November 7	"Here I Am (Just When I Thought I Was Over You)"	Air Supply	
November 14	"Here I Am (Just When I Thought I Was Over You)"	Air Supply	
November 21	"Here I Am (Just When I Thought I Was Over You)"	Air Supply	
November 28	"The Old Songs"	Barry Manilow	
December 5	"The Old Songs"	Barry Manilow	
December 12	"The Old Songs"	Barry Manilow	
December 19	"Yesterday's Songs"	Neil Diamond	
December 26	"Yesterday's Songs"	Neil Diamond	
