= The Jazz Singer (soundtrack) =

Soundtrack album by Neil Diamond
- Released: November 10, 1980
- Recorded: 1980
- Genres: Pop; rock
- Length: 40:11
- Labels: Capitol (original and 2014 reissue); Columbia (1996 reissue)
- Producer: Bob Gaudio

Neil Diamond chronology
September Morn (1979)	The Jazz Singer (1980)	On the Way to the Sky (1981)

Singles from The Jazz Singer
- 1. "Love on the Rocks" Released: October 1980; 2. "Hello Again" Released: January 1981; 3. "America" Released: April 1981

Professional ratings
Review scores
Source	Rating
AllMusic	3/5 stars

The Jazz Singer is an album by American singer-songwriter Neil Diamond, which served as the soundtrack album to the 1980 film The Jazz Singer. The soundtrack was released in November 1980 on Capitol Records, instead of Diamond's then-usual Columbia Records, because the film was produced by EMI Films, owned by the parent company of the label for which the soundtrack was released. The soundtrack was re-released in February 1996 on Columbia Records in the United States and Sony elsewhere. After Diamond signed with Capitol Records, this album was reissued by Capitol globally in 2014.

The film's reviews were negative, earning Diamond the first Razzie for Worst Actor at the 1st Golden Raspberry Awards, but made a modest profit at the box office, grossing almost double its budget. However, its soundtrack was a huge success and became Diamond's biggest-selling album in the United States, selling over 5 million copies there and reaching No. 3 on the pop albums chart. This would mark the second time a Neil Diamond soundtrack outperformed the movie from which it came (after Jonathan Livingston Seagull). Three songs from the album became top ten hits on the Billboard Hot 100, with "Love on the Rocks", "Hello Again" and "America" reaching Nos. 2, 6, and 8, respectively.

== Track listing ==
Side one
No.	Title	Writer(s)	Length
1.	"America"	Neil Diamond	4:18
2.	"Adon Olom"	Traditional	0:32
3.	"You Baby"	Diamond	3:01
4.	"Love on the Rocks"	Diamond; Gilbert Bécaud	3:40
5.	"Amazed and Confused"	Diamond; Richard Bennett	2:53
6.	"On the Robert E. Lee"	Diamond; Bécaud	2:03
7.	"Summerlove"	Diamond; Bécaud	3:17

Side two
No.	Title	Writer(s)	Length
1.	"Hello Again"	Diamond; Alan Lindgren	4:04
2.	"Acapulco"	Diamond; Doug Rhone	2:48
3.	"Hey Louise"	Diamond; Bécaud	3:00
4.	"Songs of Life"	Diamond; Bécaud	3:32
5.	"Jerusalem"	Diamond	3:03
6.	"Kol Nidre/My Name Is Yussel"	Traditional; adapted by Diamond; Uri Frenkel; /Diamond	1:38
7.	"America (Reprise)"	Diamond	2:22

== Personnel ==
- Neil Diamond – guitar, lead vocals
- Richard Bennett – acoustic and electric guitars
- Doug Rhone – guitar, backing vocals
- Alan Lindgren – synthesizers, pianos, orchestra arrangements and conductor (1, 4, 5, 8, 10, 11)
- Tom Hensley – keyboards, pianos, orchestra arrangements and conductor (5, 7, 12)
- Reinie Press – bass
- Dennis St. John – drums, music director
- Vince Charles – percussion
- King Errisson – percussion
- Assa Drori – concertmaster
- Jimmy Getzoff – concertmaster
- Sid Sharp – concertmaster
- John Rosenberg – orchestra contractor
- Bob Gaudio – vocal arrangements
- Donny Gerard – backing vocals
- Marilyn O'Brien – backing vocals
- Linda Press – backing vocals, vocal arrangements
- H.L. Voelker – backing vocals
- Luther Waters – backing vocals
- Oren Waters – backing vocals
- Choir – Timothy Allan Bullara, Jeremy C. Lipton, Dale D. Morich, Yoav Steven Paskowitz, Boyd H. Schlaefer, Mark H. Stevens, David Teisher and James Gregory Wilburn

== Production ==
- Producer – Bob Gaudio
- Production coordination – Beatrice E. Marks and Alison Zanetos
- Production assistant – Rita Zak
- Recording engineer – Andy Bloch
- Assistant engineers – Bill Benton, David Bianco, Jack Crymes, Brad Gilderman, Mark Eshelman, Larry Rebhun and Rick Ruggieri
- Recorded at Arch Angel Studios and Record Plant (Los Angeles, CA); Sunset Sound Recorders and Cherokee Studios (Hollywood, CA); Dawnbreaker Studios (San Fernando, CA)
- Mixed by Ron Hitchcock
- Mastered by Mike Reese, Doug Sax and Lois Walker at The Mastering Lab (Los Angeles, CA)
- Art direction and design – David Kirschner
- Contributing artwork – Michael Donaldson, David Kirschner, Ron Larson, John Squire and Jan Weinberg
- Photography – Larry Barbier
- Equipment – Ed Lever / Canyon Recorders

== Charts ==
Chart (1980–1981)	Peak position
Australian Albums (Kent Music Report)	10
Canada Top Albums/CDs (RPM)	7
Dutch Albums (Album Top 100)	6
German Albums (Offizielle Top 100)	40
Japanese Albums (Oricon)	51
New Zealand Albums (RMNZ)	24
UK Albums (Official Charts)	3
US Billboard 200	3

== Certifications ==
Region	Certification	Certified units/sales
Austria (IFPI Austria)	Gold	25,000^{*}
Canada (Music Canada)	3× Platinum	300,000^{^}
Hong Kong (IFPI Hong Kong)	Gold	10,000^{*}
South Africa (RISA)	2× Platinum	100,000^{*}
United Kingdom (BPI)	Platinum	300,000^{*}
United States (RIAA)	5× Platinum	5,000,000^{^}
^{*} Sales figures based on certification alone.^{^} Shipments figures based on certification alone.
