= Serenade (Neil Diamond album) =

Studio album by Neil Diamond
- Released: September 27, 1974
- Recorded: 1974
- Genres: Rock, soft rock
- Length: 32:45
- Label: Columbia
- Producer: Tom Catalano

Neil Diamond chronology
His 12 Greatest Hits (1974)	Serenade (1974)	Beautiful Noise (1976)

Singles from Serenade
- 1. "Longfellow Serenade" Released: 1974 (US); 2. "I've Been This Way Before" Released: 1975; 3. "The Last Picasso" Released: 1975

Professional ratings
Review scores
Source	Rating
AllMusic	2/5 stars
The Encyclopedia of Popular Music	3/5 stars
MusicHound Rock: The Essential Album Guide	2/5 stars
The Rolling Stone Album Guide	1/5 stars

Serenade is the ninth studio album by Neil Diamond, released in 1974. It was his second album for Columbia Records.

Three singles were lifted from the album: "Longfellow Serenade" (#5), "I've Been This Way Before" (#34) and "The Last Picasso". Serenade was Diamond's third consecutive platinum album. It was also issued as a quadraphonic LP with some songs as alternate takes.

== Production ==
"I've Been This Way Before" was originally meant to be the closing number on Jonathan Livingston Seagull, but Diamond was unable to finish it in time. Serenade was the last album for which Diamond solely wrote all the songs until 2001's Three Chord Opera.

== Critical reception ==
The Morning Call wrote that the songs "seemed overblown, self-important and banal - pale imitations . . . rewrites, if you will, of songs Diamond already had recorded," and praised Beautiful Noise as a righting of the ship.

Record World said of the single release of "The Last Picasso" that the "new mix brings to the album cut undeniably colorful AM hit strokes while none of its subtler appeal is brushed aside."

== Track listing ==
All tracks written by Neil Diamond.

Side one
No.	Title	Length
1.	"I've Been This Way Before"	3:45
2.	"Rosemary's Wine"	2:41
3.	"Lady Magdelene"	6:58
4.	"The Last Picasso"	4:24

Side two
No.	Title	Length
5.	"Longfellow Serenade"	3:50
6.	"Yes I Will"	4:35
7.	"Reggae Strut"	3:35
8.	"The Gift of Song"	2:22

== Personnel ==
- Neil Diamond - vocals, guitar
- Richard Bennett - guitar
- Emory Gordy, Jr. - bass guitar
- Alan Lindgren, David Paich - keyboards
- Dennis St. John - drums
- Jimmie Haskell - arranger, conductor

== Charts ==
=== Weekly charts ===
Chart (1974–75)	Peak position
Australian Albums (Kent Music Report)	1
Austrian Albums (Ö3 Austria)	7
Canada Top Albums/CDs (RPM)	2
Dutch Albums (Album Top 100)	3
German Albums (Offizielle Top 100)	1
New Zealand Albums (RMNZ)	3
UK Albums (Official Charts)	11
US Billboard 200	3

=== Year-end charts ===
Chart (1974)	Peak position
Australian Albums (Kent Music Report)	14

Chart (1975)	Peak position
Australian Albums (Kent Music Report)	24
German Albums (Offizielle Top 100)	3

== Certifications ==
Region	Certification	Certified units/sales
Australia (ARIA)	Gold	20,000^{^}
Canada (Music Canada)	Platinum	100,000^{^}
Germany (BVMI)	Gold	250,000^{^}
New Zealand (RMNZ)	Gold	41,000
United Kingdom (BPI)	Gold	100,000^{^}
United States (RIAA)	Platinum	1,000,000^{^}
^{^} Shipments figures based on certification alone.
