= 12 Songs (Neil Diamond album) =

Studio album by Neil Diamond
- Released: November 8, 2005
- Recorded: April 2004–Summer 2005
- Studios: Arch Angel Studios and Akademie Mathematique of Philosophical Sound (Los Angeles, California); Ocean Way Recording and The Sound Factory (Hollywood, California); Sound City Studios (Van Nuys, California)
- Genres: Rock, country
- Length: 54:15
- Label: American/Columbia
- Producer: Rick Rubin

Neil Diamond chronology
| Stages: Performances 1970–2002 (2003) | 12 Songs (2005) | The Best of Neil Diamond (2006) |

Professional ratings
Aggregate scores
| Source | Rating |
|---|---|
| Metacritic | 81/100 |
Review scores
| Source | Rating |
| AllMusic | 4/5 stars |
| Blender | 4.5/5 stars |
| E! | A |
| Entertainment Weekly | A |
| The Guardian | 5/5 stars |
| Mojo | 4/5 stars |
| Pitchfork | 4.1/10 |
| Q | 4.5/5 stars |
| Rolling Stone | 4/5 stars |
| Slant Magazine | 3.5/5 stars |

12 Songs is the twenty-sixth studio album by Neil Diamond, released in 2005. It was his first studio album since 2001's Three Chord Opera. It was produced by Rick Rubin.

The original pressing of the album was copy-protected using Sony's controversial XCP technology.

== Album history ==
Initial work on the album began after Diamond had concluded his tour behind Three Chord Opera in 2002. Retreating to his Colorado cabin, Diamond found himself temporarily snowed in, and started to pass the time away by working on new material.

Not long afterward, Diamond met Rick Rubin. Rubin expressed interest in working with Diamond, and the two got together several times at each other's homes before ever going into the recording studio.

Rubin, using the artist's Bang and early Uni albums as a springboard, encouraged Diamond to keep writing material over the course of a year. Once the two collaborators had plenty of material at their disposal that they felt strongly about, Rubin put together some of the same musicians he had used for Johnny Cash's American Recordings releases, including Tom Petty sidemen Mike Campbell and Benmont Tench, and encouraged Diamond to play guitar himself in the studio. The sessions were also the last ever performance by organ player Billy Preston, who died in June 2006.

The end result, 12 Songs, ended up being one of Diamond's most successful and critically acclaimed studio albums in years, debuting at #4 on the Billboard 200 album chart. Rubin's influence would extend beyond the recording sessions, as the subsequent tour behind the album found Diamond using tougher-sounding arrangements of his classic songs with his longtime backing band, and playing more guitar onstage than he had done since the Hot August Night era.

== Extended copy protection ==
In November 2005, it was revealed that Sony BMG was distributing albums with Extended Copy Protection (XCP), a controversial feature that automatically installed rootkit software on any Microsoft Windows machine upon insertion of the disc. In addition to preventing the CD's contents from being copied, Sony's software reported the users' listening habits back to the company; insecure features of the rootkit software also exposed the computer to malicious attacks. Though Sony refused to release a list of the affected CDs, the Electronic Frontier Foundation identified 12 Songs as one of the discs with the invasive software.

Rubin says that he and Diamond were not aware of XCP, and Rubin provided this explanation to The New York Times:

The CD debuted at No. 4 [and] was the highest debut of Neil's career, off to a great start. But Columbia—it was some kind of corporate thing—had put spyware on the CD. That kept people from copying it, but it also somehow recorded information about whoever bought the record. The spyware became public knowledge, and people freaked out. There were some lawsuits filed, and the CD was recalled by Columbia. Literally pulled from stores. We came out on a Tuesday, by the following week the CD was not available. Columbia released it again in a month, but we never recovered. Neil was furious, and I vowed never to make another album with Columbia.

By December 2005, Sony BMG had remastered and repressed 12 Songs and all other albums released with the XCP software as standard, non-copy-protected CDs.

== Track listing ==
All songs written by Neil Diamond.

1. "Oh Mary" - 5:12
2. "Hell Yeah" - 4:25
3. "Captain of a Shipwreck" - 3:55
4. "Evermore" - 5:18
5. "Save Me a Saturday Night" - 3:31
6. "Delirious Love" - 3:12
7. "I'm on to You" - 4:27
8. "What's It Gonna Be" - 4:04
9. "Man of God" - 4:21
10. "Create Me" - 4:10
11. "Face Me" - 3:27
12. "We" - 3:49
13. "Men Are So Easy" (bonus track on special edition) - 4:04
14. "Delirious Love" (featuring Brian Wilson) (bonus track on special edition) - 3:23

== Personnel ==
- Neil Diamond – vocals, guitars
- Larry Knechtel – acoustic piano
- Roger Joseph Manning Jr. – acoustic piano
- Benmont Tench – acoustic piano, organ
- Patrick Warren – Chamberlin
- Billy Preston – organ, Hammond organ (4, 9, 11)
- Mike Campbell – guitars, horn and string arrangements, conductor
- Smokey Hormel – guitars
- Pat McLaughlin – guitars
- Jason Sinay – guitars
- Jonny Polonsky – guitars, upright bass
- Lenny Castro – percussion
- Jimmie Haskell – horn and string arrangements (4)
- Brian Wilson – vocals (14)

== Production ==
- Rick Rubin – producer
- Greg Fidelman – recording, mixing
- Jason Lader – recording
- Andrew Scheps – recording
- Mark Linett – additional recording
- Greg Burns – assistant engineer
- Chris Holmes – assistant engineer
- Pete Martinez – assistant engineer
- Jim Monti – assistant engineer
- Dana Nielsen – assistant engineer
- Erich Talaba – assistant engineer
- Vlado Meller – mastering at Sony Mastering (New York City, New York)
- Lindsey Chase – production coordinator
- Sam Cole – production coordinator
- Reina Katzenberger – art direction, design
- Martin Atkins – photography

== Charts ==
=== Weekly charts ===
| Chart (2005–2006) | Peak position |
|---|---|
| Australian Albums (ARIA) | 40 |
| Austrian Albums (Ö3 Austria) | 11 |
| Belgian Albums (Ultratop Flanders) | 6 |
| Belgian Albums (Ultratop Wallonia) | 86 |
| Dutch Albums (Album Top 100) | 10 |
| German Albums (Offizielle Top 100) | 20 |
| Irish Albums (IRMA) | 16 |
| Italian Albums (FIMI) | 82 |
| New Zealand Albums (RMNZ) | 40 |
| Swiss Albums (Schweizer Hitparade) | 43 |
| UK Albums (Official Charts) | 5 |
| US Billboard 200 | 4 |
| US Indie Store Album Sales (Billboard) | 13 |

=== Year-end charts ===
| Chart (2006) | Peak position |
|---|---|
| Dutch Albums (Album Top 100) | 99 |
| UK Albums (OCC) | 101 |
| US Billboard 200 | 161 |

== Certifications ==
| Region | Certification | Certified units/sales |
|---|---|---|
| Australia (ARIA) | Gold | 50,000 |
| Canada (Music Canada) | Gold | 50,000^{^} |
| Germany | — | 45,000 |
| Ireland (IRMA) | Gold | 7,500^{^} |
| United Kingdom (BPI) | Gold | 200,000 |
| United States (RIAA) | Gold | 571,000 |
^{^} Shipments figures based on certification alone.
