= Beautiful Noise =

Studio album by Neil Diamond
- Released: June 11, 1976
- Recorded: 1975–1976
- Studios: Shangri La Studio, Los Angeles; Kendun Recorders, Los Angeles; Village Recorders, Los Angeles
- Genres: Folk pop; rock; R&B; soul
- Length: 37:40
- Label: Columbia
- Producer: Robbie Robertson

Neil Diamond chronology
Serenade (1974)	Beautiful Noise (1976)	And the Singer Sings His Song (1976)

Singles from Beautiful Noise
- 1. "If You Know What I Mean" Released: June 1976

Professional ratings
Review scores
Source	Rating
AllMusic	4/5 stars
Christgau's Record Guide	C+

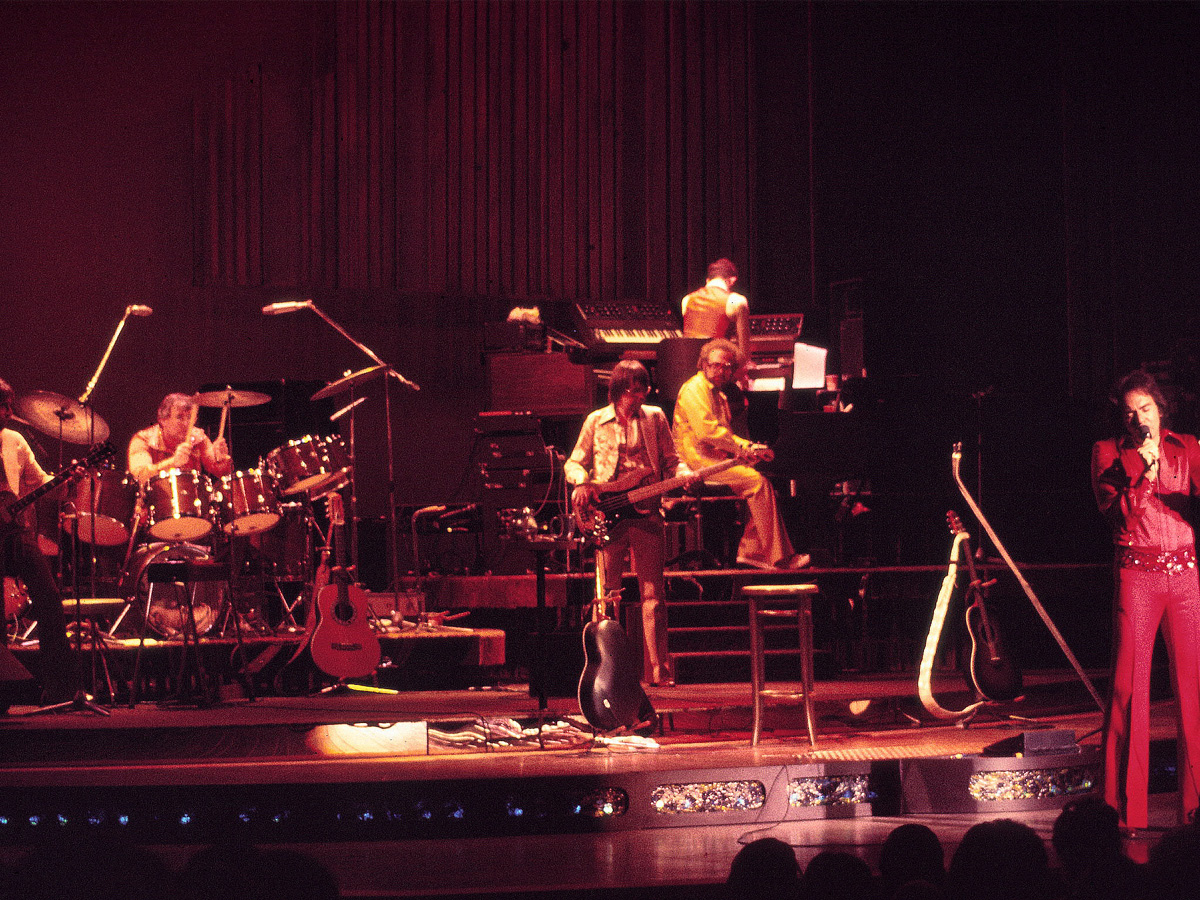
Diamond performing live in support of Beautiful Noise in 1976

Beautiful Noise is the tenth album by American singer-songwriter Neil Diamond, released in 1976. Diamond's third album with Columbia Records, it was produced by Robbie Robertson, known for his work with The Band. Garth Hudson of The Band also contributed organ to several songs on the album. Diamond performed the album track "Dry Your Eyes" with The Band at their farewell show The Last Waltz, which was filmed by director Martin Scorsese and made into a 1978 documentary of the same title.

== History ==
Beautiful Noise marked a radical departure in production, style, arrangements and compositional diversity for Diamond. It was billed at the time of its release as something of a "comeback" album for the artist and did mark a new and highly productive phase of his recording and touring career.

The album produced three singles: "If You Know What I Mean", "Don't Think... Feel", and the title track, "Beautiful Noise". "If You Know What I Mean" was a No. 1 hit on Billboard's Easy Listening chart and reached No. 11 on the US Hit Parade. "Don't Think... Feel" reached No. 43 in the U.S. charts, while "Beautiful Noise" reached No. 13 on the UK Singles Chart, No. 7 in South Africa and No. 6 in the then West Germany. It also made it to No. 6 in Switzerland, No. 8 in Austria, No. 3 in the Netherlands and No. 6 in Flemish Belgium.

Cash Box said of the title song "orchestration begins the tune as Diamond steps in with his well-known vocal style includes a revolving carousel organ." Record World said that "an accordion lends a distinct, atmospheric sound" to the track.

The song "Stargazer" would receive attention in 2026 with its use in the film Project Hail Mary.

== Track listing ==
All tracks composed by Neil Diamond, except "Dry Your Eyes" by Diamond and Robbie Robertson.

Side one
No.	Title	Length
1.	"Beautiful Noise"	3:24
2.	"Stargazer"	2:41
3.	"Lady-Oh"	3:51
4.	"Don't Think... Feel"	3:26
5.	"Surviving the Life"	3:42
6.	"If You Know What I Mean"	3:30

Side two
No.	Title	Length
1.	"Street Life"	3:00
2.	"Home Is a Wounded Heart"	2:40
3.	"Jungletime"	3:10
4.	"Signs"	4:17
5.	"Dry Your Eyes"	3:23

== Personnel ==
- Neil Diamond – vocals, acoustic guitar, rhythm guitar, dobro
- Richard Bennett, Jesse Ed Davis, Robbie Robertson – guitar
- Bob Boucher – bass guitar, ARP
- Larry Knechtel – piano, Fender Rhodes
- Alan Lindgren – piano, synthesizer
- Dennis St. John – drums, percussion
- David Paich – Fender Rhodes, piano
- Garth Hudson – Hammond organ, Lowrey organ
- Jim Keltner, Russ Kunkel – drums
- Jim Gordon – drums, congas, harmony vocals
- James Newton Howard – ARP, synthesizer
- Joe Lala – percussion, tambourine, congas
- Dr. John – Hammond organ
- Bob James – piano, arrangement, Fender Rhodes
- Tommy Morgan – harmonica
- Bob Findley – trumpet
- Jerome Richardson – flute, clarinet
- Linda Press – backing vocals
- Nick DeCaro – arrangements, accordion
- Frank DeCaro - music contractor

== Charts ==
=== Weekly charts ===
Chart (1976)	Peak position
Australian Albums (Kent Music Report)	1
Austrian Albums (Ö3 Austria)	1
Canada Top Albums/CDs (RPM)	5
Dutch Albums (Album Top 100)	1
German Albums (Offizielle Top 100)	1
New Zealand Albums (RMNZ)	1
Swedish Albums (Sverigetopplistan)	33
UK Albums (Official Charts)	10
US Billboard 200	4

=== Year-end charts ===
Chart (1976)	Peak position
Australian Albums (Kent Music Report)	5
Austrian Albums (Ö3 Austria)	6
Dutch Albums (Album Top 100)	4
German Albums (Offizielle Top 100)	26
New Zealand Albums (RMNZ)	4
UK Albums (OCC)	42
Chart (1977)	Peak position
German Albums (Offizielle Top 100)	18

== Certifications ==
Region	Certification	Certified units/sales
Australia (ARIA)	Gold	20,000^{^}
Canada (Music Canada)	Platinum	100,000^{^}
Germany (BVMI)	Gold	250,000^{^}
Netherlands (NVPI)	Gold	50,000^{^}
New Zealand (RMNZ)	5× Gold	37,500^{^}
South Africa (RISA)	Gold	25,000^{*}
United Kingdom (BPI)	Gold	100,000^{^}
United States (RIAA)	Platinum	1,000,000^{^}
^{*} Sales figures based on certification alone.^{^} Shipments figures based on certification alone.
