= Touching You, Touching Me =

Studio album by Neil Diamond
- Released: November 14, 1969
- Recorded: 1969
- Genres: Pop; rock
- Length: 30:54 (US); 33:58 (UK)
- Label: Uni
- Producers: Tom Catalano, Tommy Cogbill

Neil Diamond chronology
Brother Love's Travelling Salvation Show (1969)	Touching You, Touching Me (1969)	Gold: Recorded Live at the Troubadour (1970)

Professional ratings
Review scores
Source	Rating
Allmusic	4/5 stars

Touching You, Touching Me is the fifth studio album by American singer-songwriter Neil Diamond. It was the first one since 1966 to feature renditions of other people's material as well as his own. It included a major hit that had already charted, "Holly Holy" (#6), and a minor one, "Until It's Time for You to Go" (#53). The album itself reached #30 on the Billboard album chart and was certified gold. Lee Holdridge was the arranger and conductor.

Despite its title coming from lyrics for the hit song "Sweet Caroline", that track was not included on the US version as it was already on the previous Brother Love's Travelling Salvation Show album. On the UK edition, "Sweet Caroline" was included as the last track on Side A.

== Track listing ==
All songs written by Neil Diamond, except where noted.

Side one
No.	Title	Writer(s)	Length
1.	"Everybody's Talkin'"	Fred Neil	2:46
2.	"Mr. Bojangles"	Jerry Jeff Walker	4:53
3.	"Smokey Lady"		2:40
4.	"Holly Holy"		4:40
5.	"Sweet Caroline" (On UK edition only)		3:30

Side two
No.	Title	Writer(s)	Length
1.	"Both Sides Now"	Joni Mitchell	3:30
2.	"And the Singer Sings His Song"		3:37
3.	"Ain't No Way"		2:41
4.	"New York Boy"		2:38
5.	"Until It's Time for You to Go"	Buffy Sainte-Marie	3:29

== Charts ==
Chart (1969–1970)	Peak position
Australian Albums (Kent Music Report)	9
Canada Top Albums/CDs (RPM)	21
US Billboard 200	30

== Certifications ==
Region	Certification	Certified units/sales
United States (RIAA)	Gold	500,000^{^}
^{^} Shipments figures based on certification alone.
