= Two-Bit Manchild =

Single by Neil Diamond

from the album Velvet Gloves and Spit
- B-side: "Broad Old Woman (6 AM Insanity)"
- Released: 1968
- Recorded: 1968
- Genre: Pop, Rock
- Length: 3:04
- Label: Uni
- Songwriter: Neil Diamond
- Producers: Tom Catalano, Neil Diamond

Neil Diamond singles chronology
"Brooklyn Roads"	"Two-Bit Manchild"	"Shilo"

"Two-Bit Manchild" is a song written and performed by Neil Diamond. It appears on Neil's 1968 album Velvet Gloves and Spit, and was released as an A-side with a B-side of "Broad Old Woman (6 a.m. Insanity)". It is a "strong and interesting" song according to Robert Jamieson.

"Two-Bit Manchild" also appears on the Neil Diamond compilation albums Glory Road 1968-1972, Play Me: The Complete Uni Studio Recordings Plus, Gold, and Reflections.

== Reception ==
Allmusic recommends "Two-Bit Manchild" as one of the top four songs on the album Velvet Gloves and Spit, calling it, "a fascinating adaptation of his Brill Building-era sound to a personal/introspective lyric and approach (picture the Monkees' sound melded to a singer/songwriter persona)." It has also been described as "brilliant and very Bang-ish" and a "jewel". The opening riff is also reminiscent of Day Tripper by The Beatles.

Billboard described the single as having a "driving rock groove" and called it a "powerful follow-up" to Neil's previous single "Brooklyn Roads." Cash Box said that it is "danceable and sales oriented" with "a touch of Latin and a fine hand-clapping support."

== Debut ==
Neil Diamond performed "Two-Bit Manchild" on July 2, 1968, on Showcase 68. Officially released as a 45 single in July, 1968 with the B-Side "Broad Old Woman (6 a.m. Insanity)" as UNI 55075. It eventually reached No.66 on the charts.

At least two versions of the 45 sleeve were released. One featured a picture of Neil Diamond. The other featured a swirly, psychedelic graphic. It was arranged by Renzetti, Altman, Cerone, Richards and Sandler.

== International release ==
In the United Kingdom, "Two-Bit Manchild" was also released with Broad Old Woman (6 a.m. Insanity) as the B-Side. It was released by MCA records in August 1968, and licensed by MCA INC. USA as UK MCA MU 1033. It did not chart in the U.K.

== Subsequent history ==
The copyright has been registered twice, first as EP0000284487 on December 12, 1970, and again as RE0000772415 on January 2, 1998.

The poor chart performance of "Two-Bit Manchild" forebode the poor chart performance of Velvet Gloves and Spit. "Two-Bit Manchild" is now considered one of the "obscurities" of Neil Diamond's catalog. "Two-Bit Manchild" was covered by Australian pop singer Johnny Farnham on his second studio album Everybody Oughta Sing a Song released on EMI Records in November 1968. The song is now covered by the Neil Diamond coverers Nine Inch Neils, and Mike Tyler.

== Non-performance on American Idol ==
On April 29, 2008, contestants on American Idol sang Neil Diamond penned songs. One song they did not perform was "Two-Bit Manchild". Perhaps, as New York suggested, it was too "on-the-nose." Some were "desperate" that David Cook perform it.
