= If You Know What I Mean =

Single by Neil Diamond

from the album Beautiful Noise
- B-side: "Street Life"
- Released: June 1976
- Genre: Pop rock
- Length: 3:41
- Label: Columbia Records
- Songwriter: Neil Diamond
- Producer: Robbie Robertson

Neil Diamond singles chronology
"The Last Picasso" (1975)	"If You Know What I Mean" (1976)	"Don't Think... Feel" (1976)

"If You Know What I Mean" is a song written and recorded by Neil Diamond. It is a track from Diamond's 1976 album, Beautiful Noise, and was his third number 1 on the Easy Listening chart, where it spent two weeks. "If You Know What I Mean" went to number 1 for two nonconsecutive weeks and peaked at number 11 on the Billboard Hot 100. In Canada, the song reached number 19 on the pop singles chart and hit number 1 on the Adult Contemporary chart.

== Background ==
Billboard described "If You Know What I Mean" as a "powerful ballad", stating that Diamond sings with more emotion than he had in the recent past, and also praised Robbie Robertson's production. Cash Box said that the song "has a couple of diverse, yet distinct musical moods" and that "the chorus, underscored by a first class string section, builds the song up to an emotional peak."

Diamond has stated that the song is a "tender recollection" of a relationship in his teens, in which he successfully seduced a significantly older woman.

== Chart history ==
=== Weekly charts ===
Chart (1976)	Peak position
Australia (Kent Music Report)	27
Belgium (Ultratop 50 Flanders)	9
Belgium (Ultratop 50 Wallonia)	38
Canada RPM Top Singles	19
Canada RPM Adult Contemporary	1
Netherlands (Dutch Top 40)	7
Netherlands (Single Top 100)	5
New Zealand (Recorded Music NZ)	8
UK Singles (Official Charts)	35
US Billboard Hot 100	11
US Adult Contemporary (Billboard)	1
US Cash Box Top 100	16
West Germany (GfK)	33

=== Year-end charts ===
Chart (1976)	Position
Belgium (Ultratop Flanders)	82
Canada RPM Top Singles	153
Netherlands (Dutch Top 40)	84
Netherlands (Single Top 100)	76
US (Joel Whitburn's Pop Annual)	98
US Adult Contemporary (Billboard)	6

== See also ==
- List of number-one adult contemporary singles of 1976 (U.S.)
