= Don't Think... Feel =

Single by Neil Diamond

from the album Beautiful Noise
- B-side: "Home Is a Wounded Heart"
- Released: September 1976
- Label: Columbia
- Songwriter: Neil Diamond
- Producer: Robbie Robertson

"Don't Think... Feel" is a 1976 song by Neil Diamond from the album Beautiful Noise. It was released as a single in October 1976 and reached #43 in the US Hit Parade. The B-side was "Home is a Wounded Heart".

The "Caribbean-flavored track" features Dr. John on Hammond organ and Jerome Richardson on flute. The song was a take on hippie philosophy with the words "Don't think, feel. Ain't no big deal. Make it real. And don't think, feel."

Cash Box said that "Diamond sings the lyric with an exotic flavor, almost reggae, and the chorus is a dynamite hook." Record World said the song "has a carnival-like calypso flavor that feels good."

The title and message of the song attracted comment both positive and negative.

== Chart history ==
Chart (1976)	Peak position
Canada RPM Adult Contemporary	5
U.S. Billboard Hot 100	43
U.S. Billboard Adult Contemporary	4
U.S. Cash Box Top 100	77
