= On the Way to the Sky (song) =

Song performed by Neil Diamond

Single by Neil Diamond

from the album On the Way to the Sky
- B-side: "Save Me"
- Released: February 1982
- Recorded: 1981
- Genre: Pop
- Length: 3:35 (single version); 3:47 (album version)
- Label: Columbia
- Songwriters: Neil Diamond; Carole Bayer Sager
- Producers: Neil Diamond; Dennis St. John

Neil Diamond singles chronology
"Yesterday's Songs" (1981)	"On the Way to the Sky" (1982)	"Be Mine Tonight" (1982)

"On the Way to the Sky" is a song written by Neil Diamond and Carole Bayer Sager.

The song was first released in April of 1981 on Bayer Sager's solo album Sometimes Late at Night.

Diamond recorded the song the same year, and made it the title track of his fourteenth studio album. Diamond's version was released in October of 1981 and peaked on the Billboard Hot 100 at #27 in March 1982.

Billboard said that "A downbeat melody line gives this track its emotional pull."

== Charts ==
Chart (1982)	Peak position
US Billboard Hot 100	27
US Billboard Adult Contemporary	4
Canadian RPM Adult Contemporary	1
