= Headed for the Future =

1986 studio album by Neil Diamond

Studio album by Neil Diamond
- Released: March 11, 1986
- Recorded: 1985
- Studios: Ocean Way Recording, Conway Studios, Soundcastle and Grover Helsley Recording Inc. (Hollywood, California); Bill Schnee Studios (North Hollywood, California); Hitsville Recording Studios, Lion Share Studios and Wonderland Studios (Los Angeles, California); Chartmaker Studios (Malibu, California)
- Genre: Pop rock
- Length: 39:28
- Label: Columbia
- Producers: Neil Diamond; Tom Hensley; Alan Lindgren; David Foster; Burt Bacharach; Carole Bayer Sager; Maurice White; Greg Phillinganes; Stevie Wonder

Neil Diamond chronology
Primitive (1984)	Headed for the Future (1986)	Hot August Night II (1987)

Headed for the Future is the seventeenth studio album by Neil Diamond, released in March 1986 on Columbia Records. The album went to number 20 on the US Billboard 200. Headed for the Future has also been certified Gold in the US by the RIAA.

== Overview ==
The album's title track reached the top 10 on the Billboard Adult Contemporary chart. Another single, "The Story of My Life", reached No. 11 on the same chart.

== Critical reception ==
Professional ratings
Review scores
Source	Rating
AllMusic	2/5 stars
Detroit Free Press	(favourable)
The Mercury News	8/10

Rick Shefchik of The Mercury News found that "Diamond records albums like a man easing himself into a cold lake for a swim. He seems reluctant to get started and unsure of how to go about it, but once he takes the plunge, his natural instincts take over."

== Track listing ==
Side one
No.	Title	Writer(s)	Length
1.	"Headed for the Future"	Neil Diamond, Tom Hensley, Alan Lindgren	4:05
2.	"The Man You Need"	Diamond, David Foster	4:01
3.	"I'll See You on the Radio (Laura)"	Burt Bacharach, Diamond, Carole Bayer Sager	3:48
4.	"Stand Up for Love"	Martin Page, Greg Phillinganes, Maurice White	2:55
5.	"It Should Have Been Me"	Bryan Adams, Jim Vallance	4:27

Side two
No.	Title	Writer(s)	Length
6.	"Lost in Hollywood"	Diamond, Stevie Wonder	4:18
7.	"The Story of My Life"	Diamond	3:41
8.	"Angel"	Bobby Caldwell, Steve Kipner	4:01
9.	"Me Beside You"	Bacharach, Diamond, Bayer Sager	3:54
10.	"Love Doesn't Live Here Anymore"	Caldwell, William Meyers	4:18

== Personnel ==
- Neil Diamond – vocals
- Tom Hensley – acoustic piano (1, 7), synthesizers (1, 7)
- Alan Lindgren – acoustic piano (1, 7), synthesizers (1, 7)
- David Foster – all keyboards (2, 5), synthesizers (9)
- David Boruff – keyboard programming (2, 5), saxophone (2)
- Randy Kerber – keyboards (3, 9)
- Burt Bacharach – synthesizers (3, 9)
- Robbie Buchanan – synthesizers (3)
- Todd Cochran – Emulator programming (3)
- Greg Phillinganes – keyboards (4, 8, 10), synthesizers (4, 8, 10), backing vocals (4)
- Bo Tomlyn – keyboards (4, 8, 10), synthesizers (4, 8, 10)
- Stevie Wonder – acoustic piano (6), synthesizers (6), drums (6), backing vocals (6)
- Herbie Hancock – synthesizer solo (6)
- Robert Arbittier – synthesizer programming (6)
- Bob Bralove – synthesizer programming (6)
- Nyle Steiner – additional synthesizers (8)
- Richard Bennett – guitars (1, 7)
- Hadley Hockensmith – guitars (1, 7)
- Doug Rhone – guitars (1, 7)
- Michael Landau – guitars (2, 5)
- Dann Huff – guitars (3, 5, 9), additional guitars (8, 10)
- Steve Lukather – guitars (4)
- Bobby Caldwell – guitars (8, 10), backing vocals (8)
- Reinie Press – bass guitar (1, 7)
- Neil Stubenhaus – bass guitar (3, 8–10)
- Nathan East – bass guitar (4)
- Jason Scheff – bass guitar (5), backing vocals (5)
- Ron Tutt – drums (1, 7)
- Tris Imboden – drum overdubs (2, 5)
- Carlos Vega – drums (3, 9)
- John Robinson – drums (4, 8, 10)
- Vince Charles – percussion (1, 7), steel drums (1, 7)
- King Errisson – percussion (1, 7), congas (1, 7)
- Paulinho da Costa – percussion (3, 8–10)
- Clare Fischer – string arrangements (10)
- Assa Drori – concertmaster (10)
- Linda Press – backing vocals (1)
- Bill Champlin – backing vocals (2, 5)
- Stephanie Spruill – backing vocals (3, 9)
- Julia Tillman Waters – backing vocals (3, 9)
- Maxine Willard Waters – backing vocals (3, 9)
- Marva Barnes – backing vocals (4)
- Maurice White – backing vocals (4, 8)
- Dwayne Roberson – backing vocals (6)
- Vince Unto – backing vocals (6)
- Philip Williams – backing vocals (6)
- David Lasley – backing vocals (9)

== Production ==
- Neil Diamond – producer (1, 7)
- Tom Henley – producer (1), arrangements (1)
- Alan Lindgren – producer (1), arrangements (1, 7)
- David Foster – producer (2, 5), arrangements (2, 5)
- Burt Bacharach – producer (3, 9), arrangements (3, 9)
- Carole Bayer Sager – producer (3, 9)
- Maurice White – producer (4, 8, 10), arrangements (4, 8, 10)
- Greg Phillinganes – co-producer (4, 8, 10), arrangements (4, 8, 10)
- Stevie Wonder – producer (6), arrangements (6)
- Sam Cole – album coordinator, production coordinator
- Frank DeCaro – production coordinator, music contractor
- Chris Earthy – production coordinator
- Geri White – production coordinator
- Ned Brown – production assistant
- Barry Cardinale – production assistant
- Larry E. Williams – production assistant
- Alison Zanetos – production assistant
- David Kirschner – art direction, design
- Jan Weinberg – design
- Herb Ritts – photography

Technical credits

- Bernie Grundman – mastering at Bernie Grundman Mastering (Hollywood, California)
- John Arrias – recording
- Bill Bottrell – mixing
- Humberto Gatica – recording, mixing
- Mick Guzauski – recording, mixing
- Gary Olazabal – mixing
- John Patterson – recording
- Tom Perry – recording
- David Schober – recording
- Allen Sides – recording, mixing
- Bino Espinoza – assistant engineer
- Dan Garcia – assistant engineer
- Bob Harlan – assistant engineer
- Darren Klein – assistant engineer
- Bob Loftus – assistant engineer
- Steve MacMillan – assistant engineer
- Richard McKernon – assistant engineer
- Claudio Ordenes – assistant engineer
- Mike Ross – assistant engineer
- Karen Siegel – assistant engineer
- Jeffrey "Woody" Woodruff – assistant engineer

== Charts ==
Chart (1986)	Peak position
Australian Albums (Kent Music Report)	72
Canada Top Albums/CDs (RPM)	51
Dutch Albums (Album Top 100)	33
German Albums (Offizielle Top 100)	65
UK Albums (Official Charts)	36
US Billboard 200	20

== Certifications ==
Region	Certification	Certified units/sales
United States (RIAA)	Gold	500,000^{^}
^{^} Shipments figures based on certification alone.
