= I've Been This Way Before =

Single by Neil Diamond

from the album Serenade
- B-side: "Reggae Strut"
- Released: 1974 (US)
- Genre: Soft rock
- Length: 3:08
- Label: Columbia
- Songwriter(s): Neil Diamond
- Producer(s): Tom Catalano

Neil Diamond singles chronology
"Longfellow Serenade" (1974)	"I've Been This Way Before" (1974)	"The Last Picasso" (1975)

"I've Been This Way Before" is a song written and performed by Neil Diamond. It was released as the second single from Diamond's 1974 album Serenade. "I've Been This Way Before" was Neil Diamond's third No. 1 on the Easy Listening chart and also peaked at No. 34 on the Billboard Hot 100 chart.

Billboard magazine stated that the song was "stronger lyrically" than recent Neil Diamond songs and also praised the vocal performance and the arrangement. Cash Box said, "This moody ballad gleams," describing, "A simple piano opening builds lovingly into a rich mix of strings and things with Diamond's voice rising confidently above it all."

== See also ==
- List of number-one adult contemporary singles of 1975 (U.S.)
