= Velvet Gloves and Spit =

Studio album by Neil Diamond
- Released: October 15, 1968
- Recorded: 1968
- Genre: Pop, rock
- Length: 27:20
- Label: Uni
- Producer: Tom Catalano, Chip Taylor, Neil Diamond

Neil Diamond chronology
| Just For You (1967) | Velvet Gloves and Spit (1968) | Neil Diamond's Greatest Hits (1968) |

Alternate cover
- Re-issue sleeve

Velvet Gloves and Spit is the third album by Neil Diamond. His first for MCA's Uni label, it included three low-charting singles: "Brooklyn Roads" (No. 58), "Two-Bit Manchild" (No. 66) and "Sunday Sun" (No. 68).

Upon its initial release in 1968, the album had 10 songs. After the success of Diamond's next three albums, it was re-issued in October 1970 with a new sleeve and included a remake of "Shilo", a song that had previously been recorded for Bang Records and had appeared on the preceding album, Just For You. His motivation for doing this was the release of the song as a single by his old record label with a new backing track and different vocal take recorded at Chips Moman's American Studios in Memphis, and its chart position at No. 24 outselling Diamond's concurrently released single "Until It's Time for You to Go", which reached No. 53.

The album sleeve states that "Much credit for 'The Pot Smoker's Song' must go to the kids of Phoenix House in New York City. Without the cooperation and frankness of these young ex-drug addicts who are still struggling to find their way back, this 'song' never could have been done." On early UK copies, "The Pot Smoker's Song" was replaced by a B-side titled "Broad Old Woman (6 A.M. Insanity)".

Cash Box called "Brooklyn Roads" a "nostalgia filled glimpse of the 'good old days' of childhood" that has "solid vocal and lyrical impact" as well as "excellent production work and reasonable dance appeal." Record World called it "a stirring, autobiographical song with Thomas Wolfe overtones the kids will love." "Brooklyn Roads" reached #58 on the Billboard Hot 100 and peaked at No. 34 in Canada.

Record World called "Sunday Sun" a "walking-talking song" and described it as a "rhythmic, hypnotic new ditty." "Sunday Sun" reached No. 68 on the Billboard Hot 100.

Professional ratings
Review scores
| Source | Rating |
|---|---|
| Allmusic | link |

== Track listing ==
All tracks written by Neil Diamond.

Side one
| No. | Title | Length |
|---|---|---|
| 1. | "Sunday Sun" | 2:47 |
| 2. | "A Modern Day Version of Love" | 2:53 |
| 3. | "Honey-Drippin' Times" | 2:03 |
| 4. | "The Pot Smoker's Song" | 4:04 |
| 5. | "Brooklyn Roads" | 3:40 |

Side two
| No. | Title | Length |
|---|---|---|
| 1. | "Two-Bit Manchild" | 3:07 |
| 2. | "Holiday Inn Blues" | 3:16 |
| 3. | "Practically Newborn" | 3:31 |
| 4. | "Knackelflerg" | 2:24 |
| 5. | "Merry-Go-Round" | 3:33 |

1970 re-release

Side one
| No. | Title | Length |
|---|---|---|
| 1. | "Two-Bit Manchild" | 3:07 |
| 2. | "A Modern Day Version of Love" | 2:53 |
| 3. | "Honey-Drippin' Times" | 2:03 |
| 4. | "The Pot Smoker's Song" | 4:04 |
| 5. | "Brooklyn Roads" | 3:40 |

Side two
| No. | Title | Length |
|---|---|---|
| 1. | "Shilo" | 2:58 |
| 2. | "Sunday Sun" | 2:47 |
| 3. | "Holiday Inn Blues" | 3:16 |
| 4. | "Practically Newborn" | 3:31 |
| 5. | "Knackelflerg" | 2:24 |
| 6. | "Merry-Go-Round" | 3:33 |

=== Arrangements ===
Artie Schroeck (tracks: A5), Don Costa (tracks: A1 to A3), Don Hockett (tracks: B4), Howard Johnson (tracks: B2), Joe Renzetti (tracks: B5, B1), Stuart Scharf (tracks: B3)
