= Hello Again (Neil Diamond song) =

Single by Neil Diamond

from the album The Jazz Singer
- B-side: "Amazed and Confused"
- Released: January 1981
- Recorded: 1980
- Genre: Pop
- Length: 3:35 (single version), 4:04 (album version)
- Label: Capitol
- Songwriters: Neil Diamond; Alan Lindgren
- Producer: Bob Gaudio

Neil Diamond singles chronology
| "Love on the Rocks" (1980) | "Hello Again" (1981) | "America" (1981) |

"Hello Again" is a song written by Neil Diamond and Alan Lindgren that appeared in the 1980 movie The Jazz Singer, and was performed by Diamond on the soundtrack album to the film. It was also released as a single and reached No. 6 on the Billboard Hot 100 and No. 3 on Billboard's Adult Contemporary chart. Billboard also ranked as the 70th top pop single for 1981. In the UK, the song peaked at No. 51. The song also peaked at No. 18 in Ireland.

== Background ==
"Hello Again" was described by Neil Diamond biographer Laura Jackson as a "slow tender ballad." AllMusic critic Johnny Loftus considers it Diamond's "signature late-career ballad." Author T. Mike Childs rated it as a "terrific" ballad. Film reviewer Joe Peacock described "Hello Again" as being "keenly affecting to the emotions."

Billboard critic Vicki Pipkin wrote that Diamond's performance of the song in The Jazz Singer is "poignant." Record World said that "Diamond's deep tenor resonates to maximum dramatic intensity, with a monumental string/piano arrangement backdrop." Pittsburgh Press music editor Carl Apone said that Diamond was at his best in The Jazz Singer in the songs "Hello Again" and "Love on the Rocks."

== Other uses ==
The song was used in the film Saving Silverman. It has been covered by several artists and orchestras, including Celtic Thunder, Donny Osmond, Regine Velasquez and Steve Cherelle.

On season 7 of American Idol, Syesha Mercado sang this song. It was week 11 and there were only five contestants left for what was Neil Diamond week.

== Charts ==
| Year-end chart (1981) | Rank |
|---|---|
| US Top Pop Singles (Billboard) | 70 |

== Certifications ==
| Region | Certification | Certified units/sales |
|---|---|---|
| United Kingdom (BPI) | Silver | 200,000^{‡} |
^{‡} Sales+streaming figures based on certification alone.
