= Three Chord Opera =

Studio album by Neil Diamond
- Released: July 24, 2001
- Recorded: 2000–01
- Studio: Arch Angel Studios (Los Angeles, California); Sony Pictures Studios (Culver City, California); Conway Studios (Hollywood, California)
- Genre: Pop
- Length: 47:17
- Label: Columbia
- Producer: Peter Asher; Alan Lindgren

Neil Diamond chronology
The Neil Diamond Collection (1999)	Three Chord Opera (2001)	The Essential Neil Diamond (2001)

Professional ratings
Review scores
Source	Rating
AllMusic	3/5 stars

Three Chord Opera is the twenty-fifth studio album by Neil Diamond, released in 2001. It marked the first album since 1974's Serenade to consist solely of original material written solely by Diamond, and the first album of any original songs since 1996's country-themed Tennessee Moon where he co-wrote all but one of the songs.

The album also featured the song "I Believe in Happy Endings", written by Diamond for the 2001 comedy Saving Silverman in which he made a cameo.

The album reached number 15 on the Billboard 200 chart. "You are the Best Part of Me", reached No. 28 on the Billboard Adult Contemporary chart.

== Track listing ==
All songs written by Neil Diamond.

No.	Title	Length
1.	"I Haven't Played This Song in Years"	4:25
2.	"Don't Look Down"	3:08
3.	"I Believe in Happy Endings"	4:29
4.	"At the Movies"	3:39
5.	"Midnight Dream"	4:57
6.	"You Are the Best Part of Me"	4:02
7.	"Baby Let's Drive"	4:35
8.	"My Special Someone"	3:35
9.	"A Mission of Love"	4:15
10.	"Elijah's Song"	2:56
11.	"Leave a Little Room for God"	2:53
12.	"Turn Down the Lights"	4:23

== Personnel ==
Musicians and vocalists

- Neil Diamond – vocals
- Tom Hensley – acoustic piano (2, 3, 7, 10, 12), Fender Rhodes (6, 8, 11)
- Alan Lindgren – keyboards (2, 4, 9), horn arrangements (2, 7), acoustic piano (3, 9), drums (4), percussion programming (4), Hammond organ (7, 9–12)
- Marc Mann – Pro Tools and sequencing (3), percussion programming (9), backing vocals (9)
- Dominic Ordinaire – accordion (8)
- Hadley Hockensmith – acoustic guitar (1, 9), 12-string guitar (1), electric guitar (2, 5, 8, 9), guitars (3, 6, 7, 11, 12), guitar solo (8)
- Doug Rhone – electric guitar (1), acoustic guitar (2, 5), guitars (6, 8, 12), tiple (7, 11)
- Michael Thompson – electric guitar (1, 5, 7, 9), guitar solo (2), guitars (3, 4)
- JayDee Maness – pedal steel guitar (10)
- Reinie Press – bass (1–3, 5–10, 12)
- Chuck Domanico – bass (11)
- Ron Tutt – drums (1, 5, 7, 8, 10–12)
- Russ Kunkel – drums (2, 3, 6, 9)
- Peter Asher – percussion (1–3, 5, 6, 10, 12), percussion programming (9), backing vocals (9), autoharp (11, 12)
- Vince Charles – tambourine (1, 11), percussion (5, 7, 10), congas (6, 8), steel drums (6), marimba (8)
- Jeff Turzo – additional percussion programming (4)
- Don Markese – clarinet (1), baritone saxophone (2, 7)
- Larry Klimas – tenor saxophone (2, 7)
- Everette Harp – tenor sax solo (3)
- Daniel Fornero – trumpet (2, 7), trumpet solo (7)
- Ralf Rickert – trumpet (2, 7)
- Linda Press – harmony vocals (5)
- Colin Mitchell – backing vocals (9)
- Wendy Worth – backing vocals (9)
- Alvin Chea – backing vocals (10, 12)
- Craig Copeland – backing vocals (10, 12)
- Randy Crenshaw – backing vocals (10, 12)
- Robert Joyce – backing vocals (10, 12)
- Luana Jackman – choir master (11), vocal group contractor

Orchestral arrangements (Tracks 1, 3, 5 & 9)

- Alan Lindgren – arrangements and conductor
- Assa Drori – concertmaster

String quartet on "You Are the Best Part of Me"

- Alan Lindgren – arrangements
- Susie Katayama – cello
- Evan Wilson – viola
- Assa Drori – violin
- Shari Zippert – violin

Tower of Power Horns on "A Mission of Love"

- Stephen "Doc" Kupka – baritone saxophone
- Emilio Castillo – tenor saxophone
- Norbert Satchel – tenor saxophone
- Michael Bogart – trombone, trumpet
- Adolfo Acosta – trumpet
- Greg Adams – trumpet, horn arrangements

=== Production ===
- Peter Asher – producer
- Alan Lindgren – producer (1, 2, 4–8, 10–12)
- Bernie Becker – recording, mixing, mastering
- Colin Mitchell – recording assistant
- Alan Mason – mix assistant
- Bernie Becker Mastering (Van Nuys, California) – mastering location
- Sam Cole – production coordinator
- Ivy Skoff – production assistant
- Gabrielle Raumberger – art direction
- Samantha Ahdoot – design
- Rocky Schenck – photography
- Bill Whitten – stylist
- Jerry Kearns – hair
- Darla Albright – make-up

== Charts ==
Chart (2001)	Peak position
Australian Albums (ARIA)	3
UK Albums (OCC)	49
US Billboard 200	15

== Certifications ==
Region	Certification	Certified units/sales
Australia (ARIA)	Gold	35,000^{^}
United States (RIAA)	Gold	500,000^{^}
^{^} Shipments figures based on certification alone.
