= Love on the Rocks (song) =

Single by Neil Diamond

from the album The Jazz Singer
- B-side: "Acapulco"
- Released: October 1980
- Recorded: 1980
- Genre: Pop, soft rock
- Length: 3:40
- Label: Capitol
- Songwriters: Neil Diamond; Gilbert Bécaud
- Producer: Bob Gaudio

Neil Diamond singles chronology
"Dancing in the Street" (1980)	"Love on the Rocks" (1980)	"Hello Again" (1981)

Professional ratings
Review scores
Source	Rating
Billboard	(unrated)

"Love on the Rocks" is a song written by Neil Diamond and Gilbert Bécaud that appeared in the 1980 film The Jazz Singer and was performed by Diamond on the soundtrack album to the film. It was also released as a single and reached No. 2 on the Billboard Hot 100 for three weeks in January 1981. The song also made it to No. 3 on the Billboard Adult Contemporary chart. Billboard rated it as the 26th pop single overall for 1981. It was a moderate hit in the UK, reaching No. 17.

== Background and recording ==
"Love on the Rocks" was one of five collaborations between Diamond and Bécaud for The Jazz Singer. It began as "a bit of a lark", a "reggae-tinged" number called "Scotch on the Rocks" for Bécaud's drink of choice. (A demo recording of this version was released on Diamond's career retrospective In My Lifetime in 1997.) The writers saw its potential and it was rewritten as a more serious ballad.

In The Jazz Singer, English actor and singer Paul Nicholas, playing a loutish Billy Idol-like singer, performs a punk/new wave version of the song to the chagrin of Diamond's character, Jess Rubin.

== Reception ==
Billboard critic Vicki Pipkin called "Love on the Rocks" a "powerful ballad in true Diamond style." Billboard also called the song "one of Diamond's more powerful readings" and "a beautiful ballad featuring Diamond's patented smoky vocals." Record World said it has "enough drama and tension in each line to fill an entire album." Neil Diamond biographer Laura Jackson describes the lyrics as taking "a sometimes cynical look at a man who is trapped in a relationship and is disillusioned with life." AllMusic critic Johnny Loftus called it a "lite FM favorite" and "classic, raw-throated Neil." Author T. Mike Childs rated it as a "terrific" ballad. Pittsburgh Press music editor Carl Apone claimed that Diamond was at his best in The Jazz Singer in the songs "Hello Again" and "Love on the Rocks."

== Personnel ==
- Neil Diamond – guitar, lead vocals
- Richard Bennett – acoustic and electric guitar
- Reinie Press – bass
- Dennis St. John – drums
- King Errisson – percussion
- Alan Lindgren – synthesizer, piano, orchestra arrangements and conductor
- Tom Hensley – keyboards

== Charts ==
=== Weekly charts ===
Chart (1980–1981)	Peak position
Australia KMR	29
Belgium (Ultratop 50 Flanders)	12
Canada RPM Top Singles	11
Germany (GfK)	70
Ireland (IRMA)	10
Netherlands (Single Top 100)	26
New Zealand (Recorded Music NZ)	32
South Africa (Springbok)	1
Switzerland (Schweizer Hitparade)	9
UK Singles (Official Charts)	17
US Billboard Hot 100	2
US Adult Contemporary (Billboard)	3
US Cash Box Top 100	4

=== Year-end charts ===
Chart (1980)	Rank
US Cash Box	74

Chart (1981)	Rank
South Africa	7
US Billboard Hot 100	26

== Certifications ==
Region	Certification	Certified units/sales
United Kingdom (BPI)	Silver	200,000^{‡}
^{‡} Sales+streaming figures based on certification alone.

== Later interpretations ==
Soon after the release of the Diamond recording, "Love on the Rocks" was covered by Millie Jackson on her 1981 album Just a Lil' Bit Country, and Gladys Knight performed the number on the Tom Jones show, a rendition released on the album Great Solo Performances by Guest Artists from the Tom Jones Show, Vol. 1 in 1997. Co-writer Bécaud recorded the song in French as "L'Amour est mort" on his 1981 eponymous album. Markku Aro covered the song in Finnish as "Sateinen katu" on his 1981 album Mun suothan tulla vierees sun. The Darkness paid tribute to Diamond's "Love on the Rocks" with their own 2003 song "Love on the Rocks with No Ice".
