= Brother Love's Travelling Salvation Show =

Studio album by Neil Diamond
- Released: April 4, 1969
- Recorded: 1968–69
- Genres: Pop, rock
- Length: 38:41
- Label: Uni
- Producers: Tom Catalano, Chips Moman, Tommy Cogbill, Neil Diamond

Neil Diamond chronology
Neil Diamond's Greatest Hits (1968)	Brother Love's Travelling Salvation Show (1969)	Touching You, Touching Me (1969)

Alternate Cover
- Reissued as Sweet Caroline

Brother Love's Travelling Salvation Show is the fourth studio album by American singer-songwriter Neil Diamond, released in 1969. Four months after the title cut became a #22 hit, Diamond recorded and released a new single, "Sweet Caroline", which reached #4. Because of its popularity, this song was added to the end of later pressings of the album, which was also given a new sleeve with the album shown as Sweet Caroline/Brother Love's Travelling Salvation Show although the title was still written as Brother Love's Travelling Salvation Show on the label.

== Track listing ==
All songs written by Neil Diamond.

Side one
No.	Title	Length
1.	"Brother Love's Travelling Salvation Show"	3:27
2.	"Dig In"	2:41
3.	"River Runs, Newgrown Plums"	1:58
4.	"Juliet"	2:51
5.	"Long Gone"	3:18
6.	"And the Grass Won't Pay No Mind"	3:33

Side two
No.	Title	Length
1.	"Glory Road"	3:19
2.	"Deep in the Morning"	3:04
3.	"If I Never Knew Your Name"	3:17
4.	"Memphis Streets"	2:40
5.	"You're So Sweet, Horseflies Keep Hangin' 'Round Your Face"	3:13
6.	"Hurtin' You Don't Come Easy"	2:30
7.	"Sweet Caroline (Good Times Never Seemed So Good)" (added to re-issue pressings)	3:21

== Reception ==
Professional ratings
Review scores
Source	Rating
Allmusic	3/5 stars

In his Allmusic retrospective review, music critic William Ruhlmann observes, "At times, the album betrayed the speed with which it had been put together, with songs like 'Dig In' and 'River Runs, New Grown Plums' coming off more as unfinished sketches than developed compositions... Diamond may have been aware that the material was mostly second-rate."

== Charts ==
Chart (1969)	Peak position
US Billboard 200	82

== Certifications ==
Region	Certification	Certified units/sales
United States (RIAA)	Gold	500,000^{^}
^{^} Shipments figures based on certification alone.
