= America (Neil Diamond song) =

Song by Neil Diamond

Single by Neil Diamond

from the album The Jazz Singer
- B-side: "Songs of Life"
- Released: April 1981
- Recorded: 1980
- Genre: Pop
- Length: 3:27 (single version); 4:19 (album version)
- Label: Capitol
- Songwriter: Neil Diamond
- Producer: Bob Gaudio

Neil Diamond singles chronology
"Hello Again" (1981)	"America" (1981)	"Yesterday's Songs" (1981)

Audio
- "America" on YouTube

"America" is a song written and originally recorded by Neil Diamond, released in 1980 on the soundtrack album of Diamond's film The Jazz Singer. The song was a hit single in the United States in 1981, reaching number eight on the Billboard Hot 100, and was Diamond's sixth number one on the Adult Contemporary chart. Billboard also rated it the #62 pop single overall for 1981. Although the single version was a studio recording, overdubs of crowd cheering simulate the feel of a live performance.

As of June 2017, the song had sold 634,440 downloads in the United States since Nielsen started tracking sales.

== Background ==
The song's theme is a positive interpretation of the history of immigration to the United States, during both the early 1900s and the present. Combining Diamond's powerful melody, dynamic arrangement, and bombastic vocal, it ends with an interpolation of the traditional patriotic song "My Country, 'Tis of Thee".

In Diamond's concerts, the song is a very popular number both at home and abroad, with a large United States flag often displayed from the rafters on cue to the lyric "Every time that flag's unfurled / They're coming to America." The song was featured at the Stone Mountain Laser Show near Atlanta, Georgia.

The song has been used in a number of contexts, including as a theme song for Michael Dukakis' 1988 presidential campaign, the ending scene from Born in East L.A., and in promotion of the 1996 Olympics. Diamond also sang it at the centennial re-dedication of the Statue of Liberty and at Ball Arena in Denver on New Year's Eve 1999.

Shortly after the September 11 attacks, Diamond modified the lyrics to "America" slightly during live performances. Instead of "They're comin' to America," toward the end it became "Stand up for America." It was included on a memorandum listing songs deemed inappropriate by Clear Channel Communications following the September 11 attacks.

== Reception ==
Record World said that "Rumbling drums and Diamond's dramatic, upbeat vocal will incite waves of patriotic surges."

== Chart history ==
=== Weekly charts ===
Chart (1981)	Peak position
Canada RPM Top Singles	45
Canada RPM Adult Contemporary	15
U.S. Billboard Hot 100	8
U.S. Billboard Adult Contemporary	1
U.S. Cash Box Top 100	10

=== Year-end charts ===
Chart (1981)	Rank
U.S. Billboard Hot 100	62
U.S. Cash Box	61

== Certifications ==
Region	Certification	Certified units/sales
United Kingdom (BPI)	Silver	200,000^{‡}
^{‡} Sales+streaming figures based on certification alone.

== Cover version ==
New-age pianist David Lanz performed a cover of this song for his album Finding Paradise.

Zombi and Friends track 10 volume 1

== See also ==
- List of number-one adult contemporary singles of 1981 (U.S.)
