= Yesterday's Songs =

Single by Neil Diamond

from the album On the Way to the Sky
- B-side: "Guitar Heaven"
- Released: November 1981
- Genre: Pop
- Length: 2:51
- Label: Columbia
- Songwriter: Neil Diamond

Neil Diamond singles chronology
"America" (1981)	"Yesterday's Songs" (1981)	"On the Way to the Sky" (1982)

"Yesterday's Songs" is a 1981 single by Neil Diamond from his album On the Way to the Sky. The song was a major adult contemporary radio hit, spending six weeks at #1 on the U.S. Billboard chart and four weeks atop the Canadian Adult Contemporary chart. On the Billboard Hot 100, it peaked at #11. On the Canadian pop charts, the song reached #15. "Yesterday's Songs" is ranked as the 77th biggest American hit of 1982.

Record World said that "If the intriguing keyboard melody or snappy beat doesn't grab you, Diamond's spirited vocal romanticism will."

== Chart history ==
=== Weekly charts ===
Chart (1981–1982)	Peak position
Australia (Kent Music Report)	75
Canada RPM Adult Contemporary	1
Canada RPM Top Singles	15
U.S. Billboard Hot 100	11
U.S. Billboard Adult Contemporary	1
U.S. Cash Box Top 100	12

=== Year-end charts ===
Chart (1982)	Position
US Billboard Hot 100	77
US Adult Contemporary (Billboard)	4

== See also ==
- Neil Diamond discography
- List of Billboard Adult Contemporary number ones of 1981
