= Longfellow Serenade =

Single by Neil Diamond

from the album Serenade
- B-side: "Rosemary's Wine"
- Released: 1974 (US)
- Genre: Rock
- Length: 3:22
- Label: Columbia
- Songwriter: Neil Diamond
- Producer: Tom Catalano

Neil Diamond singles chronology
"Skybird" (1974)	"Longfellow Serenade" (1974)	"I've Been This Way Before" (1975)

"Longfellow Serenade" is the title of a 1974 song by the American singer-songwriter Neil Diamond. It was written by Diamond, produced by Tom Catalano, and included on Diamond's album Serenade.

"Longfellow Serenade" spent two weeks at No. 5 on the Billboard Hot 100 chart in November 1974. It was Diamond's second No. 1 on the Billboard Easy Listening chart, following his 1972 single, "Song Sung Blue". The song reached No. 1 in Switzerland and No. 2 in Germany.

Diamond described "Longfellow Serenade" in the liner notes to his 1996 compilation album, In My Lifetime: "Occasionally I like using a particular lyrical style which, in this case, lent itself naturally to telling the story of a guy who woos his woman with poetry." The title of the song is a reference to the 19th-century American poet Henry Wadsworth Longfellow. Diamond chose to reference Longfellow specifically after recalling an instance in which, while in his teens, Diamond had used one of the poet's works to successfully seduce a significantly older woman.

Cash Box called it a "powerful up-tempo ballad", saying, "Neil handles the tune with his usual expertise and rich smooth vocal." Record World said that Diamond "invokes a classic 19th century bard and turns in a true masterpiece of thought and performance perfection."

== Chart history ==
=== Weekly charts ===
Chart (1974–75)	Peak position
Australia (Kent Music Report)	7
Belgium (Ultratop 50 Flanders)	9
Belgium (Ultratop 50 Wallonia)	22
Canada RPM Adult Contemporary	1
Canada RPM Top Singles	7
Germany (GfK)	2
Netherlands (Single Top 100)	9
New Zealand (Recorded Music NZ)	29
South Africa (Springbok)	1
Switzerland (Schweizer Hitparade)	1
US Billboard Hot 100	5
US Adult Contemporary (Billboard)	1
U.S. Cash Box Top 100	4

=== Year-end charts ===
Chart (1974)	Rank
Australia (Kent Music Report)	68
Canada	85
U.S. (Joel Whitburn's Pop Annual)	67

Chart (1975)	Rank
South Africa	14
Switzerland	9
U.S. Billboard Easy Listening	36

== Cover versions ==
Petr Spálený – Velký Muž Serenád

== See also ==
- List of number-one adult contemporary singles of 1974 (U.S.)
