= List of UK top-ten singles in 1977 =

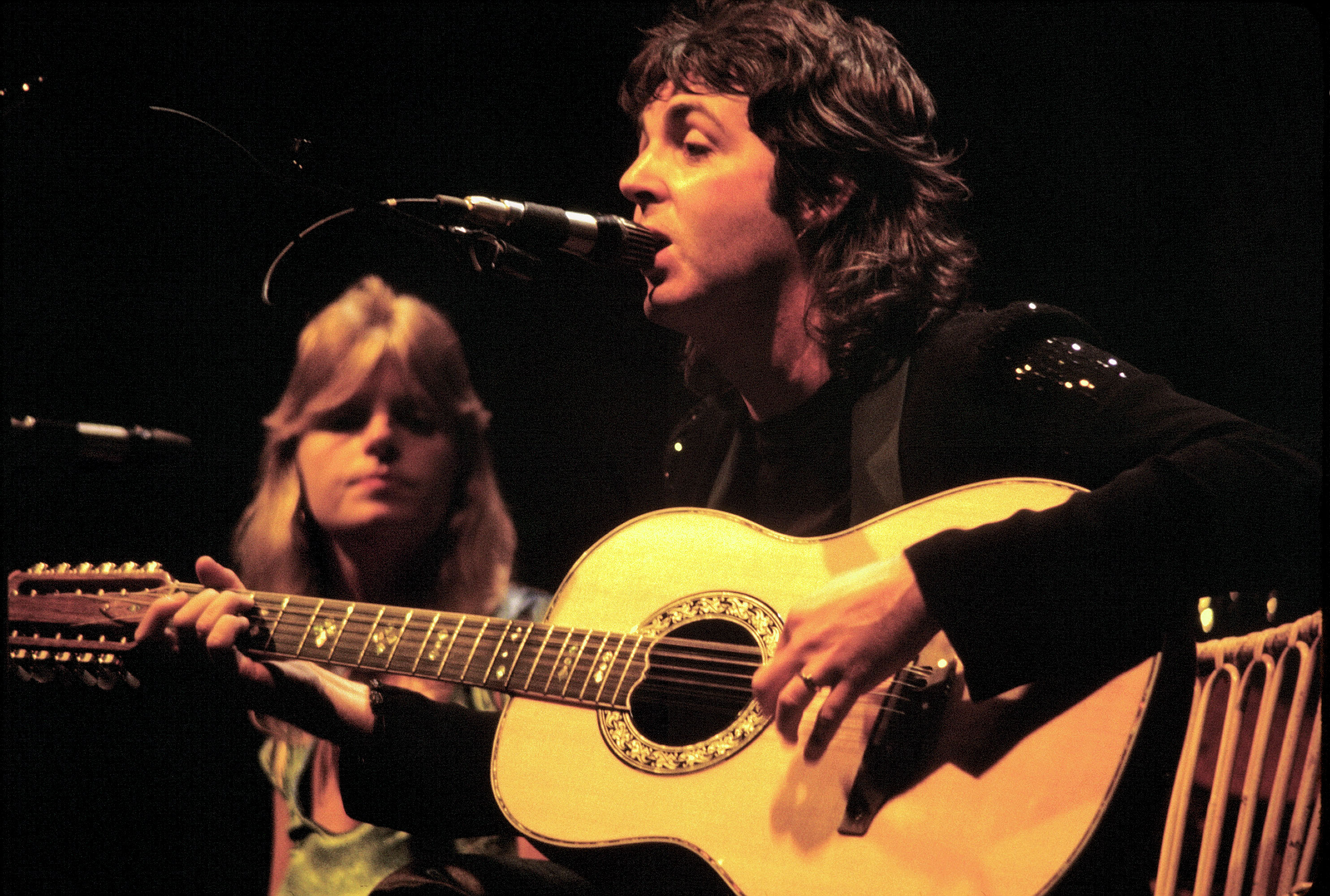
Wings had the best-selling single of 1977 with "Mull of Kintyre"/"Girls' School", which topped the chart for nine weeks. It was the first single to sell over two million copies in the UK alone and also became the year's Christmas number-one.

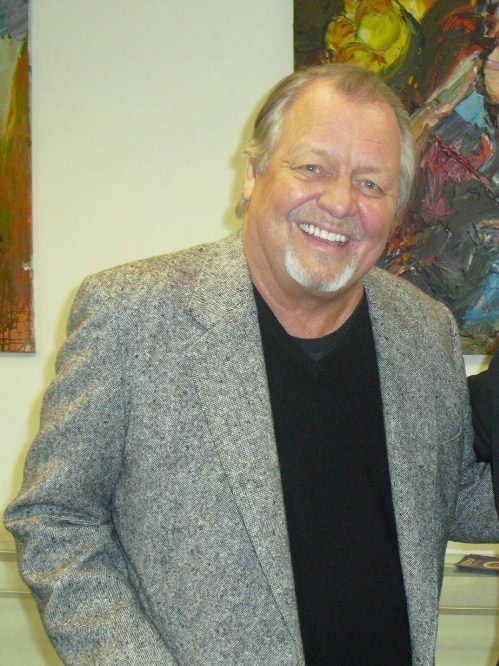
David Soul (pictured in 2013) achieved three top 10 singles this year, including the number-one hits "Don't Give Up on Us" and "Silver Lady", which both finished in the list of the year's top 10 best sellers.

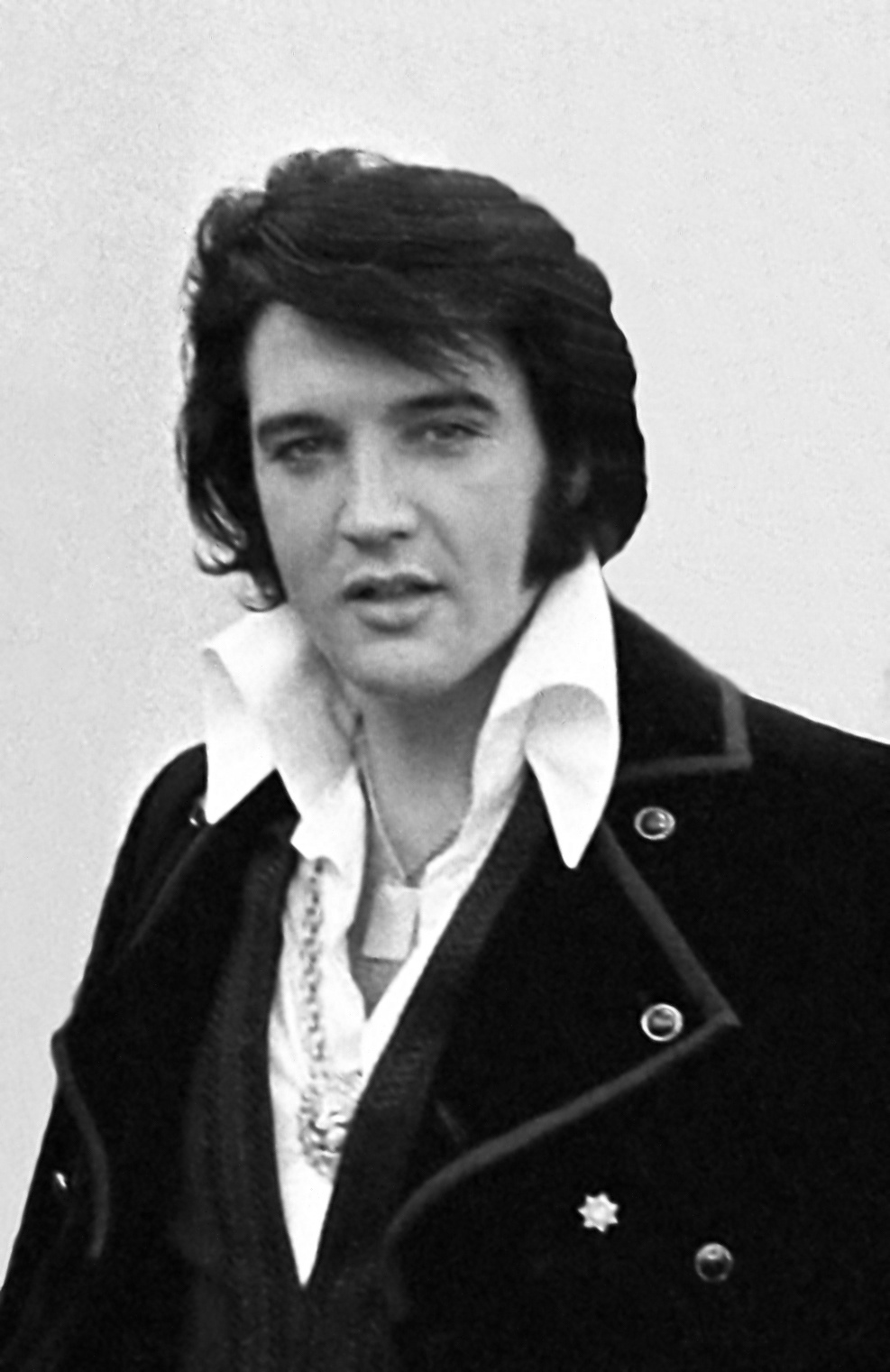
Elvis Presley secured three top 10 singles in 1977. Following his death on 16 August, "Way Down" rose to number-one and stayed there for five weeks, eventually becoming the eighth best selling single of the year. In October, a tribute song to Presley, "I Remember Elvis Presley (The King Is Dead)" by Dutch singer Danny Mirror, charted at number four.

The UK Singles Chart is one of many music charts compiled by the Official Charts Company that calculates the best-selling singles of the week in the United Kingdom. Before 2004, the chart was only based on the sales of physical singles. This list shows singles that peaked in the Top 10 of the UK Singles Chart during 1977, as well as songs which peaked in 1976 and 1978 but were in the top 10 in 1977. The entry date is when the song appeared in the top 10 for the first time (week ending, as published by the Official Charts Company, which is six days after the chart is announced).

One-hundred and seventeen songs were in the top ten in 1977. Eleven singles from 1976 remained in the top 10 for several weeks at the beginning of the year, while "It's a Heartache" by Bonnie Tyler and "Love's Unkind" by Donna Summer were both released in 1977 but did not reach their peak until 1978. "Portsmouth by Mike Oldfield, "Living Next Door to Alice" by Smokie and "Dr. Love" by Tina Charles were the songs from 1976 to reach their peak in 1977. Nineteen artists scored multiple entries in the top 10 in 1977. David Soul, Boney M., Deniece Williams, Sex Pistols and Darts were among the many artists who achieved their first UK charting top 10 single in 1977.

The 1976 Christmas number-one, "When a Child Is Born" by Johnny Mathis, remained at number-one for the first week of 1977. The first new number-one single of the year was "Don't Give Up on Us" by David Soul. Overall, eighteen different songs peaked at number-one in 1977, with ABBA and David Soul (2) having the joint most songs hit that position.

== Background ==
=== Multiple entries ===
One-hundred and seventeen singles charted in the top 10 in 1977, with one-hundred and seven singles reaching their peak this year.

Nineteen artists scored multiple entries in the top 10 in 1977. Boney M. and Showaddywaddy shared the record for most top 10 hits in 1977 with four hit singles each. Showaddywaddy's collection including the number-one single "Under the Moon of Love" from the end of the previous year, which remained in the top 10 for the first three weeks of 1977. Boney M. made their top 10 debut in January with the number six hit "Daddy Cool".

American-British actor and singer David Soul made the top 10 on three occasions in 1977, including the second-biggest selling single of the year "Don't Give Up on Us". Disco legend Donna Summer also had a very successful year, also scoring three top 10 entries, including the number-one hit "I Feel Love". Elvis Presley was another artist who had three top 10 entries this year, and following his death in August, he reached number-one for five weeks with his single "Way Down".

The Sex Pistols made their top 10 debut at number two in June with "God Save the Queen", and scored two further entries in 1977 with "Pretty Vacant" and "Holidays in the Sun", which peaked at numbers six and eight respectively.

Brotherhood of Man were one of a number of artists with two top-ten entries, including the number-one single "Angelo". 10cc, Deniece Williams, Leo Sayer, Queen and Rod Stewart were among the other artists who had multiple top 10 entries in 1977.

=== Chart debuts ===
Fifty-four artists achieved their first top 10 single in 1977, either as a lead or featured artist. Of these, three went on to record another hit single that year: Deniece Williams, Elkie Brooks and Julie Covington. David Soul, Sex Pistols and The Stranglers all recorded two more top 10 singles in 1977. Boney M. had three other entries in their breakthrough year.

The following table (collapsed on desktop site) does not include acts who had previously charted as part of a group and secured their first top 10 solo single.

Artist	Number of top 10s	First entry	Chart position	Other entries
David Soul	3	"Don't Give Up on Us"	1	"Going In with My Eyes Open" (2), "Silver Lady" (1)
Paul Nicholas	1	"Grandma's Party"	9	—
Barry Biggs	1	"Sideshow"	3	—
Julie Covington	2	"Don't Cry for Me Argentina"	1	"O.K.?" (10)
David Parton	1	"Isn't She Lovely"	4	—
Boney M.	4	"Daddy Cool"	6	"Sunny" (3), "Ma Baker" (2), "Belfast" (8)
Rose Royce	1	"Car Wash"	9	—
Heatwave	1	"Boogie Nights"	2	—
The Manhattan Transfer	1	"Chanson D'Amour"	1	—
The Brothers	1	"Sing Me"	8	—
Mr Big	1	"Romeo"	4	—
Boz Scaggs	1	"What Can I Say"	10	—
Mary MacGregor	1	"Torn Between Two Lovers"	4	—
Berni Flint	1	"I Don't Want to Put a Hold on You"	3	—
Marilyn McCoo	1	"You Don't Have to Be a Star (To Be in My Show)"	7	—
Billy Davis Jr.	1	"You Don't Have to Be a Star (To Be in My Show)"	7	—
Deniece Williams	2	"Free"	1	"That's What Friends Are For" (8)
The Dead End Kids	1	"Have I the Right?"	6	—
Elkie Brooks	2	"Pearl's a Singer"	8	"Sunshine After the Rain" (10)
Joe Tex	1	"Ain't Gonna Bump No More (With No Big Fat Woman)"	2	—
Van McCoy	1	"The Shuffle"	4	—
Eagles	1	"Hotel California"	8	—
Barbra Streisand	1	"Evergreen (Love Theme from A Star Is Born )	3	—
Piero Umiliani	1	"Mah Nà Mah Nà"	8	—
The Muppets	1	"Halfway Down the Stairs"	7	—
Charlotte Cornwell	1	"O.K.?"	10	—
Rula Lenska	1	"O.K.?"	10	—
Sue Jones-Davies	1	"O.K.?"	10	—
Sex Pistols	3	"God Save the Queen"	2	"Pretty Vacant" (6), "Holidays in the Sun" (8)
Carole Bayer Sager	1	"You're Moving Out Today"	6	—
Emerson, Lake & Palmer	1	"Fanfare for the Common Man"	2	—
The Stranglers	3	"Peaches"	8	"Something Better Change" (9), "No More Heroes" (8)
Alessi	1	"Oh Lori"	8	—
Rita Coolidge	1	"We're All Alone"	6	—
The Floaters	1	"Float On"	1	—
The Rah Band	1	"The Crunch"	6	—
Space	1	"Magic Fly"	2	—
Jean-Michel Jarre	1	"Oxygène Part IV"	4	—
Meri Wilson	1	"Telephone Man"	6	—
The Emotions	1	"Best of My Love"	4	—
The Rods	1	"Do Anything You Wanna Do"	9	—
La Belle Epoque	1	"Black Is Black"	2	—
Patsy Gallant	1	"From New York to L.A."	2	—
Yes	1	"Wonderous Stories"	7	—
Danny Mirror	1	"I Remember Elvis Presley (The King Is Dead)"	4	—
Baccara	1	"Yes Sir, I Can Boogie"	1	—
Meco	1	"Star Wars Theme/Cantina Band"	7	—
Ram Jam	1	"Black Betty"	7	—
Tom Robinson Band	1	"2-4-6-8 Motorway"	5	—
Darts	1	"Daddy Cool/The Girl Can't Help It"	6	—
Ruby Winters	1	"I Will"	4	—
Brighouse and Rastrick Brass Band	1	"The Floral Dance"	2	—
Jonathan Richman and The Modern Lovers	1	"Egyptian Reggae"	5	—
The Dooleys	1	"Love of My Life"	9	—

Notes

Kenny Rogers had his first hit single independent of his group The First Edition, with "Lucille" topping the chart. The Jacksons previously charted as The Jackson 5, their name having been changed in 1976 as Jermaine Jackson was replaced by Randy Jackson in the group. One member of Emerson, Lake and Palmer - Greg Lake - had reached number 2 as a solo artist in 1975 with the Christmas song "I Believe in Father Christmas". Jonathan Richman was lead singer of The Modern Lovers. The group were simply known as The Modern Lovers but changed their name in 1976.

=== Songs from films ===
Original songs from various films entered the top 10 throughout the year. These included "Car Wash" (from Car Wash), "Evergreen (Love Theme from A Star Is Born)", (A Star Is Born), "Mah Nà Mah Nà" (Sweden: Heaven and Hell), "Nobody Does It Better" (The Spy Who Loved Me), "Down Deep Inside" (The Deep), "How Deep Is Your Love" (Saturday Night Fever) and "White Christmas" (Holiday Inn and White Christmas).

=== Best-selling singles ===
Wings had the best-selling single of the year with "Mull of Kintyre"/"Girls' School". The song spent twelve weeks in the top 10 (including nine weeks at number one) and was certified platinum by the BPI. "Don't Give Up on Us" by David Soul came in second place. Julie Covington's "Don't Cry for Me Argentina", "When I Need You" from Leo Sayer and "Silver Lady" by David Soul made up the top five. Songs by ABBA, Donna Summer, Elvis Presley, Hot Chocolate and Brotherhood of Man were also in the top ten best-selling singles of the year.

== Top-ten singles ==
Key

Symbol	Meaning
‡	Single peaked in 1976 but still in chart in 1977.
♦	Single released in 1977 but peaked in 1978.
(#)	Year-end top-ten single position and rank
Entered	The date that the single first appeared in the chart.
Peak	Highest position that the single reached in the UK Singles Chart.

Entered (week ending)	Weeks in top 10	Single	Artist	Peak	Peak reached (week ending)	Weeks at peak
Singles in 1976
20 November 1976	9	"Under the Moon of Love" ‡	Showaddywaddy	1	4 December 1976	3
27 November 1976	7	"Somebody to Love" ‡	Queen	2	11 December 1976	1
27 November 1976	6	"Love Me" ‡	Yvonne Elliman	6	18 December 1976	1
27 November 1976	9	"Money, Money, Money" ‡	ABBA	3	11 December 1976	4
4 December 1976	5	"Livin' Thing" ‡	Electric Light Orchestra	4	18 December 1976	1
11 December 1976	6	"When a Child Is Born" ‡	Johnny Mathis	1	25 December 1976	3
18 December 1976	6	"Portsmouth"	Mike Oldfield	3	8 January 1977	1
18 December 1976	2	"Lean on Me" ‡ ^{[A]}	Mud	7	18 December 1976	1
25 December 1976	5	"Dr. Love"	Tina Charles	4	22 January 1977	1
25 December 1976	5	"Living Next Door to Alice"	Smokie	5	8 January 1977	1
25 December 1976	2	"Bionic Santa" ‡	Chris Hill	10	25 December 1976	2
Singles in 1977
8 January 1977	9	"Don't Give Up on Us" (#2)	David Soul	1	15 January 1977	4
8 January 1977	1	"Grandma's Party"	Paul Nicholas	9	8 January 1977	1
15 January 1977	7	"Sideshow"	Barry Biggs	3	22 January 1977	3
15 January 1977	4	"The Things We Do for Love"	10cc	6	15 January 1977	2
15 January 1977	9	"Don't Cry for Me Argentina" (#3)	Julie Covington	1	12 February 1977	1
22 January 1977	2	"I Wish"	Stevie Wonder	5	22 January 1977	1
22 January 1977	2	"The Wild Side of Life"	Status Quo	9	22 January 1977	2
29 January 1977	4	"Isn't She Lovely"	David Parton	4	29 January 1977	2
29 January 1977	2	"You're More Than A Number in My Little Red Book"	The Drifters	5	29 January 1977	1
29 January 1977	4	"Daddy Cool"	Boney M.	6	5 February 1977	1
29 January 1977	3	"Car Wash"	Rose Royce	9	12 February 1977	1
5 February 1977	7	"When I Need You" (#4)	Leo Sayer	1	19 February 1977	3
5 February 1977	3	"Suspicion"	Elvis Presley	9	5 February 1977	1
12 February 1977	5	"Don't Leave Me This Way"	Harold Melvin & the Blue Notes	5	26 February 1977	1
12 February 1977	4	"Jack in the Box"	The Moments	7	26 February 1977	1
19 February 1977	7	"Boogie Nights"	Heatwave	2	5 March 1977	1
26 February 1977	7	"Chanson D'Amour"	The Manhattan Transfer	1	12 March 1977	3
26 February 1977	2	"Sing Me"	The Brothers	8	26 February 1977	2
26 February 1977	2	"This Is Tomorrow" ^{[B]}	Bryan Ferry	9	12 March 1977	1
5 March 1977	4	"Romeo"	Mr Big	4	5 March 1977	2
5 March 1977	1	"What Can I Say"	Boz Scaggs	10	5 March 1977	1
12 March 1977	4	"Torn Between Two Lovers"	Mary MacGregor	4	12 March 1977	1
12 March 1977	6	"Sound and Vision"	David Bowie	3	26 March 1977	1
12 March 1977	9	"Knowing Me, Knowing You" (#6)	ABBA	1	2 April 1977	5
19 March 1977	6	"When"	Showaddywaddy	3	9 April 1977	1
19 March 1977	2	"Rockaria!"	Electric Light Orchestra	9	19 March 1977	1
19 March 1977	1	"Baby I Know"	The Rubettes	10	19 March 1977	1
26 March 1977	6	"Going In with My Eyes Open"	David Soul	2	2 April 1977	3
26 March 1977	4	"Moody Blue"	Elvis Presley	6	2 April 1977	1
2 April 1977	5	"Sunny"	Boney M.	3	16 April 1977	1
2 April 1977	6	"I Don't Want to Put a Hold On You"	Berni Flint	3	23 April 1977	1
9 April 1977	5	"Red Light Spells Danger"	Billy Ocean	2	23 April 1977	2
9 April 1977	2	"Oh Boy (The Mood I'm In)"	Brotherhood of Man	8	16 April 1977	1
16 April 1977	3	"You Don't Have to Be a Star (To Be in My Show)"	Marilyn McCoo & Billy Davis Jr.	7	30 April 1977	1
23 April 1977	6	"Free"	Deniece Williams	1	7 May 1977	2
23 April 1977	4	"Have I the Right?"	Dead End Kids	6	30 April 1977	2
23 April 1977	5	"Sir Duke"	Stevie Wonder	2	7 May 1977	1
30 April 1977	3	"Pearl's a Singer"	Elkie Brooks	8	7 May 1977	1
7 May 1977	8	"I Don't Want to Talk About It"/"The First Cut Is the Deepest"	Rod Stewart	1	21 May 1977	4
7 May 1977	3	"Whodunit"	Tavares	5	7 May 1977	2
7 May 1977	1	"How Much Love"	Leo Sayer	10	7 May 1977	1
14 May 1977	6	"Ain't Gonna Bump No More (With No Big Fat Woman)"	Joe Tex	2	28 May 1977	1
14 May 1977	6	"The Shuffle"	Van McCoy	4	21 May 1977	1
14 May 1977	3	"Hotel California"	Eagles	8	14 May 1977	1
14 May 1977	5	"Good Morning Judge"	10cc	5	28 May 1977	1
21 May 1977	8	"Lucille"	Kenny Rogers	1	18 June 1977	1
21 May 1977	8	"Evergreen (Love Theme from A Star Is Born)"	Barbra Streisand	3	28 May 1977	1
28 May 1977	2	"Mah Nà Mah Nà"	Piero Umiliani	8	28 May 1977	1
28 May 1977	2	"Got to Give It Up"	Marvin Gaye	7	4 June 1977	1
4 June 1977	3	"Halfway Down the Stairs"	The Muppets	7	18 June 1977	1
4 June 1977	1	"O.K.?"	Julie Covington, Charlotte Cornwell, Rula Lenska & Sue Jones-Davies	10	4 June 1977	1
11 June 1977	3	"God Save the Queen"	Sex Pistols	2	11 June 1977	1
11 June 1977	6	"Show You the Way to Go"	The Jacksons	1	25 June 1977	1
11 June 1977	4	"You're Moving Out Today"	Carole Bayer Sager	6	18 June 1977	3
18 June 1977	3	"Telephone Line"	Electric Light Orchestra	8	18 June 1977	2
25 June 1977	6	"So You Win Again" (#9)	Hot Chocolate	1	2 July 1977	3
25 June 1977	6	"Baby, Don't Change Your Mind"	Gladys Knight & The Pips	4	9 July 1977	1
25 June 1977	8	"Fanfare for the Common Man"	Emerson, Lake & Palmer	2	16 July 1977	1
2 July 1977	4	"Sam"	Olivia Newton-John	6	9 July 1977	1
2 July 1977	3	"Peaches"	The Stranglers	8	9 July 1977	1
9 July 1977	7	"Ma Baker"	Boney M.	2	30 July 1977	1
16 July 1977	7	"I Feel Love" (#7)	Donna Summer	1	23 July 1977	4
16 July 1977	4	"Pretty Vacant"	Sex Pistols	6	30 July 1977	1
16 July 1977	10	"Angelo" (#10)	Brotherhood of Man	1	20 August 1977	1
23 July 1977	3	"Oh Lori"	Alessi	8	30 July 1977	1
23 July 1977	1	"Slow Down"	John Miles	10	23 July 1977	1
30 July 1977	5	"We're All Alone"	Rita Coolidge	6	6 August 1977	1
30 July 1977	2	"Easy" ^{[C]}	Commodores	9	13 August 1977	1
6 August 1977	3	"It's Your Life"	Smokie	5	20 August 1977	1
6 August 1977	5	"You Got What It Takes"	Showaddywaddy	2	20 August 1977	1
13 August 1977	6	"Float On"	The Floaters	1	27 August 1977	1
13 August 1977	4	"The Crunch"	The Rah Band	6	20 August 1977	2
20 August 1977	1	"Something Better Change"	The Stranglers	9	20 August 1977	1
20 August 1977	5	"That's What Friends Are For" ^{[D]}	Deniece Williams	8	27 August 1977	2
27 August 1977	9	"Way Down" (#8)	Elvis Presley	1	3 September 1977	5
27 August 1977	4	"Nights on Broadway"	Candi Staton	6	3 September 1977	1
27 August 1977	5	"Nobody Does It Better"	Carly Simon	7	17 September 1977	2
3 September 1977	6	"Magic Fly"	Space	2	10 September 1977	3
3 September 1977	10	"Silver Lady" (#5)	David Soul	1	8 October 1977	3
10 September 1977	4	"Oxygène Part IV"	Jean-Michel Jarre	4	10 September 1977	4
10 September 1977	5	"Down Deep Inside"	Donna Summer	5	10 September 1977	4
17 September 1977	5	"Telephone Man"	Meri Wilson	6	24 September 1977	2
24 September 1977	5	"Best of My Love"	The Emotions	4	8 October 1977	1
24 September 1977	1	"Do Anything You Wanna Do"	The Rods	9	24 September 1977	1
1 October 1977	7	"Black Is Black"	La Belle Epoque	2	15 October 1977	3
1 October 1977	3	"From New York to L.A."	Patsy Gallant	6	8 October 1977	1
1 October 1977	1	"Sunshine After the Rain"	Elkie Brooks	10	1 October 1977	1
8 October 1977	1	"Wonderous Stories"	Yes	7	8 October 1977	1
8 October 1977	4	"I Remember Elvis Presley (The King Is Dead)"	Danny Mirror	4	15 October 1977	1
15 October 1977	7	"Yes Sir, I Can Boogie"	Baccara	1	29 October 1977	1
15 October 1977	6	"You're in My Heart (The Final Acclaim)"	Rod Stewart	3	29 October 1977	3
15 October 1977	2	"No More Heroes"	The Stranglers	8	22 October 1977	1
22 October 1977	2	"Star Wars Theme/Cantina Band"	Meco	7	22 October 1977	1
22 October 1977	3	"Black Betty" ^{[E]}	Ram Jam	7	29 October 1977	1
29 October 1977	6	"The Name of the Game"	ABBA	1	5 November 1977	4
29 October 1977	7	"Rockin' All Over the World"	Status Quo	3	19 November 1977	3
29 October 1977	2	"Holidays in the Sun"	Sex Pistols	8	29 October 1977	1
5 November 1977	7	"We Are the Champions"	Queen	2	19 November 1977	3
5 November 1977	4	"2-4-6-8 Motorway"	Tom Robinson Band	5	12 November 1977	2
5 November 1977	3	"Calling Occupants of Interplanetary Craft"	The Carpenters	9	12 November 1977	1
12 November 1977	1	"Needles and Pins"	Smokie	10	12 November 1977	1
19 November 1977	3	"Live in Trouble"	The Barron Knights	7	19 November 1977	1
19 November 1977	5	"Dancin' Party"	Showaddywaddy	4	26 November 1977	2
19 November 1977	10	"How Deep Is Your Love"	Bee Gees	3	10 December 1977	5
26 November 1977	12	"Mull of Kintyre"/"Girls' School" (#1)	Wings	1	3 December 1977	9
26 November 1977	7	"Daddy Cool/The Girl Can't Help It"	Darts	6	10 December 1977	2
3 December 1977	7	"I Will"	Ruby Winters	4	17 December 1977	3
3 December 1977	8	"The Floral Dance"	Brighouse and Rastrick Brass Band	2	10 December 1977	6
10 December 1977	4	"Egyptian Reggae"	Jonathan Richman & The Modern Lovers	5	17 December 1977	1
10 December 1977	2	"Belfast"	Boney M.	8	17 December 1977	1
17 December 1977	1	"Love of My Life"	The Dooleys	9	17 December 1977	1
24 December 1977	2	"White Christmas"	Bing Crosby	5	24 December 1977	2
24 December 1977	8	"Love's Unkind" ♦	Donna Summer	3	14 January 1978	3
24 December 1977	7	"It's a Heartache" ♦	Bonnie Tyler	4	14 January 1978	2
24 December 1977	2	"Put Your Love In Me"	Hot Chocolate	10	24 December 1977	2

== Entries by artist ==
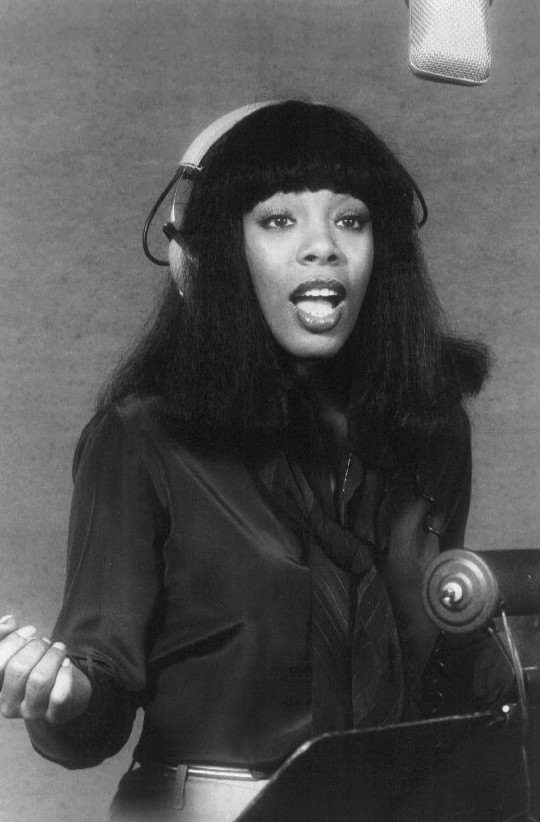
Donna Summer secured three top 10 hits this year, including her only UK number-one single, "I Feel Love".

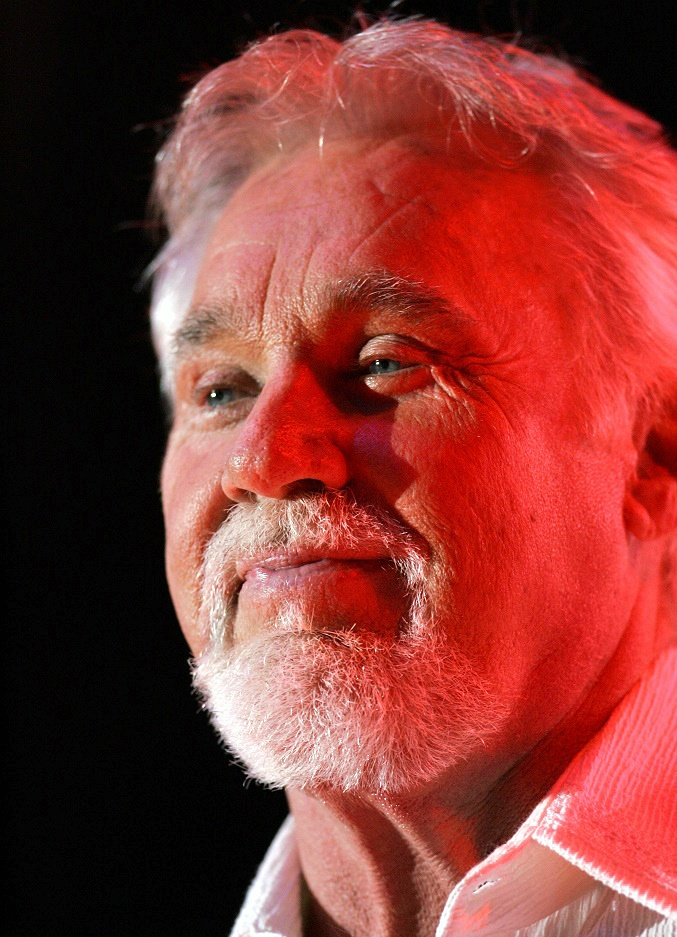
Kenny Rogers (pictured in 2006) achieved his first UK top 10 hit as a solo artist in 1977 with "Lucille", which spent one week at number-one in June.

The following table shows artists who achieved two or more top 10 entries in 1977, including singles that reached their peak in 1976 or 1978. The figures include both main artists and featured artists, while appearances on ensemble charity records are also counted for each artist. The total number of weeks an artist spent in the top ten in 1976 is also shown.

Entries	Artist	Weeks	Singles
4	Boney M.	18	"Belfast", "Daddy Cool", "Ma Baker", "Sunny"
4	Showaddywaddy ^{[F]}	19	"Dancin' Party", "Under the Moon of Love", "When", "You Got What It Takes"
3	ABBA ^{[F]}	19	"Knowing Me, Knowing You", "Money, Money, Money", "The Name of the Game"
3	David Soul	25	"Don't Give Up on Us", "Going In with My Eyes Open", "Silver Lady"
3	Donna Summer ^{[G]}	8	"Down Deep Inside (Theme from The Deep)", "I Feel Love", "Love's Unkind"
3	Electric Light Orchestra ^{[F]}	6	"Livin' Thing", "Rockaria!", "Telephone Line"
3	Elvis Presley	16	"Moody Blue", "Suspicion", "Way Down"
3	Sex Pistols	9	"God Save the Queen", "Holidays in the Sun", "Pretty Vacant"
3	Smokie ^{[H]}	8	"It's Your Life", "Living Next Door to Alice", "Needles and Pins"
3	The Stranglers	6	"No More Heroes", "Peaches", "Something Better Change"
2	10cc	8	"Good Morning Judge", "The Things We Do for Love"
2	Brotherhood of Man	12	"Angelo", "Oh Boy (The Mood I'm In)"
2	Deniece Williams	11	"Free", "That's What Friends Are For"
2	Elkie Brooks	4	"Pearl's a Singer", "Sunshine After the Rain"
2	Julie Covington	10	"Don't Cry for Me Argentina", "O.K.?"
2	Leo Sayer	8	"How Much Love", "When I Need You"
2	Queen ^{[F]}	9	"Somebody to Love", "We Are the Champions"
2	Rod Stewart	14	"I Don't Want to Talk About It"/"The First Cut Is the Deepest", "You're in My Heart (The Final Acclaim)"
2	Stevie Wonder	7	"I Wish", "Sir Duke"

== Notes ==
- ^{a} "Lean on Me" re-entered the top 10 at number 10 on 8 January 1977 (week ending).
- ^{b} "This Is Tomorrow" re-entered the top 10 at number 9 on 12 March 1977 (week ending).
- ^{c} "Easy" re-entered the top 10 at number 9 on 13 August 1977 (week ending).
- ^{d} "That's What Friends Are For" re-entered the top 10 at number 10 on 24 September 1977 (week ending).
- ^{e} "Black Betty" re-entered the top 10 at number 8 on 12 November 1977 (week ending).
- ^{f} Figure includes single that peaked in 1976.
- ^{g} Figure includes single that peaked in 1978.
- ^{h} Figure includes single that first charted in 1976 but peaked in 1977.

== See also ==
- 1977 in British music
- List of number-one singles from the 1970s (UK)
