= List of UK top-ten singles in 1978 =

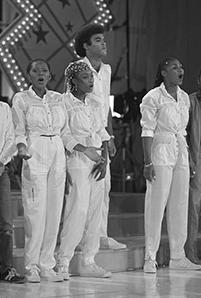
Boney M. had the best selling single of 1978 with "Rivers of Babylon/Brown Girl in the Ring", which spent five weeks at number-one in May and June. They achieved a second chart topper in December with "Mary's Boy Child - Oh My Lord", which also became the year's Christmas number-one, while "Rasputin" peaked at number two in October.

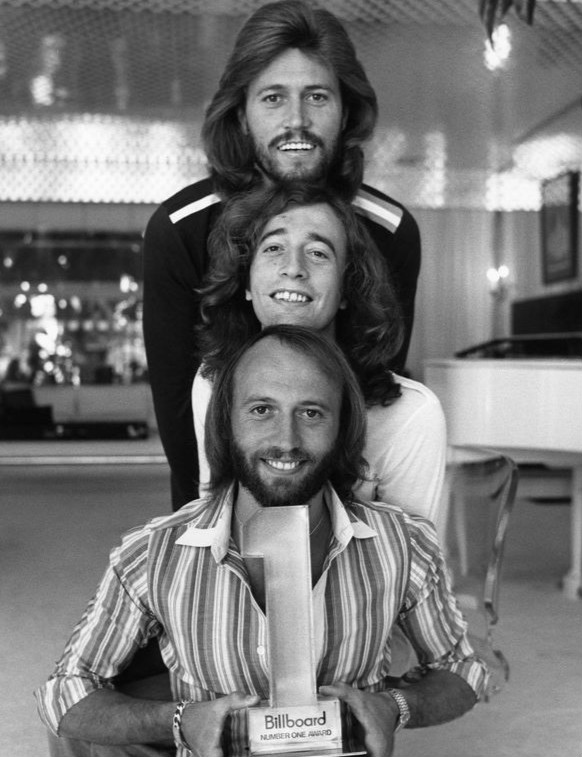
The Bee Gees achieved four top 10 singles this year, three of which were featured on the soundtrack of the film Saturday Night Fever. The most successful of these was "Night Fever", which reached number-one in April.

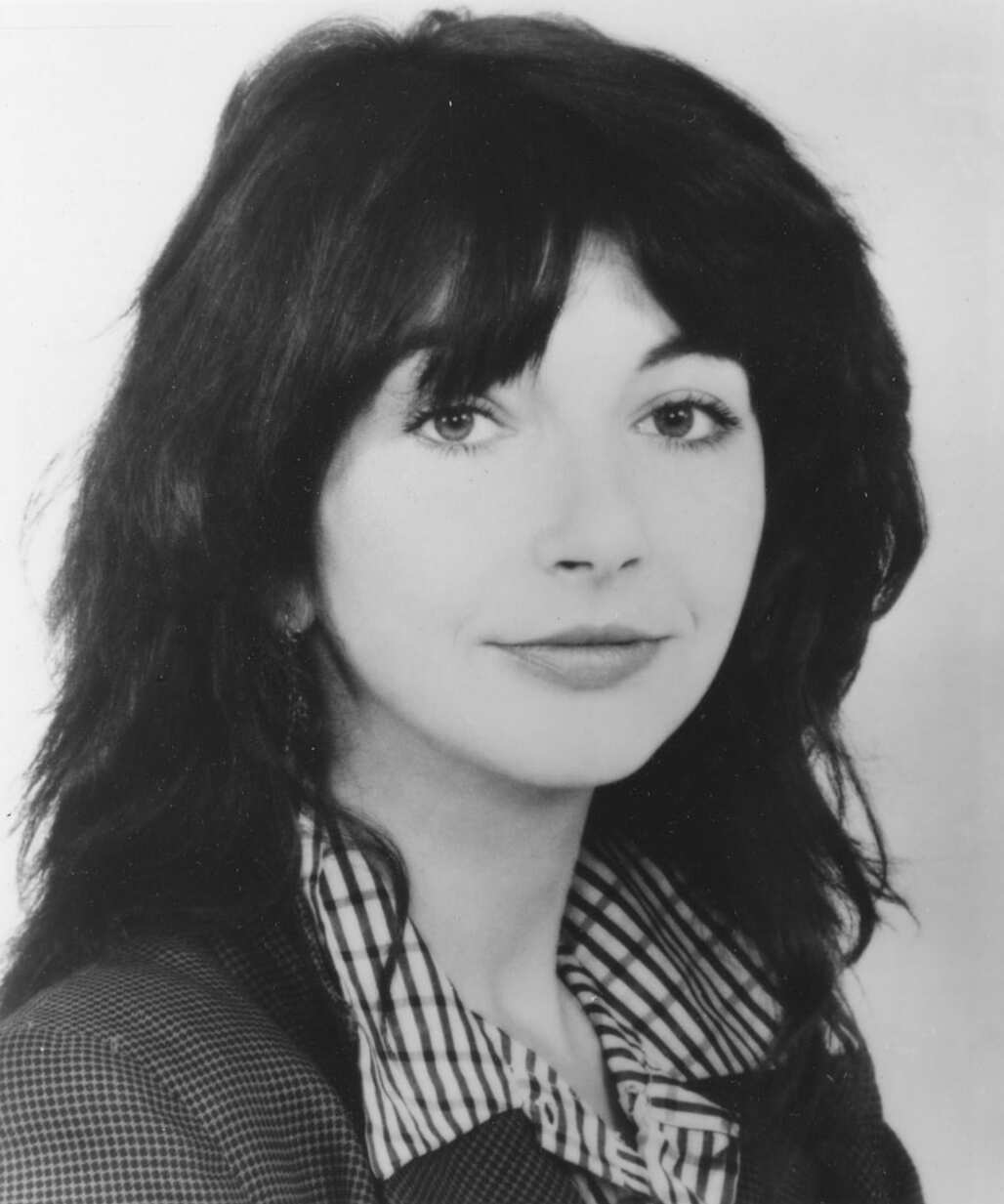
Kate Bush made her UK top 10 debut in 1978 with her first single release, "Wuthering Heights", which spent four weeks at number-one. Bush also became the first female artist to have an entirely self-penned number-one hit in the UK.

The UK Singles Chart is one of many music charts compiled by the Official Charts Company that calculates the best-selling singles of the week in the United Kingdom. Before 2004, the chart was only based on the sales of physical singles. This list shows singles that peaked in the Top 10 of the UK Singles Chart during 1978, as well as singles which peaked in 1977 and 1979 but were in the top 10 in 1978. The entry date is when the single appeared in the top 10 for the first time (week ending, as published by the Official Charts Company, which is six days after the chart is announced).

One-hundred and twenty-one singles were in the top ten in 1978. Seven singles from 1977 remained in the top 10 for several weeks at the beginning of the year, while "Song for Guy" by Elton John, "Lay Your Love on Me" by Racey and "Y.M.C.A." by The Village People were all released in 1978 but did not reach their peak until 1979. "It's a Heartache by Bonnie Tyler and "Love's Unkind" by Donna Summer were the singles from 1977 to reach their peak in 1978. Eighteen artists scored multiple entries in the top 10 in 1978. Blondie, Commodores, Kate Bush, Sarah Brightman and The Village People were among the many artists who achieved their first UK charting top 10 single in 1978.

The 1977 Christmas number-one, "Mull of Kintyre" by Wings, remained at number-one for the first four weeks of 1978. The first new number-one single of the year was "Uptown Top Ranking" by Althea & Donna. Overall, fourteen different singles peaked at number-one in 1978, with Boney M., John Travolta and Olivia Newton-John (2) having the joint most singles hit that position.

== Background ==
=== Multiple entries ===
One-hundred and twenty-one singles charted in the top 10 in 1978, with one-hundred and thirteen singles reaching their peak this year.

Eighteen artists scored multiple entries in the top 10 in 1978. Bee Gees and Darts shared the record for most top 10 hits in 1978 with four hit singles each.

Kate Bush was one of a number of artists with two top-ten entries, including the number-one single "Wuthering Heights". ABBA, Bob Marley and the Wailers, The Boomtown Rats, Rose Royce, Sham 69 and Wings were the other artists who had multiple top 10 entries in 1978.

=== Chart debuts ===
Fifty-eight artists achieved their first top 10 single in 1978, either as a lead or featured artist. Of these, four went on to record another hit single that year: Bob Marley and the Wailers, The Boomtown Rats, Kate Bush and Sham 69. Blondie, Chic and John Travolta all had two other entries in their breakthrough year.

The following table (collapsed on desktop site) does not include acts who had previously charted as part of a group and secured their first top 10 solo single.

| Artist | Number of top 10s | First entry | Chart position | Other entries |
|---|---|---|---|---|
| Crystal Gayle | 1 | "Don't It Make My Brown Eyes Blue" | 5 | — |
| Chic | 3 | "Dance, Dance, Dance (Yowsah, Yowsah, Yowsah)" | 6 | "Everybody Dance" (9), "Le Freak" (7) |
| Althea & Donna | 1 | "Uptown Top Ranking" | 1 | — |
| Odyssey | 1 | "Native New Yorker" | 5 | — |
| Bill Withers | 1 | "Lovely Day" | 7 | — |
| Scott Fitzgerald | 1 | "If I Had Words" | 3 | — |
| Yvonne Keeley | 1 | "If I Had Words" | 3 | — |
| Bob Marley and the Wailers | 2 | "Jamming"/"Punky Reggae Party" | 9 | "Is This Love" (9) |
| Yellow Dog | 1 | "Just One More Night" | 8 | — |
| Kate Bush | 2 | "Wuthering Heights" | 1 | "The Man with the Child in His Eyes" (6) |
| Blondie | 3 | "Denis" | 2 | "(I'm Always Touched by Your) Presence, Dear" (10), "Hanging on the Telephone" (5) |
| Eruption | 1 | "I Can't Stand the Rain" | 5 | — |
| Brian and Michael | 1 | "Matchstalk Men and Matchstalk Cats and Dogs" | 1 | — |
| Nick Lowe | 1 | "I Love the Sound of Breaking Glass" | 7 | — |
| Andy Cameron | 1 | "Ally's Tartan Army" | 6 | — |
| Genesis | 1 | "Follow You Follow Me" | 7 | — |
| Andrew Gold | 1 | "Never Let Her Slip Away" | 5 | — |
| The Michael Zager Band | 1 | "Let's All Chant" | 8 | — |
| Dee D. Jackson | 1 | "Automatic Lover" | 4 | — |
| Patti Smith Group | 1 | "Because the Night" | 5 | — |
| John Paul Young | 1 | "Love Is in the Air" | 5 | — |
| Raffaella Carrà | 1 | "Do It, Do It Again" | 9 | — |
| John Travolta | 3 | "You're the One That I Want" | 1 | "Summer Nights" (1), "Sandy" (2) |
| Ian Dury | 1 | "What a Waste" | 3 | — |
| The Blockheads | 1 | "What a Waste" | 3 | — |
| Plastic Bertrand | 1 | "Ça plane pour moi" | 8 | — |
| The Scottish World Cup Squad | 1 | Ole Ola (Mulher Brasileira)" | 4 | — |
| James Galway | 1 | "Annie's Song" | 3 | — |
| Father Abraham | 1 | "The Smurf Song" | 2 | — |
| The Smurfs | 1 | "The Smurf Song" | 2 | — |
| Goldie | 1 | "Making Up Again" | 7 | — |
| The Motors | 1 | "Airport" | 4 | — |
| Marshall Hain | 1 | "Dancing In the City" | 4 | — |
| The Boomtown Rats | 2 | "Like Clockwork" | 6 | "Rat Trap" (1) |
| Clout | 1 | "Substitute" | 2 | — |
| A Taste of Honey | 1 | "Boogie Oogie Oogie" | 3 | — |
| City Boy | 1 | "5.7.0.5" | 8 | — |
| Commodores | 1 | "Three Times a Lady" | 1 | — |
| Sham 69 | 2 | "If the Kids Are United" | 9 | "Hurry Up Harry" (10) |
| Renaissance | 1 | "Northern Lights" | 10 | — |
| Cerrone | 1 | "Supernature" | 8 | — |
| Jilted John | 1 | "Jilted John" | 4 | — |
| Child | 1 | "It's Only Make Believe" | 10 | — |
| Hi-Tension | 1 | "British Hustle" | 8 | — |
| Andy Gibb | 1 | "An Everlasting Love" | 10 | — |
| Siouxie and the Banshees | 1 | "Hong Kong Garden" | 7 | — |
| Exile | 1 | "Kiss You All Over" | 6 | — |
| Dean Friedman | 1 | "Lucky Stars" | 3 | — |
| Sylvester | 1 | "You Make Me Feel (Mighty Real)" | 3 | — |
| Third World | 1 | "Now That We've Found Love" | 10 | — |
| Public Image Ltd | 1 | "Public Image" | 9 | — |
| Frankie Miller | 1 | "Darlin'" | 6 | — |
| The Cars | 1 | "My Best Friend's Girl" | 3 | — |
| Dan Hartman | 1 | "Instant Replay" | 8 | — |
| Sarah Brightman | 1 | "I Lost My Heart to a Starship Trooper" | 6 | — |
| Hot Gossip | 1 | "I Lost My Heart to a Starship Trooper" | 6 | — |
| The Village People | 1 | "Y.M.C.A." ^{[A]} | 1 | — |
| Racey | 1 | "Lay Your Love on Me" ^{[B]} | 3 | — |

Notes

Gerry Rafferty was previously part of Stealers Wheel, who charted with the classic single "Stuck in the Middle with You" in 1973. "Baker Street" was his first top 10 solo entry. Justin Hayward started off as lead singer, songwriter and guitarist for The Moody Blues, among his writing credits the number two hit "Question". The composition "Forever Autumn" marked his first appearance in the chart on his own.

Public Image Ltd included members from several other bands - Johnny Rotten had recently left Sex Pistols and Keith Levene came over from The Clash (although Levene never recorded a top 10 single as part of his old group).

=== Charity singles ===
"Too Much Heaven" was released by Bee Gees in aid of UNICEF, with all publishing royalties going towards the charity to support its work. The single peaked at number three on 9 December 1978, spending 6 weeks in the top ten. The group later performed the song at the Music for UNICEF Concert in January 1979, celebrating the International Year of the Child. A total of $7 million in publishing royalties was raised towards the charity from sales of the single.

=== Songs from films ===
Original songs from various films entered the top 10 throughout the year. These included "Stayin' Alive" "Night Fever", "If I Can't Have You" & "More Than a Woman" (from Saturday Night Fever) and "You're the One That I Want", "Grease", "Summer Nights", "Sandy" & "Hopelessly Devoted to You" (Grease).

=== Best-selling singles ===
Boney M. had the best-selling single of the year with "Rivers of Babylon"/"Brown Girl in the Ring". The song spent nineteen weeks in the top 10 (including five weeks at number one) and was certified platinum by the BPI. "You're the One That I Want" by John Travolta & Olivia Newton-John came in second place. John Travolta & Olivia Newton-John's "Summer Nights", "Three Times a Lady" from Commodores and "The Smurf Song" by Father Abraham & The Smurfs made up the top five. Singles by Boney M. ("Mary's Boy Child – Oh My Lord"), Bee Gees, The Boomtown Rats, ABBA and Brian and Michael were also in the top ten best-selling singles of the year.

== Top-ten singles ==
Key

| Symbol | Meaning |
|---|---|
| ‡ | Single peaked in 1977 but still in chart in 1978. |
| ♦ | Single released in 1978 but peaked in 1979. |
| (#) | Year-end top-ten single position and rank |
| Entered | The date that the single first appeared in the chart. |
| Peak | Highest position that the single reached in the UK Singles Chart. |

| Entered (week ending) | Weeks in top 10 | Single | Artist | Peak | Peak reached (week ending) | Weeks at peak |
Singles in 1977
| 19 November 1977 | 10 | "How Deep Is Your Love" ‡ | Bee Gees | 3 | 10 December 1977 | 5 |
| 26 November 1977 | 7 | "Daddy Cool/The Girl Can't Help It" ‡ | Darts | 6 | 10 December 1977 | 2 |
| 26 November 1977 | 12 | "Mull of Kintyre"/"Girls' School" ‡ | Wings | 1 | 3 December 1977 | 9 |
| 3 December 1977 | 7 | "I Will" ‡ | Ruby Winters | 4 | 17 December 1977 | 3 |
| 3 December 1977 | 8 | "The Floral Dance" ‡ | Brighouse and Rastrick Brass Band | 2 | 10 December 1977 | 6 |
| 24 December 1977 | 8 | "Love's Unkind" | Donna Summer | 3 | 14 January 1978 | 3 |
| 24 December 1977 | 7 | "It's a Heartache" | Bonnie Tyler | 4 | 14 January 1978 | 2 |
Singles in 1978
| 7 January 1978 | 4 | "Don't It Make My Brown Eyes Blue" | Crystal Gayle | 5 | 14 January 1978 | 1 |
| 7 January 1978 | 1 | "My Way" | Elvis Presley | 9 | 7 January 1978 | 1 |
| 7 January 1978 | 4 | "Dance, Dance, Dance (Yowsah, Yowsah, Yowsah)" | Chic | 6 | 14 January 1978 | 1 |
| 14 January 1978 | 2 | "Let's Have A Quiet Night In" | David Soul | 8 | 14 January 1978 | 1 |
| 14 January 1978 | 1 | "I Love You" | Donna Summer | 10 | 14 January 1978 | 1 |
| 21 January 1978 | 5 | "Uptown Top Ranking" | Althea & Donna | 1 | 4 February 1978 | 1 |
| 21 January 1978 | 4 | "Native New Yorker" | Odyssey | 5 | 28 January 1978 | 2 |
| 28 January 1978 | 6 | "Figaro" | Brotherhood of Man | 1 | 11 February 1978 | 1 |
| 28 January 1978 | 3 | "Lovely Day" | Bill Withers | 7 | 4 February 1978 | 2 |
| 28 January 1978 | 6 | "If I Had Words" | Scott Fitzgerald & Yvonne Keeley | 3 | 18 February 1978 | 1 |
| 4 February 1978 | 2 | "Jamming"/"Punky Reggae Party" | Bob Marley and the Wailers | 9 | 4 February 1978 | 1 |
| 4 February 1978 | 8 | "Take a Chance on Me" (#9) | ABBA | 1 | 18 February 1978 | 3 |
| 11 February 1978 | 3 | "Sorry, I'm a Lady" | Baccara | 8 | 11 February 1978 | 2 |
| 18 February 1978 | 6 | "Come Back My Love" | Darts | 2 | 4 March 1978 | 1 |
| 18 February 1978 | 2 | "Hot Legs"/"I Was Only Joking" | Rod Stewart | 5 | 18 February 1978 | 1 |
| 18 February 1978 | 6 | "Wishing on a Star" | Rose Royce | 3 | 4 March 1978 | 1 |
| 18 February 1978 | 5 | "Mr. Blue Sky" | Electric Light Orchestra | 6 | 25 February 1978 | 1 |
| 18 February 1978 | 3 | "Love Is Like Oxygen" | Sweet | 9 | 18 February 1978 | 2 |
| 25 February 1978 | 3 | "Just One More Night" | Yellow Dog | 8 | 4 March 1978 | 1 |
| 4 March 1978 | 4 | "Stayin' Alive" | Bee Gees | 4 | 4 March 1978 | 1 |
| 4 March 1978 | 7 | "Wuthering Heights" | Kate Bush | 1 | 11 March 1978 | 4 |
| 11 March 1978 | 6 | "Denis" | Blondie | 2 | 25 March 1978 | 3 |
| 11 March 1978 | 5 | "I Can't Stand The Rain" | Eruption | 5 | 25 March 1978 | 2 |
| 11 March 1978 | 8 | "Baker Street" | Gerry Rafferty | 3 | 1 April 1978 | 2 |
| 18 March 1978 | 9 | "Matchstalk Men and Matchstalk Cats and Dogs" (#10) | Brian and Michael | 1 | 8 April 1978 | 3 |
| 25 March 1978 | 3 | "I Love the Sound of Breaking Glass" | Nick Lowe | 7 | 1 April 1978 | 1 |
| 1 April 1978 | 2 | "Ally's Tartan Army" ^{[C]} | Andy Cameron | 6 | 1 April 1978 | 1 |
| 1 April 1978 | 1 | "Is This Love" | Bob Marley and the Wailers | 9 | 1 April 1978 | 1 |
| 1 April 1978 | 6 | "If You Can't Give Me Love" | Suzi Quatro | 4 | 15 April 1978 | 3 |
| 8 April 1978 | 5 | "I Wonder Why" | Showaddywaddy | 2 | 15 April 1978 | 1 |
| 8 April 1978 | 4 | "Follow You Follow Me" | Genesis | 7 | 15 April 1978 | 2 |
| 15 April 1978 | 6 | "Never Let Her Slip Away" | Andrew Gold | 5 | 6 May 1978 | 2 |
| 15 April 1978 | 4 | "With a Little Luck" | Wings | 5 | 22 April 1978 | 1 |
| 15 April 1978 | 7 | "Too Much, Too Little, Too Late" | Johnny Mathis & Deniece Williams | 3 | 13 May 1978 | 1 |
| 22 April 1978 | 8 | "Night Fever" (#7) | Bee Gees | 1 | 29 April 1978 | 2 |
| 29 April 1978 | 4 | "Let's All Chant" | The Michael Zager Band | 8 | 13 May 1978 | 1 |
| 6 May 1978 | 19 | "Rivers of Babylon"/"Brown Girl in the Ring" (#1) ^{[D]} | Boney M. | 1 | 13 May 1978 | 5 |
| 6 May 1978 | 3 | "Automatic Lover" | Dee D. Jackson | 4 | 13 May 1978 | 1 |
| 13 May 1978 | 5 | "Because the Night" | Patti Smith Group | 5 | 27 May 1978 | 1 |
| 13 May 1978 | 1 | "Everybody Dance" | Chic | 9 | 13 May 1978 | 1 |
| 13 May 1978 | 7 | "The Boy from New York City" | Darts | 2 | 3 June 1978 | 1 |
| 20 May 1978 | 4 | "Love Is in the Air" | John Paul Young | 5 | 3 June 1978 | 1 |
| 20 May 1978 | 5 | "If I Can't Have You" | Yvonne Elliman | 4 | 27 May 1978 | 2 |
| 27 May 1978 | 3 | "More Than a Woman" | Tavares | 7 | 27 May 1978 | 2 |
| 27 May 1978 | 1 | "Do It, Do It Again" | Raffaella Carrà | 9 | 27 May 1978 | 1 |
| 27 May 1978 | 1 | "(I'm Always Touched by Your) Presence, Dear" | Blondie | 10 | 27 May 1978 | 1 |
| 3 June 1978 | 15 | "You're the One That I Want" (#2) | John Travolta & Olivia Newton-John | 1 | 17 June 1978 | 9 |
| 3 June 1978 | 1 | "What a Waste" | Ian Dury & The Blockheads | 9 | 3 June 1978 | 1 |
| 3 June 1978 | 4 | "Ça plane pour moi" | Plastic Bertrand | 8 | 24 June 1978 | 1 |
| 10 June 1978 | 1 | "Ole Ola (Mulher Brasileira)" ^{[E]} | Rod Stewart & The Scottish World Cup Squad | 4 | 10 June 1978 | 1 |
| 17 June 1978 | 5 | "Miss You" | The Rolling Stones | 3 | 17 June 1978 | 1 |
| 17 June 1978 | 2 | "Oh Carol" | Smokie | 5 | 17 June 1978 | 1 |
| 17 June 1978 | 3 | "Davy's on the Road Again" | Manfred Mann's Earth Band | 6 | 17 June 1978 | 2 |
| 17 June 1978 | 5 | "Annie's Song" | James Galway | 3 | 1 July 1978 | 2 |
| 17 June 1978 | 9 | "The Smurf Song" (#5) | Father Abraham & The Smurfs | 2 | 24 June 1978 | 6 |
| 24 June 1978 | 3 | "Making Up Again" | Goldie | 7 | 24 June 1978 | 1 |
| 1 July 1978 | 5 | "Airport" | The Motors | 4 | 8 July 1978 | 1 |
| 1 July 1978 | 4 | "The Man with the Child in His Eyes" | Kate Bush | 6 | 8 July 1978 | 1 |
| 1 July 1978 | 7 | "Dancing in the City" | Marshall Hain | 3 | 15 July 1978 | 2 |
| 8 July 1978 | 5 | "Like Clockwork" | The Boomtown Rats | 6 | 15 July 1978 | 3 |
| 15 July 1978 | 1 | "No One Is Innocent"/"My Way" | Sex Pistols | 7 | 15 July 1978 | 1 |
| 15 July 1978 | 4 | "A Little Bit of Soap" | Showaddywaddy | 5 | 22 July 1978 | 1 |
| 22 July 1978 | 6 | "Substitute" | Clout | 2 | 5 August 1978 | 2 |
| 22 July 1978 | 4 | "Wild West Hero" | Electric Light Orchestra | 6 | 5 August 1978 | 1 |
| 22 July 1978 | 6 | "Boogie Oogie Oogie" | A Taste of Honey | 3 | 12 August 1978 | 1 |
| 29 July 1978 | 1 | "Run For Home" | Lindisfarne | 10 | 29 July 1978 | 1 |
| 5 August 1978 | 2 | "5.7.0.5" ^{[F]} | City Boy | 8 | 19 August 1978 | 1 |
| 12 August 1978 | 8 | "Three Times a Lady" (#4) | Commodores | 1 | 19 August 1978 | 5 |
| 12 August 1978 | 4 | "Forever Autumn" | Justin Hayward | 5 | 26 August 1978 | 1 |
| 12 August 1978 | 2 | "If the Kids Are United" | Sham 69 | 9 | 12 August 1978 | 2 |
| 19 August 1978 | 6 | "It's Raining" | Darts | 2 | 2 September 1978 | 1 |
| 19 August 1978 | 1 | "Northern Lights" | Renaissance | 10 | 19 August 1978 | 1 |
| 26 August 1978 | 7 | "Dreadlock Holiday" | 10cc | 1 | 23 September 1978 | 1 |
| 26 August 1978 | 4 | "Supernature" | Cerrone | 8 | 26 August 1978 | 3 |
| 26 August 1978 | 6 | "Jilted John" | Jilted John | 4 | 23 September 1978 | 1 |
| 2 September 1978 | 5 | "Oh What a Circus" | David Essex | 3 | 23 September 1978 | 1 |
| 2 September 1978 | 1 | "It's Only Make Believe" | Child | 10 | 2 September 1978 | 1 |
| 9 September 1978 | 2 | "British Hustle" | Hi-Tension | 8 | 16 September 1978 | 1 |
| 9 September 1978 | 1 | "An Everlasting Love" | Andy Gibb | 10 | 9 September 1978 | 1 |
| 16 September 1978 | 2 | "Hong Kong Garden" | Siouxsie and the Banshees | 7 | 16 September 1978 | 1 |
| 16 September 1978 | 4 | "Kiss You All Over" | Exile | 6 | 23 September 1978 | 1 |
| 23 September 1978 | 3 | "Summer Night City" | ABBA | 5 | 7 October 1978 | 1 |
| 23 September 1978 | 5 | "Grease" | Frankie Valli | 3 | 30 September 1978 | 2 |
| 30 September 1978 | 9 | "Summer Nights" (#3) | John Travolta & Olivia Newton-John | 1 | 30 September 1978 | 7 |
| 30 September 1978 | 5 | "Love Don't Live Here Anymore" | Rose Royce | 2 | 7 October 1978 | 2 |
| 7 October 1978 | 5 | "Lucky Stars" | Dean Friedman | 3 | 21 October 1978 | 1 |
| 7 October 1978 | 4 | "I Can't Stop Loving You (Though I Try)" | Leo Sayer | 6 | 14 October 1978 | 1 |
| 7 October 1978 | 3 | "You Make Me Feel (Mighty Real)" | Sylvester | 8 | 7 October 1978 | 1 |
| 7 October 1978 | 6 | "Rasputin" | Boney M. | 2 | 21 October 1978 | 2 |
| 14 October 1978 | 5 | "Sweet Talkin' Woman" | Electric Light Orchestra | 6 | 21 October 1978 | 3 |
| 14 October 1978 | 7 | "Sandy" | John Travolta | 2 | 4 November 1978 | 1 |
| 14 October 1978 | 1 | "Now That We've Found Love" | Third World | 10 | 14 October 1978 | 1 |
| 21 October 1978 | 8 | "Rat Trap" (#8) | The Boomtown Rats | 1 | 18 November 1978 | 2 |
| 28 October 1978 | 4 | "MacArthur Park" | Donna Summer | 5 | 28 October 1978 | 3 |
| 28 October 1978 | 4 | "Blame It on the Boogie" | The Jacksons | 8 | 4 November 1978 | 2 |
| 4 November 1978 | 1 | "Public Image" | Public Image Ltd | 9 | 4 November 1978 | 1 |
| 4 November 1978 | 1 | "Hurry Up Harry" | Sham 69 | 10 | 4 November 1978 | 1 |
| 11 November 1978 | 5 | "Hopelessly Devoted to You" | Olivia Newton-John | 2 | 18 November 1978 | 2 |
| 11 November 1978 | 4 | "Darlin'" | Frankie Miller | 6 | 11 November 1978 | 3 |
| 11 November 1978 | 4 | "My Best Friend's Girl" | The Cars | 3 | 25 November 1978 | 1 |
| 18 November 1978 | 3 | "Pretty Little Angel Eyes" | Showaddywaddy | 5 | 25 November 1978 | 1 |
| 18 November 1978 | 3 | "Instant Replay" | Dan Hartman | 8 | 18 November 1978 | 3 |
| 25 November 1978 | 6 | "Da Ya Think I'm Sexy?" | Rod Stewart | 1 | 2 December 1978 | 1 |
| 25 November 1978 | 4 | "Hanging on the Telephone" | Blondie | 5 | 2 December 1978 | 1 |
| 2 December 1978 | 7 | "Mary's Boy Child – Oh My Lord" (#6) | Boney M. | 1 | 9 December 1978 | 4 |
| 2 December 1978 | 6 | "I Lost My Heart to a Starship Trooper" | Sarah Brightman & Hot Gossip | 6 | 9 December 1978 | 2 |
| 9 December 1978 | 6 | "Too Much Heaven" ^{[G]} | Bee Gees | 3 | 9 December 1978 | 1 |
| 9 December 1978 | 6 | "A Taste of Aggro" | The Barron Knights | 3 | 23 December 1978 | 2 |
| 9 December 1978 | 8 | "Le Freak" | Chic | 7 | 16 December 1978 | 2 |
| 9 December 1978 | 2 | "Always and Forever"/"Mind Blowing Decisions" | Heatwave | 9 | 9 December 1978 | 2 |
| 16 December 1978 | 9 | "Y.M.C.A." ♦ | The Village People | 1 | 6 January 1979 | 3 |
| 16 December 1978 | 5 | "You Don't Bring Me Flowers" | Barbra Streisand & Neil Diamond | 5 | 23 December 1978 | 2 |
| 23 December 1978 | 7 | "Lay Your Love on Me" ♦ | Racey | 3 | 6 January 1979 | 3 |
| 23 December 1978 | 5 | "Song for Guy" ♦ | Elton John | 4 | 13 January 1979 | 1 |

== Entries by artist ==
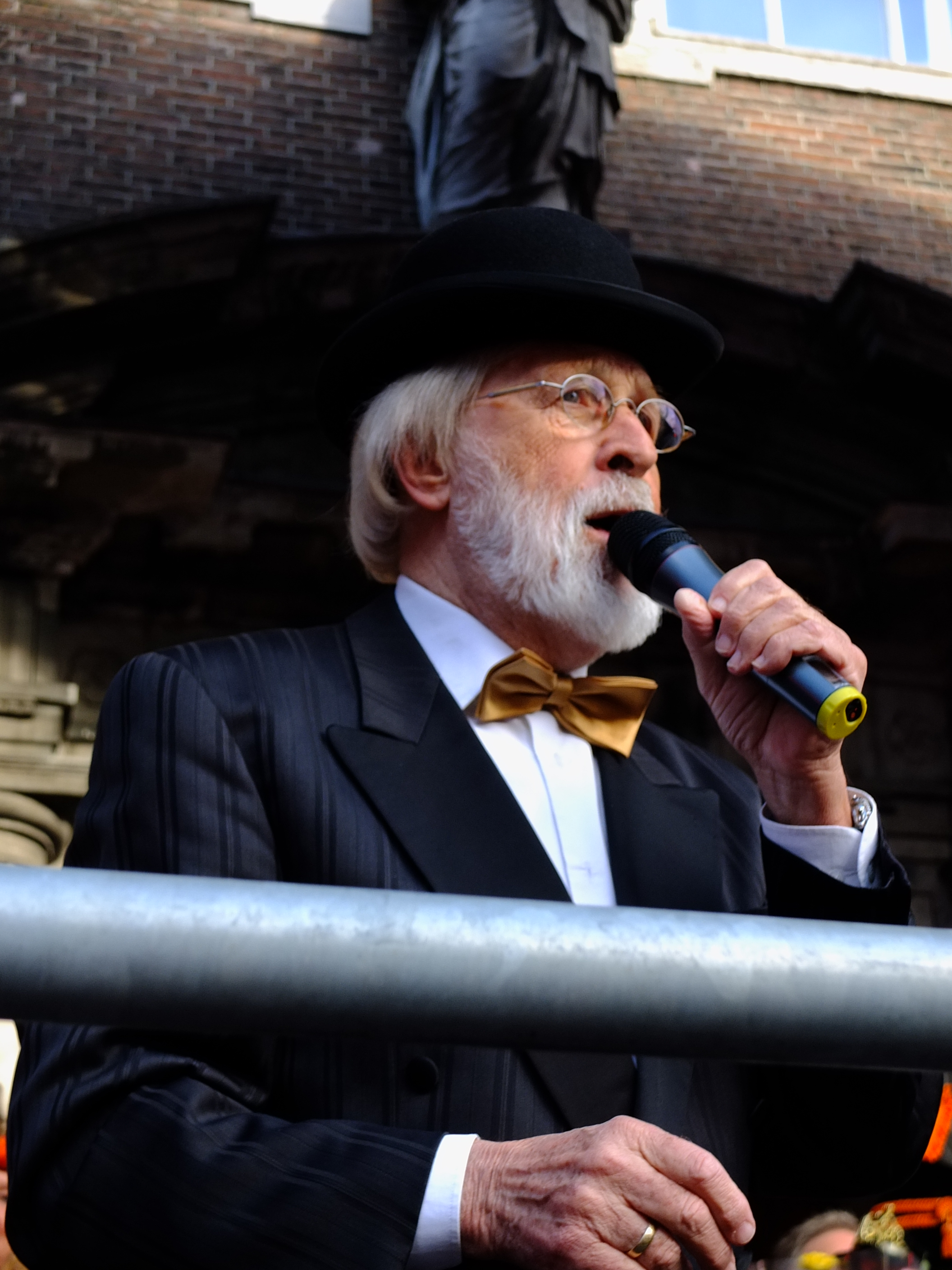
Dutch singer Pierre Kartner (a.k.a. Father Abraham) collaborated with The Smurfs on "The Smurf Song", which spent six consecutive weeks at number two in the UK.

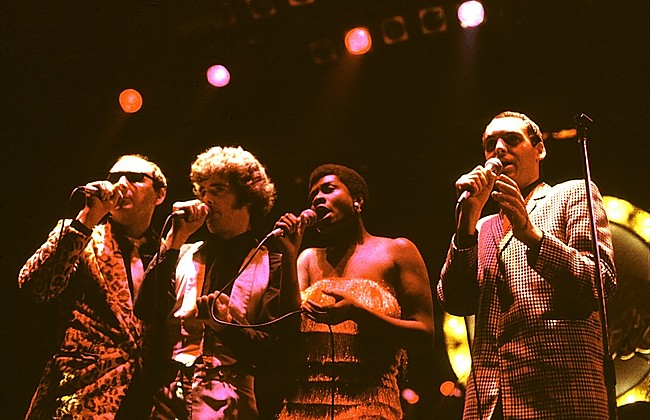
Doo-wop revival group Darts achieved three consecutive number two singles in 1978; "Come Back My Love", "The Boy from New York City" and "It's Raining".

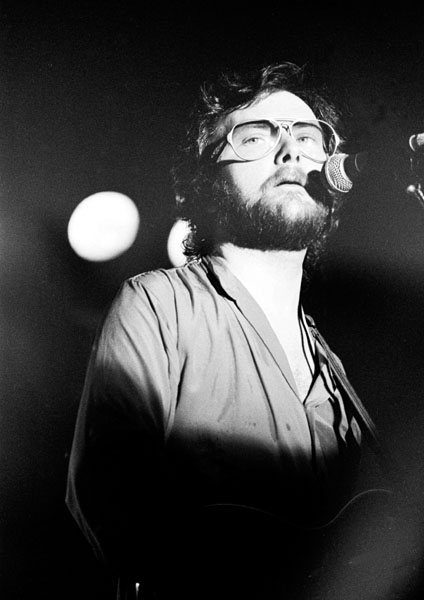
Gerry Rafferty spent eight weeks in the top 10 this year with "Baker Street", which peaked at number three.

The following table shows artists who achieved two or more top 10 entries in 1978, including singles that reached their peak in 1977. The figures include both main artists and featured artists, while appearances on ensemble charity records are also counted for each artist. The total number of weeks an artist spent in the top ten in 1978 is also shown.

| Entries | Artist | Weeks | Singles |
|---|---|---|---|
| 4 | Bee Gees ^{[H]} | 19 | "How Deep Is Your Love", "Night Fever", "Stayin' Alive", "Too Much Heaven" |
| 4 | Darts ^{[H]} | 20 | "Come Back My Love", "Daddy Cool/The Girl Can't Help It", "It's Raining", "The Boy from New York City" |
| 3 | Blondie | 11 | "Denis", "Hanging on the Telephone", "(I'm Always Touched by Your) Presence, Dear" |
| 3 | Boney M. | 30 | "Mary's Boy Child – Oh My Lord", "Rasputin", "Rivers of Babylon"/"Brown Girl in the Ring" |
| 3 | Chic | 9 | "Dance, Dance, Dance (Yowsah, Yowsah, Yowsah)", "Everybody Dance", "Le Freak" |
| 3 | Donna Summer ^{[I]} | 11 | "I Love You", "Love's Unkind", "MacArthur Park" |
| 3 | Electric Light Orchestra | 14 | "Mr. Blue Sky", "Sweet Talkin' Woman", "Wild West Hero" |
| 3 | John Travolta | 31 | "Sandy", "Summer Nights", "You're the One That I Want" |
| 3 | Olivia Newton-John | 29 | "Hopelessly Devoted to You", "Summer Nights", "You're the One That I Want" |
| 3 | Rod Stewart | 9 | "Da Ya Think I'm Sexy?", "Hot Legs"/"I Was Only Joking", "Ole Ola (Mulher Brasileira)" |
| 3 | Showaddywaddy | 12 | "A Little Bit of Soap", "I Wonder Why", "Pretty Little Angel Eyes" |
| 2 | ABBA | 11 | "Summer Night City", "Take a Chance on Me" |
| 2 | Bob Marley and the Wailers | 3 | "Is This Love", "Jamming"/"Punky Reggae Party" |
| 2 | The Boomtown Rats | 13 | "Like Clockwork", "Rat Trap" |
| 2 | Kate Bush | 11 | "The Man with the Child in His Eyes", "Wuthering Heights" |
| 2 | Rose Royce | 11 | "Love Don't Live Here Anymore", "Wishing on a Star" |
| 2 | Sham 69 | 3 | "Hurry Up Harry", "If the Kids Are United" |
| 2 | Wings ^{[H]} | 10 | "Mull of Kintyre"/"Girls' School", "With a Little Luck" |

== Notes ==
- ^{a} "Y.M.C.A" reached its peak of number-one on 6 January 1979 (week ending).
- ^{b} "Lay Your Love on Me" reached its peak of number three on 6 January 1979 (week ending).
- ^{c} "Ally's Tartan Army" was released to celebrate the Scotland national team's qualification for the 1978 FIFA World Cup.
- ^{d} "Rivers of Babylon"/"Brown Girl In the Ring" re-entered the top 10 at number 10 on 5 August 1978 (week ending) for 9 weeks.
- ^{e} "Ole Ola (Mulher Brasileira)" was recorded by the Scotland national team (with the added vocals of Rod Stewart) as the official single supporting their 1978 FIFA World Cup campaign.
- ^{f} "5.7.0.5" re-entered the top 10 at number 8 on 19 August 1978 (week ending).
- ^{g} "Too Much Heaven" was released as a charity single in aid of Unicef and was performed at the Music for UNICEF Concert in January 1979.
- ^{h} Figure includes single that peaked in 1977.
- ^{i} Figure includes single that first charted in 1977 but peaked in 1978.

== See also ==
- 1978 in British music
- List of number-one singles from the 1970s (UK)
