= Going In with My Eyes Open =

1977 single by David Soul

Single by David Soul

from the album Playing to an Audience of One
- A-side: "Going in with My Eyes Open"
- B-side: "Topanga"
- Released: 18 March 1977
- Genre: Pop
- Songwriter: Tony Macaulay

David Soul singles chronology
"Don't Give Up on Us" (1976)	"Going In with My Eyes Open" (1977)	"Silver Lady" (1977)

"Going In with My Eyes Open" is a 1977 single written by Tony Macaulay and recorded by David Soul. The song was featured on Soul's second studio album, Playing to an Audience of One, and was first released as a single in the UK on 18 March 1977, and in the US a month later. The b-side to the UK single is "Topanga".

== Covers ==
The song was covered on a 1977Top of the Pops album and by Maxwell Plumm, also in 1977.

== Reception ==
The song performed well commercially, although not up to the same standards as his previous single, "Don't Give Up On Us". It spent three weeks at number two in the UK in March and April 1977, preventing from reaching the top by "Knowing Me, Knowing You" by ABBA. It also went to number seven in Ireland, number ten in Australia, number twelve in New Zealand and Belgium, and number thirteen in Netherlands. It didn't do well in the Top 100 American and Canadian charts, peaking at number 54 and 58 respectively, but did better in their Adult Contemporary charts, both reaching number fourteen.

== Personnel ==
- David Soul — vocals
- Rick Vito — guitar
- Andy Kulberg — bass
- Tom Hensley — piano
- Jim Hodder — drums

== Charts ==
Chart	Peak position
Australia Kent Music Report	10
Belgium Ultratop	12
Canada Singles Chart	58
Canada Adult Contemporary	14
Ireland Irish Charts	7
Netherlands Dutch Single Top 100	13
New Zealand Official New Zealand Music Chart	12
UK Official Singles Chart	2
US Billboard Hot 100	58
US Adult Contemporary	14
