= Ariel (song) =

- Side A of the US single

Single by Dean Friedman

from the album Dean Friedman
- B-side: "Funny Papers"
- Released: April 1977
- Genre: Soft rock
- Length: 3:22 (single version); 4:22 (album version)
- Label: Lifesong
- Songwriter: Dean Friedman
- Producer: Rob Stevens

Dean Friedman singles chronology
"Ariel" (1977)	"Woman of Mine" (1977)

"Ariel" is a hit single written and performed by Dean Friedman, released in April 1977. It was the first of two hits from Friedman's eponymous debut LP. "Ariel," however, was his only hit in North America. It reached number 26 on the U.S. Billboard Hot 100 chart, number 17 on the Cashbox Top 100, and number 19 in Canada. The song spent 22 weeks on the Billboard chart and 24 weeks on Cashbox.

== Background ==
"Ariel" has been described as a "quirkily irresistible and uncategorizable pop song about a free-spirited, music-loving, vegetarian Jewish girl" from Paramus, New Jersey, where Friedman grew up. The lyrics describe the young girl from "deep in the bosom of suburbia," who sang "mighty fine," with "'Tears on My Pillow' and 'Ave Maria'." It describes the girl Ariel, "standing by the [since dismantled] waterfall at Paramus Park," one of the many shopping malls in Paramus. The quarters she was collecting for "friends of BAI" refers to the New York radio station WBAI, and their listener association, while the song also makes reference to "channel 2", which refers to local CBS flagship station WCBS-TV.

Chicago radio superstation WLS, which gave the song much airplay, ranked "Ariel" as the 60th most popular hit of 1977. It reached as high as number four on their survey of August 20, 1977.

== Controversy ==
The record label (Lifesong) that produced "Ariel" insisted Friedman change the song's second verse, which refers to the eponymous Ariel as "a Jewish girl", believing that radio stations might use it as an excuse not to play the record. The management company received threats from the Jewish Defense League protesting against the edit in the single, which also varied from the album version by having the third verse removed to make the single shorter for radio.

== Chart performance ==
=== Weekly charts ===
Chart (1977)	Peak position
Australia (Kent Music Report)	91
Canada RPM Top Singles	19
New Zealand (RIANZ)	19
U.S. Billboard Hot 100	26
U.S. Cash Box Top 100	17

=== Year-end charts ===
Chart (1977)	Rank
Canada	148
U.S. Billboard Hot 100	69
U.S. Cash Box	92

== Other versions ==
- Ariel Pink covered the song in his Ariel (Friedman) EP released in 2006, with his version also appearing in his 2021 rarities compilation Archevil.

== See also ==
- List of 1970s one-hit wonders in the United States
