= Denise Marsa =

Singer/songwriter & mentor living in NYC, USA

Denise Marsa is an American singer, songwriter, music producer, entrepreneur, and founder of KeyMedia Group. She is known for her music career, as well as her work in public relations and music production.

== Early life and education ==
Marsa was born in Trenton, New Jersey, and spent part of her childhood in Tucson, Arizona. She attended the University of Arizona, where she majored in Theater Arts and later studied English Literature at The College of New Jersey.

Marsa began her music career as a vocalist in the 1970s. She achieved success with the duet "Lucky Stars" with Dean Friedman, which became a hit in the UK. She also was the lead vocalist on the dance track "Helpless (You Took My Love)" by The Flirts.

In the 1990s, while living in London, Marsa signed a contract as a songwriter with Warner Bros. in the UK. Later, she moved to Los Angeles and continued working with Warner/Chappell. After experiencing setbacks with her publishing deals, she decided to create her own indie record label, KeyMedia Group, in 1998. She self-produced and released her debut album, SELF, which received critical acclaim.

== Career ==
In 2008, Marsa founded KeyMedia Public Relations. As the Owner of both KeyMedia Group (the record label) and KeyMedia Public Relations, Marsa has led the company in offering creative, strategic, and advisory services to clients in arts and entertainment. Over the years, the company has helped indie artists, musicians, photographers, authors, and other entertainment professionals gain exposure and grow their careers.

In 2010, Marsa established Denise Marsa Productions, a full-service production, music production, and event management company. It focuses on releasing music for indie artists and representing master recordings for TV and film placements.

In May 2021, Marsa combined all three companies to form a boutique agency Marsa Media Inc. Marsa Media Inc. which is based in New York City. It provides a wide range of services to clients in the music industry and beyond, continuing Marsa's work in promoting and supporting creative professionals.

== Awards and recognition ==
Denise Marsa has received much recognition and several awards throughout her career. In 2024 her third solo album, Pivotal received glowing reviews and 4 remixes from the album charted in the Top 10 consecutively on the UK’s Music Week Commercial Pop Club Charts.

In 2021 her one-woman show THE PASS the show was awarded Best Concert Award at the United Solo Festival in NYC. In 2018 she debuted THE PASS in London at the Playground Theatre (THE PASS Review)

In 2013, her song Steady from the album Live Forever won the Best Adult Contemporary Recording at the New Mexico Music Awards.

In 2005, Marsa was a guest panelist at New York University's Entrepreneur Career Week, where she shared her experiences as a new entrepreneur.

In 1985 Marsa was the lead voice on Helpless (You Took My Love) by The Flirts, produced by Bobby Orlando. The track went to the top of the Billboard International Dance Charts.

In 1978 Marsa was recognized with a Platinum Record by the British Phonographic Industry (BPI) for the duet Lucky Stars with Dean Friedman.

== Personal life ==
Denise Marsa has resided in Greenwich Village since first arriving in New York City in 1976 (New York Times - Since 1976, Denise Marsa, a singer-songwriter, has lived in her tidy studio around the corner, in the building Ms. Martin once owned at 18 Christopher Street) and also spends time in West Hollywood. She is passionate about music and its influence and importance in society and is committed to her work helping others with their work, as the founder and team leader at Marsa Media.

== Discography ==
Singles & EPs

- Dry Spell (Until Dawn Remixes) (2025)
- Kiss Me in the Rain (2024)
- You Should Have Asked (2024)
- Don't Count Yourself Out Yet (2024)
- Stop (2024)
- The Pendulum (2024)
- Rainbow Until Dawn (Remix) (2024)
- All This Time Alone (2021)
- Roll with Me (2024)
- The Blues (2024)
- Dry Spell (2024)
- Swimming (2024)
- Underneath (2024)
- Persuasion (2023)
- Rainbow (2023)
- Sanctuary (2023)
- Float (2022)

Albums

- Pivotal (2024)
- Live Forever (2023)
- Self (2023)
- Second Soul (2022)
