= Mr Big (British band) =

British pop rock band

Mr Big were a British pop rock band, active in the 1970s and 1990s. They were formed by Jeff Pain (aka Dicken) and best known for their 1977 Top 5 hit, "Romeo". The band was originally active from 1972–78 and then for a second period from 1990–98.

== Biography ==
The members of Mr Big had been playing together since the late 1960s, under the name 'Burnt Oak'. They first played under the name, 'Mr Big', in 1972, at the Marquee Club in Wardour Street, London, when the manager billed them as Mr Big instead of Burnt Oak. The manager refused to change it, so it stuck for the rest of the band's career.

In 1974, the band signed to Epic Records, releasing three singles, none of which made a significant breakthrough, but which did lead to appearances on Lift Off, a TV pop show presented by Ayesha Brough.

In 1975, Bob Hirschman, then manager of Mott the Hoople, took over as the band's manager. Their first album, Sweet Silence, was released on EMI, to greater acclaim than their previous singles. Promotional TV appearances for this album included Supersonic with Mike Mansfield and Superpop. In November 1975, Mr Big supported Queen on their A Night at the Opera tour.

In 1976, Mr Big embarked on their own UK headline tour and supported Sweet on their tour of Europe, performing on TV in Denmark, the Netherlands and the UK. Mr Big were also the first British band to be signed to Clive Davis's Arista Records in America. They recorded their second album, Photographic Smile, in Los Angeles, California, with Val Garay.

In 1977, the band toured the United States in February, March and April with Tom Petty, Journey, Kansas and The Runaways. Meanwhile, the single "Romeo" reached No. 4 in the UK Singles Chart, despite a temporary ban by the BBC. It also peaked at No 44 in Australia. It also sold well in Japan, the U.S. and parts of Europe, and was covered in 1977 by the South African band 'Pendulum'. The follow-up single "Feel Like Calling Home" failed to capitalise on the success of the previous one, and only reached No. 35 in UK. The band embarked on a UK headline tour with more television appearances in the UK and Europe.

In 1978, the third album Seppuku was recorded with Ian Hunter as producer and the band again toured the UK. They appeared on Top Of The Pops with "Senora", and split up soon afterwards.

== After the breakup ==
Dicken and bassist Pete Crowther went on to form another band named Broken Home, which released two albums and played the Reading Festival in 1980, also scoring a couple of minor hits in Norway and Germany. Dicken has since collaborated with a variety of different artists under various names, as well as releasing solo material and performing 'Mr. Big Greatest Hits' tours. The current Mr Big consists of originals Dicken and Eddie Carter with new members on bass, keyboards and percussion. Their album, Rainbow Bridge, was released in 1996.

== Discography ==
=== Albums ===
- Sweet Silence (EMI, 1975)
- Photographic Smile (Arista, 1977) (US release consisting of songs from Sweet Silence and Mr. Big)
- Mr. Big (EMI, 1977)
- Rainbow Bridge (Rock Shop, 1996)
- Seppuku (Angel Air, 2001) (originally recorded in 1978, but was not released)
- Bitter Streets (Soundfactor, 2011)

=== Singles ===
Year	Single	Peak chart positions				Certifications
Year	Single	AUS	NL	UK	US	Certifications
1974	"Genevieve"	—	—	—	—	
1974	"Eee I'm All Right"	—	—	—	—	
1974	"Christmas with Dicken"	—	—	—	—	
1975	"Lucky Man"	—	—	—	—	
1975	"Wonderful Creation"	—	—	—	—	
1976	"For the Fun to Find"	—	—	—	—	
1976	"Zambia"	—	—	—	—	
1977	"Romeo"	44	24	4	87	BPI: Silver
1977	"Feel Like Calling Home"	—	—	35	—	
1977	"Hold Me" (Germany-only release)	—	—	—	—	
1978	"Senora"	—	—	—	—	
"—" denotes releases that did not chart or were not released

== See also ==
- List of performers on Top of the Pops
