= Lucky Stars (song) =

1978 single by Dean Friedman

Single by Dean Friedman

from the album "Well, Well," Said the Rocking Chair
- B-side: "The Deli Song (Corned Beef on Wry)"
- Released: 1 September 1978
- Genre: Soft rock
- Length: 3:58
- Label: Lifesong
- Songwriter(s): Dean Friedman
- Producer(s): Rob Stevens

Dean Friedman singles chronology
"Woman of Mine" (1978)	"Lucky Stars" (1978)	"Lydia" (1978)

"Lucky Stars" is a song by American singer-songwriter Dean Friedman, released in 1978 by Lifesong Records as a single from his album "Well, Well," Said the Rocking Chair. Despite not being credited on the single, the song is a duet with Denise Marsa. The song is about a jealous wife whose husband has bumped into a former girlfriend called Lisa. It was a hit in the UK, where it peaked at number 3 on the Singles Chart.

== Background ==
Friedman and Marsa first met when Marsa was auditioning for manager Don Puluse at Columbia Recording Studios. Friedman then went to one of her shows in a club in New York. Then, a few weeks later they bumped into each other in West Village, where Marsa lived. Friedman then called her to say he had written a song with her in mind to sing it. Marsa went over to his apartment and suggested that they sing it together with her adding a harmony. The record company neglected to put her name on the credits of the single. However, she was included on the album credits. As time went on she has been known as "the Mystery Voice" or "the Mystery Lady" and Friedman says that who she is is one of the most common questions he is asked at interviews. Marsa said it was an "on-going issue collecting royalties" and she was not paid any royalties until 2008.

== Following ==
The huge success of "Lucky Stars" has led Friedman to have retained a cult following. In 1995, Gaby Roslin, while hosting the television show The Big Breakfast, was surprised by her staff who presented her with a large box with Friedman in it. He then went on to perform the song, with Roslin singing the female part. Another famous fan includes Dawn French, whose then-husband Lenny Henry had Friedman flown in to sing the song as a surprise for her 50th birthday party in 2008.

== Track listings ==
1. "Lucky Stars" – 3:58
2. "The Deli Song (Corned Beef on Wry) – 3:11

== Charts ==
=== Weekly charts ===
Chart (1978–1979)	Peak position
Australia (Kent Music Report)	6
Ireland (IRMA)	3
New Zealand (Recorded Music NZ)	8
UK Singles (OCC)	3

=== Year-end charts ===
Chart (1978)	Position
UK Singles	25
Chart (1979)	Position
Australia (Kent Music Report)	44
