= Dean Friedman =

American singer-songwriter (born 1955)

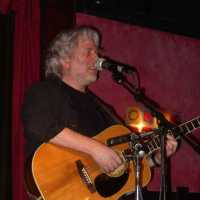
- Dean Friedman in concert; April 18, 2007 in New York

Background information
- Born: May 23, 1955 (age 71); Paramus, New Jersey, U.S.
- Genres: Soft rock, pop, folk
- Occupations: Singer, songwriter, producer, author, virtual reality designer, video game designer
- Instruments: Guitar, piano, electronic keyboard, harmonica, vocals
- Years active: 1977–present
- Website: www.deanfriedman.com

Dean Friedman (born 1955) is an American singer-songwriter who plays piano, keyboard, guitar, and harmonica.

Although considered a one-hit wonder in the US, he has had multiple singles chart in other territories and continues to write, record, and tour.

== Music ==
Born and raised in Paramus, New Jersey, United States, Friedman purchased his first guitar from Manny's Music with a bag of quarters he had saved, at age nine in 1964, and started writing songs. When he was a teenager, he played weddings and bar mitzvahs as part of Marsha and the Self-Portraits, sent out demos and majored in music at City College of New York where one of his teachers was guitarist David Bromberg. By the time he was 20, in 1975, he had a manager and a recording contract with Cashman and West's Lifesong label.

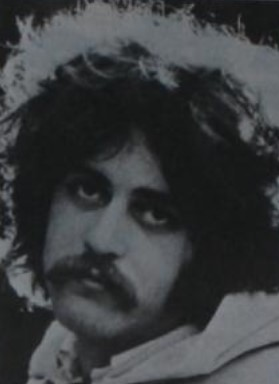
Friedman in 1977

In the United States he is described as a one-hit wonder, following his 1977 hit song "Ariel", which reached number 26 on the Billboard Hot 100 chart and stayed in the chart for five months. American Top 40 ranked it as the 87th biggest hit of 1977. On the Cash Box Top 100, it reached number 17. In Canada, the song reached number 19.

"Ariel" has been described as a "quirkily irresistible and uncategorizable pop song about a free spirited, music loving, vegetarian Jewish girl," from Paramus, New Jersey, where he grew up. It is the only Billboard Top 40 song to contain the word Paramus. It describes the girl Ariel, "standing by the [since dismantled] waterfall at Paramus Park," one of the many shopping malls in Paramus. The quarters she was collecting for "friends of BAI" refers to the New York radio station WBAI, and their listener association; the song also makes reference to "channel 2", the local CBS flagship station WCBS-TV.

Although "Ariel" did not make the UK Singles Chart, "Lucky Stars", a duet with Denise Marsa taken from his second album Well Well Said the Rocking Chair, made No. 3 in the UK in late 1978, and both "Woman of Mine" and "Lydia" were lesser chart hits there.

Friedman also provided vocals for a series of television commercials in the 1970s in the New York City metro area. However, while he did re-record and perform one version for an employee event, Friedman is falsely credited with creating and singing on the jingle for electronics chain Crazy Eddie's "When you think you're ready, come down to Crazy Eddie", which was actually created, performed, produced and recorded in its various versions (doo-wop, disco and other versions) by Larry Weiss (Crazy Eddie's VP Advertising) along with Jeff Gottschalk and John Russo.

Friedman's single "McDonald's Girl" was officially banned by the BBC because the chorus mentioned the name of the fast food restaurant. In 2011, thirty years after the song was banned by the BBC, the McDonald's Corporation licensed "McDonald's Girl" for a national TV/Radio campaign, which aired in the US, featuring a vocal performance of the song by The Blenders.

During 2005, as part of a tie-in to one of his tour sponsors, Friedman's tour of the United Kingdom was almost canceled after it was revealed he intended to distribute cannabis seeds to purchasers of his new album. Although it is not illegal to own or distribute cannabis seeds in this manner "unless they get wet", the suggestion caused friction with a number of venues on the tour, so the intended distribution was not carried out.

== Influence ==
The songs of Dean Friedman have been covered by several contemporary bands, including The Barenaked Ladies, Ben Folds Five, Ariel Pink, The Tone Rangers, and The Blenders. The lead singer of Barenaked Ladies, Steve Page, sang background vocals on Friedman's album Songs For Grownups (1998).

== TV and films ==
Friedman has written, performed, and produced the theme music to several TV series including Boon (for which he did all of the music apart from the theme song which was performed by Jim Diamond), starring Michael Elphick. Other TV credits include Nick Arcade (Nickelodeon) and Eerie, Indiana (NBC). He also composed, performed, and produced the soundtrack to the 1990 cult horror film, I Bought a Vampire Motorcycle, in which he performs the track "She Runs on Blood, Not Gasoline".

== Other (non-musical) work ==
In 1985, Friedman produced a seminal work on the newly emerging synthesizer industry called Complete Guide to Synthesizers, Sequencers, and Drum Machines. Whilst dated, this tome published by New York Amsco is still of use in evaluating devices that crop up on the second-hand market. Friedman also set up the New York School of Synthesis and provided a series of videos entitled Intro to Synthesis. Friedman presents the rudiments of this topic in an audio-visual format, whilst incorporating a unique sense of humor.

In 1986, Friedman saw a demo of a powerful virtual reality program that put the user right inside a video game using a video camera (similar to the technology used by the EyeToy). Friedman was impressed by the technology and wrote an article for Electronic Musician magazine. In 1989, he designed a game called Eat-A-Bug which was licensed to Nickelodeon, used on the series Total Panic and served as a prototype for the series Nick Arcade, for which Friedman produced a dozen games. He is now the President and Creative Director of InVideo games.

== Revival ==
Friedman's 2002 album The Treehouse Journals was financed entirely by his fans via his website. Friedman invited people to finance the cost of the as-yet unrecorded album by making an advance purchase and by making limited edition signed copies available. This tactic has been adopted by other bands, including Marillion. He continued to tour, playing small venues.

He copied this tactic again in 2005 with the album Squirrels in the Attic and once more, in 2017, with 12 Songs.

== SongFest ==
Friedman organizes an annual "micro music festival" in Rugby, Warwickshire, England. It features various under-recognized musicians, with noted names such as Kiki Dee performing. It is indoors at a hotel, and lasts two days.

== Family ==
Friedman has lived in New York since 2007 with his wife, Alison, and two children, Hannah Friedman and Sam Friedman, both of whom have appeared as a backing singer or musician on his later works.

== Dean Friedman and Half Man Half Biscuit ==
The British band Half Man Half Biscuit recorded (in 1987, on the album Back Again in the DHSS) a song entitled "The Bastard Son of Dean Friedman", a claim Friedman considered improbable, as he was only seven years old when lyricist Nigel Blackwell was conceived. At the Edinburgh Festival in 2003, The Scotsman newspaper arranged a get together between Friedman and the band, in which he acknowledged that Blackwell had at least surmised right the underlying story in the song "Lucky Stars": "That guy Nigel was hip to the fact [song character] Lisa and I didn't just do lunch. You can't interpret a song that way unless you understand what it's about." It also transpired that Blackwell had a copy of a rare vinyl version of Well Well Said the Rocking Chair.

In 2009, Friedman wrote a "reply" called "A Baker's Tale", in which he firmly placed Blackwell's parentage as being that of the local baker, posting it on Half Man Half Biscuit's MySpace site. The band mentioned it on their own website as "Dean Friedman's Revenge/Dean Friedman strikes back". On September 15, 2010, Dean Friedman appeared at a Half Man Half Biscuit gig at the Robin 2 venue in Bilston, West Midlands (UK) and performed "A Baker's Tale". Half Man Half Biscuit's riposte was "The Bastard Son of Dean Friedman". Friedman's song is included on his 2010 album Submarine Races.

== Discography ==
=== Albums ===
- Deano's Demos Vol. 1 (1976)
- Dean Friedman (1977)
- "Well, Well" Said the Rocking Chair (1978) – UK #21, AUS #70
- Rumpled Romeo (1981)
- Live! At The Duke of York (1985)
- Music From "Boon" (TV soundtrack) (1986)
- I Bought a Vampire Motorcycle (Movie soundtrack) (1990)
- The Very Best of Dean Friedman (1991)
- Bloomsbury Live! (1995)
- Dean Friedman in Concert – Shepherds Bush Empire (1998)
- Songs for Grownups (1998)
- The Treehouse Journals (2002)
- A Million Matzoh Balls (2003)
- Squirrels in the Attic (2005)
- Dean's "Kids Songs" (2007)
- Submarine Races (2010)
- Words & Music (2014)
- 12 Songs (2017)
- American Lullaby (2021)

=== Chart singles ===
Year	Title	US Billboard	US Cash Box	WLS Chicago	AUS	CAN	UK	NL	New Zealand
1977	"Ariel"	26	17	4	91	19	54 (Note: Chart position is from the official UK "Breakers List".)	—	19
1977	"Woman of Mine"	—	—	—	—	—	52	—	—
1978	"Lucky Stars"	—	—	—	6	—	3	—	8
1978	"Lydia"	—	—	—	—	—	31	29	—
1982	"McDonalds Girl"	—	—	—	99	—	—	—	—

=== DVDs ===
- Dean Friedman Live on the Isle of Wight (2009)

== See also ==
- List of 1970s one-hit wonders in the United States
