= I Remember Elvis Presley (The King Is Dead) =

Single by Danny Mirror
- B-side: "I Remember Elvis Presley (II)"
- Released: September 1977
- Length: 5:00
- Label: EMI
- Songwriter(s): Dick Bakker, Eddy Ouwens & Dunhills

"I Remember Elvis Presley (The King Is Dead)" is a song co-written by Dick Bakker, Eddy Ouwens and Dunhills, performed by Ouwens under the name of Danny Mirror. The song was dedicated to Elvis Presley, stating he is "the one and only king." It reached number 4 in the UK Singles Chart in October 1977.

In 1977, Canadian singer Johnny Farago (1944-1997) released cover versions both in French as "Je me souviens d’Elvis Presley" and also in English with the same lyrics as the original.

== Charts ==
=== Weekly charts ===
Chart (1977)	Peak position
Austria (Ö3 Austria Top 40)	17
Belgium (Ultratop 50 Flanders)	1
Belgium (Ultratop 50 Wallonia)	8
Netherlands (Dutch Top 40)	1
Netherlands (Single Top 100)	1
New Zealand (Recorded Music NZ)	7
Norway (VG-lista)	3
Sweden (Sverigetopplistan)	1
UK Singles (OCC)	4
West Germany (GfK)	10

=== Year-end charts ===
Chart (1977)	Position
Belgium (Ultratop Flanders)	8
Netherlands (Dutch Top 40)	23
Netherlands (Single Top 100)	19
