= Ally's Tartan Army =

Single by Andy Cameron
- B-side: "I Want To Be A Punk Rocker"
- Released: 1977
- Recorded: 1977
- Label: Klub Records
- Composer(s): S Dennison
- Lyricist(s): S Dennison

"Ally's Tartan Army" is a novelty record released by Scottish comedian Andy Cameron on the Klub Records (KRL) label to mark the Scottish football team's qualification for the 1978 World Cup in Argentina. The "Tartan Army" are Scotland's fans; "Ally" was team manager Ally MacLeod. The single sold over 360,000 copies and reached #6 in the charts.

== Overview ==
The tune of the chorus was based on the American Civil War song Tramp! Tramp! Tramp!. The tune has since been recycled by fans of many teams, altering the lyrics to incorporate their team and manager's name while replacing "Argentine" and "World Cup" with some more relevant location and cup competition (often Wembley and F.A Cup). It became "We're all part of Jackie's army" in Put 'Em Under Pressure, a Republic of Ireland song for the 1990 World Cup.

The B-side of Cameron's original record was "Ah want tae be a Punk Rocker", a satire of the then-current punk rock movement written by Peter Nardini.
