= Andy Cameron =

Scottish comedian (born 1940)

Andy Cameron MBE
- Born: 13 October 1940 (age 85); London, England

Andrew Graham Cameron (born 13 October 1940) is a Scottish comedian and television and radio broadcaster. He entered show business in the 1970s, working in clubs. Cameron performed "Ally's Tartan Army", the anthem for the Scotland national football team's appearance in the 1978 World Cup. He continued to work in the entertainment industry and as an after-dinner speaker.

== Early life ==
Cameron was born in London while his father, Hugh, was serving in the Army during World War II. Cameron was raised by his grandmother, Isabella Cameron, in the Royal Burgh of Rutherglen, south-east of Glasgow. Prior to pursuing this career he had worked for a time with the Glasgow-based structural engineering firm, Sir William Arrol & Co., and for Glasgow Corporation Transport.

== Career ==
Cameorn entered show business when he was 32. His act as a football hooligan led to him becoming a popular in Scottish football clubs. In 1975, he came second in New Faces, leading to several appearances on variety shows such as Live at Her Majesty’s with Jimmy Tarbuck and Tarby and Friends. In 1979, soon after the establishment of BBC Radio Scotland, he was given a thirteen-week contract to present a programme of music and humour. The show eventually ran for fifteen years. He was voted Radio Personality of the year in 1984. He had his own series on BBC Scotland in 1979 and again in 1982. He was awarded Scottish Television Personality of the Year for his 1983 series called It’s Andy Cameron.

Cameron is known for performing the song "Ally's Tartan Army" for the Scotland national football team's appearance at the 1978 World Cup. It reached number 6 in the UK Singles Chart and led to two appearances for Cameron on Top of the Pops in 1978. He put all of the profits from his single into producing an album, which he hoped to release while the World Cup fever in Scotland was still going strong.

In the early 1980s, Cameron was invited to speak in debates at Cambridge and Oxford Universities, alongside Arnold Brown and James Naughtie.

In 1984, Cameron presented STV's Hogmanay show. The following year he presented the BBC Scotland Hogmanay show and continued to do so until 1989. His last Hogmanay appearance was in 1990, in a short programme called Andy's Scottish Filling which preceded the live BBC Hogmanay Show.

In 1995, Cameron joined the cast of Take the High Road, the STV soap. He played a character called Chic Cherry until the last episode in 2003.

== Rangers FC ==
Cameron is a well-known supporter of Rangers F.C. In the early 1980s, he caused some controversy by attacking the club's anti-catholic signing policies at an Annual General Meeting of the club. He often had a 'stand-up' act on the pitch before Rangers' home league matches at Ibrox Stadium. In 1999, a follower of rival club Aberdeen F.C. ran from the away section to assault Cameron as he performed his routine. The assailant was banned by the club and fined at court. He presented a show on Clyde 2 on Sunday afternoons until late 2009.

== Honours ==
Cameron was appointed Member of the Order of the British Empire (MBE) in the 2015 New Year Honours for services to entertainment and charity in Glasgow.
