= Silver Lady (song) =

Single by David Soul

from the album Playing to an Audience of One
- B-side: "Rider"
- Released: August 1977
- Genre: Pop
- Label: Private Stock
- Songwriters: Tony Macaulay, Geoff Stephens
- Producer: Tony Macaulay

David Soul singles chronology
"Going In with My Eyes Open" (1977)	"Silver Lady" (1977)	"Let's Have a Quiet Night In" (1977)

"Silver Lady" is a pop single by David Soul. It was written by Tony Macaulay and Geoff Stephens and produced by Macaulay. It was released in 1977 and reached number one in the UK Singles Chart.

== Background ==
"Silver Lady" was the second and final number one hit on the UK Singles Chart for David Soul, spending three weeks at the top in October 1977. It had spent five weeks in the top ten before eventually toppling Elvis Presley. The single also spent four weeks at number one in Ireland, and peaked at number five in Australia, but fared less well in his homeland peaking at No. 52 on the Billboard Hot 100 and at number No.23 on the Easy Listening chart. It can be found on his second album Playing to an Audience of One.

In the UK, the song was used in the 2013 film Filth, with Soul miming the song while he kerb crawls in his car at night, eventually picking up a prostitute, with group of female singers in the back seat singing the chorus, and a 2014 television advert for bus operator National Express in which Soul is featured as a coach driver. As a result, the song re-entered the UK Charts at No. 145 in June 2014.

== Charts ==
=== Weekly charts ===
Chart (1977)	Peak position
Argentina	2
Australia (Kent Music Report)	8
Belgium (Ultratop 50 Flanders)	12
Belgium (Ultratop 50 Wallonia)	39
Canada (RPM)	70
Canada RPM Adult Contemporary	36
Ireland (IRMA)	1
Netherlands (Single Top 100)	16
New Zealand (Recorded Music NZ)	5
UK Singles (OCC)	1
US Adult Contemporary (Billboard)	23
US Billboard Hot 100	52

=== Year-end charts ===
Chart (1977)	Position
Australia (Kent Music Report)	56
Chart (1978)	Position
Australia (Kent Music Report)	94

== Certifications ==
Region	Certification	Certified units/sales
United Kingdom (BPI)	Gold	500,000^{^}
^{^} Shipments figures based on certification alone.
