= Don't Give Up on Us (song) =

Single by David Soul

from the album David Soul (only later editions)
- B-side: "Black Bean Soup"
- Released: 1976 (UK); January 1977 (U.S.)
- Recorded: 1976
- Genre: Soft rock
- Length: 3:32
- Label: Private Stock
- Songwriter: Tony Macaulay
- Producer: Tony Macaulay

David Soul singles chronology
"The Train" (1970)	"Don't Give Up on Us" (1976)	"Going in with My Eyes Open" (1977)

Official audio
- "Don't Give Up on Us" on YouTube

"Don't Give Up on Us" is a hit song recorded by American-British singer David Soul, and written by Tony Macaulay.

== Background ==
Riding high on the success of his role in the hit TV show Starsky and Hutch, Soul returned to singing, which had been one of his early career choices. His debut, the Tony Macaulay-written-and-produced song was a worldwide smash, spending four weeks at No. 1 on the UK Singles Chart in January and February 1977, and a single week at No. 1 on the Billboard Hot 100 in April 1977. In addition, the song spent one week at No. 1 on the U.S. Adult Contemporary chart. It has sold 1.16 million copies in the UK.

Its B-side, "Black Bean Soup", with lyrics by actor Gardner McKay, is a duet with actress Lynne Marta, whom Soul was involved with at the time.

"Don't Give Up on Us" was rated No. 93 in VH1's 100 Greatest One-Hit Wonders because, despite having more hits in the UK, Soul was never again able to reach the top 40 in the US. Soul recorded a new version of the song in 2004, allegedly after being embarrassed when hearing it by chance in an elevator as sung by Owen Wilson in the film version of Starsky and Hutch. The film soundtrack included a cover of the song by Wilson and Neal Casal.

== Charts ==
=== Weekly charts ===
Chart (1976–1977)	Peak position
Australia (Kent Music Report)	1
Belgium (Ultratop 50 Flanders)	4
Belgium (Ultratop 50 Wallonia)	40
Canada RPM Top Singles	1
Canada RPM Adult Contemporary	1
Irish Singles Chart	2
Netherlands (Single Top 100)	3
Netherlands (Dutch Top 40)	3
New Zealand Singles Chart	1
UK Singles Chart	1
US Billboard Hot 100	1
US Billboard Adult Contemporary	1
US Cash Box Top 100	1

=== Year-end charts ===
Chart (1977)	Rank
Australia (Kent Music Report)	11
Canada	20
New Zealand	5
UK	2
US Billboard Hot 100	29
US Billboard Adult Contemporary	22
US Cash Box Top 100	40

=== Decade-end charts ===
Chart (1970–79)	Rank
UK Singles (Official Charts Company)	9

== Cover versions ==
Irish singer Darren Holden covered "Don't Give Up on Us" in 1997, reaching No. 23 in Ireland.

Johnny Mathis recorded a version on his 1977 album “ Hold Me, Thrill Me, Kiss Me”

American soul singer Billy Paul recorded a version for his 1977 album Only the Strong Survive, which was released as a single in the UK the following year.

The song is popular in the Philippines and has been covered by Zsa Zsa Padilla, Kuh Ledesma, Jimmy Bondoc, Marion Aunor, JM de Guzman and Piolo Pascual for the soundtrack of the 2006 film of the same title.

== In popular culture ==
Owen Wilson (playing Hutch, originally Soul's character) sang the song during a scene in the film version of Starsky and Hutch. The song was also used, as well as sung by Rowan Atkinson and Daniel Kaluuya, in the spy comedy film Johnny English Reborn.

== See also ==
- List of 1970s one-hit wonders in the United States
