= David Soul =

American-British actor (1943–2024)

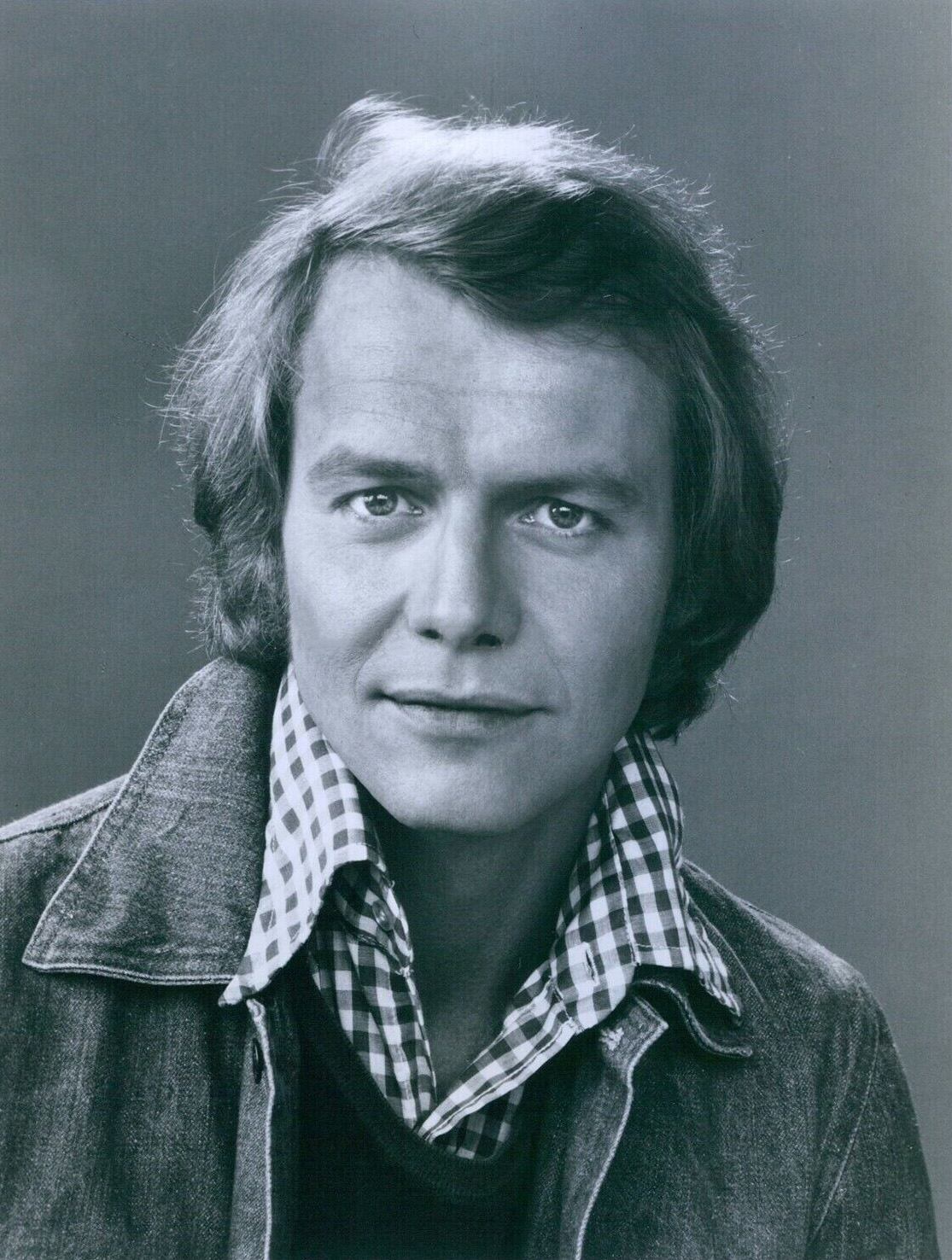
- Soul in 1975
- Born: David Richard Solberg; August 28, 1943; Chicago, Illinois, US
- Died: January 4, 2024 (aged 80); London, England
- Citizenship: United States; United Kingdom
- Occupations: Actor; singer
- Years active: 1961–2014
- Known for: Joshua Bolt – Here Come the Brides; Detective Kenneth Richard "Hutch" Hutchinson – Starsky & Hutch
- Spouses: Mirriam Russeth (m. 1964; div. 1965); Karen Carlson (m. 1968; div. 1977); Patti Carnel Sherman (m. 1980; div. 1986); Julia Nickson (m. 1987; div. 1993); Helen Snell (m. 2010)
- Children: 6, including China Soul
- Website: davidsoul.com

David Soul (born David Richard Solberg; August 28, 1943 – January 4, 2024) was an American-British actor and singer. With a career spanning five decades, he rose to prominence for portraying Detective Kenneth "Hutch" Hutchinson in the American television series Starsky & Hutch from 1975 to 1979. His other notable roles included Joshua Bolt on Here Come the Brides from 1968 to 1970 and as the lead actor in the 1979 American TV movie Salem's Lot. Soul also portrayed Officer John Davis in the 1973 movie Magnum Force.

During his career, Soul also found success as a singer, achieving a number one single on the US Billboard Hot 100 in 1977 with "Don't Give Up on Us", which also peaked at number one in the United Kingdom and Canada. He achieved a further four top 10 entries and an additional number one single on the UK Singles Chart with "Silver Lady". In the 1990s, Soul moved to the UK and found renewed success on the West End stage. He also made cameo appearances in British TV shows, including Little Britain, Holby City, and Lewis.

== Early life ==
Soul was born on August 28, 1943, in Chicago, Illinois, and was of Norwegian descent. His mother, June Joanne (Nelson), was a teacher, and his father, Dr. Richard W. Solberg, was a Lutheran minister, professor of History and Political Science, and director of Higher Education for the Lutheran Church in America (now part of the ELCA). Both of Soul's grandfathers were evangelists. Dr. Solberg was also senior representative for Lutheran World Relief during the reconstruction of Germany after World War II from 1953 until 1956. Because of this, the family moved frequently during Soul's youth, enabling his later learning of Spanish. David's brother Daniel became a Lutheran pastor.

The family was living in Sioux Falls, South Dakota, where Soul's father taught political science and history at Augustana College, when Soul graduated from that city's Washington High School. Soul attended Augustana College for two years before the family moved again, this time to Mexico City, where he studied for one year at the University of the Americas.

While in Mexico, inspired by students who taught him to play the guitar, Soul changed his direction and decided to follow his passion for music. Upon returning from Mexico, he was hired to sing in a club at the University of Minnesota, The 10 O'Clock Scholar.

== Career ==
Soul began performing on stage as an actor in the mid-1960s when he became a founding member of the Firehouse Theater in Minneapolis. He traveled with the company to New York City in 1965, appearing in Bertolt Brecht's Baal and John Arden's Serjeant Musgrave's Dance. Soul first gained national attention as the "Covered Man," appearing on The Merv Griffin Show in 1966 and 1967, on which he sang while wearing a mask. He explained: "My name is David Soul, and I want to be known for my music." The same year, he made his television debut in Flipper.

In 1967, he signed a contract with Columbia Pictures and following a number of guest roles, he landed the role of Joshua Bolt on the television program Here Come the Brides with co-stars Robert Brown, Bobby Sherman, and Bridget Hanley. The series was telecast on the ABC television network from September 25, 1968, to September 18, 1970. In 1972, he co-starred as Arthur Hill's law partner on Owen Marshall, Counselor at Law. Following numerous guest-starring roles on TV, including The Streets of San Francisco, he was cast in the Dirty Harry sequel Magnum Force.

His breakthrough came when he portrayed Detective Ken "Hutch" Hutchinson on Starsky & Hutch, a role he played from 1975 until 1979. Soul also directed three episodes of Starsky & Hutch. During his career he made guest appearances on Star Trek, I Dream of Jeannie, McMillan & Wife, Cannon, Gunsmoke, All in the Family, and numerous TV movies and mini-series, including Homeward Bound (1980) World War III, and Rage (1980). Soul also starred with James Mason in the 1979 TV miniseries adaptation of Stephen King's 'Salem's Lot, which was edited and released as a theatrical feature film in some countries.

During the mid-1970s, Soul returned to his singing roots. He scored one US hit with "Don't Give Up on Us" (1977) which reached No. 1 in the US and the UK. "Silver Lady" (1977) hit No. 1 in the UK. From 1976 to 1982, he toured extensively in the U.S., Europe, Asia, and South America.

In the U.S., he continued to make guest appearances on various television series. He starred in the miniseries The Manions of America as Caleb Staunton in 1981. He starred in the short-lived 1983 NBC series Casablanca, playing nightclub owner Rick Blaine (the role that was made famous by Humphrey Bogart in the 1942 film Casablanca), and co-starred in the NBC series The Yellow Rose during the 1983–1984 season. He also starred in the television adaptation of Ken Follett's wartime drama The Key to Rebecca (1985) directed by David Hemmings. He later starred as the infamous Florida robber Michael Lee Platt in the TV movie In the Line of Duty: The F.B.I. Murders (1988), which depicted the 1986 FBI Miami shootout, subsequently used as an FBI training film. Soul also directed the episode "No Exit" of the 1980s TV series Miami Vice. In 1987, Soul was cast as Major Oldham in the movie The Hanoi Hilton.

In the mid-1990s, Soul moved to the United Kingdom, forging a new career on the West End stage, including the role of Chandler Tate in Comic Potential and The Narrator in Blood Brothers. He also participated in the successful 1997 election campaign of his friend Martin Bell who ran as an MP for Tatton, as well as Bell's unsuccessful campaign in Brentwood in Essex in the 2001 general election.

In 2001 and 2002, he appeared in Holby City as Alan Fletcher.

In 2003, he appeared (as himself) in the first series of the BBC's Little Britain. In 2004, he appeared in Agatha Christie's Poirot – Death on the Nile in the role of Andrew Pennington (he had also starred in the 1989 film adaptation of Christie's Appointment with Death). Soul was a guest on the BBC's Top Gear. He was one of the fastest drivers to have appeared on the show, finishing the lap in 1:54:00, but managed to break the car's gearbox (and subsequently a backup car's) very close to the finish.

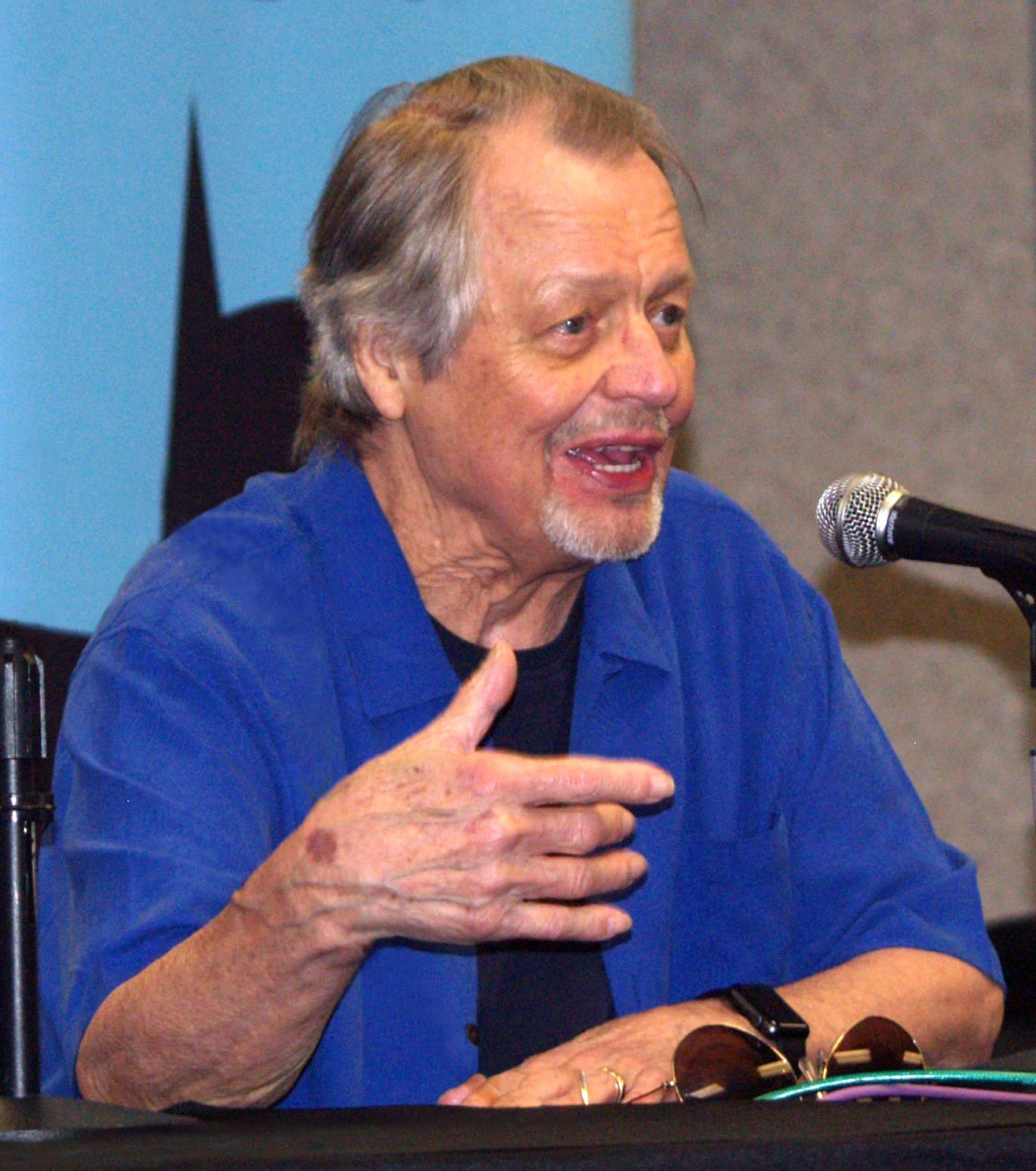
Soul at the 2018 East Coast Comicon in Secaucus, New Jersey

On July 12, 2004, he took over playing the role of Jerry Springer in Jerry Springer: The Opera at the Cambridge Theatre in London, televised by the BBC in 2005. He returned to the West End in 2006, playing Mack in a new production of Jerry Herman's musical Mack and Mabel at the Criterion Theatre. The production co-starred Janie Dee and was directed by John Doyle. He also appeared in the TV series Dalziel & Pascoe ("A Game of Soldiers"). He had a brief cameo in the 2004 movie version of Starsky & Hutch, alongside original co-star Paul Michael Glaser.

In August 2008, Soul appeared in the reality TV talent show-themed television series Maestro on BBC Two mentored by Natalia Luis-Bassa.

He appeared with Fred Ward and Willem Dafoe in the film Farewell directed by Christian Carion, which received its U.S. release in 2010.

In June 2012, Soul made a one-week appearance with Jerry Hall at the Gaiety Theatre, Dublin, in a reprise of the Pulitzer Prize-nominated play by A. R. Gurney, Love Letters. On July 29, 2012, he appeared in an episode of the British television detective drama series Lewis, playing a murder victim. In 2013, Soul appeared in the Scottish film Filth, singing "Silver Lady". In 2014, Soul appeared in a British television commercial for National Express singing "Silver Lady" while driving a coach.

== Personal life ==
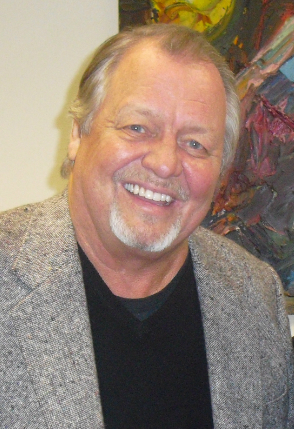
Soul in 2013

Soul was married five times and had five sons and a daughter.

In 1964, Soul married Miriam "Mim" Russeth. The couple had one child before divorcing in 1965.

Soul's second marriage was to actress Karen Carlson. They married in 1968 after they met on the set of the television series Here Come the Brides, in which Carlson had a role. They had a son together, Jon-Kristjian, before they divorced in 1977.

During the years he was filming Starsky & Hutch, Soul had an open relationship with actress Lynne Marta.

In 1980, Soul married Patti Carnel-Sherman, ex-wife of Bobby Sherman. Soul was ordered to attend therapy classes for alcoholism and anger management after attacking her when she was seven months pregnant with his child. Soul was stepfather to Carnel-Sherman's children. The couple divorced in 1986.

A year later, Soul married Singaporean-American actress Julia Nickson. They had a daughter, China Soul, who is a singer-songwriter. Nickson urged Soul to seek help for his excessive drinking, persuading him to enter a rehabilitation facility in 1989.

Soul married his fifth wife, Helen Snell, in 2010. They started a relationship in 2002 while working on the British stage production of Deathtrap.

In 2004, Soul obtained British citizenship.

== Death ==
Soul was a three-pack-a-day cigarette smoker for 50 years. Although he stopped smoking 10 years prior to his death, he was seriously affected by chronic obstructive pulmonary disease (COPD) and also had a lung removed due to cancer. Soul died in London on January 4, 2024, at age 80.

== Filmography ==
=== Film ===
Year	Title	Role	Notes	References
1971	Johnny Got His Gun	Swede	Film debut	
1973	Magnum Force	Officer John Davis		
1975	Dogpound Shuffle	Pritt		
1977	The Stick Up	Duke Turnbeau		
1983	Through Naked Eyes	William Parrish		
1985	The Key to Rebecca	Alex Wolff		
1987	The Hanoi Hilton	Maj Oldham		
1988	Appointment with Death	Jefferson Cope		
1989	Prime Target	Peter Armetage		
1992	Grave Secrets: The Legacy of Hilltop Drive	Sam Haney		
1994	Pentathlon	Mueller		
2004	Starsky & Hutch	The Original Ken "Hutch" Hutchinson	Cameo	
2009	Farewell	Hutton, Ronald Reagan's adviser		
2013	Filth	Punter	Final film role	

=== Television ===
Year	Title	Role	Notes	References
1966	I Dream of Jeannie	Gerhard – the Orderly	1 episode: "My Master, the Weakling"	
1967	Flipper	Ranger Dennis Blake	1 episode	
1967	Star Trek: The Original Series	Makora	Episode: "The Apple"	
1968–1970	Here Come the Brides	Joshua Bolt	52 episodes	
1971	All in the Family	Szabo Daborda	1 episode	
1971–1974	Owen Marshall, Counselor at Law	Pete, Doug, Ted Warrick	7 episodes	
1972	The F.B.I.	Clifford Wade	1 episode: "The Runner"	
1972	The Streets of San Francisco	Jim Martin	1 episode: "Hall of Mirrors"	
1973	Cannon	Sean Cadden, Udo Giesen	2 episodes	
1973	Circle of Fear	James Barlow	1 episode: "The Phantom of Herald Square"	
1974	The Disappearance of Flight 412	Captain Roy Bishop	Television film	
1974	The Rookies	Officer Johnny Dane	Season 3, Episode 11 "Test of Courage"	
1975	Gunsmoke	Ike Hockett	Episode: "Brides and Grooms"	
1975–1979	Starsky & Hutch	Detective Sergeant Kenneth "Hutch" Hutchinson	92 episodes	
1977	Little Ladies of the Night	Lyle York	Television film	
1979	Salem's Lot	Ben Mears	Miniseries	
1980	Rage!	Cal Morrisey	Television film	
1982	World War III	Colonel Jake Caffey	Miniseries	
1983	Casablanca	Rick Blaine	5 episodes	
1983–1984	The Yellow Rose	Roy Champion	22 episodes	
1985	The Key to Rebecca	Alex Wolff	Television film	
1986	The Fifth Missile	Capt. Kevin Harris	Television film	
1988	The Secret of the Sahara	Lieutenant Riker	4 episodes	
1988	In the Line of Duty: The F.B.I. Murders	Mike Lee Platt	Television film	
1989	Unsub	John Westley "Westy" Grayson	8 episodes	
1989	Prime Target	Peter Armetage	Television film	
1990	The Young Riders	Jeremy Styles	"Gathering Clouds", 2 episodes	
1991–1993	Murder, She Wrote	Wes McCorley/Jordan Bartlett	2 episodes	
2001–2002	Holby City	Professor Alan Fletcher	2 episodes	
2003	Little Britain	Himself	1 episode	
2004	Poirot	Andrew Pennington	Episode "Death on the Nile"	
2006	Dalziel and Pascoe	Gus D'Amato	Episode: "A Game of Soldiers"	
2005	Jerry Springer: The Opera	Jerry Springer		
2012	Lewis	Paul Yelland	1 episode	

== Discography ==
=== Albums ===
==== Studio albums ====
Year	Title	Details	AUS	NL	NZ	UK	US
1976	David Soul	Released: November 1976; Label: Private Stock	8	13	17	2	40
1977	Playing to an Audience of One	Released: 1977; Label: Private Stock	30	-	9	8	86
1979	Band of Friends	Released: 1979; Label: Energy	-	-	-	94	163
1982	The Best Days of My Life	Released: 1982; Label: Phillips	-	-	-	-	-
1997	Leave a Light On...	Released: 1997; Label: Self-released	-	-	-	-	-

==== Compilation albums ====
Year	Title	Details	UK
1979	Moods	Released: 1979; Label: K-tel	-
1990	The Best Of...	Released: 1990; Label: Connoisseur Collection; Europe release	-
1993	The Magic Collection	Released: 1993; Label: ARC	-
1994	The Best Of	Released: March 1994; Label: Music Club; UK release of 1990 compilation	-
2008	Looking Back – The Very Best Of	Released: October 2008; Label: Vibrant	-
2010	Don't Give Up on Us – The Very Best of David Soul	Released: November 29, 2010; Label: Music Club Deluxe	-
2020	Gold	Released: March 6, 2020; Label: Crimson	28

=== Singles ===
Year	Single	Chart positions											
Year	Single	AUS	BE (FLA)	BE (WA)	CAN	CAN AC	IRE	NL 40	NL 100	NZ	UK	US	US AC
1966	"The Covered Man" (promo; US-only release)	—	—	—	—	—	—	—	—	—	—	—	—
1966	"Before" (US-only release)	—	—	—	—	—	—	—	—	—	—	—	—
1967	"No One's Gonna Cry (For You Baby)" (promo; US-only release)	—	—	—	—	—	—	—	—	—	—	—	—
1970	"The Train" (US-only release)	—	—	—	—	—	—	—	—	—	—	—	—
1970	"The Road Is Long"	—	—	—	—	—	—	—	—	—	—	—	—
1976	"Don't Give Up on Us"	1	4	40	1	1	2	3	3	1	1	1	1
1977	"Going in with My Eyes Open"	10	12	49	58	14	7	17	13	12	2	54	14
1977	"Silver Lady"	5	12	39	70	36	1	20	16	5	1	52	23
1977	"Let's Have a Quiet Night In"	—	—	—	—	—	5	—	—	—	8	—	—
1978	"It Sure Brings Out the Love in Your Eyes"	—	—	—	—	—	6	—	—	—	12	—	—
1980	"Surrender to Me"	—	—	—	—	—	—	—	—	—	—	—	—
1981	"Fool for Love"	—	—	—	—	—	—	—	—	—	—	—	—
1981	"Dreamers" (Netherlands-only release)	-	20	—	—	—	—	—	41	—	—	—	—
1981	"I Can't Afford That Feeling Anymore" (U.K.and Netherlands-only release)	—	—	—	—	—	—	—	—	—	—	—	—
1982	"How Can You Tell You Got It (If You Don't Ever Give It Away)" (UK-only release)	—	—	—	—	—	—	—	—	—	—	—	—
1985	"Amoureus Sans Bagages" (with Claire Séverac; France and Italy-only release)	—	—	—	—	—	—	—	—	—	—	—	—
1988	"Dream with Me" (with Claire Séverac; France and Italy-only release)	—	—	—	—	—	—	—	—	—	—	—	—
1995	"Smoke with No Fire" (with Claire Séverac; France-only release)	—	—	—	—	—	—	—	—	—	—	—	—

== See also ==
- List of 1970s one-hit wonders in the United States
