= The Very Best Of (Mark Williams album) =

Greatest hits album by Mark Williams
- Released: October 22, 1999
- Recorded: 1974–1990
- Genre: Pop; funk; soul
- Label: EMI Music
- Producer: Alan Galbraith

Mark Williams chronology
Mind Over Matter (1992)	The Very Best Of (1999)	'Live in New Zealand '75' (2016)

The Very Best Of is a greatest hits compilation by New Zealand-born singer Mark Williams. The album was released in 1999. The album includes tracks from four of his studio albums; Mark Williams, Sweet Trials, Taking It All In Stride and Mark Williams ZNZ.

== Track listing ==
CD (5233472)

No.	Title	Writer(s)	Length
1.	"Yesterday Was Just the Beginning of My Life"	Vanda & Young	3:48
2.	"Sweet Wine"	Reece Kirk	3:18
3.	"If It Rains"	Kiki Dee	3:12
4.	"A House for Sale"	Carl Hampton, Homer Banks	4:04
5.	"It Doesn't Matter Anymore"	Paul Anka	2:44
6.	"Why Can't We Be Lovers"	Holland-Dozier-Holland	3:29
7.	"Love is Forever"	Tim Martin, Walt Meskell	2:59
8.	"This is the Life"	Geoff Murphy, Ian Watkin	3:50
9.	"If There's Still a Little Love" (with Sharon O'Neill)	Alan Hawkshaw, John Rostill	3:52
10.	"Rock'n'Roll Widow"	Tom Snow	5:03
11.	"True Love (Is Never Easy)"	Malcolm McCallum	5:18
12.	"Wonder of Wonders"	David Kahne	4:04
13.	"Taking It All in Stride"	Tom Snow	4:28
14.	"Celebration"	Ashton, Lord	3:35
15.	"Ain't No Sunshine"	Bill Withers	2:30
16.	"Love the One You're With"	Stephen Stills	3:36
17.	"Gimme a Little Sign"	Alfred Smith, Joe Hooven, Jerry Winn	2:40
18.	"No Matter How Hard You Try"	Clinton Brown, Keith Norris, Kevin Bayley, Wayne Mason	4:01
19.	"Show No Mercy"	Vanda & Young	4:25
