= Greatest Hits (Mark Williams album) =

Greatest hits album by Mark Williams
- Released: late 1977
- Recorded: 1974–1977
- Studio: EMI Studios, Wellington, New Zealand
- Genre: Pop; funk; soul
- Label: EMI Music
- Producer: Alan Galbraith

Mark Williams chronology
Taking It All In Stride (1977)	Greatest Hits (1977)	Life After Dark (1979)

Greatest Hits is the first greatest hits album released by New Zealand-born singer Mark Williams, released in late 1977 following the expiry of his contract with EMI Music. It includes tracks from his three studio albums to date; Mark Williams, Sweet Trials and Taking It All In Stride.

== Track listing ==
LP/Cassette (HSD 1064)

Side A
No.	Title	Writer(s)	Length
1.	"It Doesn't Matter Anymore"	Paul Anka	2:42
2.	"Celebration"	Ashton, Lord	3:32
3.	"If There's Still a Little Love" (with Sharon O'Neill)	Alan Hawkshaw, John Rostill	3:55
4.	"Ain't No Sunshine"	Bill Withers	2:20
5.	"This is the Life"	Geoff Murphy, Ian Watkin	3:50
6.	"Taking It All in Stride"	Tom Snow	4:23

Side B
No.	Title	Writer(s)	Length
1.	"Yesterday Was Just the Beginning of My Life"	Vanda & Young	3:54
2.	"If It Rains"	Kiki Dee	3:10
3.	"Love the One You're With"	Stephen Stills	3:30
4.	"Sweet Wine"	Reece Kirk	3:13
5.	"Gimme a Little Sign"	Alfred Smith, Joe Hooven, Jerry Winn	2:40
6.	"A House for Sale"	Carl Hampton, Homer Banks	4:02
