= New Zealand top 50 singles of 1977 =

This is a list of the top 50 singles of 1977 in New Zealand.

== Chart ==
Key
‡ – Single of New Zealand origin

Number	Artist	Single
1	Heatwave	"Boogie Nights"
2	Pussycat	"My Broken Souvenirs"
3	Kenny Rogers	"Lucille"
4	Julie Covington	"Don't Cry for Me Argentina"
5	David Soul	"Don't Give Up on Us"
6	Mark Williams	"It Doesn't Matter Anymore"
7	JJ Cale	"Cocaine"
8	Electric Light Orchestra	"Telephone Line"
9	Andy Gibb	"I Just Want to Be Your Everything"
10	Engelbert Humperdinck	"After the Lovin'"
11	Tom Jones	"Say You'll Stay Until Tomorrow"
12	Rod Stewart	"I Don't Want to Talk About It"
13	The Floaters	"Float On"
14	Barbra Streisand	"Evergreen (Love Theme from A Star Is Born)"
15	Rose Royce	"Car Wash"
16	Leo Sayer	"When I Need You"
17	Peter McCann	"Do You Wanna Make Love"
18	Michael Nesmith	"Rio"
19	Paul Nicholas	"Heaven On The 7th Floor"
20	Donna Summer	"I Feel Love"
21	Boney M.	"Ma Baker"
22	Rita Coolidge	"(Your Love Has Lifted Me) Higher and Higher"
23	Alan O'Day	"Undercover Angel"
24	Hot	"Angel in Your Arms"
25	Tavares	"Whodunit"
26	Elvis Presley	"Moody Blue"
27	Leo Sayer	"You Make Me Feel Like Dancing"
28	David Bowie	"Sound and Vision"
29	David Soul	"Silver Lady"
30	Eagles	"Hotel California"
31	The Muppets	"Mahna, Mahna"
32	Rod Stewart	"You're in My Heart (The Final Acclaim)"
33	Hot Chocolate	"So You Win Again"
34	Ram Jam	"Black Betty"
35	Commodores	"Brick House"
36	Racing Cars	"They Shoot Horses, Don't They"
37	Marilyn McCoo & Billy Davis, Jr.	"You Don't Have to Be a Star (To Be in My Show)"
38	Commodores	"Easy"
39	Elvis Presley	"Way Down"
40	Toni Williams	"The One I Sing My Love Songs To"
41	ABBA	"Rock Me"
42	Hello Sailor	"Gutter Black"
43	The Emotions	"Best of My Love"
44	Rose Royce	"I Wanna Get Next to You"
45	Elkie Brooks	"Pearl's a Singer"
46	Mary MacGregor	"Torn Between Two Lovers"
47	The Brothers Johnson	"Strawberry Letter 23"
48	Leo Sayer	"How Much Love"
49	Phoebe Snow	"Shakey Ground"
50	Wild Cherry	"Hot To Trot"

== Chart by numbers ==
=== Origin ===
==== By artist ====
The following shows the country of origin from where the artist (including any featured artist where applicable) originate from. Artists who appear more than once have only been tallied once.

Country	Total
United States	24
England	11
New Zealand	3
Australia	1
Netherlands	1
Sweden	1
Germany	1

Notes
- Boney M. are regarded as German for this tally, although members are from the Caribbean.
- Andy Gibb was born in England and has been tallied as England, although his brothers (Bee Gees) and parents were from Australia.

==== By single ====
The following shows the country of origin from which the singles originate regardless of who the artist is.

Country	Total
United States	28
England	14
New Zealand	3
Netherlands	1
Sweden	1
Germany	1
Australia	1

=== Most singles ===
Shows the artists with the most singles to appear in this chart.

Artist	Total
Leo Sayer	3
Rod Stewart	2
David Soul	2
Elvis Presley	2
Commodores	2
Rose Royce	2

=== Format ===
The following shows where each single appears on, whether it was the artists album, a non-album single, an extended play or as part of a soundtrack.

Format	Total
Albums	47
non-album singles	2
Soundtracks	1

Notes
- The song "Don't Cry for Me Argentina" by Julie Covington was from the concept album Evita and is counted as an album.
- The song "Evergreen (Love Theme from A Star Is Born)" by Barbra Streisand is from the soundtrack A Star Is Born.
- The song "Mahna Mahna" by The Muppets is considered a non-album single in this period, later appearing on The Muppet Show album.

=== Multiple releases ===
The following shows singles that had multiple releases from the same album.

Title	Total	Singles
Endless Flight (Leo Sayer)	3	When I Need You; You Make Me Feel Like Dancing; How Much Love
David Soul (David Soul)	2	Don't Give Up on Us; Silver Lady
Commodores (Commodores)	2	Brick House; Easy
Moody Blue (Elvis Presley)	2	Moody Blue; Way Down
Rose Royce II: In Full Bloom (Rose Royce)	2	Car Wash; I Wanna Get Next to You
A Night on the Town (Rod Stewart)	2	I Don't Want to Talk About It; You're in My Heart (The Final Acclaim)

=== Type ===
The following shows the denomination that each single was released as, whether as a solo artist or as part of a group, band or duo.

Type	Total
Solo artists	30
Groups	16
Duos	2
Collaborations	1

Notes
- Marilyn McCoo & Billy Davis Jr. have been regarded as a duo.

=== Top Genre ===
The following shows the most common genres the Top 50 singles are regarded as (as per their genre descriptions in the singles entries. Where a genre was not noted, the genre of the album was used instead. Subgenres have been split as their own entry.

Genre	Total	Singles
Disco	11	Boogie Nights (Heatwave); Car Wash (Rose Royce); I Feel Love (Donna Summer); Ma Baker (Boney M.); Float On (The Floaters); Brick House (Commodores); Best of My Love (The Emotions); I Wanna Get Next to You (Rose Royce); Strawberry Letter 23 (The Brothers Johnson); I Just Want to Be Your Everything (Andy Gibb); You Make Me Feel Like Dancing (Leo Sayer)
Soft rock	10	Don't Give Up on Us (David Soul); It Doesn't Matter Anymore (Mark Williams)‡ Telephone Line (Electric Light Orchestra); After the Lovin'' ' (Engelbert Humperdinck); Hotel California (Eagles); Evergreen (Love Theme from A Star Is Born) (Barbra Streisand); When I Need You (Leo Sayer); How Much Love (Leo Sayer); Torn Between Two Lovers (Mary MacGregor); The One I Sing My Love Songs To (Toni Williams)‡
Pop	9	My Broken Souvenirs (Pussycat); Don't Cry for Me Argentina (Julie Covington); It Doesn't Matter Anymore (Mark Williams)‡ Telephone Line (Electric Light Orchestra); After the Lovin'' ' (Engelbert Humperdinck); Heaven on the 7th Floor (Paul Nicholas); Rock Me (ABBA); Gutter Black (Hello Sailor)‡ Pearl's a Singer (Elkie Brooks)
Country	5	Lucille (Kenny Rogers); Say You'll Stay Until Tomorrow (Tom Jones); My Broken Souvenirs (Pussycat); Put Another Log on the Fire (Mary MacGregor); Moody Blue (Elvis Presley)
Soul	4	Float On (The Floaters); Car Wash (Rose Royce); Best of My Love (The Emotions); You Don't Have to Be a Star (To Be in My Show) (Marilyn McCoo & Billy Davis Jr.)
R&B	3	Float On (The Floaters); Brick House (Commodores); Easy (Commodores)
Funk	3	Brick House (Commodores); Strawberry Letter 23 (The Brothers Johnson); Hot to Trot (Wild Cherry)
Rock	3	Telephone Line (Electric Light Orchestra); Hotel California (Eagles); They Shoot Horses, Don't They (Racing Cars)

=== Top Labels ===
The following shows the most common record labels that a single was associated with. Any label that only had one single has not been noted.

Label	Total	Singles
Warner Bros. Records	5	You Make Me Feel Like Dancing (Leo Sayer); When I Need You (Leo Sayer); How Much Love (Leo Sayer); Hotel California (Eagles); Strawberry Letter 23 (The Brothers Johnson)
EMI	4	My Broken Souvenirs (Pussycat); It Doesn't Matter Anymore (Mark Williams)‡ Gutter Black (Hello Sailor)‡ Pearl's a Singer (Elkie Brooks)
RSO Records	3	I Just Want to Be Your Everything (Andy Gibb); Boogie Nights (Heatwave – US); How Deep Is Your Love
Private Stock Records	2	Don't Give Up on Us (David Soul); Silver Lady (David Soul)
RCA Records	2	Moody Blue (Elvis Presley); Way Down (Elvis Presley)
Motown	2	Brick House (Commodores); Easy (Commodores)

=== Top songwriters ===
The following shows the songwriters who had the most top-selling singles of 1977 in New Zealand.

Writer	Total	Singles
Barry Gibb	2	I Just Want to Be Your Everything (Andy Gibb); How Deep Is Your Love Leo Sayer
Leo Sayer	3	When I Need You (Leo Sayer) (co-writer Albert Hammond); You Make Me Feel Like Dancing (Leo Sayer); How Much Love (Leo Sayer)

=== Most/Least songwriters ===
The following shows the singles that were credited as having been written by only one person and the singles that had the most credited writers of 1977.

Single	Total	Songwriter/s
"Boogie Nights" (Heatwave)	1	Rod Temperton
"My Broken Souvenirs" (Pussycat)	1	Werner Theunissen
"Lucille" (Kenny Rogers)	2	Roger Bowling; Hal Bynum
"Cocaine" (JJ Cale)	1	JJ Cale
"Don't Cry for Me Argentina" (Julie Covington)	2	Andrew Lloyd Webber; Tim Rice

=== Top producers ===
The following shows the producers who had the most singles to appear on this chart.

Producer	Total	Singles
Tony Macaulay	2	Don't Give Up on Us (David Soul); Silver Lady (David Soul)
