= New Zealand top 40 singles of 1975 =

This is a list of the top 40 singles of 1975 in New Zealand. In 1975, the New Zealand singles chart was based on sales alone. RIANZ began producing the Official Singles Chart on 2 May 1975. The year-end chart includes sales from this date, onward.

== Chart ==
Key
‡ – Single of New Zealand origin

Number	Artist	Single
1	Freddy Fender	"Before The Next Teardrop Falls"
2	Freddy Fender	"Wasted Days and Wasted Nights"
3	Bob Hudson	"The Newcastle Song"
4	George Baker Selection	"Paloma Blanca"
5	Frankie Valli	"My Eyes Adored You"
6	ABBA	"I Do, I Do, I Do, I Do, I Do"
7	Roger Whittaker	"The Last Farewell"
8	Mark Williams	"Yesterday Was Just the Beginning of My Life"^{‡}
9	Glen Campbell	"Rhinestone Cowboy
10	Sammy Johns	"Chevy Van"
11	B.J. Thomas	"(Hey Won't You Play) Another Somebody Done Somebody Wrong Song"
12	Sweet	"Fox On The Run"
13	Bad Company	"Feel Like Makin' Love"
14	The Elton John Band	"Philadelphia Freedom"
15	Eagles	"One Of These Nights"
16	Kraftwerk	"Autobahn"
17	Johnny Nash	"Tears On My Pillow"
18	Helen Reddy	"Free & Easy"
19	Van McCoy	"The Hustle"
20	Bee Gees	"Jive Talkin'"
21	Jim Gilstrap	"Swing Your Daddy"
22	Captain & Tennille	"Love Will Keep Us Together"
23	Rod Stewart	"Sailing"
24	Typically Tropical	"Barbados"
25	Wings	"Listen To What The Man Said"
26	Shirley & Company	"Shame, Shame, Shame"
27	Elton John	"Someone Saved My Life Tonight"
28	Ray Stevens	"Misty"
29	John Lennon	"Stand By Me"
30	10cc	"I'm Not In Love"
31	Redbone	"Suzi Girl"
32	Tony Angel	"3 Bells"
33	Carpenters	"Only Yesterday"
34	Carpenters	"Please Mr. Postman"
35	Billie Jo Spears	"Blanket On The Ground"
36	The Tymes	"Ms Grace"
37	Ozark Mountain Daredevils	"Jackie Blue"
38	Jim Gilstrap	"Take Your Daddy For A Ride"
39	Carol Douglas	"Doctor's Orders"
40	Splinter	"Costafine Town"

== Chart by numbers ==
=== Origin ===
==== By artist ====
The following shows the country of origin from where the artist (including any featured artist where applicable) originate from. Artists who appear more than once have only been tallied once.

Country	Total
United States	19
England	12
Australia	3
New Zealand	1
Sweden	1
Netherlands	1
Germany	1

Notes
- Roger Whittaker was born in Nairobi, Kenya but is regarded as British and has been tallied as England.
- Helen Reddy was Australian-American but has been tallied as Australia for her origin.
- Bee Gees are regarded as a British-Australian group formed in Australia and as such both countries have been included in their tally.
- Wings have been regarded as a British band for this tally.
- Tony Angel was a British pop vocalist on Pye Records and has been tallied as England.

==== By single ====
The following shows the country of origin from which the singles originate regardless of who the artist is.

Country	Total
United States	22
England	13
Australia	3
New Zealand	1
Sweden	1
Netherlands	1
Germany	1

Notes
- Bee Gees have been included in both Australia and England tallies.

=== Most singles ===
Shows the artists with the most singles to appear in this chart.

Artist	Total
Freddy Fender	2
Carpenters	2
Jim Gilstrap	2
Elton John	2

=== Format ===
The following shows where each single appears on, whether it was the artists album, a non-album single, an extended play or as part of a soundtrack.

Format	Total
Albums	39
non-album singles	1

Notes
- The song "Philadelphia Freedom" by Elton John Band was a non-album single at the time. Although listed as from Captain Fantastic and the Brown Dirt Cowboy, it did not appear on the album and made its album debut on Elton John's Greatest Hits Volume II.

=== Multiple releases ===
The following shows singles that had multiple releases from the same album.

Title	Total	Singles
Before the Next Teardrop Falls (Freddy Fender)	2	Before The Next Teardrop Falls; Wasted Days and Wasted Nights
Horizon (Carpenters)	2	Only Yesterday; Please Mr. Postman
Swing Your Daddy (Jim Gilstrap)	2	Swing Your Daddy; Take Your Daddy for a Ride
Captain Fantastic and the Brown Dirt Cowboy (Elton John)	2	Philadelphia Freedom (Elton John Band); Someone Saved My Life Tonight

=== Type ===
The following shows the denomination that each single was released as, whether as a solo artist or as part of a group, band or duo.

Type	Total
Solo artists	23
Groups	13
Duos	4

=== Top Genre ===
The following shows the most common genres the Top 40 singles are regarded as (as per their genre descriptions in the singles entries. Where a genre was not noted, the genre of the album/artist was used instead. Subgenres have been split as their own entry.

Genre	Total	Singles
Pop	9	Paloma Blanca (George Baker Selection); The Last Farewell (Roger Whittaker); Yesterday Was Just the Beginning of My Life (Mark Williams)‡ Chevy Van (Sammy Johns); Barbados (Typically Tropical); Listen to What the Man Said (Wings); Please Mr. Postman (Carpenters); 3 Bells / The Three Bells (Tony Angel); Costafine Town (Splinter)
Country	7	Before The Next Teardrop Falls (Freddy Fender); Wasted Days and Wasted Nights (Freddy Fender); The Newcastle Song (Bob Hudson); Rhinestone Cowboy (Glen Campbell) (Hey Won't You Play) Another Somebody Done Somebody Wrong Song (B.J. Thomas); Misty (Ray Stevens); Blanket on the Ground (Billie Jo Spears)
Soul	6	Tears On My Pillow (Johnny Nash); Free & Easy (Helen Reddy); Swing Your Daddy (Jim Gilstrap); Shame, Shame, Shame (Shirley & Company); Doctor's Orders (Carol Douglas); Ms Grace (The Tymes)
Disco	6	Philadelphia Freedom (Elton John Band); One Of These Nights (Eagles); The Hustle (Van McCoy); Jive Talkin' (Bee Gees); Listen to What the Man Said (Wings); Shame, Shame, Shame (Shirley & Company)
Soft rock	5	My Eyes Adored You (Frankie Valli); Feel Like Makin' Love (Bad Company); Sailing (Rod Stewart); Someone Saved My Life Tonight (Elton John); I'm Not in Love (10cc)
Rock	4	One Of These Nights (Eagles); Stand By Me (John Lennon); Costafine Town (Splinter); Jackie Blue (Ozark Mountain Daredevils)
R&B	3	One Of These Nights (Eagles); Jive Talkin'' ' (Bee Gees); Doctor's Orders (Carol Douglas)
Folk rock	3	Chevy Van (Sammy Johns); One Of These Nights (Eagles); Costafine Town (Splinter)
Glam rock	1	Fox On The Run (Sweet)
Hard rock	2	Fox On The Run (Sweet); Feel Like Makin' Love (Bad Company)
Country rock	3	One Of These Nights (Eagles); Jackie Blue (Ozark Mountain Daredevils); Chevy Van (Sammy Johns)
Schlager	2	Paloma Blanca (George Baker Selection); I Do, I Do, I Do, I Do, I Do (ABBA)
Pop rock	2	I Do, I Do, I Do, I Do, I Do (ABBA); Free & Easy (Helen Reddy)
Funk	2	Yesterday Was Just the Beginning of My Life (Mark Williams); Jive Talkin' (Bee Gees)
Electronic	2	Autobahn (Kraftwerk); The Hustle (Van McCoy)
Yacht rock	1	Listen to What the Man Said (Wings)

=== Top Labels ===
The following shows the most common record labels that a single was associated with. Any label that only had one single has not been noted.

Label	Total	Singles
A&M Records	4	Only Yesterday (Carpenters); Please Mr. Postman (Carpenters); Jackie Blue (Ozark Mountain Daredevils); Costafine Town (Splinter)
Capitol Records	3	Rhinestone Cowboy (Glen Campbell); Free & Easy (Helen Reddy); Listen to What the Man Said (Wings)
RCA Records	3	The Last Farewell (Roger Whittaker); Fox On The Run (Sweet); Ms Grace (The Tymes)
ABC Records	2	Before The Next Teardrop Falls (Freddy Fender) (Hey Won't You Play) Another Somebody Done Somebody Wrong Song (B.J. Thomas)
MCA Records	2	Philadelphia Freedom (Elton John Band); Someone Saved My Life Tonight (Elton John)
Roxbury Records	2	Swing Your Daddy (Jim Gilstrap); Take Your Daddy for a Ride (Jim Gilstrap)

=== Top songwriters ===
The following shows the songwriters who had the most top-selling singles of 1975 in New Zealand.

Writer	Total	Singles
Kenny Nolan	3	Chevy Van (Sammy Johns); Swing Your Daddy (Jim Gilstrap); Take Your Daddy for a Ride (Jim Gilstrap)
Elton John	2	Philadelphia Freedom (Elton John Band); Someone Saved My Life Tonight (Elton John)
Bernie Taupin	2	Philadelphia Freedom (Elton John Band); Someone Saved My Life Tonight (Elton John)
Richard Carpenter	2	Only Yesterday (Carpenters); Please Mr. Postman (as arranger, original writers credited)

=== Most/Least songwriters ===
The following shows the singles that were credited as having been written by only one person and the singles that had the most credited writers of 1975.

Single	Total	Songwriter/s
"The Newcastle Song" (Bob Hudson)	1	Bob Hudson
"Chevy Van" (Sammy Johns)	1	Sammy Johns
"Rhinestone Cowboy" (Glen Campbell)	1	Larry Weiss
"The Hustle" (Van McCoy)	1	Van McCoy
"Shame, Shame, Shame" (Shirley & Company)	1	Sylvia Robinson
"Blanket on the Ground" (Billie Jo Spears)	1	Roger Bowling
"Please Mr. Postman" (Carpenters)	5	Georgia Dobbins; William Garrett; Freddie Gorman; Brian Holland; Robert Bateman

=== Top producers ===
The following shows the producers who had the most singles to appear on this chart.

Producer	Total	Singles
Kenny Nolan	2	Swing Your Daddy (Jim Gilstrap); Take Your Daddy for a Ride (Jim Gilstrap)
Richard Carpenter	2	Only Yesterday (Carpenters); Please Mr. Postman (Carpenters)
Gus Dudgeon	2	Philadelphia Freedom (Elton John Band); Someone Saved My Life Tonight (Elton John)
Huey P. Meaux	2	Before The Next Teardrop Falls (Freddy Fender); Wasted Days and Wasted Nights (Freddy Fender)
