= How Much Love =

How Much Love may refer to:

- "How Much Love" (Leo Sayer song), a 1977 song by Leo Sayer
- "How Much Love" (Survivor song), a 1987 song by Survivor
- "How Much Love", a song by Vixen from the album Rev It Up
