= Life After Dark =

Studio album by Mark Williams
- Released: 1979
- Recorded: 1978–79
- Studio: Trafalgar Studios, Sydney, Australia
- Genre: Pop; funk; soul
- Label: CBS Records
- Producer: Alan Galbraith

Mark Williams chronology
Greatest Hits (1977)	Life After Dark (1979)	Mark Williams ZNZ (1990)

Singles from Life After Dark
- 1. "Wanna Give You My Love" Released: 1978; 2. "I Don't Want You Anymore" Released: October 1979; 3. "Throw Me a Line" Released: January 1980

Life After Dark is the fourth studio album by New Zealand-born singer Mark Williams. The album was his first on the CBS Records label and released in 1979.

== Track listing ==
LP/Cassette (SBP 237330)

Side A
No.	Title	Writer(s)	Length
1.	"Let Me In"	Mark Williams
2.	"Groove Line"	R. Temperton
3.	"How Long"	Z. Grey, R. Hanks
4.	"You Took the Money"	M. Williams
5.	"Wanna Give You My Love"	Adrian Scott

Side B
No.	Title	Writer(s)	Length
1.	"I Don't Want You Anymore"	B. Champlin, D. Foster
2.	"Now That You've Gone"	M. Williams
3.	"Your Mamma Won't Mind"	B. Thorp, R. Patton
4.	"Throw Me a Line"	M. Williams
5.	"Why Don't You Write"	M. Williams, M. Logan

== Personnel ==
- Mark Williams - lead vocal
- Cos Russo - keyboard
- Mark Punch - guitar, backing vocal
- Phil Lawson - bass
- Peter Figures - drums
- Adrian Scott - keyboards
- Brenton White - guitar
- John Kemp - guitar
- Brian Hamilton - bass
- Jackie Orszaczky - bass
- Perry Johnston - drums
- Sunil da Silva - percussion
- Joe Tattersal - percussion
- Boof Thompson- trumpet
- Keith Stirling - trumpet
- Geoff Oakes - saxophone
- Alan Galbraith - backing vocal
- Sheryl Black - backing vocal
- Maggie McKinney - backing vocal
- Shauna Jensen - backing vocal
- Mary Bradfield - backing vocal
- Ron Barry - backing vocal
