= List of number-one singles in 1975 (New Zealand) =

This is a list of Number 1 hit singles in 1975 in New Zealand, starting with the first chart dated, 17 January 1975.

== Chart ==
Key
‡ – Single of New Zealand origin

Week	Artist	Title
3 January 1975	Summer break - no chart	Summer break - no chart
10 January 1975	Summer break - no chart	Summer break - no chart
17 January 1975	John Hanlon	"Lovely Lady"^{‡}
24 January 1975	John Hanlon	"Lovely Lady"^{‡}
31 January 1975	John Hanlon	"Lovely Lady"^{‡}
7 February 1975	Billy Swan	"I Can Help"
14 February 1975	Billy Swan	"I Can Help"
21 February 1975	Billy Swan	"I Can Help"
28 February 1975	Billy Swan	"I Can Help"
7 March 1975	The Carpenters	"Please Mr. Postman"
14 March 1975	The Carpenters	"Please Mr. Postman"
21 March 1975	The Carpenters	"Please Mr. Postman"
28 March 1975	David Bowie	"Young Americans"
4 April 1975	David Bowie	"Young Americans"
11 April 1975	Helen Reddy	"Free & Easy"
18 April 1975	Helen Reddy	"Free & Easy"
25 April 1975	Helen Reddy	"Free & Easy"
2 May 1975	Helen Reddy	"Free & Easy"
9 May 1975	Frankie Valli	"My Eyes Adored You"
16 May 1975	Frankie Valli	"My Eyes Adored You"
23 May 1975	Frankie Valli	"My Eyes Adored You"
30 May 1975	Frankie Valli	"My Eyes Adored You"
6 June 1975	Bob Hudson	"The Newcastle Song"
13 June 1975	Bob Hudson	"The Newcastle Song"
20 June 1975	Bob Hudson	"The Newcastle Song"
27 June 1975	Mark Williams	"Yesterday Was Just the Beginning of My Life"^{‡}
4 July 1975	Bob Hudson	"The Newcastle Song"
11 July 1975	Mark Williams	"Yesterday Was Just the Beginning of My Life"^{‡}
18 July 1975	Mark Williams	"Yesterday Was Just the Beginning of My Life"^{‡}
25 July 1975	Bob Hudson	"The Newcastle Song"
1 August 1975	George Baker Selection	"Paloma Blanca"
8 August 1975	Bob Hudson	"The Newcastle Song"
15 August 1975	George Baker Selection	"Paloma Blanca"
22 August 1975	George Baker Selection	"Paloma Blanca"
29 August 1975	ABBA	"I Do, I Do, I Do, I Do, I Do"
5 September 1975	George Baker Selection	"Paloma Blanca"
12 September 1975	George Baker Selection	"Paloma Blanca"
19 September 1975	Freddy Fender	"Wasted Days & Wasted Nights"
26 September 1975	Freddy Fender	"Wasted Days & Wasted Nights"
3 October 1975	Freddy Fender	"Wasted Days & Wasted Nights"
10 October 1975	Freddy Fender	"Wasted Days & Wasted Nights"
17 October 1975	Freddy Fender	"Wasted Days & Wasted Nights"
24 October 1975	Freddy Fender	"Wasted Days & Wasted Nights"
31 October 1975	Freddy Fender	"Wasted Days & Wasted Nights"
7 November 1975	Freddy Fender	"Wasted Days & Wasted Nights"
14 November 1975	Freddy Fender	"Wasted Days & Wasted Nights"
21 November 1975	Johnny Nash	"Tears On My Pillow"
28 November 1975	Johnny Nash	"Tears On My Pillow"
5 December 1975	Freddy Fender	"Wasted Days and Wasted Nights"
12 December 1975	Freddy Fender	"Wasted Days and Wasted Nights"
19 December 1975	Freddy Fender	"Wasted Days and Wasted Nights"
26 December 1975	Summer break - no chart	Summer break - no chart

== Notes ==
- Number of number-one singles: 8
- Longest run at number-one: "Wasted Days and Wasted Nights" by Freddy Fender (12 weeks).

== See also ==
- 1975 in music
- RIANZ
