= Lionel Petersen =

South African singer (1947–2022)

- Born: 13 October 1947; Alexandra, Transvaal, South Africa
- Died: 14 July 2022 (aged 74)
- Genres: Soul music, popular music, devotional
- Occupations: Singer, preacher
- Labels: Plum Records, Decca, RCA Victor, Gallo, Bullet, Harmony Records

Lionel Petersen was a South African singer who had at least seven top 20 chart hits in South Africa during the 1970s.

== Background ==
Petersen was born in the Alexandra Township in South Africa. He fronted a group called the Thunderballs which was described as a very dynamic group. Some time later, having relocated to Cape Town, he sent time in a group called The Rockets.

In the late 1960s, Petersen was a singer in The Invaders a South African group.

As a solo artist, the hits he had include, "I Need a Little Love", "That’s the Way", "Private Number" and "Bouncy Bouncy Bounce".

== Career ==
=== 1970s - 1980s ===
In 1975, Petersen's I'll Take You Where the Music's Playing album was released. It included the songs, "Bouncy Bouncy Bounce", "Swing Your Daddy", "Girls", "Dolly My Love", "That's The Way I Like It", "I'll Take You Where the Music's Playing", "It's Been So Long", "Star on a T.V. Show", "Young Gifted and Black", "Hang On In There Baby. "Bouncy Bouncy Bounce" was a chart hit in South Africa. It debuted at no. 16 on 28 November. On 2 January 1976 it peaked at no. 9 and held the position for another week.

Petersen had two hits in 1976. He recorded "That's the Way" which entered the South African chart on 2 July and peaked at No. 9 during its fifteen-week run. And he recorded "I'll Keep on Coming Back" which entered the chart on 10 December and spent eight weeks on the South African chart and peaked at No. 9.

=== Later years ===
Having become a Christian, Petersen recorded the Rejoice Africa album which was released on CD Hosanna! Music 050. The album which was recorded live in Johannesberg with 5,000 worshippers in the audience was reviewed by Tony Cummings of Cross Rhythms in October 1993. Petersen was the worship leader. Cummings said he was an excellent singer and an enthusiastic exhorter and gave a very good recommendation for the album. It was also noted in the World Christian magazine.

Working with producers Sibusiso Victor Masondo and Victor Arthur, Petersen recorded his Day by Day album which was released on Harmony Records 1729. It was reviewed in the 22 May 1999 issue of Billboard. It was a highly positive review with Petersen's vocal skills being praised and Masondo's production of the material which included gospel, AC, and R&B being referred to as impeccable. The reviewer finished off with calling the album, "An undeniably divine offering from start to finish".

It was reported by Modern Ghana on 29 November 2012 that Petersen had arrived in Ghana for the "Let Peace Rain" concert. The concert which was taking place at the Dome of the Accra International Conference Center was set to take place on 1 December. Sonnie Badu was also booked to appear. This was Petersen's second visit to the country.

== Death ==
Petersen died in 2022.
