= Fornicon =

Fornicon is a 1995 Dance Work choreographed by Graeme Murphy with music by Martin Armiger. Murphy plays The Author, Janet Vernon plays Helene and the singer named The Don is played by Mark Williams. It was initially inspired by Tomi Ungerers book of the same name. Produced by the Sydney Dance Company it toured Australia, opening at the Sydney Opera house on 6 May and playing until 22 July 1995.

Murphy calls it a pornographic work, a reaction to the suppression bought about in the reaction to AIDS. Ken Healy of the Sydney Morning Herald wrote "It could be said to slide astride the razor blade of dance with the toes of one leg licked by the tongue of erotica, while the oiled length of the other limb is stroked by the fingers of soft porn." In the same masthead Jill Sykes said "And that sense of wanting more is a good way to sum up Fornicon: so much fun that you don't want it to stop and the feeling that a return visit would provide even more to admire and enjoy as you get to know the subject better." Robin Grove in the Age said "But the very audiences Murphy has brought into being could rise to more, far more. So could the dancers of SDC, starting with Murphy himself and the phenomenal Janet Vernon. What a work could have resulted, had tired ideas like the Don as a pop star been replaced by full-on choreography, to realise the genuine subversiveness of these (anti-)Enlightenment stories."

A soundtrack album was released and was nominated for the ARIA Music Award for Best Original Soundtrack / Cast / Show Recording in 1995.
