= Home and Away (song) =

Single by Karen Boddington and Mark Williams
- Released: 28 August 1989
- Studio: Albert Studios in Sydney
- Genre: Pop; theme
- Length: 3:30
- Label: First Night Records
- Songwriter: Mike Perjanik
- Producer: Mike Perjanik

Karen Boddington and Mark Williams singles chronology
"K.1.W.1." (1988)	"Home and Away" (1989)	"Show No Mercy" (1990)

"Home and Away" is the theme song to the Australian soap opera, Home and Away. It was composed by Mike Perjanik and originally performed by Karen Boddington and Mark Williams. Their version was released as a single in 1989 and peaked at number 73 on the UK Singles Chart. There have been nine different recorded versions of the theme song used over the years, including two recorded by Australian sibling trio The Robertson Brothers. From 2010 until 2017, the Home and Away theme song was not used in the show's opening titles and was replaced by a short instrumental version. However, in 2018, two new eight-second versions of the theme song made a return to the opening titles after an eight-year absence and in 2025, the theme song returned to being a minute long, although the minute long version only plays on Thursdays, with the other days having the eight second version.

== Background ==
"Home and Away" was written, produced and arranged by Mike Perjanik as the theme song to Home and Away. It was originally performed by Karen Boddington and Mark Williams. The song was engineered by Wahanui Wynyard and recorded at Albert Studios in Sydney. In an interview with music website Noisey, Perjanik said he was only given a rough idea that the show was going to be about foster kids, being home or away, "so I decided that I wanted the mood to be warm." The song took 4–6 weeks to complete.

== Theme song ==
There have been nine different recorded versions of the theme song used over the years. The lyrics remained the same since the show's inception, but a number of verses were gradually cut back over the years due to "time restrictions".

Version	Artist	Duration
1	Karen Boddington and Mark Williams	January 1988 – June 1995 (Episodes 1–1700)
2	Doug Williams and Erana Clark	June 1995 – November 1999 (Episodes 1701–2755)
3	The Robertson Brothers	January 2000 – November 2003 (Episodes 2756–3650)
4	The Robertson Brothers	January 2004 – December 2006 (Episodes 3651–4330)
5	Israel Cannan	January – April 2007 (Episodes 4331–4400)
6	Luke Dolahenty	April 2007 – November 2008 (Episodes 4401–4770)
7	Luke Dolahenty and Tarryn Stokes	January – November 2009 (opening credits); February 2009 – March 2018 (international broadcasts closing credits)
8	Uncredited male vocalist	January 2018 – present March 2018 – present (international broadcasts closing credits)
9	Uncredited female vocalist	January 2018 – present March 2018 – present (international broadcasts closing credits)

The original version was sung by Karen Boddington and Mark Williams and used from 1988 until mid-1995. Their version was released as a single in the UK in 1989 and peaked at number 73 on the UK Singles Chart. A new version performed by Doug Williams and Erana Clark debuted in 1995. Their version was shortened the following year in 1996 and used until the end of 1999. In 2000, Australian sibling trio The Robertson Brothers recorded a new version of the theme song which was used until 2003. It was the first version to use only male vocals and was included in the soundtrack Home and Away: Songs From and Inspired by the Television Series (2000). The Robertson Brothers again recorded a shorter version of the theme song in 2004 and was used until the end of 2006. Their versions of the theme song became popular with viewers and gave the group widespread recognition, with concert goers demanding they play it at every concert.

In 2007, a new version was introduced and performed by Israel Cannan, who played the character Wazza in the show. After Cannan's version received many complaints from fans, the Seven Network decided to re-record the theme song in April 2007 with vocals provided by Luke Dolahenty. A shorter, 15-second version sung by Dolahenty and Tarryn Stokes debuted in 2009. From 2010 until 2017, the Home and Away theme song was not used in the show's opening titles and was replaced by a short instrumental version. However, Dolahenty and Stokes' version was still used in the closing credits for international broadcasts. In 2018, two new eight-second versions of the theme song made a return to the opening titles after an eight-year absence. One version is sung by a male vocalist, while the other version is sung by a female vocalist; in the opening titles, both only sing the last two lines of the theme: "closer each day, Home and Away". An extended 30-second version by the male vocalist was uploaded onto the Home and Away website. In March 2018, when the 2018 season debuted in the United Kingdom, the end theme was updated with the male vocalist's version, which still remain even on episodes which open with the female vocalist's version.

In 2025 a brand new set of opening credits debuted, with a new recording of the theme song, one male which was slower and a female one which was faster and more up beat. The lyrical arrangement matches the original closing credits which is slightly shorter than the opening was at around 45-50 seconds as it a verse shorter. The UK only showed the more upbeat female arrangement the shower version being used on the closing credits.

In 2026 another new set of credits debuted, this time with a return to a duet, a slightly slower more acoustic arrangement and a return to the original lyrical length and arrangement from 1988. In the UK these opening credits feature on every episode, however in other countries this varies.

== Reception ==
Dylan Evans of music website Tone Deaf included "Home and Away" on his list of "The 15 Best Australian TV Theme Songs", writing that although the song "has seen some changes, it still remains instantly recognisable to most Australians." Irish program Xposé included the theme song in their list of "The Best TV Theme Songs". Sam of TVFix placed it at number two on his list of the "Top 5 Australian TV Theme Songs", writing that "the tune captures the relaxed, melodramatic feel of living in a quiet beachside town that's the home of multiple murderers, psychotics and drama queens." He also added that it was better than the Neighbours theme song. Steven Viney of Noisey compared both songs, adding that the Home and Away theme "sounds like it could have easily been a Mariah Carey hit" and that it is "more melodic and pop oriented" than the Neighbours theme. David Elkin of The Daily Edge described it as a "catchy" tune that is "still stuck in everyone's head." In 2017, BuzzFeed writer Tahlia Pritchard added that the theme song should return to the opening titles, writing "Bring back those iconic lyrics!" Shain E. Thomas of entertainment website Harsh Light said it was an "idiotic move" of the show's producers to not use the song in the opening titles between 2010 and 2017. Ed Power of Irish Independent called it a "catchy" song that "certainly gets into your noggin and refuses to leave."

== Usage in media ==
Home and Away star Axle Whitehead (Liam Murphy) recorded a version of the theme song which was used in the show in 2012. Long-serving cast member Lynne McGranger (Irene Roberts) sang the song in a 2013 promotional video for broadcaster TVNZ 2 in New Zealand. In April 2016, the theme song was used in a television commercial promoting a storyline involving an explosion at the Summer Bay Caravan Park. Between December 2017 and February 2018, the theme song was also used in television commercials promoting the 2018 season premiere of Home and Away, as well as a sinkhole storyline involving long-time character Alf Stewart (Ray Meagher). In a promo for the 2019 season, the theme song was sung by the cast, who were sitting around a table, in lieu of a preview of what is to come.
