= Fix of Love =

Single by Mark Williams

from the album Mark Williams ZNZ
- B-side: "Your Love"
- Released: 13 August 1990
- Studio: Albert's Digital Studio, Sydney, Australia
- Genre: Pop; funk; soul
- Length: 3:44
- Label: Albert Productions
- Songwriter(s): Vanda & Young
- Producer(s): Vanda & Young

Mark Williams singles chronology
"Show No Mercy'" (1990)	"Fix of Love" (1990)	"Spell Is Broken" (1991)

Fix of Love is a song written and produced by Vanda & Young and performed by New Zealand singer songwriter, Mark Williams. Released in August 1990 as the second from his fifth studio album Mark Williams ZNZ (1990).

== Track listings ==
7" Single (Albert Productions 65623)

1. "Fix of Love" – 3:44
2. "Your Love" – 3:52

12" Single / CD Maxi

1. "Fix of Love" (The Big Fix) – 6:51
2. "Fix of Love" (It's a Fix) – 3:47
3. "Fix of Love" (Small Fix Mix) – 3:50

== Charts ==
Chart (1990)	Peak position
Australia (ARIA)	28
