= Karen Boddington and Mark Williams =

- Origin: Australia
- Genres: Vocal duet
- Labels: First Night

Karen Boddington and Mark Williams formed the Australian vocal duet that sang the original theme tune for the TV soap Home and Away. Mark Williams has performed with several other groups, while Karen Boddington was a vocalist for Almighty Records' Hi-NRG ABBA covers project Abbacadabra, alongside other singers such as Tracy Ackerman, Belle Lawrence and Martin Jenkins.

== Charts ==
The theme tune is entitled "Home and Away", and it was released on the First Night label. It entered the UK Singles Chart on 2 September 1989, and remained in the charts for only one week, reaching position 79.

== Usage ==
It was used as the theme tune to the show Home and Away from 1988 until 1995. There have been seven different full versions of the theme song used, including two by The Robertson Brothers.
