= Mark Williams ZNZ =

Studio album by Mark Williams
- Released: 3 August 1990
- Recorded: 1989–90
- Studio: Albert Studios, Sydney
- Genre: Pop; pop rock; Europop
- Label: Albert Productions, CBS Records
- Producer: Vanda & Young

Mark Williams chronology
Life After Dark (1979)	Mark Williams ZNZ (1990)	Mind Over Matter (1992)

Singles from Mark Williams ZNZ
- 1. "Show No Mercy" Released: 14 May 1990; 2. "Fix of Love" Released: August 1990; 3. "Spell is Broken" Released: January 1991; 4. "Feel for the Night" Released: 1993 (German release)

Mark Williams ZNZ is the fifth studio album by New Zealand singer Mark Williams. It was his first album in over ten years. The album spawned the most-successful single of his career in Australia, "Show No Mercy". The album was released in August 1990 and peaked at number 45 on the ARIA albums chart.

The album was released in Germany by Polydor Records under the title Show No Mercy in 1993.

== Track listing ==
CD (466609 2)

No.	Title	Writer(s)	Length
1.	"Show No Mercy"	Vanda & Young	4:21
2.	"Fix of Love"	Vanda & Young	3:44
3.	"Spell Is Broken"	Vanda & Young	4:07
4.	"Heavy Woman"	Vanda & Young	4:12
5.	"Good Thing"	Vanda & Young	4:12
6.	"Love Electric"	Vanda & Young	3:45
7.	"Shanghai Lily"	Vanda & Young	4:34
8.	"You're So Cool"	Vanda & Young	3:04
9.	"Feel for the Night"	Vanda & Young	4:01
10.	"Fool No More"	Vanda & Young	3:32

== Charts ==
Chart (1990)	Peak position
Australian Albums (ARIA)	45
