= Racing Cars =

Welsh pop band

- Origin: Rhondda Valley, Wales
- Genres: Pop
- Years active: 1973–2010
- Labels: Chrysalis Records, Angel Air
- Past members: Band members

Racing Cars was a Welsh pop band, formed in the Rhondda Valley, Wales, in 1973. Their only hit single was "They Shoot Horses, Don't They?", which peaked at number fourteen in the UK Singles Chart in 1977, and was inspired by the film, They Shoot Horses, Don't They? Touring included dates supporting Bad Company in 1976.

== Career ==
They were signed to one of the biggest British record labels of the time, Chrysalis Records. Racing Cars's debut album yielded their only hit single with "They Shoot Horses, Don't They?" It reached number fourteen in the UK Singles Chart in 1977, and was inspired by the film, They Shoot Horses, Don't They? Touring to promote their debut releases, Racing Cars backed Bad Company in 1976, including dates at Earls Court and the York Theatre Royal. Without any similar further chart appearances, Racing Cars ultimately acquired one-hit-wonder status. However, the band was sufficiently established on the touring circuit to issue two further albums in 1977 and 1978, which included bit parts for the session pianist Geraint Watkins; American saxophonist Jerry Jumonville; The Bowles Brothers Band (on vocal harmonies); and Ray Ennis from Newport who had previously played with a band called Good Habit. (Note. Not to be confused with Ray Ennis of Swinging Blue Jeans.) These never reached the same commercial heights. Vocalist Gareth 'Morty' Mortimer and guitarist Graham Williams had played together in local bands such as Morty and the Frantics and later evolutions including Strawberry Dust for years before. They were very well known in the Welsh club circuit.

Racing Cars split up for the first time in the late 1970s. In 1980, Morty released a solo album Love Blind. In 1981, Morty joined a band called The Bleeding Hearts with musicians Paul Rosser, Bob Watkins and Dave Iles, it was suggested by Morty that they call themselves Racing Cars, as it was his name. When this band came to an end, lead vocalist Morty has sung backing vocals for artists including The Beach Boys, Tina Turner and Bryan Adams. Morty got together with local musicians and formed the Gareth Thomas Mortimer Band (GTM Band).

Morty, Graham Hedley Williams and Paul Rosser reunited as Racing Cars but said "We were a bit reluctant. We're a bit long in the tooth and a bit out of touch but we finally said yes." They continued to play gigs across Europe, after reforming in 2000 with a new album, Bolt From The Blue which was released on DA Records and a gig at the Cardiff International Arena.

Racing Cars final album, Second Wind, was released in October 2007. Racing Cars performed a concert together on 11 April 2009 at the Parc and Dare theatre, Treorchy, and made an appearance at the tribute concerts for Man guitarist Micky Jones in Pontardawe on 18 September 2010. They also reformed for a one-off concert 'Rock at the Park' at Merthyr Tydfil's football ground, however these dates were without Simon Davies.

Gareth Mortimer died on 17 December 2015 at his home in Rhondda, Wales, from cancer at the age of 66.

== Band members ==
- Graham Headley Williams (guitarist)
- Gareth Mortimer (guitarist / lead vocalist) – aka Morty
- Simon Davies (keyboardist and vocals)
- Colin Griffin (drummer)
- Chris Thomas (bassist)
- Robert James Wilding (drummer)
- David Land (bassist)
- Ray 'Alice' Ennis (guitarist)
- Paul Saurin (keyboards)
- Paul Rosser (drummer and vocals)
- Bob Watkins (bassist)
- Dave Iles (guitarist)

== Discography ==
=== Albums ===
List of albums, with selected chart positions
Title	Album details	Peak chart positions
Title	Album details	AUS
Downtown Tonight	Released: 1976; Label: Chrysalis	39
Weekend Rendezvous	Released: 1977; Label: Chrysalis	—
Bring on the Night	Released: 1978; Label: Chrysalis	—
BBC Radio One Live in Concert	Released: 1992; Label: Windsong	—
Bolt from the Blue	Released: 2000; Label: DA Records	—
Second Wind	Released: 2007; Label: Angel Air	—

=== Singles ===
List of singles, with selected chart positions
Year	Title	Peak chart positions	
Year	Title	UK	AUS
1976	"They Shoot Horses Don't They?" b/w "Four Wheel Drive"	14	32
1977	"Ladee-Lo" b/w "Get Out and Get In"	—	—
1977	"Down by the River" b/w "Ticking Over"	—	—
1977	"Bring on the Night" b/w "When I'm Walking Home" or "Second Best"	—	—
1980	"Are You Big Enough" b/w "Little Miss World"	—	—

== See also ==
- Windsong International Records
- List of Peel Sessions
- List of performers on Top of the Pops
- Pinkpop Festival
