= Taking It All In Stride =

Studio album by Mark Williams
- Released: June 1977
- Recorded: 1976 /1977
- Genre: Pop; funk; soul
- Label: EMI New Zealand
- Producer: Alan Galbraith

Mark Williams chronology
Sweet Trials (1976)	Taking It All In Stride (1977)	Greatest Hits (1977)

Singles from Taking It All In Stride
- 1. "Taking It All in Stride" Released: November 1976; 2. "It Doesn't Matter Anymore" Released: April 1977; 3. "A House for Sale" Released: August 1977

Taking It All In Stride is the third studio album by New Zealand-born singer Mark Williams. It was released in June 1977. The album peaked at number 14 on the Official New Zealand Music Chart.

The album was the leading awardee at the 1976 New Zealand Music Awards gaining Producer, Engineer and Arranger Of The Year awards.

== Track listing ==
LP/Cassette (HSD 1055)

Side A
No.	Title	Writer(s)	Length
1.	"A House for Sale"	Carl Hampton, Homer Banks	4:02
2.	"It Doesn't Matter Anymore"	Paul Anka	2:42
3.	"Why Can't We Be Lovers?"	Holland-Dozier-Holland	3:26
4.	"Love Is Forever"	Tim Martin, Walt Meskell	2:56
5.	"This is the Life"	Geoff Murphy, Ian Watkin	3:50

Side B
No.	Title	Writer(s)	Length
1.	"If There's Still a Little Love" (with Sharon O'Neill)	Alan Hawkshaw, John Rostill	3:55
2.	"Rock & Roll Widow"	Tom Snow	5:00
3.	"True Love (Is Never Easy)"	Malcolm McCallum	5:31
4.	"Wonder of Wonders"	David Kahne	4:00
5.	"Taking It All in Stride"	Tom Snow	4:23

== Charts ==
Chart (1977)	Peak position
New Zealand Albums (RMNZ)	14
