= Show No Mercy (song) =

Single by Mark Williams

from the album Mark Williams ZNZ
- B-side: "You're So Cool"
- Released: 14 May 1990
- Recorded: 1989
- Studio: Albert's Digital Studio, Sydney, Australia
- Genre: Pop; rock; Europop
- Length: 3:38
- Label: Albert Productions
- Songwriter(s): Vanda & Young
- Producer(s): Vanda & Young

Mark Williams singles chronology
"Home and Away" (1989)	"Show No Mercy" (1990)	"Fix of Love" (1990)

"Show No Mercy" is a song written and produced by Vanda & Young and performed by New Zealand singer songwriter, Mark Williams. It was released in March 1990 as the lead single from his fifth studio album Mark Williams ZNZ (1990).

== Track listings ==
7" single (Albert Productions 655729)

1. "Show No Mercy" – 3:38
2. "Fool No More" – 3:32

12" single / CD Maxi

1. "Show No Mercy" (12" mix [remix by Peewee Ferris]) – 7:37
2. "Show No Mercy" (instrumental) – 4:32
3. "Show No Mercy" (album version) – 4:21
4. "You're So Cool" – 3:04

== Charts ==
=== Weekly charts ===
Weekly chart performance for "Show No Mercy"
Chart (1990)	Peak position
Australia (ARIA)	8
New Zealand (Recorded Music NZ)	9

=== Year-end charts ===
Year-end chart performance for "Show No Mercy"
Chart (1990)	Position
Australia (ARIA)	25

== Certifications ==
Certifications for "Show No Mercy"
Region	Certification	Certified units/sales
Australia (ARIA)	Platinum	70,000^{^}
^{^} Shipments figures based on certification alone.
