= Sweet Trials =

Studio album by Mark Williams
- Released: March 1976
- Recorded: 1975/1976
- Studio: EMI Studios, Wellington, New Zealand
- Genre: Pop; funk; soul
- Label: EMI Music
- Producer: Alan Galbraith

Mark Williams chronology
Mark Williams (1975)	Sweet Trials (1976)	Taking It All In Stride (1977)

Singles from Sweet Trials
- 1. "Sweet Wine" Released: October 1975; 2. "If It Rains" Released: April 1976

Sweet Trials is the second studio album by New Zealand-born singer Mark Williams. It was released in March 1976. The album peaked at number 14 on the Official New Zealand Music Chart.

== Reception ==
Suedo Nim from Victoria University of Wellington said Sweet Trials failed "to keep the grade" stating; "By use of mainly homespun material, a determinedly 'rocky' oriented approach to the album and brass backing leftovers from Grunt Machine, the end result is an overall lowering of quality." adding "Alan Galbraith's handling of production is competent enough but seems to have come in too heavy on the brass, at the expense of some possible rich orchestrations. The backing does tend to be loose, loud in places and superfluous in others which makes one wonder whether the album was less a solo one than a vehicle for contract groups to remain in employ. However, the album does have its highlights and Mark Williams does not disappoint.".

== Track listing ==
LP/Cassette (HSD 1046)

Side A
No.	Title	Writer(s)	Length
1.	"Introduction"	Alan Galbraith	1:30
2.	"Sweet Wine"	Reece Kirk	3:13
3.	"No Matter How Hard You Try"	Clinton Brown, Keith Norris, Kevin Bayley, Wayne Mason	3:55
4.	"Easy for Us"	Alan Galbraith, Mark Williams	3:35
5.	"Tears"	Paul Clayton	3:00
6.	"If It Rains"	Kiki Dee	3:10
7.	"Outro"	Alan Galbraith	0.35

Side B
No.	Title	Writer(s)	Length
1.	"Watch That Man"	David Bowie	3:47
2.	"I Can't Stand the Rain"	Ann Peebles, Don Bryant, Bernard "Bernie" Miller	5:20
3.	"Morning Sun Upon a Mountain"	Wayne Mason	4:30
4.	"Who Do You Think You Are?"	Alan Galbraith, Mark Williams	3:23
5.	"Sweet Trials" (featuring The Heartbreakers)	Alan Galbraith	4:05

== Charts ==
Chart (1976)	Peak position
New Zealand Albums (RMNZ)	14
