= Endless Flight (album) =

Studio album by Leo Sayer
- Released: 29 October 1976
- Recorded: 1976
- Studios: Studio 55, Los Angeles, California
- Genres: Pop rock, soft rock, blue-eyed soul, disco
- Length: 36:44
- Labels: Chrysalis (UK); Warner Bros. (US)
- Producer: Richard Perry

Leo Sayer chronology
Another Year (1975)	Endless Flight (1976)	Thunder in My Heart (1977)

Singles from Endless Flight
- 1. "You Make Me Feel Like Dancing" Released: October 1976; 2. "When I Need You" Released: February 1977; 3. "How Much Love" Released: July 1977

Endless Flight is the fourth studio album recorded by the English-Australian singer-songwriter Leo Sayer, which was released in 1976. It was released in the US and Canada by Warner Bros. Records and in the UK by Chrysalis Records.

The album consolidated his international popularity, reaching No. 4 in the UK and No. 10 in the US; it also charted strongly in other countries including Sweden, Norway, the Netherlands, Australia and New Zealand, and was certified as a platinum album in both the UK and the US, and double-platinum in Canada. The peak of his career came in 1977, when he scored two consecutive US number one hits, first with the disco-styled "You Make Me Feel Like Dancing" (a Grammy Award winner for the year's best Rhythm and Blues Song), followed by the romantic ballad, "When I Need You" (1977), which reached number one in both the UK and US. Written by Albert Hammond and Carole Bayer Sager, it was Sayer's first UK No. 1 single (after three number two hits). It was also the first of two UK chart-toppers in a row for producer Richard Perry.

== Reception ==
This album received critical acclaim upon release, and won a Grammy Award for the hit single "You Make Me Feel Like Dancing."

Professional ratings
Review scores
Source	Rating
Allmusic	4.5/5 stars
Christgau's Record Guide	B

== Track listing ==
=== Side one ===
1. "Hold On to My Love" (Barry Mann, Cynthia Weil, Sayer) – 3:08
2. "You Make Me Feel Like Dancing" (Vini Poncia, Sayer) – 3:40
3. "Reflections" (Holland-Dozier-Holland) – 3:07
4. "When I Need You" (Albert Hammond, Carole Bayer Sager) – 4:08
5. "No Business Like Love Business" (Brad Shapiro, Clarence Reid, Steve Alaimo, Willie Clarke) – 3:50

=== Side two ===
1. "I Hear the Laughter" (Johnny Vastano, Sayer) – 3:13
2. "Magdalena" (Danny O'Keefe) – 4:20
3. "How Much Love" (Barry Mann, Sayer) – 3:35
4. "I Think We Fell in Love Too Fast" (Johnny Vastano, Vini Poncia, Sayer) – 3:05
5. "Endless Flight" (Andrew Gold) – 4:38

== Personnel ==
=== Musicians ===
- Leo Sayer – guitar, harmonica, vocals
- John Barnes – piano, clavinet
- Bill Bodine, David Hungate, Andy Muson, Chuck Rainey, Willie Weeks – bass guitar
- Paul Buckmaster – synthesizer, cello, string arrangement, conductor
- Auburn Burrell, Lee Ritenour, John Vastano – guitar
- Larry Carlton – rhythm guitar
- Steve Gadd, Ed Greene, Nigel Olsson, Jeff Porcaro, Rick Shlosser – drums
- Bob Glaub – guitar, bass guitar
- Bobbye Hall – percussion
- John Barlow Jarvis – piano
- Mark T. Jordan – electric piano
- Clydie King – backing vocals
- Trevor Lawrence – horn
- Bobby Keys – saxophone on "When I Need You"
- Becky Lewis – backing vocals
- Steve Madaio – horn
- Sherlie Matthews – backing vocals
- Danny O'Keefe – performer
- Michael Omartian – electric piano
- Dean Parks – Dobro, guitar, electric guitar
- Bill Payne – electric piano
- Jimmy Phillips – synthesizer, Mellotron
- Earl Slick – guitar on "Reflections", acoustic guitar on "I Hear the Laughter"
- Richard Tee – piano
- James Newton Howard – synthesizer
- Gene Page – string arrangements, conductor

=== Production ===
- Record producer: Richard Perry
- Engineers: Bill Schnee, Howard Steele
- Photography: Elliot Gilbert

== Charts ==
=== Weekly charts ===
Weekly chart performance for Endless Flight
Chart (1976–1977)	Peak position
Australian Albums (Kent Music Report)	7
Canada Top Albums/CDs (RPM)	1
Dutch Albums (Album Top 100)	15
German Albums (Offizielle Top 100)	25
New Zealand Albums (RMNZ)	4
Norwegian Albums (VG-lista)	20
Swedish Albums (Sverigetopplistan)	27
UK Albums (Official Charts)	4
US Billboard 200	10

=== Year-end charts ===
Year-end chart performance for Endless Flight
Chart (1977)	Position
Australian Albums (Kent Music Report)	5
Canada Top Albums/CDs (RPM)	11
New Zealand Albums (RMNZ)	8
UK Albums (OCC)	8
US Billboard 200	16
