= Yesterday Was Just the Beginning of My Life =

Single by Mark Williams

from the album Mark Williams
- B-side: "Jimmy Loves Marianne"
- Released: May 1975
- Recorded: May 1974 – March 1975
- Studio: EMI Studios, Wellington, New Zealand
- Genre: Pop; funk; soul
- Length: 3:54
- Label: EMI Music
- Songwriter(s): Vanda & Young
- Producer(s): Alan Galbraith

Mark Williams singles chronology
"Celebration" (1974)	"Yesterday Was Just the Beginning of My Life" (1975)	"Sweet Wine" (1975)

"Yesterday Was Just the Beginning of My Life" is a song written by Vanda & Young and recorded by New Zealand-born singer-songwriter Mark Williams. The song was released in May 1975 as the second and final single from his debut studio album, Mark Williams (1975). The song peaked at number one on the New Zealand charts and was the highest selling single by a New Zealand artist in New Zealand in 1975.

== Background ==
Williams' manager and music producer, Alan Galbraith had chosen a rock-pop number written by Australian songwriting duo Harry Vanda and George Young (aka Vanda & Young). Williams originally was not keen on the track, but backed down and recorded the song with an alternate rearrangement with a rhythm and blues-soul sound. Galbraith said, "The original demo was nothing like the end result."

== Track listing ==
7" single (EMI – HR 538)

Side A: "Yesterday Was Just the Beginning of My Life"
Side B: "Jimmy Loves Marianne"

== Chart performance ==
=== Weekly charts ===
Chart (1975)	Peak position
New Zealand (Recorded Music NZ)	1

=== Year-end charts ===
Chart (1975)	Rank
New Zealand (Recorded Music NZ)	8
New Zealand Artist (Recorded Music NZ)	1

== See also ==
- List of number-one singles in 1975 (New Zealand)
- New Zealand Top 40 singles of 1975
