= When I Need You =

1977 single by Leo Sayer

- Portuguese vinyl single

Single by Leo Sayer

from the album Endless Flight
- B-side: "I Think We Fell in Love Too Fast"
- Released: February 1977
- Genre: Soft rock
- Length: 4:09
- Label: Chrysalis (UK); Warner Bros. (US)
- Songwriters: Albert Hammond; Carole Bayer Sager
- Producer: Richard Perry

Leo Sayer singles chronology
"You Make Me Feel Like Dancing" (1976)	"When I Need You" (1977)	"How Much Love" (1977)

"When I Need You" is a song written by Albert Hammond and Carole Bayer Sager. Its first appearance was as the title track of Hammond's 1976 album When I Need You. Leo Sayer's version, produced by Richard Perry, was a massive hit worldwide, reaching number 1 on the UK Singles Chart for three weeks in February 1977 after three of his earlier singles had stalled at number 2. It also reached number 1 on both the US Billboard Hot 100 for a single week in May 1977; and the Hot Adult Contemporary Tracks. Billboard ranked it as the No. 24 song of 1977. Sayer performed it on the second show of the third season of The Muppet Show.

== Melody comparison ==
The melody of the "hook" line, or chorus of "When I Need You" is identical to the part of the Leonard Cohen song "Famous Blue Raincoat", where the lyrics are as follows: "Jane came by with a lock of your hair, she said that you gave it to her that night, that you planned to go clear". The melody of these lyrics matches the lyrics of "When I Need You" as follows: "(When I) need you, I just close my eyes and I'm with you, and all that I so want to give you, is only a heart beat away".

In a 2006 interview with The Globe and Mail Cohen said:

I once had that nicking happen with Leo Sayer. Do you remember that song 'When I Need You'?" Cohen sings the chorus of Sayer's number one hit from 1977, then segues into 'And Jane came by with a lock of your hair', a lyric from 'Famous Blue Raincoat'. 'Somebody sued them on my behalf ... and they did settle', even though, he laughs, 'they hired a musicologist, who said, that particular motif was in the public domain and, in fact, could be traced back as far as Schubert.

== Personnel ==
- Leo Sayer – vocals
- John Barnes - electric piano
- James Newton Howard – synthesizer
- Bobby Keys – saxophone
- Michael Omartian – electric piano
- Dean Parks – electric guitar
- Jeff Porcaro – drums
- Willie Weeks – bass

== Charts ==
=== Weekly charts ===
Chart (1977)	Peak position
Australia (KMR)	8
Belgium (Ultratop 50 Flanders)	2
Belgium (Ultratop 50 Wallonia)	16
Canada Top Singles (RPM)	1
Canada Adult Contemporary (RPM)	2
Ireland (IRMA)	1
Netherlands (Dutch Top 40)	3
Netherlands (Single Top 100)	2
New Zealand (Recorded Music NZ)	4
South Africa (Springbok Radio)	2
UK Singles (Official Charts)	1
US Billboard Hot 100	1
US Adult Contemporary (Billboard)	1
US Hot R&B/Hip-Hop Songs (Billboard)	94
US Cash Box Top 100	1
Zimbabwe (ZIMA)	1

=== Year-end charts ===
Chart (1977)	Position
Australia (Kent Music Report)	15
Belgium (Ultratop Flanders)	37
Canada (RPM)	7
Netherlands (Dutch Top 40)	94
Netherlands (Single Top 100)	72
New Zealand (Recorded Music NZ)	16
UK Singles (OCC)	4
US Billboard Hot 100	24
US Adult Contemporary (Billboard)	20

== Other versions ==
- The song was covered in Malay by Black Dog Bone in 1977 as Bila Rindu. D'Lloyd, a band from Indonesia, also covered this version in 1978, the year after.
- The song was covered in German by Albatros in 1977 as Wenn mir nichts hilft.

=== Julio Iglesias version ===
Julio Iglesias released the song as the third and final single from his 1990 album of covers, Starry Night. It peaked at number 59 on the UK Airplay Chart.

=== Rod Stewart version ===
Rod Stewart recorded the song for his 1996 ballad compilation album If We Fall in Love Tonight. This version was produced by Jimmy Jam and Terry Lewis and was released as the second single from the album, and reached number 55 in Canada.

=== Celine Dion version ===
Canadian singer Celine Dion recorded a cover version of "When I Need You" for her 1997 album, Let's Talk About Love. Entertainment Weekly editor David Browne called it "an obligatory remake (a precisely enunciated version of Leo Sayer's "When I Need You")". The New York Observer editor Jonathan Bernstein wrote that "a sliver of redemption is found in the passable version of Leo Sayer's "When I Need You"".

=== Alpha Blondy version ===
Alpha Blondy covered the song for his 1999 album Elohim.

=== Randy Crawford & Joe Sample version ===
Singer Randy Crawford and keyboardist Joe Sample included their version of "When I Need You" on their 2006 album Feeling Good. Personnel included fellow acclaimed jazz artists, bassist Christian McBride and drummer Steve Gadd.

=== Cliff Richard version ===
On 29 October 2007, Cliff Richard released "When I Need You" as a single in the UK. It reached number 38 on the UK Singles Chart. It is one of five new recordings on his album Love... The Album.

=== Tumse Milke ===
The Indian music composer R.D. Burman used the music of the song for his song, "Tumse Milke", used in the 1989 movie, Parinda.

=== Lani Hall version ===
Lani Hall recorded a Spanish version of the song, retitled "Si me amaras (If you Loved Me)," for her 1985 album Es Fácil Amar, produced by Albert Hammond.
