= You Make Me Feel Like Dancing =

1976 single by Leo Sayer

Single by Leo Sayer

from the album Endless Flight
- B-side: "Magdalena"
- Released: October 1976
- Genre: Disco; pop; R&B
- Length: 3:41; 2:50 (7″ version)
- Label: Chrysalis (UK); Warner Bros. (US)
- Songwriters: Leo Sayer; Vini Poncia
- Producer: Richard Perry

Leo Sayer singles chronology
"Moonlighting" (1975)	"You Make Me Feel Like Dancing" (1976)	"When I Need You" (1977)

Music Video
- "You Make Me Feel Like Dancing" on YouTube

"You Make Me Feel Like Dancing" is a song by the English singer Leo Sayer, taken from his 1976 album Endless Flight. It reached number one on the US Billboard Hot 100 chart, making it his first top single in the United States, and reached number two on the UK singles chart. Billboard ranked it the number 13 song of 1977.

Credited songwriters Sayer and Vini Poncia won a Grammy Award for the song in 1978 for Best R&B Song. Ray Parker Jr, who was a session musician at the time, has stated that he was the original songwriter and that when he gave the tune as a demo, his accreditation as such was missed. "It's not Leo's fault," Parker told Variety. "He tried to cut six or seven more of my songs just because he felt so bad."

Like other Sayer songs from that time, it features extensive use of the singer's falsetto voice, a very popular vocal register in disco-era songs. Sayer performed the song in the thirteenth episode of the second season of "Saturday Night Live" and the second episode of season 3 of The Muppet Show.

== Personnel ==
- Leo Sayer – vocals
- John Barnes – electric piano, clavinet
- Larry Carlton, Ray Parker Jr. – guitar
- Steve Gadd – drums
- Jeff Porcaro – drums (verse 3 onwards)
- Clydie King, Becky Louis, Sherlie Matthews – background vocals
- Chuck Rainey – bass
- Gene Page – string arrangements

== Chart performance ==
=== Weekly charts ===
Chart (1976–1977)	Peak position
Australia (Kent Music Report)	2
Canada Adult Contemporary (RPM)	18
Canada Top Singles (RPM)	1
Ireland (IRMA)	5
Netherlands (Single Top 100)	11
New Zealand (Recorded Music NZ)	1
South Africa (Springbok Radio)	3
Sweden (Sverigetopplistan)	19
Switzerland (Sonntagsblick Hitparade)	18
UK Singles (Official Charts)	2
US Adult Contemporary (Billboard)	19
US Hot R&B/Hip-Hop Songs (Billboard)	43
US Billboard Hot 100	1
West Germany (GfK)	9

=== Year-end charts ===
Chart (1976)	Rank
Australia (Kent Music Report)	84
Canada	99

Chart (1977)	Rank
Australia (Kent Music Report)	49
Canada	30
New Zealand	27
U.S. Billboard Hot 100	13

=== All-time charts ===
Chart (1958–2018)	Position
US Billboard Hot 100	594

== Cover versions ==
- Lee Ritenour brought back drummer Steve Gadd among other session stars to add this cover to his 1979 album, Feel the Night.
- DTV, in 1984, set the song to The Grasshopper and the Ants.
- In 2000, American singer-songwriter Carmen Carter and gospel singer Donnie McClurkin covered the song for the soundtrack to the 2000 film An Extremely Goofy Movie.
- A remixed version of "You Make Me Feel Like Dancing" credited to Groove Generation featuring Leo Sayer charted on the UK Singles Chart in 1998, peaking at No.32.
- In 2008, the Wiggles sang the song as the title work of their DVD You Make Me Feel Like Dancing, with Leo Sayer guest starring.
