= Splinter (band) =

British folk rock duo

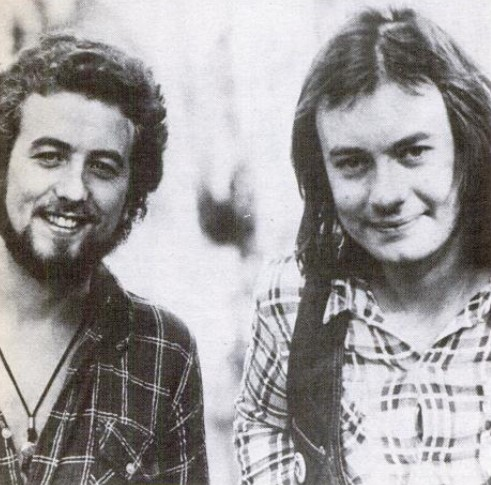
- Elliott and Purvis in 1974

Background information
- Origin: South Shields, England
- Genres: Rock, folk rock
- Years active: 1971–1984
- Past members: Bill Elliott; Bobby Purvis

Splinter was an English two-man vocal group from South Shields, England, consisting of Bill Elliott (William Elliott) and Bobby Purvis (Robert J Purvis), who formed in the early 1970s.

They were connected with ex-Beatle George Harrison, and had groups of instrumentalists to back them on each album. Splinter was the first act signed to Harrison's Dark Horse Records label, when it was partnered with A&M Records. The band's sound has often been likened to that of The Beatles (particularly George Harrison and John Lennon) and Badfinger. The duo's biggest success came with their debut album, the critically admired The Place I Love (1974), which contained the hit single "Costafine Town". All of their albums have been remastered and reissued on compact disc on the Big Pink Music label from South Korea and Britain’s Grey Scale label.

Elliott died on 7 June 2021 following a sudden illness. According to the Legacy Project website: "He was always 100% supportive of the Legacy Project and we will continue to move this forward as planned. The next album Splinter Live In England will be released in the near future, and it displays Billy and Bobby as they were never intended to be heard on record."

== History ==
=== Making their debut album ===
Splinter, who had worked together at various times in the Newcastle and London music scenes, first came to the attention of Harrison through Mal Evans, a longtime assistant to The Beatles and latterly a scout for Apple Records. Harrison was impressed with one of their songs, "Lonely Man", which he felt would be ideal for a film he was producing, based on the stage play Little Malcolm and His Struggle Against the Eunuchs. Harrison and his then bride of two weeks Patti Boyd attended the play's opening in 1966.

Harrison initially intended to sign Splinter to Apple Records and held sessions at Apple Studio in central London to work on the song; Harrison associate Pete Ham (of Badfinger) also participated in these sessions, held in mid-1973. Plans were made for "Lonely Man" to be released as an Apple single and Splinter were shown performing the piece in the Apple film. In 1971, Bill Elliot was featured on an Apple single (#1835) "God Save Us" b/w "Do the Oz" both written by Lennon/Ono and under the moniker of "Bill Elliot and The Plastic Oz Band" on the A side. The B side was credited to the "Elastic Oz Band". Elliot was also featured on the 45 rpm picture sleeve.

But, as Apple fell apart, Harrison decided to establish his own record label, setting up offices in London on Royal Avenue and in Los Angeles. Once Harrison heard more Splinter material, he invited them to record an album. Work on this spanned 17 months, with the majority of the sessions taking place at Harrison's Friar Park studio, FPSHOT. Also during this period, Purvis and Elliot co-wrote the song "Kyle" with Gary Wright, another friend of Harrison's who contributed to the lengthy sessions for Splinter's album. ("Kyle" appeared on the 1974 Spooky Tooth album The Mirror.)

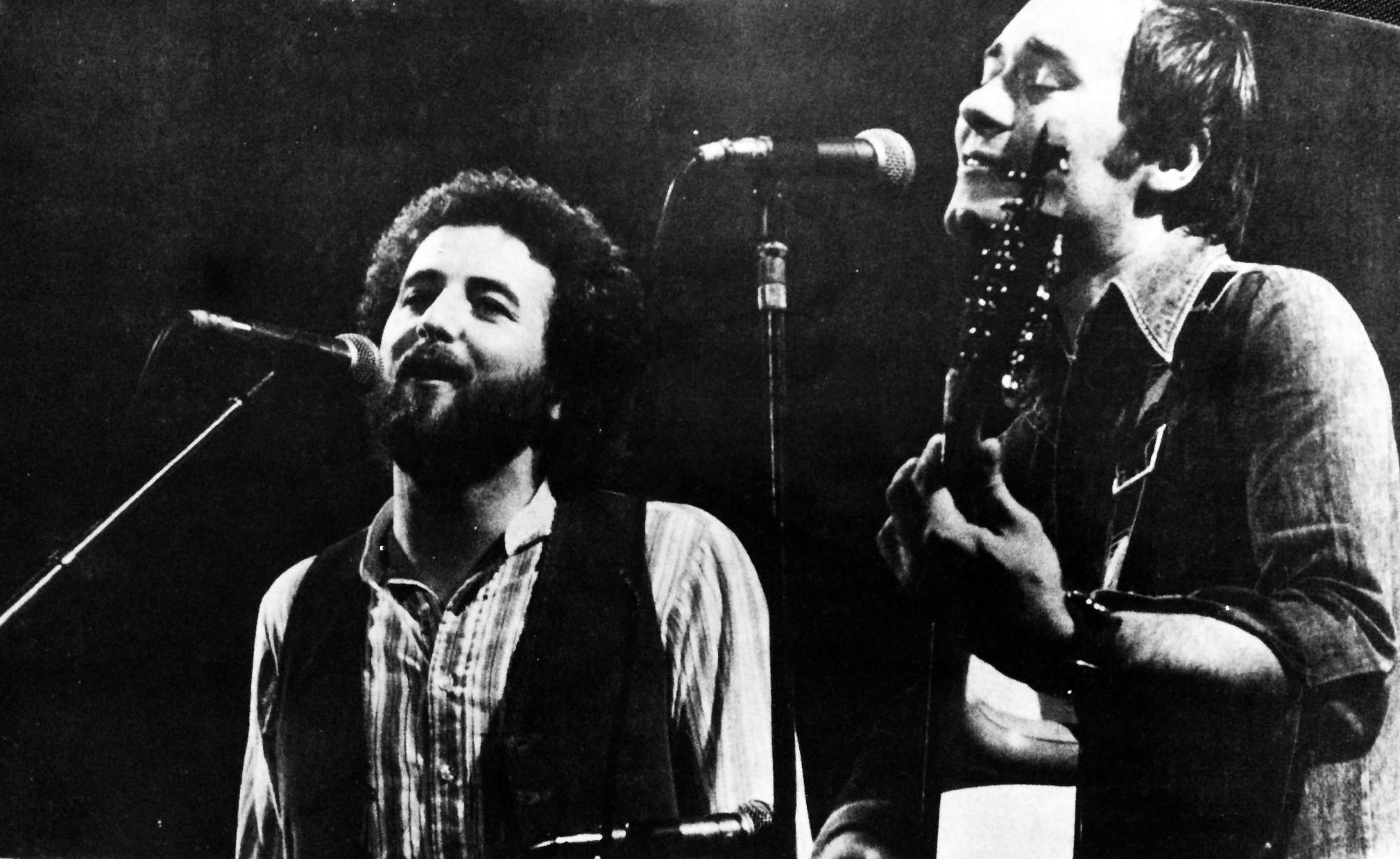
Splinter at the Theatre des Champs Elysees in Paris November 1977 Photo : Jean Helfer

On their Dark Horse Records debut album, The Place I Love, Harrison produced all the songs and played a variety of instruments, including electric and acoustic guitars, dobro, bass guitar and harmonium. As well as Wright, other musicians included Alvin Lee, Billy Preston, Jim Keltner, Klaus Voormann, Willie Weeks and Mel Collins. The album was so heavy with George Harrison's participation that it was rumoured that this was secretly Harrison's new band.

Most of the songs were written by Purvis, with Elliott co-writing lyrics on "China Light" and "Costafine Town". "Costafine Town" was an international hit single, reaching the top ten in Australia and South Africa, and the top 20 in the United Kingdom. Both this single and the album also charted on the Billboard charts in the United States. The follow-up single, "Drink All Day", was banned in the UK by the BBC for the inclusion of the word "bloody".

=== Working in the 70s ===
In preparing for Splinter's second album, Harder to Live, Harrison arranged for them to record at A&M Studios in Los Angeles during the late spring and early summer of 1975. The band were unable to use the studio time, however, due to Purvis suffering from hay fever, apparently brought on by the LA smog. Since Harrison was in town working with fellow Dark Horse acts such as Keltner's band Attitudes, he instead used the pre-booked studio time to record his own album, Extra Texture. This would be Harrison's last Apple album.

Harrison only participated on one track on Harder to Live – a new version of "Lonely Man". The original recording from 1973 remains unreleased, apart from its appearance in the Little Malcolm movie. The song was co-produced by Harrison and Tom Scott, and featured Harrison on guitar. "Lonely Man" was a hit in Japan, and, in recording a version of the song in Japanese, Splinter became the first western artists to sing in that language. They were helped to achieve this by Japanese actor and singer Masatoshi Nakamura. The Japanese single credited the song as written by B Pervis/M Evans. Another set of musicians provided backing: Chris Spedding, Waddy Wachtel and John Taylor. Recently the film "Little Malcolm" has been released on DVD and Blu-ray in the UK.

Also during this period, Splinter won the Outstanding Song Award at the 1976 Yamaha World Popular Song Festival, held at the Budokan in Tokyo, with their song "Love Is Not Enough". This performance was released on an album that documented this annual song festival. As a result of this success, "Love Is Not Enough" was released as a single in Japan. This first version was produced by Tom Scott, and is a different arrangement from the one that subsequently appeared on Two Man Band.

After Two Man Band, Splinter recorded two more albums that were each released in just two countries. The first of these, Streets at Night, was issued only in Japan, in 1979. Purvis and Elliott produced and arranged this album themselves. Streets at Night featured Alan Clark, who played keyboards, synthesizers and clavinet.

During this period, Splinter were associated with the Japanese music TV station NTVM, and worked with the Japanese rock band Godiego. A single of Splinter singing the Godiego song "Ghandara" (associated with the TV show Monkey) was released, and they also appeared on a compilation album, Our Favourite Songs, a set led by members of Godiego. A single "Danger Zone" b/w "Swear to God" was released in the UK in 1979 on Barn Records.

=== Last albums and splitting up ===
Splinter toured America briefly as an opening act for Duran Duran and other 80s British bands touring at the time.

Although the duo of Purvis and Elliott continued to perform together until 1984, Two Man Band was the last Splinter album released in most countries and their final album on Dark Horse Records. Harrison is credited as co-executive producer, and played some of the guitar. The main production duties were entrusted to Norbert Putnam. This album had two singles released "Round & Round" b/w "I'll Bend for You" (the latter was a non-LP track) and "Motions of Love", a double- sided promo single in 1977. "Motions" did get released in 1978 with a B side of "I Need Your Love".

The final Splinter album was Splinter, which was released in the UK in 1980 on the Bellaphon label. The album was also issued in Japan the following year under the title Sail Away, with a song called "Pigalle" used in place of "All That Love".

Splinter finally split up in 1984. In recent years, Purvis has re-emerged as a performer and composer, working for a British cancer research charity.

=== Legacy project ===
In 2019, both members of Splinter, realising their recordings were not on the market and had not been for some considerable time (except on unofficial Korean and British reissues), decided to commence a Legacy Project, thus ensuring that unreleased material will be made available to fans. In October 2020, they released Never Went Back, an album consisting of recordings of rehearsals for their 1981 tour.

== Discography ==
=== Albums ===
- 1974: The Place I Love (US Dark Horse SP 22001) (UK AMLH 22001) (Japan King AML-220)
- 1975: Splinter (Dark Horse DH2) Promo album of acoustic demos released in plain white sleeve. Said to have been limited to 100 copies.
- 1975: Harder to Live (US Dark Horse SP-22006) (UK AMLH 22006) (Japan King GP-270)
- 1976: World Popular Song Festival in Tokio '76 (Yamaha YL 7615)
- 1977: Two Man Band (US Dark Horse DH 3073 or Warner K 17009 ) (UK DRC 8439) (Japan Warner P-10425D)
- 1979: Streets at Night (Columbia YX-7228-AX)
- 1979: Our Favourite Songs (Columbia YX-7240-AX)
- 1980: Splinter (Bellaphon BPLP 002)
  - 1981: Sail Away (Columbia Japan YX-7292-AX; same tracks as Splinter)
- 2020: Never Went Back - The Legacy Series Volume 1 (Gonzo Multimedia, HST562CD)
- 2020: Live in England - The Legacy Series Volume 2 (Grey Scale, GSGZ335CD; unofficial release)

=== Album details ===
==== The Place I Love ====
See The Place I Love

==== Harder to Live ====
Track listing:

1. "Please Help Me"
2. "Sixty Miles Too Far"
3. "Harder to Live"
4. "Half Way There"
5. "Which Way Will I Get Home"
6. "Berkley House Hotel"
7. "After Five Years"
8. "Green Line Bus"
9. "Lonely Man"
10. "What Is It (If You Never Ever Tried It Yourself)"

==== Two Man Band ====
Track listing:

1. "Little Girl"
2. "Round & Round"
3. "Baby Love"
4. "I Apologize"
5. "Black Friday"
6. "New York City (Who Am I)"
7. "I Need Your Love"
8. "Motions of Love"
9. "Silver"
10. "Love Is Not Enough"

==== Streets At Night ====
Track listing:

1. "Streets At Night"
2. "I Can't Turn You On"
3. "Is It for Life"
4. "Stateside Girl"
5. "Evergreen"
6. "Danger Zone"
7. "When Will You Let Go"
8. "Where Do I Go from Here?"
9. "Took My Breath Away"
10. "Flyin' Blind"

==== Splinter ====
Track listing:

1. "Innocent"
2. "Plane Leaving Tokyo"
3. "Another Time Another Place"
4. "Too Far Down the Line"
5. "Take It or Leave It"
6. "Passing Through"
7. "Touch Yet Never Feel"
8. "Don't Leave Me Now"
9. "All That Love"
10. "Sailaway"

=== Singles ===
- 1971: "God Save Us" Bill Elliot and The Elastic Oz Band /B side "Do the Oz" Elastic Oz Band (Apple 1835)
- 1974: "Costafine Town" / "Elly-May" (UK AMS 7135) (US DH 10002) (Japan King AM-232) (Germany 13 607 AT) – UK No. 17 AUS No. 16
- 1975: "Drink All Day" / "Haven't Got Time" (UK AMS 5501) (Germany 13 842 AT)
- 1975: "China Light" / "Drink All Day" (UK AMS 5502)
- 1975: "China Light" / "Haven't Got Time" (US DH 10003)
- 1975: "Which Way Will I Get Home" / "Green Line Bus" (UK AMS 5503)
- 1976: "Which Way Will I Get Home" / "What Is It" (US DH 10007)
- 1976: "Half Way There" / "What Is It" (UK AMS 5506) AUS No. 85
- 1976: "After Five Years" / "Half Way There" (US DH 10010)
- 1976: "Lonely Man" (in Japanese) / "Lonely Man" (Japan King CM 2006)
- 1976: "Love Is Not Enough" / "White Shoe Weather" (Japan Warner P-77D)
- 1977: "Sun Shine on Me" / "What Is It" (Japan Warner P-94D)
- 1977: "Round and Round" / "I'll Bend for You" (US DRC 8439) (UK K 17009)
- 1977: "Motions of Love" / "Motions of Love' Promo (DRC 8523)
- 1977: "Black Friday" / "Silver" (Japan Warner P-239D)
- 1978: "Motions of Love" / "I Need Your Love" (US DRC 8523)
- 1978: "New York City" / "Baby Love" (UK K 17116)
- 1978: "Taking Off / "Touch and Go" (Japan Columbia YK-113-AX)
- 1979: "I Can't Turn You On" / "Where Do I Go from Here?" (Japan Columbia YK-115-AX)
- 1979: "If Somewhere and Somehow" / "Gandhara" (Japan Columbia YK-129-AX)
- 1979: "Danger Zone" /"Swear to God" (Uk Barn Records Barn 004)
- 1981: "Touch Yet Never Feel" / "Pigalle" (Japan Columbia YH-2-AX)
- 1981: "I Can't Turn You On" / "Touch Yet Never Feel" (Japan Columbia TD-1067) (sample only)
