= Swing Your Daddy =

Song by Jim Gilstrap
- B-side: "Swing Your Daddy, Pt. 2"
- Released: 1975
- Label: Roxbury Records RB-2006
- Songwriter: Kenny Nolan
- Producer: Kenny Nolan

"Swing Your Daddy" was a 1975 single for singer Jim Gilstrap. It became a hit for him that year, charting in various countries around the world.

== Background ==
"Swing Your Daddy" was composed by Kenny Nolan. The song was copyrighted in 1974. The song which was recorded by Jim Gilstrap was backed with "Swing Your Daddy Pt. 2", and released in the US on Roxbury 2006.

== Reception ==
The single was one of the Record World Single Picks for the week of 8 February 1975. In the short review, besides mentioning that the composer and producer was Kenny Nolan, the reviewer called the song an early-Impressions type of sound. Taking note of three songs by producer and writer Nolan that were currently charting well, the reviewer also wrote that the single should make it four.

== Charts ==
For the week of 15 February 1975, "Swing Your Daddy" debuted at no. 137 in the Record World 101 - 150 Singles Chart. Having reached the position of 104 in the Record World 101 - 150 Singles Chart in the previous week, the single made its debut at no. 88 in the Record World Singles chart for the week of 1 March. It also debuted at no. 62 in the Record World R&B Singles chart. For the week of 19 April, and at its eighth charting week, the single peaked at no. no 61 in the Record World Singles chart, and at no. 23 in the Record World R&B Singles chart. It would stay in the R&B chart until 10 May.

Also in the US, the song made it to no. 55 in the US on the Billboard chart.

In Australia and Canada it reached no. 64 and 63 respectively.

In the UK, it got to no. 4. It spent 19 weeks in the New Zealand charts, peaking at no. 9.

== Other versions ==
South African singer Lionel Petersen recorded a version which appeared on his album, I'll Take You Where the Music's Playing.
