= The Place I Love =

Studio album by Splinter
- Released: 20 September 1974
- Recorded: mid 1973 – August 1974
- Studio: FPSHOT, Oxfordshire
- Genre: Rock, folk rock
- Length: 36:18
- Label: Dark Horse
- Producer: George Harrison

Splinter chronology
The Place I Love (1974)	Harder to Live (1975)

Singles from The Place I Love
- 1. "Costafine Town" Released: 13 September 1974 (UK); 7 November 1974 (US); 2. "Drink All Day (Got to Find Your Own Way Home)" Released: 7 February 1975 (UK); 3. "China Light" Released: 21 February 1975 (UK); 7 March 1975 (US)

The Place I Love is the debut album by English vocal duo Splinter, released on Dark Horse Records in September 1974. It was the first album released by the Dark Horse label, which was owned by George Harrison, who also produced the album. Recording sessions took place at Harrison's Friar Park home studio in Oxfordshire and featured extensive musical contributions from Harrison, on guitar, keyboards and other instruments, as well as participants such as Gary Wright, Billy Preston, Jim Keltner and Alvin Lee. "Costafine Town", the first single from the album, was a top-twenty hit in the United Kingdom and other countries.

On release, the album received favourable reviews from a number of critics, who likened its sound to that of the Beatles, Badfinger and Plastic Ono Band. Having long been unavailable, The Place I Love was issued on CD in 2015.

== Background ==
Splinter's Bobby Purvis and Bill Elliott had had links with the Beatles for some time before they came to work with George Harrison, since Mal Evans, in his role as a talent scout for Apple Records, had discovered the duo (then playing in the Newcastle band Half Breed) and become their manager. Following his involvement with the music documentaries Raga (1971) and The Concert for Bangladesh (1972), Harrison's first foray into feature-film production was Little Malcolm (1974), directed by Stuart Cooper and shot primarily in Lancashire during February and March 1973. A song was needed for a pivotal scene in the movie, for which Evans suggested the Purvis composition "Another Chance I Let Go", subsequently retitled "Lonely Man". Harrison was impressed and arranged sessions at Apple Studios in central London to record the song, with a view to issuing it as a single to coincide with the release of Little Malcolm. With Harrison as producer and contributing his signature slide guitars, Purvis and Elliott were backed by Pete Ham from Apple band Badfinger, as well as an unnamed bassist and drummer.

According to Cooper, however, the whole film project then became tied up in the litigation surrounding Apple Corps, delaying the release of Little Malcolm indefinitely. Even before this development, Harrison had heard more of Purvis's songs and invited the duo to record a full album. "Splinter had all the qualities that Harrison admired in abundance," Simon Leng has written in his musical biography of the ex-Beatle, While My Guitar Gently Weeps, noting Purvis's strength as a songwriter, Elliott's powerful vocals, and the pair's "lush harmonies". Keen to continue his role as a record producer and mentor for other artists after the scaling down of Apple Records, Harrison set about establishing his own label, which he would launch in May 1974 as Dark Horse. Splinter were the first rock act signed to the label, apparently after considering Threshold Records, followed by Indian classical musician Ravi Shankar.

== Production ==
Sessions began for Splinter's album straight after the recording of "Lonely Man"; like this track, "Love Is Not Enough" was taped at Apple Studio during 1973, but it would be re-recorded for release on the band's third album, Two Man Band (1977). (Note: Purvis and Elliot recorded a new version of "Lonely Man" also, which appeared on their 1975 album Harder to Live.) Work on The Place I Love is said to have taken seventeen months, as Harrison encouraged Purvis and Elliott to refine their vocal sound in the studio and rework their songs, adding many ideas of his own. After completing demos in London, recording was relocated to Harrison's state-of-the-art home studio, FPSHOT, at Friar Park in Oxfordshire. One of a number of Harrison's musician friends to contribute to the project, Gary Wright served as a "sounding board and musical amanuensis", according to Leng. Phil McDonald was the recording engineer, as he had been on Harrison's recent album, Living in the Material World (1973). Other top-level musicians to guest on the backing tracks included Klaus Voormann (on electric and acoustic bass), Billy Preston (organ and piano), Willie Weeks (bass) and Jim Keltner (drums).

By the end of January 1974, before heading off to India for a month, Harrison included portions of Splinter's unfinished songs "Gravy Train", "Somebody's City", "Drink All Day", "The Place I Love" and "China Light" on a tape for record-industry boss David Geffen. Hoping to secure a US distributor for his nascent record label, and considering Splinter the "jewel in Dark Horse's crown", Harrison added comments stressing to Geffen the band's "really good" songwriting. (Note: Harrison eventually agreed terms with A&M Records as worldwide distributor for the label.)

The overdubbing phase of the album took place "over a period of months", Leng writes, Harrison "piec[ing] it together as if he were creating a mosaic". While Elliott and Purvis perfected their vocals parts, Alvin Lee added guitar to "Gravy Train" and "Haven't Got Time", and Mel Collins' "well-targeted horn charts" featured on three tracks. Harrison's own contributions throughout the album included a variety of electric and acoustic guitar parts, as well as dobro, bass, harmonium and Moog synthesizer, mandolin, and various percussive instruments. Since he was still under contract to Apple, all these parts would be credited to three Harrison pseudonyms that were becoming increasingly well known to record buyers: Hari Georgeson, Jai Raj Harisein and P. Roducer. Splinter were impressed at their producer's ability to work "for 24 hours straight", and Purvis later told Leng that Harrison "bent over backwards to make us happy". In truth, however, Harrison's commitment to Splinter's debut, and to the Shankar projects Shankar Family & Friends (1974) and Music Festival from India, had a detrimental effect on his own career, since he would be forced to rush-record his Dark Horse album (1974) while preparing for a North American tour (again with Shankar) at the end of the year. The over-exertion resulted in Harrison losing his voice and finally contracting laryngitis during rehearsals in Los Angeles. (Note: Another factor was Harrison's lifestyle during the 1973–74 period, which marked the end of his marriage to Pattie Boyd. While discussing the Splinter and Shankar albums in an interview for Houston radio station KLOL, midway through his tour, Harrison asked listeners to help make The Place I Love a hit – and joked that he would need to sell 5 million copies of the album just to cover the cost of all the brandy consumed during its production.)

== Release ==
Dark Horse Records issued The Place I Love in late September 1974 in Britain and America, with the Dark Horse catalog number 22001, signifying that it was the label's first album release. "Costafine Town" backed with "Elly-May" was issued as a single on 13 September in the UK, although its US release was delayed by two months. The album cover photo was taken by Terry O'Neill at Friar Park, showing Elliott and Purvis standing on the large stones that cross one of the property's lakes. Promotion for the album included feature articles in Melody Maker and advertisements in American music magazines Billboard and Circus Raves.

Splinter's debut album brought Purvis and Elliott the only British and American chart success of their career: "Costafine Town" reaching number 17 in the UK and number 77 on the Billboard Hot 100, while The Place I Love peaked at number 81 on the Billboard Top LPs & Tape chart. In addition, "Costafine Town" peaked at number 8 in New Zealand and was also a top-ten hit in Australia. Released in February 1975, the follow-up single in Britain was the rustic "Drink All Day", which, after being banned by the BBC for containing the word "bloody", was immediately followed by "China Light", the second single from the album in the United States.

== Reception ==
Professional ratings
Review scores
Source	Rating
AllMusic	4.5/5 stars
Melody Maker	(favourable)
Phonograph Record	(favourable)

NME critic Bob Woffinden described "Costafine Town" as a "very promising beginning" for both Splinter and the new record label. Reviewing the single, Billboard wrote of the band's "strong harmony vocals" on a recording that was an "extremely pleasing, AM oriented cut". The album was played before many of Harrison and Shankar's North American shows in November and December 1974, leading to positive comments from concert reviewers. In his 1977 book The Beatles Forever, Nicholas Schaffner noted the "exquisite music" on The Place I Love, and deemed it a "gorgeous fantasy" of what Harrison's Dark Horse album "should have sounded like".

Writing in Melody Maker in September 1974, Chris Irwin described The Place I Love as an "outstanding [debut]", which benefited from Harrison's "clean, unmuddled production job" and musical contributions, as well as those of Billy Preston. Irwin suggested that it might have been "just another album" without this outside participation, but acknowledged that Splinter "have undoubtedly got something real and fresh to offer" and "[stamp] their own sweetly flowing style on the record, with an impressive collection of songs". In his review for Phonograph Record, Greg Shaw wrote that "Elliott and Purvis are faultless singers and as songwriters they have great potential". Shaw identified "China Light", "Costafine Town", "Situation Vacant" and "Somebody's City" as possible hit singles, adding: "each is a minor classic within the genre, flawlessly produced and full of the stirring melodies and tasty little touches that make a song linger in your head for years." While remarking on the band's obvious stylistic influences – from Badfinger and late-period Beatles to the Hudson Brothers – Shaw also bemoaned that, although the album's use of "the George Harrison Sound (or the Mantovani Sound updated) … works, just like the modern Nashville studio sound works", Splinter needed to establish its own identity by recruiting dedicated backing musicians.

Writing in 2001, Bruce Eder of AllMusic described The Place I Love as sounding like "very good Badfinger outtakes" and "a cross between the Plastic Ono Band on a very good day and very melodic offshoots of All Things Must Pass in its leaner moments". As highlights, he singled out "Somebody's City" (an "absolute jewel", featuring some of Harrison's "best and flashiest" guitar playing), "Gravy Train" ("practically a sequel to 'Get Back'") and "Costafine Town" ("a warmly nostalgia-laden tune with a memorable melody and gorgeous singing"). Eder bemoaned that the album had yet to be released on CD, adding: "Splinter deserved to be remembered, but so far their recognition has only come from the hardcore underground network of Beatles enthusiasts."

Former Mojo editor Mat Snow has described The Place I Love as "a lost minor classic". Simon Leng similarly views it as an "overlooked classic", as well as the best album that Harrison worked on between Living in the Material World and his 1976 debut on Dark Horse, Thirty Three & 1/3. In his review of the 2006 reissue of Material World, Eder again lamented the unavailability of Splinter's Dark Horse recordings, which he considered to be "some of George's finest work in conjunction with other artists". "The Place I Love" was finally issued on CD in 2015, by the South Korean label Big Pink Music.

== Track listing ==
All songs by Robert J. Purvis, except where noted.

Side one

1. "Gravy Train" – 4:50
2. "Drink All Day (Got to Find Your Own Way Home)" – 3:20
3. "China Light" (Robert J. Purvis, William Elliott) – 4:35
4. "Somebody's City" – 5:20

Side two

5. "Costafine Town" (Robert J. Purvis, William Elliott) – 3:10
6. "The Place I Love" – 4:25
7. "Situation Vacant" – 4:00
8. "Elly-May" – 2:43
9. "Haven't Got Time" – 3:55

== Personnel ==
- Bill Elliott – vocals (all tracks)
- Bobby Purvis – vocals (all tracks)
- George Harrison – acoustic guitar (2, 3, 4, 6, 8), electric guitar (1, 4, 6, 7, 9), 12-string acoustic guitar (2, 4), dobro (2, 6), mandolin (3), bass (5), 6-string bass (5), harmonium (2, 5), percussion (2, 4, 5, 6, 9), jew's harp (2), Moog synthesizer (8), backing vocals (7)
- Gary Wright – piano (4, 5, 8), electric piano (6, 7)
- Klaus Voormann – bass guitar (1, 4, 6, 9), standup bass (2, 8)
- Mike Kellie – drums (1, 3, 4, 5, 6, 8, 9)
- Billy Preston – organ (3), piano (1)
- Willie Weeks – bass guitar (3, 7)
- Jim Keltner – drums (2, 7)
- Alvin Lee – electric guitar (1, 9)
- Graham Maitland – accordion (5)
- Mel Collins – horn arrangement (1, 7, 9)

== Charts ==
Chart (1975)	Peak position
Australia (Kent Music Report)	69

== Sources ==
- Keith Badman, The Beatles Diary Volume 2: After the Break-Up 1970–2001, Omnibus Press (London, 2001; ISBN 0-7119-8307-0).
- Harry Castleman & Walter J. Podrazik, All Together Now: The First Complete Beatles Discography 1961–1975, Ballantine Books (New York, NY, 1976; ISBN 0-345-25680-8).
- Alan Clayson, George Harrison, Sanctuary (London, 2003; ISBN 1-86074-489-3).
- Olivia Harrison, George Harrison: Living in the Material World, Abrams (New York, NY, 2011; ISBN 978-1-4197-0220-4).
- Elliot J. Huntley, Mystical One: George Harrison – After the Break-up of the Beatles, Guernica Editions (Toronto, ON, 2006; ISBN 1-55071-197-0).
- Ian Inglis, The Words and Music of George Harrison, Praeger (Santa Barbara, CA, 2010; ISBN 978-0-313-37532-3).
- Simon Leng, While My Guitar Gently Weeps: The Music of George Harrison, Hal Leonard (Milwaukee, WI, 2006; ISBN 1-4234-0609-5).
- Chip Madinger & Mark Easter, Eight Arms to Hold You: The Solo Beatles Compendium, 44.1 Productions (Chesterfield, MO, 2000; ISBN 0-615-11724-4).
- Robert Rodriguez, Fab Four FAQ 2.0: The Beatles' Solo Years, 1970–1980, Backbeat Books (Milwaukee, WI, 2010; ISBN 978-1-4165-9093-4).
- Nicholas Schaffner, The Beatles Forever, McGraw-Hill (New York, NY, 1978; ISBN 0-07-055087-5).
- Michael Simmons, "Cry for a Shadow", Mojo, November 2011, pp. 74–87.
- Mat Snow, The Beatles Solo: The Illustrated Chronicles of John, Paul, George, and Ringo After The Beatles (Volume 3: George), Race Point Publishing (New York, NY, 2013; ISBN 978-1-937994-26-6).
- Bob Woffinden, The Beatles Apart, Proteus (London, 1981; ISBN 0-906071-89-5).
