= It Doesn't Matter Anymore =

1959 single by Buddy Holly

Single by Buddy Holly

from the album The Buddy Holly Story
- B-side: "Raining in My Heart"
- Released: January 5, 1959
- Recorded: October 21, 1958
- Studio: Decca (New York City)
- Genre: Pop
- Length: 2:01
- Label: Coral 9-62074
- Songwriter: Paul Anka

Buddy Holly singles chronology
"Heartbeat" (1958)	"It Doesn't Matter Anymore" (1959)	"Peggy Sue Got Married" (1959)

"It Doesn't Matter Anymore" is a pop ballad written by Paul Anka and recorded by Buddy Holly in 1958. The song was issued in January 1959, less than a month before Holly's death. "It Doesn't Matter Anymore" reached number 13 as a posthumous hit on the Billboard Hot 100 chart in early 1959, shortly after Holly was killed in a plane crash on February 3, 1959.

The single was a two-sided hit, backed with "Raining in My Heart". "It Doesn't Matter Anymore" was Holly's last US Top 20 hit and featured the orchestral backing of Dick Jacobs. It was also successful in the United Kingdom, where it became the country's first posthumous number 1 hit.

The song was recorded in mid-October 1958 at Decca's recording studio in the Pythian Temple in New York City. Paul Anka wrote it specifically for Holly. He donated his royalties from the song to Holly's wife. He said: "'It Doesn't Matter Anymore' has a tragic irony about it now, but at least it will help look after Buddy Holly's family. I'm giving my composer's royalty to his widow - it's the least I can do".

The song has been covered many times by artists like Linda Ronstadt in 1974, and by New Zealand-born singer-songwriter Mark Williams in 1977, who had a number-one hit with it in New Zealand.

== Track listing ==
1. "It Doesn't Matter Anymore" (2:01)
2. "Raining in My Heart" (2:45)

== Chart performance ==
In the United Kingdom the song reached number 1 on April 24, 1959, and remained in that position for three weeks, becoming the first posthumous number 1 hit in UK chart history. Holly would continue to achieve posthumous chart success in the UK well into the 1960s. In the United States it reached number 13 on the Billboard Hot 100 chart. It was Holly's last Top 20 hit in the United States. Internationally, the song reached number 1 in both Canada and Ireland, and also peaked at number 2 in the Australian charts.

=== Weekly charts ===
Chart (1959)	Peak position
Australia (Kent Music Report)	2
Canada 1050 chum Chum Chart Archives	1
Ireland (IRMA)	1
UK (The Official Charts Company)	1
U.S. Billboard Hot 100	13
U.S. Cash Box Top 100	30

=== Year-end charts ===
Chart (1959)	Rank
U.S. (Joel Whitburn's Pop Annual)	112

== Linda Ronstadt version ==
"It Doesn't Matter Anymore"

Single by Linda Ronstadt

from the album Heart Like a Wheel
- A-side: "When Will I Be Loved"
- Released: March 25, 1975
- Genre: Country
- Label: Capitol
- Songwriter: Paul Anka

Linda Ronstadt singles chronology
"You're No Good" (1974)	"It Doesn't Matter Anymore" (1975)	"Heat Wave" (1975)

Linda Ronstadt covered "It Doesn't Matter Anymore" in 1974 on her multi-platinum album Heart Like a Wheel. As the B-side of "When Will I Be Loved," it became a double-sided hit in the United States. The single reached number 20 on the Billboard Adult Contemporary chart, number 47 on the Pop chart, and number 54 on the Country chart in the fall of 1975.

=== Chart history ===
Chart (1975)	Peak position
Canada RPM Top Singles	83
Canada RPM Adult Contemporary	18
U.S. Billboard Hot 100	47
U.S. Billboard Adult Contemporary	20
U.S. Billboard Country	54
U.S. Cash Box Top 100	80

== Mark Williams' version ==
"It Doesn't Matter Anymore"

Single by Mark Williams

from the album Taking It All In Stride
- B-side: "True Love (Is Never Easy)"
- Released: April 1977
- Recorded: 1977
- Studio: EMI Studios, Wellington, New Zealand
- Genre: Pop; funk; soul
- Length: 2:42
- Label: EMI Music
- Songwriter: Paul Anka
- Producer: Alan Galbraith

Mark Williams singles chronology
"Taking It All in Stride" (1976)	"It Doesn't Matter Anymore" (1977)	"A House for Sale" (1977)

"It Doesn't Matter Anymore" was covered by New Zealand-born singer songwriter, Mark Williams. The song was released in April 1977 as the second single from his third studio album, Taking It All In Stride (1977). The song peaked at number 1 on the New Zealand charts and was the highest selling single by a New Zealand artist in New Zealand in 1977.

=== Track listing ===
7" single (EMI – HR 566)

Side A: "It Doesn't Matter Anymore"
Side B: "True Love (Is Never Easy)"

=== Chart performance ===
==== Weekly charts ====
Chart (1977)	Peak position
New Zealand (Recorded Music NZ)	1

=== Year-end charts ===
Chart (1977)	Rank
New Zealand (Recorded Music NZ)	6
New Zealand Artist (Recorded Music NZ)	1

== See also ==
- List of number-one singles from the 1950s (UK)
- List of posthumous number-one singles (UK)
- List of number-one singles in 1977 (New Zealand)
- New Zealand Top 50 singles of 1977
