= Mark Williams (album) =

Studio album by Mark Williams
- Released: June 1975
- Recorded: May 1974–March 1975
- Studio: EMI Studios, Wellington, New Zealand
- Genre: Pop; rock
- Label: EMI Music
- Producer: Alan Galbraith

Mark Williams chronology
| Mark Williams (1975) | Sweet Trials (1976) |

Singles from Mark Williams
- 1. "Celebration" Released: 1974; 2. "Yesterday Was Just the Beginning of My Life" Released: May 1975

Mark Williams is the self-titled debut studio album by New Zealand-born singer Mark Williams. It was released in June 1975 a year after being signed to EMI Music by Alan Galbraith. The album peaked at number 2 on the Official New Zealand Music Chart, remaining on the charts for 30 weeks. It was the highest selling album by a New Zealand artist in New Zealand in 1975.

== Reception ==
Suedo Nim from Victoria University of Wellington said "Mark Williams' debut album.. deserved its kudos. The brilliant combination of pop-soul, the sheer panache of tracks like "Love the One You're With" and "Ain't No Sunshine" made it a classy production."

== Track listing ==
LP/Cassette (HSD 1040)

Side A
| No. | Title | Writer(s) | Length |
|---|---|---|---|
| 1. | "Gimme Little Sign" | Alfred Smith, Joe Hooven, Jerry Winn | 2:50 |
| 2. | "Get on the Right Road" | Garry Wright | 3:00 |
| 3. | "Celebration" | Ashton, Lord | 3:32 |
| 4. | "Love the One You're With" | Stephen Stills | 3:30 |
| 5. | "Let Love Come Between Us" | Joe Sobotka, Johnny Wyker | 2:20 |
| 6. | "Disco Queen" | Errol Brown, Tony Wilson | 3:45 |

Side B
| No. | Title | Writer(s) | Length |
|---|---|---|---|
| 1. | "Sail On White Moon" | Johnny Bristol | 2:56 |
| 2. | "Ain't No Sunshine" | Bill Withers | 2:20 |
| 3. | "Wailing Wall" | Todd Rundgren | 2:54 |
| 4. | "Jimmy Loves Marianne" | | 3:10 |
| 5. | "Yesterday Was Just the Beginning of My Life" | Vanda & Young | 3:54 |
| 6. | "A Perfect Love" | Paul Williams | 2:08 |

== Charts ==
=== Weekly charts ===
| Chart (1975/76) | Peak position |
|---|---|
| New Zealand Albums (RMNZ) | 2 |

=== Year-end charts ===
| Chart (1975) | Rank |
|---|---|
| New Zealand Albums (RIANZ) | 17 |
| New Zealand Albums (RIANZ) | 1 |
