= If It Rains =

Single by Mark Williams

from the album Sweet Trials
- B-side: "Morning Sun Upon a Mountain"
- Released: April 1976
- Recorded: 1975
- Studio: EMI Studios, Wellington, New Zealand
- Genre: Pop; funk; soul
- Length: 3:10
- Label: EMI Music
- Songwriter(s): Kiki Dee
- Producer(s): Alan Galbraith

Mark Williams singles chronology
"Sweet Wine" (1975)	"If It Rains" (1976)	"Taking It All in Stride" (1976)

"If It Rains" is a song written by Kiki Dee and recorded by New Zealand-born singer songwriter, Mark Williams. The song was released in April 1976 as the second and final single from his second studio album, Sweet Trials (1976). The song peaked at number 25 on the New Zealand charts.

== Reception ==
In an album review from Victoria University of Wellington by Suedo Nim, Nim said; "Kiki Dee's "If It Rains", one of the three foreign tracks on the album, is performed convincingly with strong vocal backings."

== Track listing ==
7" single (EMI – HR 550)

Side A: "If It Rains"
Side B: "Morning Sun Upon a Mountain"

== Chart performance ==
Chart (1976)	Peak position
New Zealand (Recorded Music NZ)	25
