= A House for Sale =

Single by Mark Williams

from the album Taking It All In Stride
- B-side: "Love Is Forever"
- Released: August 1977
- Recorded: 1976/77
- Studio: EMI Studios, Wellington, New Zealand
- Genre: Pop; funk; soul
- Length: 4:02
- Label: EMI Music
- Songwriter(s): Carl Hampton Homer Banks
- Producer(s): Alan Galbraith

Mark Williams singles chronology
"It Doesn't Matter Anymore" (1977)	"A House for Sale" (1977)	"Wanna Give You My Love" (1978)

"A House for Sale" is a song written by Carl Hampton and Homer Banks and recorded by New Zealand-born singer songwriter, Mark Williams. The song was released in August 1977 as the third and final single from his third studio album, Taking It All In Stride (1977). The song peaked at number 13 on the New Zealand charts.

== Track listing ==
7" single (EMI – HR 571)

Side A: "A House for Sale"
Side B: "Love Is Forever"

== Chart performance ==
Chart (1977)	Peak position
New Zealand (Recorded Music NZ)	13
