= How Much Love (Leo Sayer song) =

Single by Leo Sayer

from the album Endless Flight
- B-side: "I Hear the Laughter"
- Released: March 1977
- Genre: Disco
- Length: 3:38
- Label: Warner Brothers
- Songwriters: Barry Mann and Leo Sayer
- Producer: Richard Perry

Leo Sayer singles chronology
"When I Need You" (1977)	"How Much Love" (1977)	"Thunder In My Heart" (1977)

Music Video
- "How Much Love" on YouTube

"How Much Love" is a popular song from 1977 by the British singer Leo Sayer, who co-wrote the song with Barry Mann. It was the third of three single releases from Sayer's 1976 album, Endless Flight.

The song became an international Top 10 hit. Although it reached only number 17 on the U.S. Billboard Hot 100, it hit number 9 on the U.S. Cashbox Top 100, and number 10 in the UK. It was a bigger hit in Canada, where it peaked at number 4 and was the 57th biggest hit of 1977. It also reached the Top 10 on the Canadian AC chart.

Chicago radio station WLS, which gave "How Much Love" airplay, ranked the song as the 62nd biggest hit of 1977. It reached as high as number 5 on their weekly singles survey.

== Personnel ==
- Leo Sayer - vocals
- Gene Page - string arrangements
- Larry Carlton - rhythm guitar
- Chuck Rainey - bass
- Richard Tee - piano
- Steve Gadd - drums
- Ray Parker Jr. - lead guitar
- Bobbye Hall - percussion

== Chart performance ==
=== Weekly charts ===
Chart (1977)	Peak position
Australia	18
Canadian RPM Top Singles	4
Canadian RPM Adult Contemporary	8
Ireland	4
New Zealand	10
Switzerland (Sonntagsblick Hitparade)	18
UK Singles Chart	10
US Billboard Hot 100	17
US Billboard Adult Contemporary	27
US Cash Box Top 100	9
West Germany (GfK)	21

=== Year-end charts ===
Chart (1977)	Rank
Canada	57
New Zealand	48
US Billboard Hot 100	98
US Cash Box Top 100	97

== Cover version ==
"How Much Love" was covered by Maxine Nightingale on her 1977 LP Night Life. It was also included as the B-side of one of the singles from the LP.
