= Taking It All in Stride (song) =

Single by Mark Williams

from the album Taking It All In Stride
- B-side: "Why Can't We Be Lovers"
- Released: November 1976
- Recorded: 1976
- Studio: EMI Studios, Wellington, New Zealand
- Genre: Pop; funk; soul
- Length: 4:23
- Label: EMI Music
- Songwriter(s): Tom Snow
- Producer(s): Alan Galbraith

Mark Williams singles chronology
"If It Rains" (1976)	"Taking It All in Stride" (1976)	"It Doesn't Matter Anymore" (1977)

"Taking It All in Stride" is a song written by Tom Snow and recorded by New Zealand-born singer songwriter, Mark Williams. The song was released in November 1976 as the lead single from his third studio album, Taking It All In Stride (1977). The song peaked at number 14 on the New Zealand charts.

== Track listing ==
7" single (EMI – HR 557)

Side A: "Taking It All in Stride"
Side B: "Why Can't We Be Lovers"

== Chart performance ==
Chart (1977)	Peak position
New Zealand (Recorded Music NZ)	14
