= Sweet Wine =

Single by Mark Williams

from the album Sweet Trials
- B-side: "Who Do You Think You Are"
- Released: October 1975
- Recorded: 1975
- Studio: EMI Studios, Wellington, New Zealand
- Genre: Pop; funk; soul
- Length: 3:13
- Label: EMI Music
- Songwriter: Reece Kirk
- Producer: Alan Galbraith

Mark Williams singles chronology
"Yesterday Was Just the Beginning of My Life" (1975)	"Sweet Wine" (1975)	"If It Rains" (1976)

"Sweet Wine" is a song written by Reece Kirk and recorded by New Zealand-born singer songwriter, Mark Williams. The song was released in October 1975 as the lead single from his second studio album, Sweet Trials (1976). The song peaked at number 7 on the New Zealand charts.

== Reception ==
In an album review from Victoria University of Wellington by Suedo Nim, Nim said; "Reece Kirk's "Sweet Wine" is the only local song that draws significant attention and is at least memorable. Although it had a lot of airplay and wasn't very well received as a single, "Sweet Wine" is a product of fresh original talent and unreservedly highlights the album. Only a few other songs do justice to Mark's soulful vocals."

== Track listing ==
7" single (EMI – HR 546)

Side A: "Sweet Wine"
Side B: "Who Do You Think You Are"

== Chart performance ==
Chart (1975/76)	Peak position
New Zealand (Recorded Music NZ)	7
