= Alan Galbraith (music producer) =

New Zealand record producer

Alan Galbraith (born c. 1947) was one of New Zealand's most successful record producers of the 1970s.

Galbraith was born in Luton, moving to Richmond in New Zealand's South Island as a child. In his teenage years and early 20s he was a member of several bands, notably Sounds Unlimited, with whom he travelled briefly to the United Kingdom in 1967.

In 1968, he was hospitalised for several months with a kidney infection, and while convalescing decided that he was more suited to work behind the scenes as a record producer. He worked his way through several minor jobs at His Master's Voice before being offered an assistant producer's role in 1970, working alongside New Zealand's then top producer, Peter Dawkins. Galbraith soon found the working conditions at His Master's Voice to be stifling, and in 1972 he left for Britain, where he was soon hired by EMI. He returned to New Zealand in 1973, where he became a producer for EMI (NZ).

Galbraith's big breakthrough came in 1974, when he signed Space Waltz to EMI. Their debut single, "Out on the Street", produced by Galbraith, became a big domestic hit, and an album, also produced by Galbraith, soon followed. From this beginning, Galbraith started to change the approach of EMI's New Zealand recording set-up. Inspired by the Motown sound, Galbraith encouraged a collegiate approach from a variety of artists, each working as backing musicians on each other's recordings. Artists who worked in this way included The Yandall Sisters, Mark Williams, and Lew Pryme, alongside Space Waltz's Alastair Riddell.

Mark Williams, in particular, was to become a household name in New Zealand with the help of Galbraith, who was by now working as both music producer and manager. Galbraith produced a trio of albums for him, all of which performed well. Galbraith also signed the band Rockinghorse and Nelson singer Sharon O'Neill, the latter of whom also went on to considerable success.

In 1977, Galbraith was invited by Dawkins to join him at CBS in Australia, where he worked for some time before moving back to New Zealand. He joined the staff at WEA in 1980, and was responsible for the company signing Herbs in 1988. Shortly afterwards, he retired from the business.

Throughout Galbraith's career, he continued recording his own music on a part-time basis, and has also done so since retirement. He lives with his wife, Sue. He has two adult children, and three grandchildren. During his latter years he has also become a luthier, making his own guitars. He now lives in Greytown.

== Awards ==
Galbraith was named Producer of the Year at both the 1975 and 1976 RATA Music Awards.
