= Mark Williams (singer) =

New Zealand-born singer

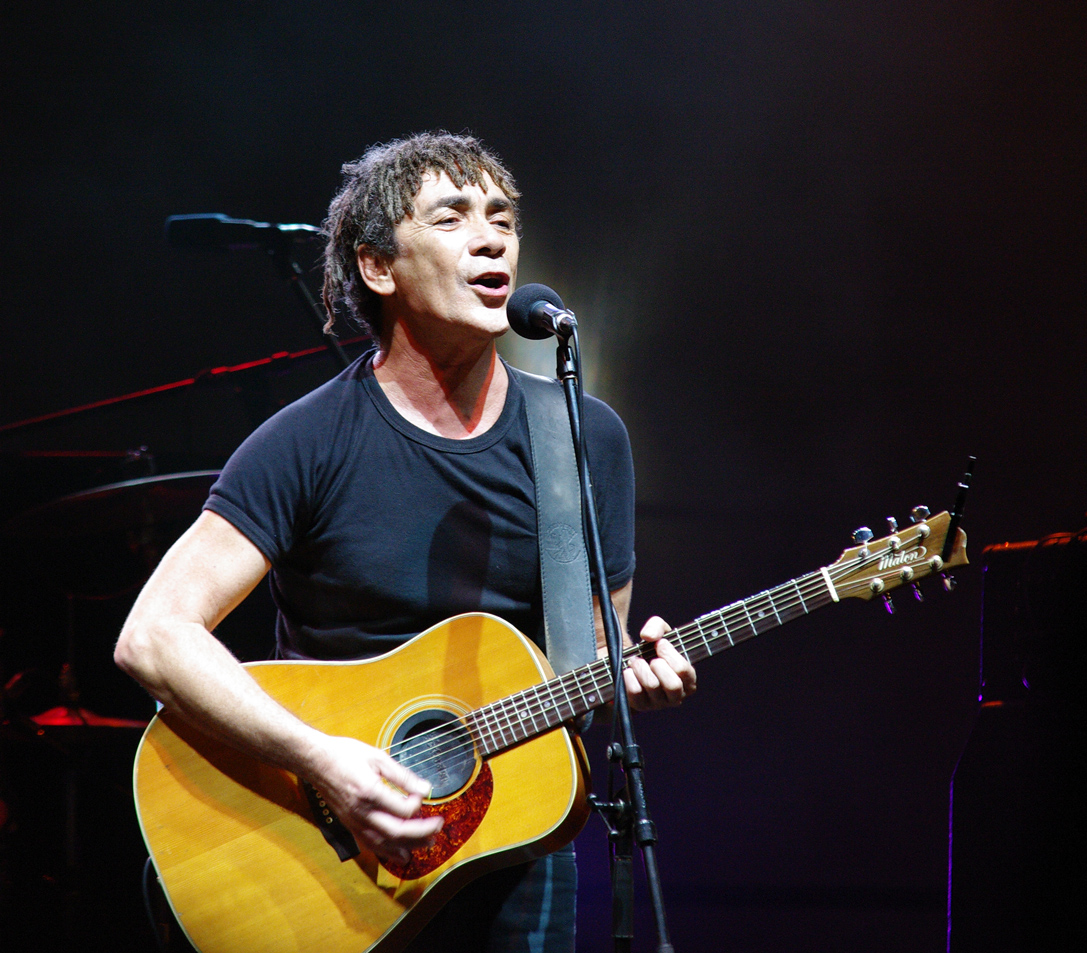
- Williams performing with Dragon in 2009

Background information
- Born: Te Kopuru, New Zealand
- Origin: Dargaville, New Zealand
- Genres: Rock; pop; soul
- Years active: 1970–present
- Labels: EMI Music; Albert Productions; CBS Records; Laneway Music
- Member of: Dragon
- Formerly of: The Face, Boy Rocking
- Website: http://www.markwilliamsmusic.com

Mark Williams (born 1953/54) is a New Zealand singer with Recording Industry Association of New Zealand (RIANZ) number one hit singles, "Yesterday Was Just the Beginning of My Life" (1975) and a cover of Buddy Holly's "It Doesn't Matter Anymore" (1977) before he relocated to Australia later that year. His single, "Show No Mercy" (1990) was a top ten hit in both countries. He has undertaken extensive touring in support of numerous Australian bands and worked in television. In 2006 he became the vocalist for the reformed New Zealand band, Dragon.

== Biography ==
=== Early years ===
Williams was born in Te Kopuru, in the Northland region of New Zealand. At the age of 16 he joined a band called 'Face' with classmates. In September 1970, The Face went on to win the Northland heat of the National Battle of the Bands competition, and finishing third overall in the national grand final held in Auckland. In 1971, Face headed to Auckland where they got a gig at the Ōtāhuhu Community Centre paying $20 a week. The other members of Face were Willie Hona, Mack Tane and Gregg Findlay.

Lew Pryme of Impact Records was one of the judges in the competition and became their manager. The band were signed to Zodiac Records and released the single "Hangin' Around"/"Mr Postman". A national tour followed.

When the television show Happen Inn finished in 1973, it was replaced by Free Ride, hosted by Ray Columbus. In 1974 Pryme convinced Williams to leave Face (at the time featuring John Parker on guitar, Mark Fitt on bass and Paul Dunningham on drums) to pursue a solo career as Free Ride was being launched. After a national tour, Williams finally departed from "Face" in September 1974. Williams was well suited for the television role, which allowed him to perform in front of a national audience, gaining exposure. Late in 1974, Williams was signed to EMI Music by Alan Galbraith.

=== 1974–1977: New Zealand fame ===
Late in 1974, Williams released his debut solo single, "Celebration"/"Let Love Come Between Us", but failed to chart. In May 1975, Williams released a song written by Vanda & Young titled "Yesterday Was Just the Beginning of My Life". The song peaked at number 1 on the New Zealand Charts for 3 weeks. The fame stunned the young singer and Williams said "I didn't feel like I was ready for anything. There was constant touring, television, and recording, it was full on." Williams' debut self-titled album was released in June and peaked at number 2. The album was certified gold.

In November 1975, Williams released "Sweet Wine" which peaked at number 7 on the charts. Early in 1976, Lew Pryme took Williams on a promotional visit to Australia. Upon their return to New Zealand, Pryme and Williams parted company. Williams' second album Sweet Trials was released in March 1976 and peaked at number 14. "If It Rains" was released and peaked at number 25.

Late in 1976 the single "Taking It All in Stride" was released and peaked at number 14. Williams' third album, Taking It All In Stride was released in June 1977 and was certified gold. It contained the single "It Doesn't Matter Anymore" which reached number one, giving Williams his second chart topper. "A House for Sale" was released as the third and final single late in 1977, peaking at number 13.

=== 1978–1989: Australia and Life After Dark ===
By the end of 1977, Williams left New Zealand for Australia. Williams had found being a 'star' in New Zealand was not all fun. He said "The reaction was either absolute adoration or total disgust. Complete opposites. I was very scared of what it created. That's one of the reasons I left New Zealand, because it was just too scary."

Record producer Alan Galbraith became the new manager of Williams who signed with CBS Records in Australia. He released the album Life After Dark in 1979, which failed to chart.

During the 1980s, Williams established himself as a session singer in Sydney singing many radio and TV commercials and become a favoured back up vocalist on albums by major Australian talent including; Eurogliders' Absolutely, The Church's Heyday, Renée Geyer's Live at the Basement and Jenny Morris's Body and Soul. In 1985, Williams formed a band called 'Boy Rocking' with Harry Brus and Mark Punch. The group were signed to CBS and released two singles without success. In 1987, Williams recorded the "Home and Away" theme song with Karen Boddington, which was released as a single in 1988. In 1988, Williams toured with Ian Moss on the hugely successful 'Matchbook' tour.

=== 1990–2005: Australian fame and Mark Williams ZNZ ===
In 1989, Williams attempted to re-launch his music career and signed to Albert Productions.

He began working on new material with Harry Vanda and George Young of The Easybeats. In May 1990, Williams released "Show No Mercy" which peaked within the top ten in Australia and New Zealand. "Show No Mercy" was certified ARIA platinum certification in Australia, and was chosen to launch the 1990 New South Wales Rugby League grand final. The second single "Fix of Love" peaked at number 28 in Australia and Williams released his fifth studio album, Mark Williams ZNZ in August 1990.

Williams recorded and released his sixth studio album, Mind over Matter in 1992, with none of the three singles released making the top 50. In 1993, Williams recorded a cover of "Time After Time" with Tara Morice for the Strictly Ballroom soundtrack.

In 1995 he starred in Graham Murphy's dance show Fornicon and featured on its soundtrack release.

In 1999, EMI Music released another greatest hits compilation titled, The Very Best Of. Between 1999 and 2000, Williams worked as a vocal coach on the Australian Popstars series on the Seven Network, including the female pop group Bardot.

=== 2006–present: Dragon and ROCKONZ Hall of Fame ===
In 2006, Williams was asked by Todd Hunter of the New Zealand rock band Dragon to join. In a 2013 interview, Williams recalls "Todd [Hunter] gave me a call out of the blue, flew me over, sat me at the kitchen table and said 'Hey, wanna join a rock and roll band?'". Williams said he agreed instantly. Since 2006, The band has toured Australia and New Zealand and has released four studio albums and two extended plays.

In 2010, Williams was inducted into the ROCKONZ Hall of Fame.

In 2024, Mark supported the Australian leg of the Boney M Farewell Tour.

== Discography ==
=== Studio albums ===
List of studio albums, with selected details and chart positions
Title	Details	Peak chart positions	
Title	Details	NZ	AUS
Mark Williams	Released: June 1975; Label: EMI Music; Catalogue: HSD 1040	2	—
Sweet Trials	Released: March 1976; Label: EMI Music; Catalogue: HSD 1046	14	—
Taking It All In Stride	Released: June 1977; Label: EMI Music; Catalogue: HSD 1055	14	—
Life After Dark	Label: CBS; Catalogue: SBP 237330	—	—
Mark Williams ZNZ	Released: August 1990; Label: CBS/Albert Productions; Catalogue: 466609	—	45
Mind over Matter	Released: April 1993; Label: Albert Productions; Catalogue: 472211	—	133
"—" denotes a recording that did not chart or was not released in that territory.

=== Soundtracks ===
List of soundtracks, with selected details
Title	Details
Dancing Daze (by Jenny Morris, Wendy Matthews, Mark Williams, Marc Hunter & Jane Clifton)	Released: February 1986; Formats: LP, Cassette; Label: ABC Music (RML 53191)
Illusion (by Mark Williams, Wendy Matthews, Martin Armiger & Peter Blakeley)	Released: 1986; Label: ABC Music (L 38529); Formats: LP
Fornicon (by Martin Armiger featuring Mark Williams)	Released: 1995; Label: Wild Sound (OST 001); Formats: CD

=== Live albums ===
List of live albums, with selected details
Title	Details
Live in New Zealand '75	Released: 30 July 2016; Label: Laneway Music

=== Compilations ===
List of compilations, with selected details
Title	Details
Greatest Hits	Released: Late 1977; Label: EMI Music; Catalogue: HSD 1064
The Very Best of Mark Williams album	Released: 1999; Label: EMI Music; Catalogue: 5233472
The Singles Collection	Released: 30 July 2016; Label: Laneway Music

=== Singles ===
List of singles, with selected chart positions
Title	Year	Peak chart positions			Album
Title	Year	NZ	AUS	UK	Album
"Celebration"	1974	—	—	—	Mark Williams
"Yesterday Was Just the Beginning of My Life"	1975	1	—	—	Mark Williams
"Sweet Wine"	1975	7	—	—	Sweet Trials
"If It Rains"	1976	25	—	—	Sweet Trials
"Taking It All in Stride"	1976	14	—	—	Taking It All In Stride
"It Doesn't Matter Anymore"	1977	1	—	—	Taking It All In Stride
"A House for Sale"	1977	13	—	—	Taking It All In Stride
"Wanna Give You My Love"	1978	—	—	—	Life After Dark
"I Don't Want You Anymore"	1979	—	—	—	Life After Dark
"Throw Me a Line"	1980	—	—	—	Life After Dark
"Christmas Is a Lucky Time"	1985	—	—	—	Non-album single
"Might Have Been"(with Jenny Morris and Wendy Matthews)	1986	—	—	—	Dancing Daze (soundtrack)
"K.1.W.1." (with Malcolm McCallum)	1988	—	—	—	Non-album singles
"Home and Away" (as Mark Williams and Karen Boddington)	1989	—	171	73	Non-album singles
"Show No Mercy"	1990	9	8	—	Mark Williams ZNZ
"Fix of Love"	1990	—	28	—	Mark Williams ZNZ
"Spell Is Broken"	1991	—	115	—	Mark Williams ZNZ
"We Can Dream"	1992	—	95	—	Mind over Matter
"Time After Time" (as Mark Williams & Tara Morice)	1992	18	82	—	Strictly Ballroom
"Slow Dance"	1993	—	139	—	Mind over Matter
"I Can't Help You Anymore"	1993	—	—	—	Mind over Matter
"Feel for the Night" (German release)	1993	—	—	—	Mark Williams ZNZ
"—" denotes a recording that did not chart or was not released in that territory.

== Awards ==
=== New Zealand Music Awards ===
The New Zealand Music Awards are an annual awards night celebrating excellence in New Zealand music and have been presented annually since 1965.

Year	Nominee / work	Award	Result	Ref.
1975	Mark Williams	Artist of the Year	Won	
1975	Mark Williams	Male artist of the Year	Won	
1975	Alan Galbraith for "Yesterday Was Just the Beginning of My Life" by Mark Williams	Producer of the Year	Won	
1976	Mark Williams	Male artist of the Year	Won	
1976	Sweet Trials	Album of the Year	Nominated	
1976	David Frazer for "Taking It All in Stride" by Mark Williams	Arranger of the Year	Won	
1976	Peter Hitchcock for "Taking It All in Stride" by Mark Williams	Engineer of the Year	Won	
1976	Alan Galbraith for "Taking It All in Stride" by Mark Williams	Producer of the Year	Won	

=== ROCKONZ Hall of Fame ===
Year	Nominee / work	Award	Result	Ref.
2010	Mark Williams	ROCKONZ Hall of Fame	inducted	

=== Variety Artists Club of New Zealand ===
The Variety Artists Club of New Zealand (VAC) is a non-for-profit organisation and show business club. It was founded in 1966 and became an incorporated society in 1972. Each year the VAC presents prestigious awards to those involved with the entertainment industry.

Year	Nominee / work	Award	Result	Ref.
1975	Mark Williams	Golden Microphone for Performer of the Year	Won	
