= List of Billboard Hot 100 top-ten singles in 1977 =

This is a list of singles that have peaked in the Top 10 of the Billboard Hot 100 during 1977.

Fleetwood Mac scored four top ten hits during the year with "Go Your Own Way", "Dreams", "Don't Stop", and "You Make Loving Fun", the most among all other artists.

== Top-ten singles ==
- (#) – 1977 Year-end top 10 single position and rank

List of Billboard Hot 100 top ten singles which peaked in 1977
| Top ten entry date | Single | Artist(s) | Peak | Peak date | Weeks in top ten |
Singles from 1976
| December 4 | "You Don't Have to Be a Star (To Be in My Show)" | Marilyn McCoo and Billy Davis Jr. | 1 | January 8 | 8 |
| December 11 | "You Make Me Feel Like Dancing" | Leo Sayer | 1 | January 15 | 8 |
| December 25 | "I Wish" | Stevie Wonder | 1 | January 22 | 8 |
| December 25 | "Car Wash" | Rose Royce | 1 | January 29 | 9 |
| December 25 | "Dazz" | Brick | 3 | January 29 | 8 |
| December 25 | "After the Lovin'" | Engelbert Humperdinck | 8 | January 22 | 5 |
Singles from 1977
| January 8 | "Stand Tall" | Burton Cummings | 10 | January 8 | 2 |
| January 15 | "Hot Line" | The Sylvers | 5 | January 29 | 4 |
| January 22 | "Torn Between Two Lovers" (#10) | Mary MacGregor | 1 | February 5 | 10 |
| January 22 | "Blinded by the Light" | Manfred Mann's Earth Band | 1 | February 19 | 8 |
| January 22 | "New Kid in Town" | Eagles | 1 | February 26 | 7 |
| January 29 | "Evergreen (Love Theme from A Star Is Born)" (#4) | Barbra Streisand | 1 | March 5 | 13 |
| January 29 | "Walk This Way" | Aerosmith | 10 | January 29 | 2 |
| February 5 | "Enjoy Yourself" | The Jacksons | 6 | February 19 | 4 |
| February 12 | "I Like Dreamin'" (#6) | Kenny Nolan | 3 | March 12 | 7 |
| February 12 | "Lost Without Your Love" | Bread | 9 | February 19 | 2 |
| February 19 | "Fly Like an Eagle" | Steve Miller Band | 2 | March 12 | 6 |
| February 19 | "Night Moves" | Bob Seger & The Silver Bullet Band | 4 | March 12 | 6 |
| February 26 | "Dancing Queen" | ABBA | 1 | April 9 | 8 |
| February 26 | "Weekend in New England" | Barry Manilow | 10 | February 26 | 2 |
| March 5 | "Year of the Cat" | Al Stewart | 8 | March 5 | 2 |
| March 12 | "Rich Girl" | Hall & Oates | 1 | March 26 | 6 |
| March 12 | "Go Your Own Way" | Fleetwood Mac | 10 | March 12 | 2 |
| March 19 | "Don't Give Up on Us" | David Soul | 1 | April 16 | 7 |
| March 19 | "Don't Leave Me This Way" (#7) | Thelma Houston | 1 | April 23 | 8 |
| March 26 | "The Things We Do for Love" | 10cc | 5 | April 16 | 5 |
| April 2 | "Southern Nights" | Glen Campbell | 1 | April 30 | 8 |
| April 2 | "Hotel California" | Eagles | 1 | May 7 | 8 |
| April 2 | "I've Got Love on My Mind" | Natalie Cole | 5 | April 30 | 6 |
| April 2 | "Maybe I'm Amazed" | Wings | 10 | April 2 | 1 |
| April 9 | "So in to You" | Atlanta Rhythm Section | 7 | April 30 | 6 |
| April 23 | "When I Need You" | Leo Sayer | 1 | May 14 | 7 |
| April 23 | "Right Time of the Night" | Jennifer Warnes | 6 | May 7 | 4 |
| April 30 | "Sir Duke" | Stevie Wonder | 1 | May 21 | 8 |
| April 30 | "Tryin' to Love Two" | William Bell | 10 | April 30 | 1 |
| May 7 | "Couldn't Get It Right" | Climax Blues Band | 3 | May 21 | 6 |
| May 7 | "I Wanna Get Next to You" | Rose Royce | 10 | May 7 | 2 |
| May 14 | "I'm Your Boogie Man" | KC and the Sunshine Band | 1 | June 11 | 6 |
| May 14 | "Got to Give It Up" | Marvin Gaye | 1 | June 25 | 9 |
| May 21 | "Dreams" | Fleetwood Mac | 1 | June 18 | 7 |
| May 21 | "Gonna Fly Now" | Bill Conti | 1 | July 2 | 8 |
| May 21 | "Lucille" | Kenny Rogers | 5 | June 18 | 6 |
| May 28 | "Feels Like the First Time" | Foreigner | 4 | June 18 | 5 |
| May 28 | "Lonely Boy" | Andrew Gold | 7 | June 11 | 5 |
| June 11 | "Undercover Angel" (#9) | Alan O'Day | 1 | July 9 | 7 |
| June 18 | "Angel in Your Arms" (#5) | Hot | 6 | July 16 | 6 |
| June 25 | "Da Doo Ron Ron" | Shaun Cassidy | 1 | July 16 | 7 |
| June 25 | "Jet Airliner" | Steve Miller Band | 8 | July 9 | 4 |
| July 2 | "Looks Like We Made It" | Barry Manilow | 1 | July 23 | 5 |
| July 2 | "I Just Want to Be Your Everything" (#2) | Andy Gibb | 1 | July 30 | 16 |
| July 2 | "Margaritaville" | Jimmy Buffett | 8 | July 23 | 5 |
| July 9 | "My Heart Belongs to Me" | Barbra Streisand | 4 | July 30 | 6 |
| July 16 | "I'm in You" | Peter Frampton | 2 | July 30 | 6 |
| July 16 | "Do You Wanna Make Love" | Peter McCann | 5 | August 6 | 6 |
| July 23 | "Best of My Love" (#3) | The Emotions | 1 | August 20 | 12 |
| July 30 | "(Your Love Has Lifted Me) Higher and Higher" (#8) | Rita Coolidge | 2 | September 10 | 7 |
| July 30 | "Whatcha Gonna Do?" | Pablo Cruise | 6 | August 20 | 5 |
| August 6 | "Easy" | Commodores | 4 | August 27 | 6 |
| August 6 | "You and Me" | Alice Cooper | 9 | August 13 | 3 |
| August 13 | "You Made Me Believe in Magic" | Bay City Rollers | 10 | August 13 | 2 |
| August 20 | "Just a Song Before I Go" | Crosby, Stills & Nash | 7 | August 27 | 3 |
| August 27 | "Float On" | The Floaters | 2 | September 17 | 5 |
| August 27 | "Don't Stop" | Fleetwood Mac | 3 | September 24 | 6 |
| August 27 | "Handy Man" | James Taylor | 4 | September 10 | 4 |
| August 27 | "Strawberry Letter 23" | The Brothers Johnson | 5 | September 24 | 6 |
| September 3 | "Telephone Line" | Electric Light Orchestra | 7 | September 24 | 5 |
| September 10 | "Smoke from a Distant Fire" | Sanford-Townsend Band | 9 | September 17 | 2 |
| September 17 | "Keep It Comin' Love" | KC and the Sunshine Band | 2 | October 1 | 7 |
| September 17 | "Star Wars (Main Title)" | John Williams & London Symphony Orchestra | 10 | September 17 | 1 |
| September 24 | "Star Wars Theme/Cantina Band" | Meco | 1 | October 1 | 6 |
| September 24 | "That's Rock 'n' Roll" | Shaun Cassidy | 3 | October 22 | 7 |
| September 24 | "Cold as Ice" | Foreigner | 6 | October 22 | 5 |
| October 1 | "Nobody Does It Better" | Carly Simon | 2 | October 22 | 8 |
| October 8 | "You Light Up My Life" | Debby Boone | 1 | October 15 | 14 |
| October 8 | "Boogie Nights" | Heatwave | 2 | November 12 | 9 |
| October 8 | "Brick House" | Commodores | 5 | November 5 | 5 |
| October 15 | "I Feel Love" | Donna Summer | 6 | November 12 | 5 |
| October 22 | "Swayin' to the Music (Slow Dancing)" | Johnny Rivers | 10 | October 22 | 1 |
| October 29 | "Don't It Make My Brown Eyes Blue" | Crystal Gayle | 2 | November 26 | 10 |
| October 29 | "It's Ecstasy When You Lay Down Next to Me" | Barry White | 4 | November 12 | 5 |
| November 5 | "Baby, What a Big Surprise" | Chicago | 4 | December 3 | 6 |
| November 5 | "Heaven on the 7th Floor" | Paul Nicholas | 6 | November 26 | 6 |
| November 12 | "How Deep Is Your Love" | Bee Gees | 1 | December 24 | 17 |
| November 12 | "We're All Alone" | Rita Coolidge | 7 | November 26 | 6 |
| November 19 | "Blue Bayou" | Linda Ronstadt | 3 | December 17 | 8 |
| November 26 | "It's So Easy" | Linda Ronstadt | 5 | December 10 | 6 |
| December 3 | "(Every Time I Turn Around) Back in Love Again" | L.T.D. | 4 | December 24 | 7 |
| December 10 | "You Make Loving Fun" | Fleetwood Mac | 9 | December 17 | 2 |

=== 1976 peaks ===
List of Billboard Hot 100 top ten singles in 1977 which peaked in 1976
| Top ten entry date | Single | Artist(s) | Peak | Peak date | Weeks in top ten |
|---|---|---|---|---|---|
| November 6 | "Tonight's the Night" (#1) | Rod Stewart | 1 | November 13 | 11 |
| November 13 | "The Rubberband Man" | The Spinners | 2 | December 4 | 9 |
| November 27 | "More Than a Feeling" | Boston | 5 | December 25 | 6 |
| December 18 | "Sorry Seems to Be the Hardest Word" | Elton John | 6 | December 25 | 5 |

=== 1978 peaks ===
List of Billboard Hot 100 top ten singles in 1977 which peaked in 1978
| Top ten entry date | Single | Artist(s) | Peak | Peak date | Weeks in top ten |
|---|---|---|---|---|---|
| December 17 | "Baby Come Back" | Player | 1 | January 14 | 10 |
| December 17 | "Here You Come Again" | Dolly Parton | 3 | January 14 | 6 |
| December 24 | "Slip Slidin' Away" | Paul Simon | 5 | January 28 | 6 |
| December 24 | "Sentimental Lady" | Bob Welch | 8 | January 7 | 4 |

== See also ==
- 1977 in music
- List of Billboard Hot 100 number ones of 1977
- Billboard Year-End Hot 100 singles of 1977
