= Billboard Year-End Hot 100 singles of 1977 =

Ranking of recorded music

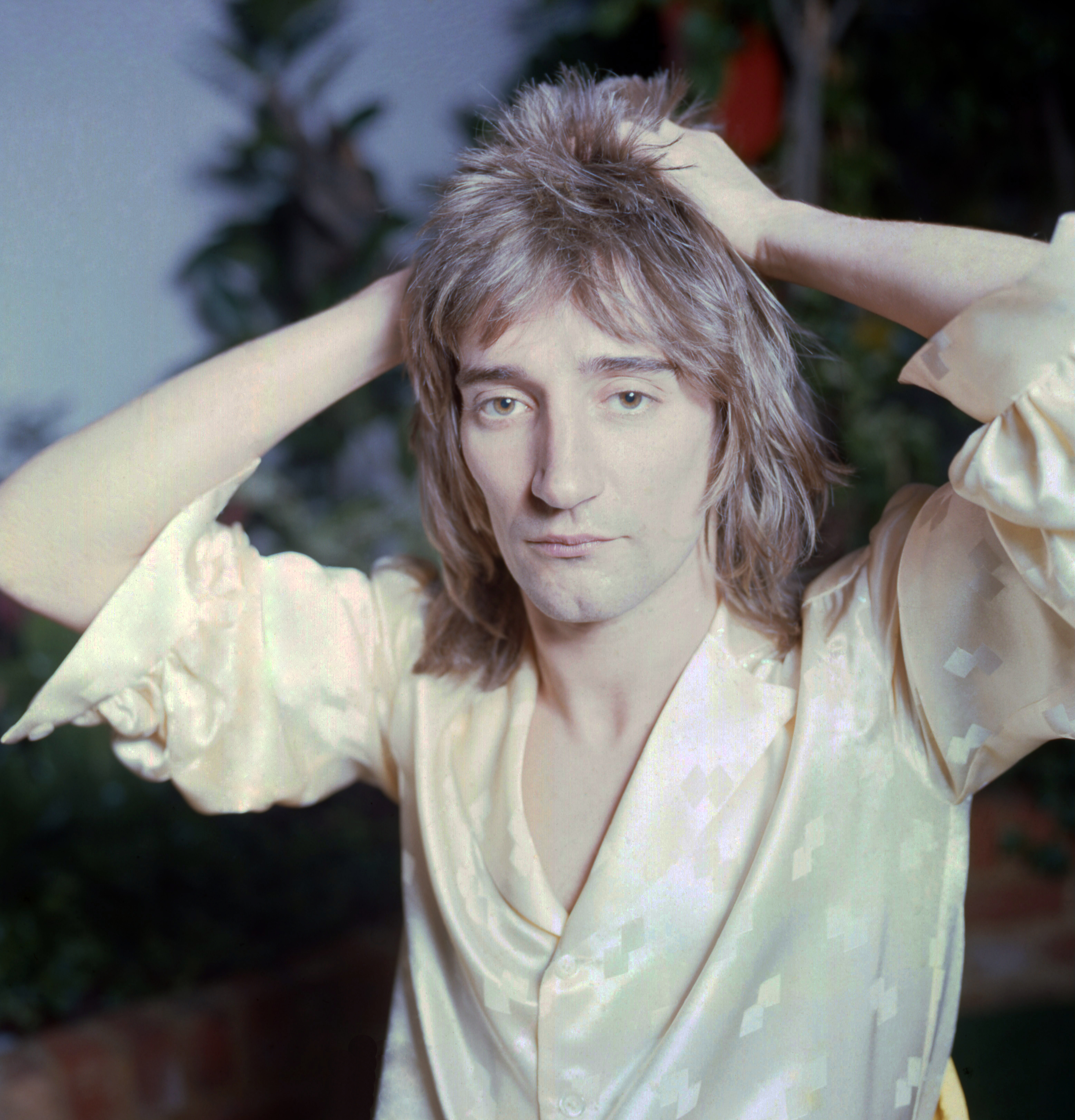
"Tonight's the Night (Gonna Be Alright)" by Rod Stewart was the number one song of 1977.

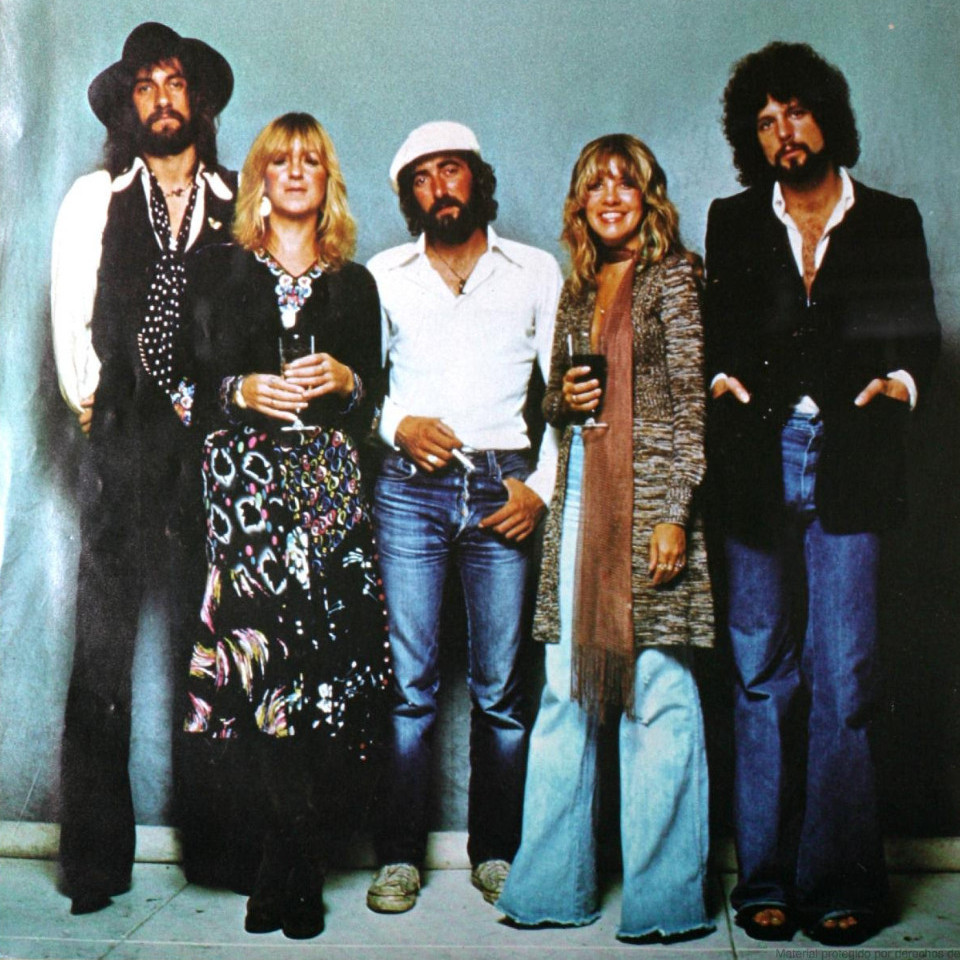
Three songs by Fleetwood Mac appear on the Year-End Hot 100.

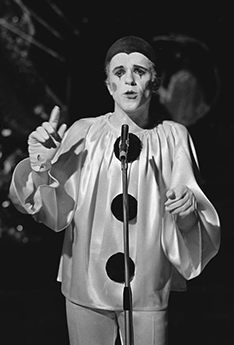
Three songs by Leo Sayer appear on the Year-End Hot 100.

This is a list of Billboard magazine's Top Hot 100 songs of 1977. The Top 100, as revealed in the year-end edition of Billboard dated December 24, 1977, is based on Hot 100 charts from the issue dates of November 6, 1976 through October 29, 1977.

No.	Title	Artist(s)
1	"Tonight's the Night (Gonna Be Alright)"	Rod Stewart
2	"I Just Want to Be Your Everything"	Andy Gibb
3	"Best of My Love"	The Emotions
4	"Evergreen (Love Theme from A Star Is Born)"	Barbra Streisand
5	"Angel in Your Arms"	Hot
6	"I Like Dreamin'"	Kenny Nolan
7	"Don't Leave Me This Way"	Thelma Houston
8	"(Your Love Has Lifted Me) Higher and Higher"	Rita Coolidge
9	"Undercover Angel"	Alan O'Day
10	"Torn Between Two Lovers"	Mary MacGregor
11	"I'm Your Boogie Man"	KC and the Sunshine Band
12	"Dancing Queen"	ABBA
13	"You Make Me Feel Like Dancing"	Leo Sayer
14	"Margaritaville"	Jimmy Buffett
15	"Telephone Line"	Electric Light Orchestra
16	"Whatcha Gonna Do?"	Pablo Cruise
17	"Do You Wanna Make Love"	Peter McCann
18	"Sir Duke"	Stevie Wonder
19	"Hotel California"	Eagles
20	"Got to Give It Up"	Marvin Gaye
21	"Gonna Fly Now"	Bill Conti
22	"Southern Nights"	Glen Campbell
23	"Rich Girl"	Hall & Oates
24	"When I Need You"	Leo Sayer
25	"Hot Line"	The Sylvers
26	"Car Wash"	Rose Royce
27	"You Don't Have to Be a Star (To Be in My Show)"	Marilyn McCoo & Billy Davis Jr.
28	"Fly Like an Eagle"	Steve Miller Band
29	"Don't Give Up on Us"	David Soul
30	"On and On"	Stephen Bishop
31	"Feels Like the First Time"	Foreigner
32	"Couldn't Get It Right"	Climax Blues Band
33	"Easy"	Commodores
34	"Right Time of the Night"	Jennifer Warnes
35	"I've Got Love on My Mind"	Natalie Cole
36	"Blinded by the Light"	Manfred Mann's Earth Band
37	"Looks Like We Made It"	Barry Manilow
38	"So in to You"	Atlanta Rhythm Section
39	"Dreams"	Fleetwood Mac
40	"Enjoy Yourself"	The Jacksons
41	"Dazz"	Brick
42	"I'm in You"	Peter Frampton
43	"Lucille"	Kenny Rogers
44	"The Things We Do for Love"	10cc
45	"Da Doo Ron Ron"	Shaun Cassidy
46	"Handy Man"	James Taylor
47	"Just a Song Before I Go"	Crosby, Stills & Nash
48	"You and Me"	Alice Cooper
49	"Swayin' to the Music (Slow Dancing)"	Johnny Rivers
50	"Lonely Boy"	Andrew Gold
51	"I Wish"	Stevie Wonder
52	"Don't Stop"	Fleetwood Mac
53	"Barracuda"	Heart
54	"Strawberry Letter 23"	The Brothers Johnson
55	"Night Moves"	Bob Seger & The Silver Bullet Band
56	"You're My World"	Helen Reddy
57	"Heard It in a Love Song"	The Marshall Tucker Band
58	"Carry On Wayward Son"	Kansas
59	"New Kid in Town"	Eagles
60	"My Heart Belongs to Me"	Barbra Streisand
61	"After the Lovin'"	Engelbert Humperdinck
62	"Jet Airliner"	Steve Miller Band
63	"Stand Tall"	Burton Cummings
64	"Way Down"	Elvis Presley
65	"Weekend in New England"	Barry Manilow
66	"It Was Almost Like a Song"	Ronnie Milsap
67	"Smoke from a Distant Fire"	Sanford-Townsend Band
68	"Cold as Ice"	Foreigner
69	"Ariel"	Dean Friedman
70	"Lost Without Your Love"	Bread
71	"Star Wars Theme/Cantina Band"	Meco
72	"Float On"	The Floaters
73	"Jeans On"	Lord David Dundas
74	"Lido Shuffle"	Boz Scaggs
75	"Keep It Comin' Love"	KC and the Sunshine Band
76	"You Made Me Believe in Magic"	Bay City Rollers
77	"Livin' Thing"	Electric Light Orchestra
78	"Give a Little Bit"	Supertramp
79	"That's Rock 'n' Roll"	Shaun Cassidy
80	"Love So Right"	Bee Gees
81	"The Rubberband Man"	The Spinners
82	"I Never Cry"	Alice Cooper
83	"Nobody Does It Better"	Carly Simon
84	"High School Dance"	The Sylvers
85	"Love's Grown Deep"	Kenny Nolan
86	"Ain't Gonna Bump No More (With No Big Fat Woman)"	Joe Tex
87	"I Wanna Get Next to You"	Rose Royce
88	"Somebody to Love"	Queen
89	"Muskrat Love"	Captain & Tennille
90	"Walk This Way"	Aerosmith
91	"Cherchez La Femme"	Dr. Buzzard's Original Savannah Band
92	"Year of the Cat"	Al Stewart
93	"Boogie Nights"	Heatwave
94	"Go Your Own Way"	Fleetwood Mac
95	"Sorry Seems to Be the Hardest Word"	Elton John
96	"Don't Worry Baby"	B.J. Thomas
97	"Knowing Me, Knowing You"	ABBA
98	"How Much Love"	Leo Sayer
99	"Star Wars (Main Title)"	London Symphony Orchestra
100	"Devil's Gun"	C.J. & Company

== See also ==
- 1977 in music
- Billboard Year-End Hot Soul Singles of 1977
- List of Billboard Hot 100 number-one singles of 1977
- List of Billboard Hot 100 top-ten singles in 1977
