= Best of Jennifer Warnes =

1982 compilation album by singer/songwriter Jennifer Warnes

Greatest hits album by Jennifer Warnes
- Released: September 1982
- Genre: Rock
- Length: 34:19
- Label: Arista
- Producer: Jim Ed Norman, Rob Fraboni, Jennifer Warnes, David Shire

Jennifer Warnes chronology
| Shot Through the Heart (1979) | Best of Jennifer Warnes (1982) | Famous Blue Raincoat (1987) |

Professional ratings
Review scores
| Source | Rating |
|---|---|
| AllMusic | 4.5/5 stars |

Best of Jennifer Warnes is a 1982 compilation album by singer/songwriter Jennifer Warnes comprising five of her six Billboard Hot 100 singles - including the Top 40 hits "Right Time of the Night" and "I Know a Heartache When I See One" - supplemented by four other tracks also recorded for Arista Records. In addition the album gave Warnes' recording of "It Goes Like It Goes" its first wide release.

Warnes had been recording tracks for her planned third Arista album at the Producers Workshop, reuniting with producer Jim Ed Norman who had overseen Warnes' 1977 Top Ten hit "Right Time of the Night", in the summer of 1981 with one track "Could It Be Love" issued as a single that June. However, the interference of Arista president Clive Davis in the matter of song choice ultimately caused the planned album's cancellation although a second track from the Producers Workshop sessions: "Come to Me" - a remake of a 1977 Juice Newton recording - was issued in April 1982.

Released in September 1982, Best of Jennifer Warnes featured the two single releases from Warnes' inaugural 1977 Arista album release Jennifer Warnes: "Right Time of the Night" and "I'm Dreaming", and also two of the three singles released from Warnes' 1979 follow-up album Shot Through the Heart: "I Know a Heartache When I See One" and "When the Feeling Comes Around", with that album's second single release "Don't Make Me Over" omitted in favor of two Warnes-composed album tracks: "I'm Restless" and "Shot Through the Heart", which had respectively served as B-side for "I Know a Heartache When I See One" and "When the Feeling Comes Around".

Best of Jennifer Warnes also marked the Arista release of "It Goes Like It Goes" which Warnes had recorded for the 1979 film Norma Rae: despite the song's earning the Academy Award for Best Original Song Warnes' recording had previously only been available in a single featured in the Norma Rae press kit. Also included in Best of Jennifer Warnes were three tracks from the sessions for her abandoned third Arista album: the singles "Could It Be Love" and "Come to Me" and the previously unreleased "Run to Her", Warnes' remake of the 1961 Bobby Vee hit "Run to Him".

By the time of the September 1982 release of Best of Jennifer Warnes the singer was no longer on the Arista Records roster, Warnes' post-Arista career already being well underway with the August 1982 release of "Up Where We Belong" Warnes' duet with Joe Cocker which Warnes correctly predicted would afford her a major hit single.

== Track listing ==
1. "Right Time of the Night" (Peter McCann) – 2:55
2. "It Goes Like It Goes" (David Shire, Norman Gimbel) – 2:53
3. "I Know a Heartache When I See One" (Rory Bourke, Kerry Chater, Charlie Black) – 3:30
4. "When the Feeling Comes Around" (Rick Cunha) – 3:18
5. "I'm Restless" (Jennifer Warnes) – 4:18
6. "Could It Be Love" (Randy Sharp) – 3:34
7. "Run To Her" (Jack Keller, Gerry Goffin) – 2:36
8. "I'm Dreaming" (Richard Kerr, Gary Osborne) – 3:34
9. "Shot Through the Heart" (Warnes) – 4:17
10. "Come To Me" (R. Gillman, C. Montan, R. Oppenheimer) – 3:24
