= Reba McEntire (album) =

Studio album by Reba McEntire
- Released: August 15, 1977
- Recorded: January 22, 1976 – April 13, 1977
- Studio: Woodland (Nashville, Tennessee); U.S. Recording (Nashville, Tennessee)
- Length: 31:30
- Label: Mercury
- Producer: Jerry Kennedy; Glenn Keener

Reba McEntire chronology
Reba McEntire (1977)	Out of a Dream (1979)

Singles from Reba McEntire
- 1. "I Don't Want to Be a One Night Stand" Released: April 1976; 2. "(There's Nothing Like the Love) Between a Woman and a Man" Released: January 1977; 3. "Glad I Waited Just for You" Released: July 1977

Reba McEntire is the debut studio album by American singer Reba McEntire. It was released on August 15, 1977, by Mercury Records. It features her first single "I Don't Want to Be a One Night Stand", as well as a cover of the Hot hit "Angel in Your Arms", the Patsy Cline hit "Why Can't He Be You", and the Jennifer Warnes hit "Right Time of the Night". Three of the album's singles cracked the Billboard Country charts, but the album was not a commercial success, failing to chart.

== Background and promotion ==
McEntire signed with Mercury Records in November 1975 under producer Glenn Keener, who recorded one song with her in January 1976 in Nashville, "I Don't Want to Be a One Night Stand". Keener laid a sophisticated production style on the song, with lush strings and vocal chorus. "I Don't Want to Be a One Night Stand" was released as a single, climbing the country charts in May 1976 to peak at number 88. Coincidentally, McEntire married in June, 1976 and graduated from college in December, 1976. Mercury fired Keener during a period of downsizing, and McEntire was shifted to producer Jerry Kennedy. Kennedy supervised further recording sessions in September 1976 and April 1977. The second single, "(There's Nothing like the Love) Between a Woman and a Man", peaked at number 86 in March 1977, and the third single, "Glad I Waited Just For You" charted at number 88 in August at the same time as the album was released. None of these singles nor the album provided McEntire with royalty income—her advances and the label's production expenses were greater than sales receipts. McEntire saw her first royalty payment from the album in 1988, years after she left Mercury.

Mercury Records released Reba McEntire on August 15, 1977, while the album was re-issued on CD and cassette tape in 1993 and released digitally in 2012.

== Critical reception ==
Professional ratings
Review scores
Source	Rating
AllMusic	4.5/5 stars

In a retrospective review, MusicHound criticized Reba McEntire, saying this was "the sad sound of a naive 22-year-old singer overwhelmed by clunky, reverb-heavy production that employs backing singers with the subtlety of the cavalry." AllMusic praised the album, writing that it "rewards" the listener, even though fans of McEntire's contemporary sound would likely consider it too old-fashioned.

== Track listing ==
Side one
No.	Title	Writer(s)	Recording date	Length
1.	"Glad I Waited Just for You"	Bucky Jones; Royce Porter	April 13, 1977	2:55
2.	"One to One"	Bill Rice; Jerry Foster	September 10, 1976	2:40
3.	"Angel in Your Arms"	Terry Woodford; Clayton Ivey; Tom Brasfield	April 13, 1977	2:51
4.	"I Don't Want to Be a One Night Stand"	Layng Martine Jr.	January 22, 1976	2:59
5.	"I've Waited All My Life for You"	Rice; Foster	September 16, 1976	2:59
6.	"I Was Glad to Give My Everything to You"	Ruby Hice; Danny Hice	September 16, 1976	2:10

Side two
No.	Title	Writer(s)	Recording date	Length
1.	"Take Your Love Away"	Randy Sharp	April 12, 1977	2:24
2.	"(There's Nothing like the Love) Between a Woman and a Man"	Hice; Hice	September 16, 1976	2:54
3.	"Why Can't He Be You"	Hank Cochran	April 12, 1977	3:34
4.	"Invitation to the Blues"	Roger Miller	April 13, 1977	3:27
5.	"Right Time of the Night"	Peter McCann	April 12, 1977	2:37

== Personnel ==
- Reba McEntire – lead and backing vocals
- Bobby Emmons – acoustic piano, organ
- Hargus "Pig" Robbins – acoustic piano, organ
- Tommy Allsup – guitar
- Harold Bradley – guitar
- Ray Edenton – guitar
- Leon Rhodes – guitar
- Pete Wade – guitar
- Chip Young – guitar
- Lloyd Green – steel guitar
- Weldon Myrick – steel guitar
- Bob Moore – bass
- Buddy Harman – drums, percussion
- Charlie McCoy - harmonica
- Johnny Gimble – fiddle
- Billy Puett – saxophone
- Bergen White – string and flute arrangements, backing vocals
- Byron Bach – strings
- Brenton Banks – strings
- George Binkley III – strings
- John Catchings – strings
- Marvin Chantry – strings
- Roy Christensen – strings
- Virginia Christensen – strings
- Carl Gorodetzky – strings
- Lennie Haight – strings
- Martin Katahn – strings
- Sheldon Kurland – strings
- Steven Maxwell Smith – strings
- Chris Teal – strings
- Gary Vanosdale – strings
- Stephanie Woolf – strings
- Janie Fricke – backing vocals
- Hoyt Hawkins – backing vocals
- Ginger Holladay – backing vocals
- Mary Holladay – backing vocals
- Prissy Hubbard – backing vocals
- The Jordanaires – backing vocals
- Millie Kirkham – backing vocals
- Neal Matthews – backing vocals
- Louis Dean Nunley – backing vocals
- Gordon Stoker – backing vocals
- Ray C. Walker – backing vocals
- Trish Williams – backing vocals

=== Production ===
- Jerry Kennedy – production (tracks 1–3, 5–11)
- Glenn Keener – production (track 4)
- Larry Maglinger – engineer
- Lynn Peterzell – engineer
- Tom Sparkman – engineer
- Cam Mullins – mixing
- Bergen White – mixing
- MC Rather – mastering
- Jim Schubert – artwork
- Jim McGuire – photography
