= Peter McCann (disambiguation) =

Peter McCann (1948–2023) was an American songwriter and musician.

Peter McCann may also refer to:

- Peter McCann (album), 1977
- Peter McCann (Australian footballer) (1882–1961), Australian rules footballer
- Peter McCann (footballer, born 1981), Northern Irish footballer
- Peter P. McCann, American philatelist

== See also ==
- Peter Macann, British actor, reporter, and television presenter
