= Shot Through the Heart =

Shot Through the Heart may refer to:

- Shot Through the Heart (film), a 1998 film
- Shot Through the Heart (album), by Jennifer Warnes, 1979
- "Shot Through the Heart", a song by Bon Jovi, on their 1984 album Bon Jovi
- "Shot Thru the Heart", song by Twice, on their 2018 EP Summer Nights

== See also ==
- "Schott Through the Heart", an episode of the TV series Supergirl
- Shot in the Heart, a memoir by Mikal Gilmore
- "You Give Love a Bad Name" by Bon Jovi, which has "shot through the heart" as the first line of its chorus
