= Fast Lanes and Country Roads =

Single by Barbara Mandrell

from the album Get to the Heart
- B-side: "You Only You"
- Released: November 25, 1985
- Genre: Country
- Length: 3:36
- Label: MCA
- Songwriter(s): Roger Murrah, Steve Dean
- Producer(s): Tom Collins

Barbara Mandrell singles chronology
"Angel in Your Arms" (1985)	"Fast Lanes and Country Roads" (1985)	"When You Get to the Heart" (1986)

"Fast Lanes and Country Roads" is a song written by Roger Murrah and Steve Dean, and recorded by American country music artist Barbara Mandrell. It was released in November 1985 as the second single from the album Get to the Heart. The song reached number 4 on the Billboard hot Country Singles & Tracks chart.

== Chart performance ==
Chart (1985–1986)	Peak position
US Hot Country Songs (Billboard)	4
Canadian RPM Country Tracks	2
