= Fairfield University Glee Club =

The Fairfield University Glee Club is a mixed chorus of about 60 undergraduate and graduate singers at Fairfield University in Fairfield, Connecticut. The Glee Club has performed in churches, schools and recital and concert halls throughout Europe, singing from Galway to Rome and Florence to London. The choir has performed at Carnegie Hall, the National Cathedral in Washington, D.C., Westminster Cathedral in London, the Aula Paolo VI at the Vatican and the U.S. military academies at West Point and Annapolis.

== Background ==
The Glee Club performs a varied repertoire of early, classical, and contemporary music in numerous engagements with other choruses, and with festival and symphonic Orchestras. The mixed chorus is the parent organization of three additional ensembles: the Chamber Singers; the Men's Ensemble, now known as the Bensonians; and Sweet Harmony.

=== Director ===
Carole Ann Maxwell, director of the Glee Club at Fairfield University, is one of America's preeminent conductors of collegiate, community, and professional choral ensembles. She also serves as the artistic director and conductor of the Mendelssohn Choir of Connecticut and the chorus master for Connecticut Grand Opera and Orchestra.

== History ==
The Fairfield University Glee Club, under the direction of Fr. John Murray S.J. and musical director Simon Harak became the first student organization formed by the first ever incoming class of Fairfield University in 1947.

=== European tours ===
Europe has been a recurring tour destination of the Glee Club since 1985. In 2000, the Glee Club made an eight-day singing tour of Europe making appearances at "the Church of the Immaculate Conception (the Jesuit church in London, England) for the evening mass; The Alla Grande at the University of Maastricht in Maastricht, Netherlands, a medieval city surrounded by stone walls; and The Cologne Cathedral in Kohn, Germany, where the Glee Club’s a cappella performance reverberated throughout the Gothic stone structure." In 2006, the choir sang its way through Italy during spring break, performing in Rome, Assisi, and Florence including singing a liturgy at Chiesa del Gesù and performing a concert at the residence of the Knights of Malta. And in 2008, the Glee Club toured Eastern Europe performing at the St. Ignatius Church in Prague, Czech Republic; the Minoritenkirche (Minorite Church) and the Church of the Assumption of the Blessed Virgin Mary in Vienna, Austria; and Waldorf School in Budapest, Hungary.

=== 60th anniversary ===
In celebration of its 60th anniversary in 2007, the Fairfield University Glee Club premiered a commissioned work, Songs to the Lord of Peace, by renowned American composer, Gwyneth Walker. The texts for these songs are taken from a series of "Freedom Songs" which Thomas Merton wrote in 1966. Michael A. Ciavaglia '04, a Fairfield University alumnus and Assistant Conductor of the New York Choral Society, conducted part of the 60th anniversary concert. The Glee Club also joined the Greater Bridgeport Symphony in a concert performance of Giacomo Puccini's Tosca.

== Notable alumni ==
- Peter McCann '70 - hit pop, rock, and country singer/songwriter for Jennifer Warnes, Whitney Houston, and more
- Kristen Record '99 - Presidential Award for Excellence in Mathematics and Science Teaching recipient; 2011 Connecticut Teacher of the Year
- Kim DiVine '02 - singer/songwriter; voice of Jell-O national TV campaign
- Tim Warren '03 - singer/songwriter for The Alternate Routes
- Brian Duprey - star of The Rat Pack is Back! at the Las Vegas Plaza Hotel & Casino; Frank Sinatra impersonator

=== Mendelssohn Choir of Connecticut ===
The Mendelssohn Choir was formed in 1984 by Fairfield University Chamber Singers members, who, upon their graduation, wished to continue a musical association under the baton of Dr. Carole Ann Maxwell. Since that time, The Mendelssohn Choir has grown to more than 100 members, chosen by audition, many of whom began singing with Dr. Maxwell while in college.
