= When You Get to the Heart =

Single by Barbara Mandrell with The Oak Ridge Boys

from the album Get to the Heart
- B-side: "Survivors"
- Released: March 29, 1986
- Genre: Country
- Length: 3:50
- Label: MCA
- Songwriters: Tony Brown, Wayland Holyfield, Norro Wilson
- Producer: Tom Collins

Barbara Mandrell singles chronology
"Fast Lanes and Country Roads" (1985)	"When You Get to the Heart" (1986)	"No One Mends a Broken Heart Like You" (1986)

The Oak Ridge Boys singles chronology
"Juliet" (1986)	"When You Get to the Heart" (1986)	"You Made a Rock of a Rolling Stone" (1986)

"When You Get to the Heart" is a song written by Tony Brown, Wayland Holyfield, and Norro Wilson, first recorded by The Oak Ridge Boys on their 1983 album Deliver. In 1985, Barbara Mandrell made it the title track of her album Get to the Heart, with The Oak Ridge Boys on backing vocals. It was released in March 1986 as the third single from her album.

== Chart performance ==
Chart (1986)	Peak position
US Hot Country Songs (Billboard)	20
Canadian RPM Country Tracks	33
