= She Reminded Me of You =

Single by Mickey Gilley

from the album Chasing Rainbows
- B-side: "Easy Climb"
- Released: October 29, 1988
- Genre: Country
- Length: 3:46
- Label: Airborne
- Songwriter(s): Peter McCann, Wayland Holyfield
- Producer(s): Larry Butler

Mickey Gilley singles chronology
"I'm Your Puppet" (1988)	"She Reminded Me of You" (1988)	"You Still Got a Way with My Heart" (1989)

"She Reminded Me of You" is a song recorded by American country music artist Mickey Gilley. It was released in October 1988 as the second single from the album Chasing Rainbows. The song reached number 23 on the Billboard Hot Country Singles & Tracks chart. The song was written by Peter McCann and Wayland Holyfield.

== Chart performance ==
Chart (1988)	Peak position
US Hot Country Songs (Billboard)	23
Canadian RPM Country Tracks	10
