= Kenny Nolan (album) =

Studio album by Kenny Nolan
- Released: 1977
- Recorded: 1976
- Genre: Soft rock, easy listening
- Length: 35:51
- Label: 20th Century
- Producer: Kenny Nolan and Charlie Calello

Kenny Nolan chronology
Kenny Nolan (1977)	A Song Between Us (1978)

Kenny Nolan is the debut album from singer-songwriter Kenny Nolan. It featured two U.S. top 20 hits, "I Like Dreamin'" and "Love's Grown Deep". Both songs did equally well or better in Canada. Another track, "My Eyes Get Blurry", reached No. 97 in the U.S.

The song, "Wakin' Up to Love", was recorded by Frankie Valli on his 1975 Closeup album, and also covered by Jimmy Dean in 1976 for his album, I.O.U.

== Track listing ==
All tracks are written by Kenny Nolan, except "Wakin' Up to Love" by Nolan and Bob Crewe.

- A1 "I Like Dreamin'" – 3:27
- A2 "My Jolé" – 2:49
- A3 "If You Ever Stopped Callin' Me Baby" – 4:08
- A4 "Time Ain't Time Enough" – 2:59
- A5 "My Eyes Get Blurry" – 3:57
- B1 "Love's Grown Deep" – 3:54
- B2 "Wakin' Up to Love" – 3:15
- B3 "Monette" – 2:50
- B4 "Today I Met the Girl I'm Gonna Marry" – 3:07
- B5 "My World Will Wait for You" – 5:25

== Personnel ==
=== Music ===
- Kenny Nolan – lead vocals
- Artwork by Alice Hall, Clyde Terry

== Charts ==
Chart (1976)	Peak position
US Billboard Top LPs & Tape	78
