= Do You Wanna Make Love =

Single by Peter McCann

from the album Peter McCann
- B-side: "Right Time of the Night"
- Released: May 1977
- Genre: Soft rock
- Length: 3:33
- Label: 20th Century
- Songwriter: Peter McCann
- Producer: Hal Yoergler

Peter McCann singles chronology
"Do You Wanna Make Love" (1977)	"Save Me Your Love" (1977)

"Do You Wanna Make Love" is a song written and performed by Peter McCann, an American songwriter. The song was featured on his 1977 album, Peter McCann. "Do You Wanna Make Love" was produced by Hal Yoergler.

The B-side to the single, "Right Time of the Night", was also written by McCann and was recorded by John Travolta and by Jennifer Warnes in 1976 with Warnes' version a hit single in the US in early 1977.

== Chart performance ==
It reached No. 5 on the U.S. Billboard Hot 100 and No. 22 on the adult contemporary chart in 1977. In Canada, the song hit No. 15, and reached No. 10 on the Adult Contemporary chart. In South Africa, the song reached No. 1. The song reached No. 11 in Australia.

The single ranked No. 17 on Billboard's Year-End Hot 100 singles of 1977. It also ranked No. 17 on New Zealand's Top 50 singles of 1977 year-end chart.

== Charting versions ==
- David Wills released a version as a single in 1977 which reached No. 82 on the U.S. country chart.
- Millie Jackson and Isaac Hayes put out a single in 1980 which reached No. 30 on the U.S. R&B chart.
- Buck Owens recorded the song as a single in 1980 which reached No. 74 on the Cashbox country chart and No. 80 on the U.S. country chart.

== Other versions ==
- Leslie Cheung, on his 1977 album, I Like Dreamin'.
- Facts of Life, on their 1978 album, A Matter of Fact.
- The New Seekers, as a single in 1978 in the United Kingdom.
- Peter Doyle, as a single in 1980 in the United Kingdom.

== In popular culture ==
- The song was included in the musical comedy Disaster!
- The song was being played on New York radio station WABC (AM) while the lights went out at the start of the New York City blackout of 1977, during sportscaster George Michael’s shift on the air. Michael's coverage of the event became one of the highlights of his career.
