= Invitation to the Blues =

Single by Ray Price
- A-side: "City Lights"
- Released: 1958
- Recorded: 1958
- Genre: Country
- Length: 2:49
- Label: Columbia
- Songwriter: Roger Miller

"Invitation to the Blues" is a song written by Roger Miller, sung by Ray Price, and released on the Columbia label. In July 1958, it peaked at No. 3 on Billboard's country and western jockey chart and spent a total of 19 weeks on the charts. It was the "B" side to "City Lights", and the record ranked No. 4 on Billboard's 1958 year-end country and western chart.

The lyrics thanks the singer's ex-lover for sending him something he can't use—an "invitation to the blues." Since she left, he has walked the floor so much he's worn out his shoes. Her departure has caused such pain, taken away the laughter and sun, and he doesn't know what to do.

== Cover versions ==
- Rex Allen, ("B" side to "Knock Knock Rattle": Decca 9–30651, 1958)
- Faron Young, (This Is Faron, 1963)
- Reba McEntire (Reba McEntire, 1977)
- Willie Nelson & Roger Miller (Old Friends, 1982
- Emmylou Harris and Rodney Crowell (on their album Old Yellow Moon, 2013)

== See also ==
- Billboard year-end top 50 country & western singles of 1958
