= Get to the Heart =

Album by Barbara Mandrell

Studio album by Barbara Mandrell
- Released: August 19, 1985
- Recorded: June 1985 (Nashville, TN)
- Genre: Country pop
- Length: 34:51
- Label: MCA
- Producer: Tom Collins

Barbara Mandrell chronology
Greatest Hits (1985)	Get to the Heart (1985)	Moments (1986)

Singles from Get to the Heart
- 1. "Angel in Your Arms" Released: July 29, 1985; 2. "Fast Lanes and Country Roads" Released: November 10, 1985; 3. "When You Get to the Heart" Released: March 3, 1986

Get to the Heart is the sixteenth solo studio album by American country artist Barbara Mandrell. The album was released in August 1985 on MCA Records and was produced by Tom Collins. It was Mandrell's first solo studio release since 1984's Clean Cut (which was released just months prior to her car accident in September 1984), and spawned three singles between 1985 and 1986.

== Background and content ==
Get to the Heart was recorded in June 1985 in Nashville, Tennessee. Like her previous releases, the album consisted of 10 tracks. The songs were written from the perspective of the working class American citizen with a Country pop arrangement. The singles "Angel in Your Arms" and "Fast Lanes and Country Roads" specifically followed this format. The album's title track "When You Get to the Heart" was a duet with American country music group, The Oak Ridge Boys. The song was also the album's closing track. Get to the Heart was released on an LP album with five songs available on each side of the record. It has not since been reissued on a compact disc.

== Release ==
Get to the Heart spawned three singles between summer 1985 and winter 1986. The first single from the album was the track "Angel in Your Arms", which was released in July 1985. The single peaked at #8 on the Billboard Magazine Hot Country Singles & Tracks chart and #22 on the Canadian RPM Country Tracks chart. "Fast Lanes and Country Roads" was the second single released in October 1985, peaking at #4 on the Billboard Country Singles chart and #2 on the Canadian Country Chart. The final single released was the title track that included The Oak Ridge Boys. The song reached #20 on Billboard's Hot Country Singles & Tracks chart and reached the Top 40 in Canada. Get to the Heart was released in August 1985 following the success of the lead single. The album peaked at #25 on the Billboard Magazine Top Country Albums chart shortly after its release.

== Track listing ==
Side one

1. "I'm a Believer" – 3:06 (Neil Diamond)
2. "Fast Lanes and Country Roads" – 3:38 (Roger Murrah, Steve Dean)
3. "I'd Fall in Love Tonight" – 3:02 (Mike Reid, Naomi Martin)
4. "Don't Look in My Eyes" – 2:52 (Murrah, Frank J. Myers, Bobbi Duffy)
5. "Angel in Your Arms" – 3:19 (Clayton Ivey, Terry Woodford, Tom Brasfield)

Side two

1. "For Your Love" – 3:23 (Dennis Morgan, Stephen Allen Davis)
2. "If They Grow Tired of My Music" – 3:50 (R. C. Bannon)
3. "You, Only You" – 3:36 (Mack David, Charles Quillen)
4. "Survivors" – 4:15 (Naomi Martin)
5. "When You Get to the Heart" – 3:50 (Norro Wilson, Wayland Holyfield, Tony Brown)
  - with The Oak Ridge Boys

== Sales chart positions ==
Album

Chart (1985)	Peak position
U.S. Top Country Albums	25

Singles

Year	Song	Chart positions	
Year	Song	US Country	CAN Country
1985	"Angel in Your Arms"	8	22
1985	"Fast Lanes and Country Roads"	4	2
1986	"When You Get to the Heart"	20	33
