= Jennifer (album) =

Studio album by Jennifer Warnes
- Released: 1972
- Studio: Whitney Studios, Glendale, California
- Genre: Rock
- Label: Reprise
- Producer: John Cale

Jennifer Warnes chronology
See Me, Feel Me, Touch Me, Heal Me (1969)	Jennifer (1972)	Jennifer Warnes (1976)

Professional ratings
Review scores
Source	Rating
Allmusic	3/5 stars

Jennifer is the third studio album by American singer Jennifer Warnes, released on the Reprise Records label in 1972. It was produced by former Velvet Underground member John Cale.

It sold poorly and was deleted from the Warners catalog in 1973 or 1974 and remained unavailable until 2013 when Japanese Reprise reissued it on CD (WPCR-14865).

Cale's own recording of his song "Empty Bottles" was not officially released until 2004 on the live album Le Bataclan '72.

== Track listing ==
1. "In The Morning" (Barry Gibb) – 2:57
2. "P.F. Sloan" (Jimmy Webb) – 3:50
3. "Empty Bottles" (John Cale) – 3:03
4. "Sand and Foam" (Donovan Leitch) – 2:33
5. "Be My Friend" (Andy Fraser, Paul Rodgers) – 4:48
6. "Needle and Thread" (Carolin Gunston, Peter James Wilson) – 3:53
7. "Last Song" (Jennifer Warnes) – 3:13
8. "All My Love's Laughter" (Jim Webb) – 3:20
9. "These Days" (Jackson Browne) – 3:19
10. "Magdalene (My Regal Zonophone)" (Gary Brooker, Keith Reid) – 3:50

== Personnel ==
- Jennifer Warnes – vocals
- Jim Horn – saxophone
- Milt Holland – drums, percussion
- Sneaky Pete Kleinow – pedal steel guitar
- Spooner Oldham – organ, piano, keyboards
- Ron Elliott – guitar, vocals
- Jackson Browne – guitar
- Richie Hayward – drums
- Russ Kunkel – drums
- Wilton Felder – bass
- St. Paul's Cathedral Boys Choir – backing vocals on "P.F. Sloan"

Technical

- John Cale – production
- Phil Schier – engineer
- Ed Thrasher – art direction, photography
- Dave Bhang – album design
