= Angel in Your Arms =

1977 single by Hot

Single by Hot

from the album Hot
- B-side: "Just 'Cause I'm Guilty"
- Released: February 1977
- Recorded: 1976
- Genre: Southern soul
- Length: 2:57
- Label: Big Tree Records
- Songwriters: Herbert Clayton Ivey, Terrence Woodford, Tom Brasfield
- Producers: Herbert Clayton Ivey, Terrence Woodford

Hot singles chronology
"Angel in Your Arms" (1977)	"Right Feeling at the Wrong Time" (1977)

"Angel in Your Arms"

Single by Robin Lee
- A-side: "Paint the Town Blue"
- Released: December 1983 ( EV 1016 )
- Recorded: Evergreen Studios Nashville : "Angel in Your Arms", "Turning; Back the Covers" recorded 1982
- Genre: Country pop
- Length: 3:04
- Label: Evergreen Records
- Songwriters: Herbert Clayton Ivey, Terrence Woodford, Tom Brasfield
- Producer: Johnny Morrison

Robin Lee singles chronology
"Heart For a Heart" (1983)	"Angel in Your Arms" (1983)	"Want Ads" (1984)

"Angel in Your Arms"

Single by Barbara Mandrell

from the album Get to the Heart
- B-side: "Don't Look in My Eyes"
- Released: July 1985
- Recorded: June 1985
- Genre: C&W
- Length: 3:19
- Label: MCA
- Songwriters: Herbert Clayton Ivey, Terrence Woodford, Tom Brasfield
- Producer: Tom Collins

Barbara Mandrell singles chronology
"There's No Love in Tennessee" (1985)	"Angel in Your Arms" (1985)	"Fast Lanes and Country Roads" (1985)

"Angel in Your Arms" is a song composed by Herbert Clayton Ivey, Terrence Woodford, and Tom Brasfield, which was a 1977 Top Ten hit for Hot, and also a Top Ten country hit in 1985 for Barbara Mandrell.

== Content ==
The song is about a woman who advises an unfaithful mate: "The angel in your arms this morning is gonna be the devil in someone else's arms tonight," meaning that she has assuaged his neglect and infidelities by indulging in illicit trysts of her own.

== Hot version ==
Although "Angel in Your Arms" belongs to the tradition of cheating songs prevalent in country music, the song was introduced by pop/R&B act Hot on their self-titled debut album, recorded in 1976 at Wishbone Studios in Muscle Shoals, Alabama with Wishbone's owners Clayton Ivey and Terrence (Terry) Woodford producing. It was Hot's lead singer Gwen Owens who requested the group be given a country song, and Ivey and Woodford obliged with "Angel in Your Arms", whose third co-writer was Muscle Shoals resident Tom (Tommy) Brasfield. Although Hot was officially a trio consisting of Owens, Cathy Carson, and Juanita Curiel, Owens has stated that she recorded "Angel in Your Arms" with only Carson as background vocalist: Irene Cathaway, with whom Owens and Carson had been performing and who was expected to record with them at Muscle Shoals, was a no-show at the recording studio, and "Angel in Your Arms" was recorded prior to the recruitment of Curiel as Cathaway's replacement. Ivey played keyboards on Hot's recording of "Angel in Your Arms", which featured Mac McAnally on guitar. At the time of Hot's success with their single version, the group also recorded a Spanish-language version entitled "Angel en Tus Brazos".

== Chart history ==
Picked up by Big Tree Records, "Angel in Your Arms" accrued sufficient airplay by February 1977 to enter the Billboard Hot 100, entering the Pop Top 40 that April to peak that July at #6; the track also charted R&B (#29) and Easy Listening (#9). Billboard ranked it as the No. 5 song for 1977. Certified a gold record for U.S. sales of one million units, "Angel in Your Arms" was also a hit for Hot in Australia (#27), Canada (#3) and New Zealand (#7).

Chart (1977)	Peak position
Australia (Kent Music Report)	27
Canada Top Singles	3
New Zealand Singles Chart	7
U.S. Billboard Hot 100	6
U.S. Billboard Easy Listening	9
U.S. Billboard Hot Soul Singles	29

== C&W charting versions ==
- The success of Hot with "Angel in Your Arms" brought an expedient cover aimed at the C&W market by Vivian Bell, a March 1977 release which failed to become a major hit with a #71 C&W peak.
- Robin Lee recorded "Angel in Your Arms" in late 1982, the track originally serving as B-side of her inaugural single release "Turning Back the Covers" (#81 C&W): the single was re-released December 1982 with "Angel in Your Arms" as the A-side and as such more successful though still not a major hit with a #54 C&W peak.
- "Angel in Your Arms" subsequently served as the B-side for two single releases by Lee: "I Heard It on the Radio" (#71 C&W) and the duet with Lobo: "Paint the Town Blue" (#54 C&W).
- Barbara Mandrell, who had scored a 1982 #1 C&W hit with Brasfield's "Till You're Gone", recorded "Angel in Your Arms" in June 1985 in Nashville to serve as an advance single from the album Get to the Heart, marking the first newly recorded release by Mandrell after her 11 September 1984 automobile accident. A thematic return by Mandrell to the connubial concerns prevalent in her early hits, including her 1978 career record "(If Loving You Is Wrong) I Don't Want to Be Right", "Angel in Your Arms" reached #8 C&W.

== Other versions ==
"Angel in Your Arms" has also been recorded by:

- Lynn Anderson (I Love What Love Is Doing to Me 1977),
- Red Hurley (as "The Angel in Your Arms") (With Love 1978)
- Millie Jackson (Feelin' Bitchy 1977)
- Reba McEntire (Reba McEntire 1977)
- Billie Jo Spears (I Will Survive 1979).
- In the UK, where the Hot's original recording had an unsuccessful April 1977 release, "Angel in Your Arms" was recorded in 1979 by veteran vocalist Carol Deene who had been inactive for some years: Deene's version, released on her own Koala label, failed to effect a chart comeback.
- "Angel in Your Arms" was one of a number of tracks recorded in the spring of 2009 at Muscle Shoals Sound Studio by Queen Emily; Wolf Stephenson produced the sessions which featured Clayton Ivey on keyboards. The Queen Emily album was released in the UK in December 2010.
- A Finnish rendering: "Älä Kysy Kuka On Sylissäin", was recorded by Vicky for her 1978 album Tee Mulle Niin.
