= I Know a Heartache When I See One =

Song by Jennifer Warnes from her third LP Shot Through the Heart

Single by Jennifer Warnes

from the album Shot Through the Heart
- B-side: "Frankie in the Rain"
- Released: June 1979
- Genre: Pop, country
- Length: 3:24
- Label: Arista
- Songwriters: Rory Bourke, Kerry Chater, Charlie Black
- Producer: Rob Fraboni

Jennifer Warnes singles chronology
"I'm Dreaming" (1977)	"I Know a Heartache When I See One" (1979)	"Don't Make Me Over" (1979)

"I Know a Heartache When I See One" is a song by Jennifer Warnes from her fifth LP, Shot Through the Heart. It was the first of three charting singles from the album.

The song peaked at #19 on the U.S. Billboard Hot 100 and #14 on the Adult Contemporary chart. It was also a modest hit in Canada (#46).

"I Know a Heartache When I See One" did best on the Country and Western charts, reaching #10 in the U.S. and #12 in Canada. It became Arista Records' lone C&W top ten hit prior to 1990.

== Chart history ==
Chart (1979)	Peak position
Canada RPM Top Singles	46
Canada RPM Country	12
U.S. Billboard Hot 100	19
U.S. Billboard Hot Country Songs	10
U.S. Billboard Adult Contemporary	14
U.S. Cash Box Top 100	21

== Cover versions ==
- Canadian country singer Lisa Brokop recorded a cover for her 1996 album Lisa Brokop.
- Country singer Jo Dee Messina recorded her own version of the song for her 1998 album I'm Alright.
