= It Goes Like It Goes =

Single by Jennifer Warnes
- Released: 1979
- Composer(s): David Shire
- Lyricist(s): Norman Gimbel

"It Goes Like It Goes" is a song written by David Shire and Norman Gimbel. Jennifer Warnes sang the vocals for the Norma Rae soundtrack in 1979. "It Goes Like It Goes" won an Academy Award for Best Original Song in 1979, defeating such fellow nominees as "Through the Eyes of Love" from Ice Castles and "Rainbow Connection" from The Muppet Movie, to the consternation of some critics.

Shortly after its Oscar win, the song was covered and released as a single by Dusty Springfield.
