= Love's Grown Deep =

Single by Kenny Nolan

from the album Kenny Nolan
- B-side: "Today I Met the Girl I'm Gonna Marry"
- Released: March 1977
- Recorded: 1976
- Genre: Pop
- Label: 20th Century Fox Records
- Songwriter: Kenny Nolan
- Producers: Kenny Nolan and Charlie Calello

Kenny Nolan singles chronology
"I Like Dreamin'" (1976)	"Love's Grown Deep" (1977)	"My Eyes Get Blurry" (1977)

"Love's Grown Deep" is a song by Kenny Nolan, taken from his eponymous debut album. The recording was issued as his follow-up to his major hit song, "I Like Dreamin'" and is similar in style.

"Love's Grown Deep" reached No. 20 on the U.S. Billboard Hot 100. It also hit No. 3 on the Adult Contemporary chart. The song was an equally large hit in Canada, where it likewise peaked at No. 20 on the Pop Singles chart and reached No. 1 on the Adult Contemporary chart.

== Chart performance ==
=== Weekly charts ===
Chart (1977)	Peak position
Canadian RPM Top Singles	20
Canadian RPM Adult Contemporary	1
U.S. Billboard Hot 100	20
U.S. Billboard Adult Contemporary	3
U.S. Cash Box Top 100	25

=== Year-end charts ===
Chart (1977)	Rank
Canada RPM Top Singles	154
U.S. Billboard Hot 100	85
U.S. Billboard Adult Contemporary	33
U.S. Cash Box	98

== Cover versions ==
"Love's Grown Deep" was covered by Shalamar on their 1987 LP, Circumstantial Evidence.
