= Jennifer Warnes (album) =

Studio album by Jennifer Warnes
- Released: 1 January 1977
- Recorded: May 1975 – 1976
- Studio: The Village Recorder (Los Angeles, California); Davlen Sound Studios (North Hollywood, California)
- Genre: Rock, pop, country rock, folk rock
- Length: 38:45
- Label: Arista
- Producer: Jim Price; Jim Ed Norman

Jennifer Warnes chronology
Jennifer (1972)	Jennifer Warnes (1977)	Shot Through the Heart (1979)

Singles from Jennifer Warnes
- 1. "Right Time of the Night" Released: January 1, 1977

Professional ratings
Review scores
Source	Rating
AllMusic	3/5 stars
Encyclopedia of Popular Music	2/5 stars

Jennifer Warnes is the fourth album by American singer/songwriter Jennifer Warnes, released in late 1976 as her inaugural Arista Records album. It was her first album where she was credited by her full name, after being credited as simply "Jennifer" on her first three albums. The disc generated Warnes' first Billboard Hot 100 single "Right Time of the Night" which also ranked on the Billboard hit listings of C&W and Easy Listening tracks, with "Right Time..." reaching No. 1 on the latter. The second single, "I'm Dreaming" also reached the Easy Listening top ten.

Warnes had been signed by Arista Records president Clive Davis in April 1975 on the recommendation of Jim Price, and from May 1975 Price oversaw sessions – at the Village Recorder in west Los Angeles – for tracks intended for Warnes' inaugural Arista album. Price, producing Warnes sporadically as his work schedule permitted – Warnes said that "[Price was] producing,...arranging, singing, engineering, playing horns and so forth [for various artists]" – could not present Clive Davis with the completed tracks Price intended to comprise Warnes' inaugural Arista album until the summer of 1976.

Davis' reaction to the intended album for Warnes was: "It was a good enough album but it didn't have anything on it that could give her the hit single she needs", and Davis resultantly recruited Jim Ed Norman to produce two tracks to supplement Price's work, with Norman overseeing Warnes' sessions for the tracks "Right Time of the Night" and "I'm Dreamin" at Davlen Sound Studios in July 1976. Warnes said: "Clive picked 'I'm Dreaming' and 'Right Time of the Night', and he brought in Jim Ed Norman...to give those songs very explicit tracks"- Norman, who had been a member of Don Henley's pre-Eagles band Shiloh, having overseen string arrangements for the Eagles' albums Desperado and One of These Nights and also having arranged strings for Linda Ronstadt's version of "Desperado" (album Don't Cry Now/ 1973). Warnes said: "Because of the amount of money Linda Ronstadt was making for Asylum [Records] Arista pretty much saw me as [their] ticket [to similar success]."

Clive Davis also assigned Val Garay to mix "Right Time of the Night" and "I'm Dreaming" and also remix Warnes' Jim Price-produced tracks: Garay had mixed the Linda Ronstadt albums Heart Like a Wheel and Prisoner in Disguise and around the time of his work on the Jennifer Warnes album was working on Ronstadt's album Hasten Down the Wind. The production costs of the Jim Price sessions with Jennifer Warnes had totaled $60,000: the recording of the two supplementary tracks: "Right Time..." and "I'm Dreaming", plus the expenditure for the Garay remix upped the production costs of the Jennifer Warnes album to a $115,000 total.

After scheduling the Jennifer Warnes album for August 1976 release, Davis elected to hold back release until the new year, deeming Warnes' album likely to be lost in the holiday season sales boom. Both the album and its lead single "Right Time of the Night" would in fact be released 1 January 1977 with the Jennifer Warnes album debuting at No. 189 on the Billboard 200 album chart dated 26 February 1977, which in that week "Right Time of the Night" entered the top 40 of the Billboard Hot 100 en route to a No. 6 peak that May with the Jennifer Warnes album peaking at No. 43 the same month.

== Track listing ==
1. "Love Hurts" (Boudleaux Bryant) – 3:20
2. "Round and Round" (Daniel Moore) – 4:41
3. "Shine a Light" (Mick Jagger, Keith Richards) – 4:12
4. "You're the One" (Stephen Ferguson) – 4:22
5. "I'm Dreaming" (Richard Kerr, Gary Osborne) – 3:32
6. "Mama" (Stephen Ferguson) – 2:11
7. "Right Time of the Night" (Peter McCann) – 2:55
8. "Bring Ol' Maggie Back Home" (Daniel Moore) – 4:29
9. "Don't Lead Me On" (Doug Haywood) – 2:58
10. "Daddy Don't Go" (Jennifer Warnes) – 4:54
11. "O God of Loveliness (O Bello Dio Del Paradiso)" (Alphonsus Liguori; translated by Rev. Paradiso E. Vaughan) – 1:11

== Personnel ==
- Jennifer Warnes – vocals, backing vocals
- Nicky Hopkins – acoustic piano (1, 3, 4)
- Peggy Sandvig – electric piano (1, 3), acoustic piano (2, 4, 8–11)
- Alan Lindgren – acoustic piano (5)
- Doug Livingston – acoustic piano (6), steel guitar (7)
- Brian Whitcomb – keyboards (7)
- Jay Graydon – guitars (1–4, 8, 10)
- Dan Sawyer – guitars (3)
- John Hug – guitars (5, 7)
- Doug Rhone – guitars (5)
- Kenny Edwards – guitars (7)
- Ben Benay – guitars (9)
- Danny Kortchmar – guitars (9), electric piano (10)
- Dave McDaniel – bass (1–4, 8–10)
- Reinie Press – bass (5)
- Mike Bowden – bass (7)
- Joe Correro – drums (1, 3)
- Russ Kunkel – drums (2, 9, 10)
- Dennis St. John – drums (5)
- Matt Betton – drums (7)
- Ralph Humphrey – drums (8)
- Laudir de Oliveira – percussion (3)
- Jim Horn – flute (1, 2, 4), English horn (4), alto saxophone (8)
- Skip Mesquite – tenor saxophone (3)
- Max Haskett – trumpet (3)
- Steve Madaio – trumpet (3, 8)
- Gayle Levant – harp (4, 9)
- Bill Kurausch & Co. – strings (4, 9)
- Sid Sharp – strings (4, 9)
- James Getzoff – strings (5, 7)
- Ray Kelley – strings (5, 7)
- Jim Price – backing vocals (1–3, 8–10), electric piano (2), organ (2), trombone (3, 8), brass (4)
- Daniel Moore – backing vocals (2, 3, 8)
- Matthew Moore – backing vocals (2, 3, 8)
- Jim Moore – backing vocals (3)
- Herb Pedersen – backing vocals (5)
- Beth Fitchet Wood – backing vocals (5)
- Doug Haywood – backing vocals (7)

Production and Technical

- Jim Price – producer (1–4, 6, 8–11), engineer
- Jim Ed Norman – producer (5, 7)
- Stephen Barncard – engineer
- Neil Brody – engineer
- Rob Fraboni – engineer
- Andy Johns – engineer
- Tim Kramer – engineer
- Ed Lever – engineer
- Michael Lietz – engineer
- Eric Prestidge – engineer
- Larry Quinn – engineer
- Nat Seligman – engineer
- Gary Starr – engineer
- Joe Tuzon – engineer
- Zak Zenor – engineer
- Val Garay – remixing (5, 7)
- Bernie Grundman – mastering at A&M Mastering Studios (Hollywood, California)
- Norman Seeff – design
- Gary Heery – photography
- Norman Epstein – management

== Charts ==
Chart performance for Jennifer Warnes
Chart (1977)	Peak position
Australian Albums (Kent Music Report)	92
US Billboard 200	43
