= Peter McCann (album) =

Studio album by Peter McCann
- Released: 1977
- Genre: Soft rock
- Length: 31:17
- Label: 20th Century
- Producer: Hal Yoergler

Peter McCann chronology
Peter McCann (1977)	One on One (1979)

Singles from Peter McCann
- 1. "Do You Wanna Make Love"/"Right Time of the Night" Released: May 1977; 2. "Save Me Your Love"/"It's Easy" Released: September 1977

Peter McCann is the debut album by Peter McCann and was released in 1977. It reached No. 82 on the Billboard Top LPs chart.

The album featured two singles: "Do You Wanna Make Love", which reached No. 5 on the Billboard Hot 100 and "Save Me Your Love", which did not chart.

== Track listing ==
All songs written by Peter McCann.

1. "Do You Wanna Make Love" – 3:33
2. "Everybody's Got to Hold on to Something" - 2:51
3. "I Can't Live Without You" - 3:34
4. "It's Easy" - 2:55
5. "The Things You Left Behind" - 3:30
6. "Save Me Your Love" - 2:31
7. "Suicide and Vine" - 2:39
8. "Broken White Line" – 3:21
9. "Right Time of the Night" – 3:09
10. "If You Can't Find Love" – 3:29

== Personnel ==
- Hal Yoergler – producer
- Barry Rudolph – engineer
- Larry Hirsch – engineer
- Bob MacLeod – mastering
- Artie Butler – arranger (tracks: 1, 3, 6–7)
- Brian Whitcomb – arranger (tracks: 4, 8), keyboards
- Peter McCann – arranger (tracks: 5, 10), lead vocals, piano, acoustic guitar
- George Marinelli Jr. – electric guitar
- John Hug – electric guitar, acoustic guitar
- Dennis Belfield – bass
- Ernie Watts – saxophone, oboe
- Michael Botts – drums (tracks: 1–9)
- Ace Holleran – drums (track: 10)
- Larry Treadwell – harmonica

== Charts ==
Chart (1977)	Peak position
US Top LPs (Billboard)	82

Singles

Year	Single	Chart	Position
1977	"Do You Wanna Make Love"	US Billboard Hot 100	5
1977	"Do You Wanna Make Love"	US US Easy Listening	22
