= I Like Dreamin' =

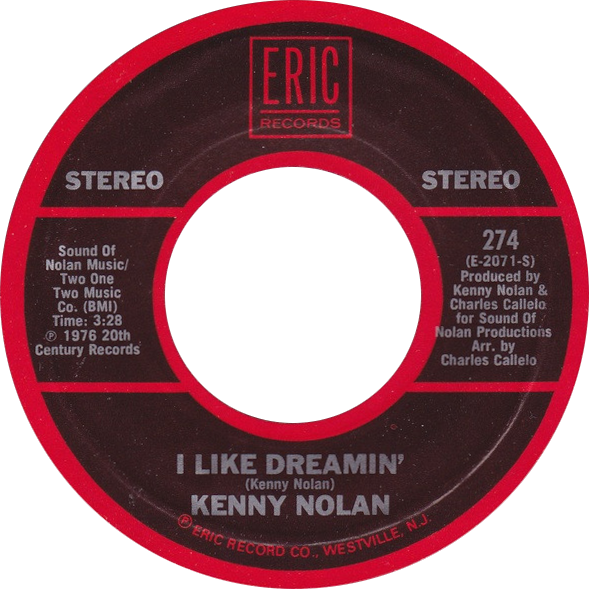
- One of US single reissues

Single by Kenny Nolan

from the album Kenny Nolan
- B-side: "Time Ain't Time Enough"
- Released: October 1976
- Recorded: 1976
- Length: 3:29
- Label: 20th Century Fox Records
- Songwriter: Kenny Nolan
- Producers: Kenny Nolan and Charlie Calello

Kenny Nolan singles chronology
"I Like Dreamin'" (1976)	"Love's Grown Deep" (1977)

"I Like Dreamin'" is the debut single by Kenny Nolan, taken from his debut album Kenny Nolan. The recording was issued as the album's lead single in October 1976, spending 27 weeks on the U.S. Billboard Hot 100.

== Background ==
The song tells about a man who dreams about an apparently unattainable woman with whom he shares intimate moments, a romantic walk on a beach and, as their love grows, raising a family. He likes these dreams but, of course, always wakes to find that his longed-for lover is "just not there".

== Chart performance ==
It slowly crawled to number 3 on the Hot 100 chart as well as the Cash Box Top 100 by early March 1977. The song became a Gold record. "I Like Dreamin'" was an equally large hit in Canada, where it peaked at number 3 on the Pop Singles chart and was also a number 1 hit on the Adult Contemporary chart.

=== Weekly charts ===
Chart (1976–1977)	Peak position
Australia (Kent Music Report)	16
Canadian RPM Top Singles	3
Canadian RPM Adult Contemporary	1
New Zealand	9
South Africa (Springbok Radio)	10
US Billboard Hot 100	3
US Billboard Adult Contemporary	4
US Cash Box Top 100	3

=== Year-end charts ===
Chart (1977)	Rank
Australia (Kent Music Report)	83
Canada RPM Top Singles	43
US Billboard Hot 100	6
US Billboard Adult Contemporary	24
US Cash Box Top 100	7
