= Kenny Nolan =

American singer-songwriter (born 1949)

- Born: September 30, 1949 (age 77); Los Angeles, California, U.S.
- Genres: Pop, adult contemporary, soft rock
- Occupations: Singer, songwriter, musician
- Instruments: Vocals, keyboards, guitar, piano
- Years active: 1971–present
- Labels: 20th Century, Polydor, Casablanca, MCA

Kenneth "Kenny" Nolan (born September 30, 1949) is an American singer-songwriter from Los Angeles, California.

He is best remembered for the 1976–77 song "I Like Dreamin'", which he wrote and performed; it reached No. 3 on the Billboard Hot 100 and No. 4 on the Easy Listening chart. He wrote "Swing Your Daddy", which became a 1975 hit for Jim Gilstrap, reaching No. 4 on the UK Singles Chart and No. 10 on the US Billboard Black Singles chart of that year.

Nolan also co-wrote several hits with Bob Crewe, including Frankie Valli's "My Eyes Adored You" and Labelle's "Lady Marmalade". Both of these hit songs hit No. 1 on Billboard magazine's Hot 100 chart in March of 1975. Of note, "My Eyes Adored You" hit No. 1 on March 22, 1975 and the very next week, "Lady Marmalade" hit No. 1 on March 29, 1975. This marked one of the few times in chart history when the same songwriter(s) had back-to-back hits at No. 1 (John Lennon and Paul McCartney of the Beatles, Holland-Dozier-Holland of Motown fame, and the Bee Gees have accomplished this feat).

== Life and career ==
At the age of 13, Nolan won a scholarship to the University of Southern California for musical composition, but dropped out after six months, bored with the conventional regimen. Four years later, a scholarship to Chouinard went the same way, and Nolan decided to send songs in to any musician he thought might be suitable. It brought him to the attention of both veteran songwriter Bob Crewe and entrepreneur Wes Farrell, both of whom harnessed the then youngster's talent.

As house producer at Farrell's Chelsea record label, Nolan wrote and/or produced a string of successful singles for the label, including Jim Gilstrap's "Swing Your Daddy" and "Take Your Daddy for a Ride"; Dee Clark's "Ride a Wild Horse"; and Linda Carr's "High Wire". With Crewe, meanwhile, he co-wrote some of the era's biggest successes. They included Disco-Tex and the Sex-O-Lettes' "Get Dancin'", Labelle's "Lady Marmalade", and Frankie Valli's "My Eyes Adored You". He wrote the song "Flirtin'" for The Donny Osmond Album (1971), as well as the final top 40 hit for Tavares in 1982, entitled "A Penny for Your Thoughts".

Nolan also had ambition to perform – he supplied the falsetto that dominated "Get Dancin'" – and, after a short tenure with Firefly, he moved onto the studio group the Eleventh Hour. Produced by Crewe, the band scored two minor hits in the United States with "So Good" (1974) and the album, Hollywood Hot (1976).

In 1976, Nolan decided to record his own version of a song he had been commissioned to write by another. "I Like Dreamin'" was released by the Eleventh Hour's label 20th Century, and in early November it finally entered the U.S. chart, to begin a three-month crawl to its peak at No. 3.

Nolan followed it in the spring with the top 20 hit "Love's Grown Deep", taken from his self-titled album; he was named Number One New Pop Singles Artist of 1977 by Billboard magazine. "My Eyes Get Blurry" was the next single, from Nolan's second album, 1978's A Song Between Us. Night Miracles followed two years later, bringing a new single, "Us and Love (We Go Together)", to the mid-reaches of the chart in early 1980, but it failed to give Nolan any further major success.

He continued to record, however, signing to MCA and releasing Head to Toe in 1982. That album produced two singles, "Love Song" and "Soft Rock Hard Love", but further commercial success as a recording artist eluded him. However, he continued to write songs that became hits for other artists, including "Shoot 'Em Up Movies", which became a top ten R&B hit for soul/boogie band the Deele in 1988.

In the 1990s, Nolan wrote "Masterpiece", which became a crossover hit for another soul band Atlantic Starr.

== Discography ==
=== Albums ===
- Kenny Nolan (1977), 20th Century
- A Song Between Us (1978), Polydor
- Night Miracles (1979), Casablanca
- Head to Toe (1982), MCA

=== Singles ===
| Year | Single | Peak chart positions | | | | | Album |
| Year | Single | US | US AC | AUS | CAN | CAN AC | Album |
|---|---|---|---|---|---|---|---|
| 1976 | "I Like Dreamin'" | 3 | 4 | 16 | 3 | 1 | Kenny Nolan |
| 1977 | "Love's Grown Deep" | 20 | 3 | — | 20 | 1 | Kenny Nolan |
| 1977 | "My Eyes Get Blurry" | 97 | 42 | — | — | — | Kenny Nolan |
| 1980 | "Us and Love (We Go Together)" | 44 | 36 | — | — | — | Night Miracles |
| 1982 | "Love Song" | — | — | — | — | — | Head to Toe |
| 1982 | "Soft Rock Hard Love" | — | — | — | — | — | Head to Toe |
