= Right Time of the Night =

- picture sleeve of February 1983 UK release

Single by Jennifer Warnes

from the album Jennifer Warnes
- B-side: "Daddy Don't Go"
- Released: January 1, 1977
- Recorded: July 1976
- Studio: Davlen Sound Studios
- Genre: Soft rock; adult contemporary; pop
- Length: 2:53
- Label: Arista
- Songwriter: Peter McCann
- Producer: Jim Ed Norman

Jennifer Warnes singles chronology
"These Days" (1972)	"Right Time of the Night" (1977)	"I'm Dreaming" (1977)

"Right Time of the Night" is the title of a composition by Peter McCann, which became a top-ten hit single in 1977 via a recording by Jennifer Warnes.

== Composition ==
Peter McCann would recall his inspiration for writing "Right Time of the Night": "I was out at the beach at Malibu, and it was one of those perfect sunsets. I was there for the entire evening, and the sun went down and the stars came out. But...and it was totally accidental - I didn't mention the beach [or] anything like that [in the lyrics] because that would have regionalized [the song]." McCann had been working as a staff writer for American Broadcasting Music for roughly a year without composing a high-profile song: (Peter McCann quote:) - "I played ['Right Time...'] for [boss] Gerry Teifer...For the first time...he let me play [a] whole song through, and then he did something he'd never done before. He said: 'Play that again.' I played it again, and he goes: 'Wait here.' He brought in everybody in the building who was working there and said 'Play it.' I played it, and they all cheered and went nuts. I thought it was just another song I had written, but apparently not."

Writer Peter McCann on "Right Time of the Night"
"Right Time of the Night" is intended to make people sigh and hold hands. "Do You Wanna Make Love" is intended to make them think. If I can keep writing songs that have that kind of an identification, that kind of a purpose, then I'll have a career....I don't think there are too many people who couldn't sing "Right Time of the Night". You want a lot of people to record a lot of your songs...You aim for...that kind of a reputation. A lot of people think I should be upset because Jennifer [Warnes] had a hit with "Right Time of the Night" but...it did as much for me as it did for her in terms of reputation and everything like that."

Originally written and recorded by Peter McCann for his 1977 self-titled album, "Right Time of the Night", which would serve as the B-side for McCann's own 1977 top ten hit "Do You Wanna Make Love", featured a distinct second verse that was eventually reworked by Jennifer Warnes; she herself wrote lyrics for a less overtly masculine second verse which McCann rejected, eventually himself writing new second verse lyrics deemed female-friendly. Prior to the release of Warnes's version of "Right Time", Bette Midler expressed an interest in recording the song but asked that the bridge be reworked, a stipulation McCann was still working on when Warnes's version reached the charts, at which point work on a Midler version was dropped.

"Right Time of the Night" was one of seven songs which McCann played for Clive Davis, president of Arista Records (for whom Jennifer Warnes recorded) when McCann was making the rounds of auditions in hopes of being signed as a recording artist. McCann would recall Davis saying: "I don't like you as an artist, but I'm taking six of the seven songs." "Right Time" was one of the six songs Davis optioned (the one song Davis passed on was "Do You Wanna Make Love" which would afford McCann a top ten hit when he recorded it after his October 1976 signing with 20th Century Records).

== Recording by Jennifer Warnes ==
=== Background ===
Session Personnel for "Right Time
of the Night" by Jennifer Warnes
Backing vocals • Doug Haywood
Bass • Michael Bowden
Drums • Matt Betton Jr
Guitar • Kenny Edwards, John Leslie Hug
Steel guitar • Doug Livingston
Keyboards • Brian Whitcomb
Strings • Jimmy Getsoff, Ray Kelley

The inaugural Arista Records single and album releases of Jennifer Warnes: the single "Right Time of the Night" and its parent Jennifer Warnes album, were both released in January 1977, over a year and a half subsequent to Warnes' April 1975 signing with Arista. Although the recording of the Jennifer Warnes album had commenced in May 1975, her producer Jim Price would record Warnes only sporadically as his work schedule permitted - (Jennifer Warnes quote:)"[Price was] producing,...arranging, singing, engineering, playing horns and so forth [for various artists]" - and so Arista president Clive Davis was not presented with the completed tracks intended to comprise Warnes' inaugural Arista album until the summer of 1976.

Davis' reaction to the intended album for Warnes was (Clive Davis quote): "It was a good enough album but it didn't have anything on it that could give her the hit single she needs", and Davis resultantly recruited Jim Ed Norman to produce two tracks to supplement Price's work, with Norman overseeing Warnes' sessions for the tracks "Right Time of the Night" and "I'm Dreamin" at Davlen Sound Studios in July 1976. (Jennifer Warnes quote:): "Clive picked 'I'm Dreaming' and 'Right Time of the Night', and he brought in Jim Ed Norman...to give those songs very explicit tracks"- Norman, who had been a member of Don Henley's pre-Eagles band Shiloh, having overseen string arrangements for the Eagles' albums Desperado and One of These Nights and also having arranged strings for Linda Ronstadt's version of "Desperado" (album Don't Cry Now/ 1973). (Jennifer Warnes quote:):"Because of the amount of money Linda Ronstadt was making for Asylum [Records] Arista pretty much saw me as [their] ticket [to similar success]."

Producer Jim Ed Norman
on "Right Time of the Night"
Jennifer Warnes didn't want to do "Right Time of the Night". I tried to intellectually express why I thought that song could work for her, how it had potential, how it could be done [saying:] 'I would do my best to make sure that she got what she wanted, et cetera et cetera.' It took several dinners and meals to finally get her to kind of relax and say: 'Okay okay'."

Warnes' recordings of "Right Time of the Night" and "I'm Dreaming" would mark the debut of Jim Ed Norman as a record producer: Norman had been working as a recording studio tape copyist when he was recruited as a producer by Clive Davis on the recommendation of Hank Medress and Dave Appell the producers of Arista star act Tony Orlando & Dawn (Norman had arranged and conducted the strings for the 1976 Group With No Name album Moon Over Brooklyn which was a Medress-Appell production). Upon hearing "Right Time..." as one of a number of demos of songs Davis felt had hit potential, Norman would recall telling Davis: "If you’re going to give me a chance to make a record for you, let it be with that song."

Davis, who assisted in the vocal arrangement of "Right Time of the Night", assigned Val Garay to mix "Right Time..." and "I'm Dreaming" and also remix Warnes' Jim Price-produced tracks: Garay had mixed the Linda Ronstadt albums Heart Like a Wheel and Prisoner in Disguise and around the time of his work on the Jennifer Warnes album was working on Ronstadt's album Hasten Down the Wind. The production costs of the Jim Price sessions with Jennifer Warnes had totaled $60,000: the recording of the two supplementary tracks: "Right Time..." and "I'm Dreaming", plus the expenditure for the Garay remix upped the production costs of the Jennifer Warnes album to a $115,000 total.

Warnes' recording of "Right Time of the Night" features a lyrically distinct second verse from the original Peter McCann song: Warnes herself wrote lyrics for a less overtly masculine second verse which McCann rejected, eventually himself writing new second verse lyrics deemed female-friendly.

=== Release and reception ===
After scheduling the Jennifer Warnes album for August 1976 release, Davis elected to hold back release until the new year, deeming Warnes' album likely to be lost in the holiday season sales boom: both the album and its lead single "Right Time of the Night" were resultantly released 1 January 1977. "Right Time..." would debut on the 29 January 1977 edition of the Billboard Hot 100 at #81, Warnes' first appearance on the chart in a nine-year recording career: the single would reach a #6 Hot 100 peak that May - paralleled by a #5 peak in Cash Box.

"Right Time of the Night" would also become the first Arista release to reach the C&W chart, where it peaked at #17: the single's promotion in Nashville - the hub of C&W music - was handled by the Nashville office of ABC Music Productions who were the publishers of the song. On the Billboard ranking of Easy Listening hits "Right Time of the Night" would reach #1 and would be ranked at #11 on the tally of the year's most successful Easy Listening hits.

Ranked at #34 on Billboard's listing of the most successful Hot 100 hits of the year 1977, "Right Time of the Night" would be the first of six Hot 100 entries for Jennifer Warnes as a soloist and would remain her most successful solo hit, her one further top 40 hit "I Know a Heartache When I See One" peaking at #19 in 1979. However Warnes was to twice reach #1 on the Billboard Hot 100 as a duo member, first with Joe Cocker on "Up Where We Belong" (1982) and then with Bill Medley on "(I've Had) The Time of My Life" (1987).

Singer Jennifer Warnes on
"Right Time of the Night"
I'm grateful for it, but I didn't pick the song...It's a mixed feeling...to have someone else make the decisions for you and then of course it's successful because they have the radio operation. What can I say? People love the song.

High Fidelity critic Todd Everett would contrast "Right Time of the Night" with the bulk of its parent album: in Everett's estimation the Jim Price-produced tracks evinced the penchant of Warnes' earlier albums "toward rock & roll as art song" and were sung by Warnes "as though [with] fists clenched, both arms straight down at her sides, staring at the microphone", while "Right Time..." "boasts a much more powerful vocal treatment (when I first heard it on the radio I thought that it was [iconic 60's vocalist] Darlene Love!) that sounds great, but may not be the kind of thing that Warnes wants to be identified with." While promoting Famous Blue Raincoat, her career defining 1986 album of Leonard Cohen songs, Warnes was indeed quoted as saying: "I had an easier time singing [Cohen's] songs than I had singing 'Right Time of the Night'. There's a side to [Cohen's] music that's more complex than what normal pop music will allow;""My heart and soul and mind are more complex than 'It's the right time of the night for making love' - although I'm grateful for [that] pop hit...I had [more profound] things to say".

==== Chart performance ====
US charts (1977)	Peak	International charts (1977)	Peak	Year-end charts (1977)	Rank
US Hot 100 (Billboard)	6	Australian Top Singles (Kent Music Report)	33	Canada Top Singles (RPM)	40
US Easy Listening (Billboard)	1	Canadian Top Singles (RPM)	3	US Hot 100 (Billboard)	34
US Hot Country Singles (Billboard)	17	Canadian Adult Contemporary (RPM)	1	US Easy Listening (Billboard)	11
		Canadian Country Playlist (RPM)	18		

=== UK release ===
"Right Time of the Night" had a 4 March 1977 UK single release, garnering sufficient interest that in May 1977 "Right Time..." ranked on Record Mirror magazine's "Starbreaker" chart - the equivalent of the Bubbling Under... chart in Billboard - although the single would not advance into the official UK Top 50. "Right Time..." would be reissued in the UK in February 1983: Arista, who had dropped Warnes from its roster in 1982, replaced the original B-side "Daddy Don't Go" with "I'm Restless" a track from Warnes' 1979 album release Shot Through the Heart. Warnes' duet with Joe Cocker: "Up Where We Belong" (on Island Records), was in the UK Top Ten in February 1983 but this apparently failed to afford any prestige to the re-release of "Right Time..." as the track again failed to rank in the official UK chart (despite the official chart by that time having expanded to a Top 100).

== Other versions ==
"Right Time of the Night" also featured on 1977 album releases by Reba McEntire - on her self-titled debut album - and Lynn Anderson (I Love What Love Is Doin' to Me). Anderson performed the song on the final episode of The Brady Bunch Hour.

Mary Mason recorded the song in medley with the Marmalade hit "Baby Make It Soon"; introduced on Mason's Angel of the Morning album, the track "Right Time of the Night/Baby Make It Soon" was released as a single in the UK in 1978.

John Travolta's recording of "Right Time of the Night" was released as a single in 1975 and was later included on his 1978 compilation album Travolta Fever.

Eva Dahlgren recorded the song with her self-penned Swedish lyrics as "Finns Det Nån Som Bryr Sig Om" which served as the title cut for Dahlgren's 1978 debut album.

"Right Time of the Night" has also been recorded by Tracy Huang, by Dominic Kirwan, by Danny Ray with Shirley James, and by Anita Sarawak.

== See also ==
- List of number-one adult contemporary singles of 1977 (U.S.)
