= Shot Through the Heart (album) =

Studio album by Jennifer Warnes
- Released: May 1979
- Studio: Shangri-La Studios (Malibu, California); The Village Recorder (Los Angeles, California); Sunset Sound and Allen Zentz Recording (Hollywood, California); Olympic Studios and CBS Studios (London, England)
- Genre: Rock, country rock
- Length: 36:12
- Label: Arista
- Producer: Rob Fraboni; Jennifer Warnes

Jennifer Warnes chronology
Jennifer Warnes (1977)	Shot Through the Heart (1979)	Best of Jennifer Warnes (1982)

Professional ratings
Review scores
Source	Rating
AllMusic	4/5 stars
The Encyclopedia of Popular Music	2/5 stars

Shot Through the Heart is the fifth album by American singer/songwriter Jennifer Warnes, released on Arista Records in 1979. It peaked at #13 on the Billboard Country albums chart and #94 on the main Billboard albums chart.

The premier single from the album: "I Know a Heartache When I See One", peaked at #19 on the Billboard singles chart and reached #10 on the Hot Country Songs (C&W) listing, becoming Arista Records' lone C&W Top Ten hit prior to 1990. The song peaked at #14 on the Adult Contemporary charts; follow-up singles "Don't Make Me Over" and "When the Feeling Comes Around" also made the Adult Contemporary charts. Despite modest sales, the album has always been a favorite recording of the artist's fans.

== Track listing ==
1. "Shot Through the Heart" (Jennifer Warnes) – 4:18
2. "I Know a Heartache When I See One" (Rory Bourke, Kerry Chater, Charlie Black) – 3:30
3. "Don't Make Me Over" (Burt Bacharach, Hal David) – 4:22
4. "You Remember Me" (Jesse Winchester) – 4:41
5. "Sign on the Window" (Bob Dylan) – 2:46
6. "I'm Restless" (Warnes) – 4:16
7. "Tell Me Just One More Time" (Leo Sayer, Tom Snow) – 2:39
8. "When the Feeling Comes Around" (Rick Cunha) – 3:17
9. "Frankie in the Rain" (Warnes) – 2:49
10. "Hard Times Come Again No More" (Stephen Foster) – 3:34

== Personnel ==
- Jennifer Warnes – lead vocals, backing vocals (1, 2, 5, 7, 8, 10), percussion (1), acoustic piano (6, 9), electric harpsichord (9), string arrangements (9), arrangements (10)
- Andrew Gold – acoustic piano (1, 3), bass (1), drums (1), backing vocals (1, 2, 8), guitars (2, 8), tambourine (2), rhythm guitar (3), guitar solo (3), string arrangements (3), marimba (8), percussion (8)
- Brock Walsh – electric piano (2, 8), backing vocals (2, 7, 8)
- Mark Olson – acoustic piano (4), piano arrangements (4)
- Marty Grebb – electric piano (4), organ (4, 5)
- Doug Livingston – clavinet (4), steel guitar (4)
- Bill Elliott – acoustic piano (5), arrangements and conductor (10)
- Walt Richmond – electric piano (7)
- John Cale – electric harpsichord concept (9)
- Buzz Feiten – rhythm guitar (3), guitars (5)
- Bob Glaub – bass (2, 3)
- Abraham Laboriel – bass (4–8)
- Jim Gordon – drums (2)
- Denny Seiwell – drums (3–8)
- Rob Fraboni – percussion (1)
- Ricky Fataar – percussion (7)
- Cliff Goldsmith – percussion (8)
- David Campbell – string arrangements (3, 4, 9), string conductor (3, 4, 9)
- Nick Harrison – string arrangements and conductor (6, 8)
- Martyn Ford – concertmaster (6, 8)
- Ron Cooper – cello (9)
- Paula Hochhalter – cello (9)
- Dennis Karmazyn – cello soloist (9)
- Blondie Chaplin – backing vocals (1, 7), tambourine (5), guitars (7)
- Penny Nichols – backing vocals (5)
- Kenny Edwards – backing vocals (10)
- Mike Finnigan – backing vocals (10)
- Brian Russell – backing vocals (10)

=== Production ===
- Jennifer Warnes – producer
- Rob Fraboni – producer
- Tim Kramer – engineer
- Phil Chapman – additional engineer
- Wayne Neuendorf – additional engineer
- Mike Nosker – assistant engineer
- Ken Perry – mastering at Capitol Mastering (Hollywood, California)
- John Kosh – art direction, design
- David Alexander – photography
