= Peter McCann =

American musician and songwriter (1948–2023)

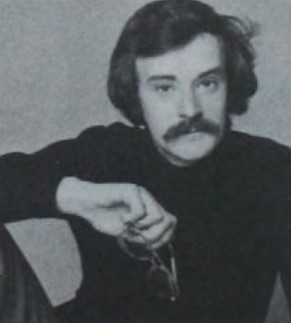
- McCann promotional shot, 1977

Background information
- Born: Peter James McCann; March 6, 1948; Bridgeport, Connecticut, U.S.
- Died: January 26, 2023 (aged 74) Nashville, Tennessee, U.S.
- Genres: Pop, soft rock
- Occupation: Singer-songwriter
- Instruments: Vocals, piano, guitar
- Years active: 1971–2023
- Labels: 20th Century, Columbia
- Formerly of: The Repairs

Peter James McCann (March 6, 1948 – January 26, 2023) was an American songwriter, musician, lecturer, and songwriters' activist. He was known for writing successful pop-rock and country songs, including his 1977 solo hit "Do You Wanna Make Love", and "Right Time of the Night" for Jennifer Warnes.

At Fairfield University, McCann founded folk-rock group the Repairs, for which he served as guitarist, keyboardist, vocalist, and songwriter. He moved to Los Angeles in 1971 to record with the Repairs under the Motown label, and then was signed to ABC Records as a staff writer. McCann moved to Nashville in 1987 and began a long career as a staff writer and occasional recording artist. McCann also spent upwards of 25 years lobbying for songwriters' rights in Washington, giving lectures on copyright law in several institutes of higher education across the United States.

During his career, McCann had been signed as a recording artist to Motown, 20th Century Fox, CBS Records and RCA Records. His songs have been recorded by Lynn Anderson, Paul Anka, Karen Carpenter, Shaun Cassidy, Crystal Gayle, Mickey Gilley, Lee Greenwood, Whitney Houston, Julio Iglesias, Jermaine Jackson, Michael Johnson, Nicolette Larson, Kathy Mattea, Reba McEntire, Michael McDonald, Anne Murray, Ricky Nelson, The Oak Ridge Boys, K.T. Oslin, Donny Osmond, Buck Owens, Kenny Rogers, Ricky Skaggs, John Travolta, Bobby Vinton, Shelly West, among others.

== Early life ==
McCann was born in Bridgeport, Connecticut, on March 6, 1948. He was the son of Donal George McCann, the music minister, organist and choirmaster at St. James Roman Catholic Church in Stratford, Connecticut, and Amelia Teresa McCann (née Hennigan), a homemaker. McCann was of Irish, German, Eastern European, and Swedish descent. Donald, who held a master's degree in Gregorian Chant, taught at Fairfield Woods Middle School in Fairfield, Connecticut, and his eight children, all of whom were members of his St. James church choir, rehearsed weekly and sang in Sunday services, weddings, and funerals. Amelia was a pianist and a good singer who knew how to read sheet music, though she scarcely played in the house.

The McCanns were raised Roman Catholic and received a Catholic education from Sacred Heart Grammar School in Bridgeport, taught by the Sisters of Mercy. Peter went on to Notre Dame High School in Fairfield, taught by the Holy Cross Fathers, and graduated in 1970 with a Bachelor of Arts in History at Fairfield University, a Jesuit-run institution, specializing in the history of colonial America, the Tudors, and the first five emperors of Rome.

In his freshman year at Fairfield University, McCann, a baritone, met fellow singers George Mathias, bass Emmett Kelly, and tenors Jim Higgins and Sebastian Fiori, all of whom joined the Glee club, with Jim taking the part sung by former member Michael McCann, Peter's older brother. At the time, it was rare for a freshman like Peter, attending Fairfield University on a scholarship, to make it into the Glee club as a freshman. The Glee club hosted several variety shows at which members alternated from barbershop quartet formation, the Bensonians, to a 12-man group, similar to the Yale Whiffenpoofs.

== Career ==
=== The Repairs ===
Eventually, he met students Larry Treadwell, a Hendrix-inspired electric guitarist; Jim Honeycutt, a folk guitarist and singer; and Mike Foley, a rugby player who had picked up the bass. Peter began writing songs, influenced by folk music like the Kingston Trio and the skiffle music played by Easton, Connecticut native band the Jackson Pike Skifflers, led by his sister Katie's husband Will Tressler. Led by Peter as a songwriter, keyboardist, electric guitarist, and vocalist, the students founded the folk-rock band the Repairs, which also featured drummer Timothy "Ace" Holleran and Jim's wife Sukie Honeycutt on vocals.

In 1971, the band accidentally stumbled into Andrew Loog Oldham, producer of the Rolling Stones, who got the band signed to Motown and convinced the band to move to LA, where he produced two of their albums, Already A Household Word (1971) and Repairs (1972). During this time, Peter was continually writing songs, influenced by Paul Simon, Joni Mitchell, Billy Joel, and Paul McCartney, among others. Torn between attending law school and pursuing a career as a songwriter, McCann's father encouraged him to follow his dream. One year after the release of the group's 1974 live album, Repairs Live, McCann got signed to ABC Records as a staff writer.

=== LA years ===
After roughly a year without high-profile songs, McCann's prospects looked sour. However, his big break came when he wrote the song "Right Time of the Night", personally chosen by infamous A&R man and former Columbia Records president Clive Davis as Jennifer Warnes’ debut single. It went on to chart No. 6 on the Billboard Hot 100, No. 1 on the Billboard Easy Listening Chart, and No. 17 on the Billboard Hot Country Singles chart. It was the 34th highest song on the 1977 Billboard Year-End Hot 100 Chart, above "Blinded by the Light" by Manfred Mann's Earth Band and "Dreams" by Fleetwood Mac.

This success prompted his signing to 20th Century Fox Records, who released his self-penned single "Do You Wanna Make Love" in 1977. The single—produced by Hal Yoergler, Vice President of ABC Dunhill Music Publishing—was an international hit and sold over two million units. It reached No. 5 on the U.S. Billboard Hot 100 and No. 22 on the Adult Contemporary Chart. It was the 17th highest song on the 1977 Year-End Hot 100, eclipsing Eagles' "Hotel California" and Stevie Wonder's "Sir Duke". It also reached high chart positions in Canada, Australia, New Zealand, and South Africa. His 1977 debut album, Peter McCann, reached No. 82 on the Billboard 200.

=== Nashville years ===
In 1978 CBS, now Sony Music, purchased his contract from the Fox organization and began a fruitful, 20-year relation with him as a songwriter in Nashville, Tennessee.

When McCann first moved to Nashville, he didn't know how to read sheet music and had only written songs alone; he didn't know how to collaborate with others. He learned quickly enough through a process he dubbed “publisher cross-polarization,” writing with as many people as possible for profit, all “hoping St. Nicholas soon would be there” in the form of a hit song. McCann recalled all the writers had the attitude that they “knew how to write a song and didn't need to practice. If you didn't catch fire, we stopped, and didn't want to waste energy writing an insufficient song”. McCann first saw the value of collaboration after talking with Walter Becker of Steely Dan in the mid-70s; both signed to ABC at the time. Walter played him an original song, "Android Warehouse", and McCann asked him why he needed to write with his partner Donald Fagen, as the song was already good enough. Becker answered, “Well, I don't know how to start a song, and he doesn't know how to finish one!”

The first songwriter he collaborated with was Richard Leigh, known for his Grammy Award-winning Country Song “Don't It Make My Brown Eyes Blue” for Crystal Gayle. Although the pair were both learned in composition and lyric-writing, Peter was more lyric-oriented, while Richard was more melody-oriented. They’d try writing something in the morning; if it were working, they’d have lunch and go back; if not, they’d go out to the bar and complete the next session. Eventually, publishers started telling him that he'd “forgotten how to write a bad song.” Nevertheless, Peter wanted to write great songs, as those were the ones that sold. The Leigh-McCann collaboration gleaned the country song “Wall of Tears”, recorded by K.T. Oslin and later Frances Black. Although it was only a moderate success on the US Country Charts, No. 40, it was huge in Ireland, where it sold 1 million copies (out of a population of only 3.5 million).

By this time, McCann was a successful Nashville songwriter. He had written 55 songs in his first year in Nashville. In a bar, he met Harlan Howard, one of the most enduring and successful country songwriters of all time. Harlan told him he “needed to go back to LA,” saying, “every one of those chart positions is mine, and you're molestin’ my hunt.” Eventually, Harlan warmed up to him. Peter recalled Harlan told him that country music was “three chords and the truth.” He joked that after much pleading, he convinced Harlan to let him add an extra chord to the song “All I Want for Christmas Is You” in 1982. McCann often joked that they wish you could copyright a song title, referencing Mariah Carey's hit single by the same name.

McCann's hits in country music include the Grammy-nominated performance "She's Single Again" by Janie Fricke and the No. 1, "Nobody Falls Like a Fool" by Earl Thomas Conley. In 1991, Baillie and the Boys had a hit with "Treat Me Like a Stranger". McCann also had a song on one of the largest selling female debut albums of all time (Whitney Houston) when Whitney Houston recorded his song "Take Good Care of My Heart". His song "The Star" appeared on Kathy Mattea's Grammy winning Christmas album. Isaac Hayes and Millie Jackson took their hit duet version of "Do You Wanna Make Love" up the R&B chart.

In 2012, McCann concluded a three-year contract with GrandVista Music in Nashville as a staff writer.

=== Songwriters' rights activism ===
Throughout his career McCann was active for the rights of songwriters and publishers, lecturing for NSAI, SESAC, ASCAP, and BMI. He also lectured at the University of Southern California, UC Santa Barbara, George Washington University Law School, University of Tennessee Law School, Belmont University and Vanderbilt University, the latter at which he taught gratis music classes for the students. In his later years, he lobbied pro bono in Washington, D.C., on copyright issues. McCann was a vice-president and board member of NSAI.

Being influential in several PRO circles, McCann was among the people pushing for Bob Dylan to receive the Nobel Prize for literature. He also pushed for Paul Simon to receive the honor. One time, Peter ran into Paul, inquiring on the fact that there had been legal action taken against him, to which he replied “you're nobody until somebody sues you."

== Personal life and death ==
On the morning of January 26, 2023, McCann died in his sleep at his Nashville home. He was 74. McCann was survived by his wife and son.

== Commendations ==
In 1995 he won NSAI's President's Choice award for his work in copyright protection.

In May 1999, then Attorney General Janet Reno presented McCann with the Volunteerism Award from the National Center for Missing and Exploited Children, for composing "Among the Missing" as an anthem for the Center's free use. Alongside co-producers George Massenburg and Gary Paczosa, he produced the video, arranged the strings, and co-produced the recording of the song, performed by Michael McDonald and Kathy Mattea.

In 1995, McCann released a Christmas album of his own compositions on RCA Records, of which one of the songs, "One Voice", received critical acclaim and a letter of commendation from Pope John Paul II.

In 2003, he won a special commendation from SESAC for his continuing efforts to strengthen the nation's copyright laws.

== Discography ==
=== Albums ===
Year	Album	Billboard 200	Record label
1977	Peter McCann	82	20th Century Records
1979	One on One	—	Columbia Records

=== Singles ===
Year	Title	Peak chart positions			Record Label	B-side	Album
Year	Title	US	US AC	AUS	Record Label	B-side	Album
1977	"Do You Wanna Make Love"	5	22	11	20th Century; Records	"Right Time of the Night"	Peter McCann
1977	"Save Me Your Love"	—	—	—	20th Century; Records	"It's Easy"	Peter McCann
1979	"Just One Woman"	122*	—	—	Columbia; Records	"Come by Here"	One on One
1979	"Don't Take It out on Me"	—	—	—	Columbia; Records	"What's He Got"	One on One
1982	"Dream Lover"	—	—	—	Columbia; Records	"She's a Woman"	Carnival of Life
1982	"Do It Over"	—	—	—	Columbia; Records	"She's a Woman"	Carnival of Life

- *Record World Singles Chart.

=== Notable charted singles written by Peter McCann ===
Year	Artist	Title	Peak chart positions					Album
Year	Artist	Title	US	US AC	US Country	US R&B	UK	Album
1976	Stark & McBrien	"If You Like the Music (Suicide and Vine)"	—	17	—	—	—	
1977	David Wills	"Do You Wanna Make Love"	—	—	82	—	—	
1977	Jennifer Warnes	"Right Time of the Night"	6	1	17	—	51	Jennifer Warnes
1979	Buck Owens	"Do You Wanna Make Love"	—	—	80	—	—	
1980	Millie Jackson/ Isaac Hayes	"Do You Wanna Make Love"	—	—	—	30	—	Royal Rappin's
1985	Earl Thomas Conley	"Nobody Falls Like a Fool"	—	—	1	—	—	
1985	Janie Fricke	"She's Single Again"	—	—	2	—	—	Somebody Else's Fire
1987	Louise Mandrell	"Do I Have to Say Goodbye"	—	—	28	—	—	Dreamin'
1987	Pake McEntire	"Too Old to Grow Up Now"	—	—	46	—	—	Too Old to Grow Up Now
1987	K. T. Oslin	"Wall of Tears"	—	—	40	—	—	80's Ladies
1988	Mickey Gilley	"She Reminded Me of You"	—	—	23	—	—	Chasing Rainbows
1991	Baillie & the Boys	"Treat Me Like a Stranger"	—	—	18	—	—	The Lights of Home
