= Hot (American vocal group) =

American vocal trio

- Origin: Los Angeles, California, U.S.
- Genres: Soul
- Years active: 1976–1980
- Labels: Big Tree, Boardwalk
- Past members: Gwen Owens; Cathy Carson; Juanita Curiel

Hot was a vocal trio based in Los Angeles, California, whose membership was Gwen Owens (born June 19, 1953), Cathy Carson (née Catherine Sue Fiebach) (October 8, 1953 – June 26, 2014), and Juanita Curiel (born February 25, 1953). The group had a million-selling hit single in 1977 entitled "Angel in Your Arms".

== History ==
Lead singer Gwen Owens was a native of Detroit, where she had begun singing in church, and after being discovered at a high-school talent show, she recorded for local record labels from the mid-1960s. In 1969, a track she had recorded, "Keep on Living", was picked up by Josie Records and reached #40 on the Billboard Best Selling Soul Singles Chart. Owens also performed in local concerts mostly headlined by Motown artists such as Marvin Gaye, Stevie Wonder, the Originals, and Edwin Starr; she also performed with Al Green.

Relocating to Los Angeles in the early 1970s, Owens began a session singing career backing David Axelrod, Randy Brown, Coke Escovedo, Willie Hutch, Billy Preston, and Al Wilson; she provided live support for Ann-Margret, Jose Feliciano, the O'Jays, Lou Rawls, Nancy Sinatra, and Raquel Welch. In 1972, Owens was signed to a production contract with Muscle Shoals Sound Studio session men Clayton Ivey and Terry Woodford, who recorded Owens at Muscle Shoals as the inaugural artist for a projected southern division of Motown Records. Ultimately Motown decided not to proceed with "Motown South", dropping Owens. Her five completed Muscle Shoals tracks were shopped to other labels, with the newly formed Casablanca Records picking up the tracks "You Better Watch Out" and "Everybody Needs Love" for release in 1973; the same single was re-issued in 1974 on Warner Bros. Records - then a Casablanca affiliate - without commercial success.

In 1975 Owens and Cathy Carson, a native of Kansas, began performing in a trio completed by Irene Cathaway (née Passos) who was born in Phoenix, Arizona of Mexican heritage; this outfit toured with the Wolfman Jack Shock & Rock Review under the name Sweet Talk and, in 1976, appeared on television on The Diahann Carroll Show and Cos, billed on the latter show as Sugar & Spice.

== Hot: inception and chart success ==
Owens had remained signed with Ivey and Woodford but, as Motown was not interested in Owens, Ivey and Woodford were unable to record her until after ending their affiliation with the label in 1976. At this point, Ivey and Woodford opened their own Muscle Shoals recording facility, Wishbone Studios, where the trio of Owens, Carson, and Cathaway were the intended inaugural act. According to Owens, Cathaway, who had previous obligations, was unable to attend the trio's scheduled recording session, and as a result Owens and Carson recorded the track "Angel in Your Arms" as a duo prior to the Mexican-born Juanita Curiel, who had grown up in Nevada and spent three years as a singer/dancer in Wayne Newton's Vegas show, being recruited to return the group - eventually dubbed Hot - to trio status. Ivey was the keyboardist and Mac McAnally played guitar.

"Angel in Your Arms," which Ivey and Woodford had written with local songwriter Tommy Brasfield, was given to the group to record after Gwen Owens asked if they could record a C&W song. Picked up by Big Tree Records for release, "Angel in Your Arms" broke in Florida in February 1977, debuting that month on the Billboard Hot 100 at #97, gradually accruing sufficient airplay to enter the Pop Top 40 that April and proceed to number 6 that July. The track also charted R&B (#29) and Easy Listening (#9). Certified a RIAA certification gold record for U.S. sales of one million units, "Angel in Your Arms" was also a hit for Hot in Australia (#27), Canada (#3), and New Zealand (#7).

== Hot: later career ==
Although Hot's membership — the African-American Owens, the white Carson, and the Hispanic Curiel — had assembled on the assumption that this multiracial personnel would attract attention, the group received little noticeable promotion, beyond their million-selling single "Angel in Your Arms". The single's success briefly boosted its parent album Hot on to the charts with a #125 peak, and two other tracks released as singles appeared in the lower half of the Hot 100: "Right Feeling at the Wrong Time" and "You Brought the Woman Out of Me" (the latter a minor hit for Evie Sands in 1975).

Hot had two more album releases, both recorded at Wishbone Studios with Ivey and Woodford producing, before Big Tree Records was closed by its parent company, Atlantic Records, in 1980. Woodford & Ivey also produced a solo single by Owens, "I Don't Want to Dance No More / Hold Me Like You Never Had Me", released on Big Tree in 1979. Owens and Carson performed background vocals on the 1978 Ann Sexton album The Beginning — in a chorale which also featured Terry Woodford and veteran Muscle Shoals session singer/ songwriter Ava Aldridge — while Owens, Carson, and Curiel provided vocals on two tracks on the 1979 Stanley Clarke album I Wanna Play For You. Owens also provided background vocals on the 1978 Ben E. King album Let Me in Your Life and the 1980 Randy Crawford album Now We May Begin.

In 1980 Owens, Carson, and Curiel starred in a B-movie about a female vocal group alternately known as Makin It, Runnin' Hot, and Smokey and the Judge. The movie features most of the songs from the group's 1980 Strong Together album. Also in 1980, a song co-written by Curiel (with Phyllis Brown) entitled "Strength of a Woman" was recorded by Eloise Laws for her self-titled album, with the track reaching #33 (R&B) in single release: the song would later be recorded by The Carpenters for their 1981 album Made in America.

In 1982 Boardwalk Records released the single "Tonight" credited to Hot; of the original lineup, only Curiel's participation can be verified.

In 1984, Owens, Carson, and Curiel made it to the finals in the Vocal Group category of the inaugural season of Star Search, coming in second to country-rock band Sawyer Brown.

In 1987 Owens and Curiel attempted to revive Hot with a projected new third member, Sandra Starks, whom Owens had met when Owens and Starks had both been session singers on the Lou Rawls album Family Reunion. Owens, Curiel, and Starks entered into separate negotiations with both Maurice White of Earth, Wind & Fire and Barry White, ultimately with no evident result.

== Members' later history ==
Gwen Owens released "You Better Watch Out", written by Clayton Ivey and Terry Woodford, as a single in 1974. After returning to session work, Owens retired as a professional musician, but remained active, singing in her local church in the San Fernando Valley in California. In 1999 she and three fellow choir members formed the group Melodious, whose CD Ephesian 5:19 was released in 2004. In 2008, Owens was reported to be employed in the music industry in a non-performing capacity, working for HDH Records.

In 1978 Cathy Carson married Raphael "Ray" Stein (b. 1952) who became a member of Hot's touring band. By 1990, Carson and her two daughters by Stein had settled in Tulsa, Oklahoma, with Carson's second husband, musician Kenneth Dale Weidenbach (1949–2010). Subsequent to her 1996 divorce from Weidenbach, Carson returned with her daughters to her home town of Wichita, Kansas, where she died of lung cancer in 2014. Her obituary identified her as "Catherine Weidenbach" and described her as a legal secretary.

Juanita Curiel became a licensed hypnotherapist whose practice opened in Las Vegas, Nevada, in 1998.

== Discography ==
=== Albums ===
- Hot (Big Tree Records, 1977) U.S. #125, U.S. R&B Albums #28
- If That's the Way You Want It...You Got It (Big Tree, 1978)
- Strong Together (Big Tree, 1980)

=== Singles ===
Year	Title	Chart positions					
Year	Title	US	US R&B	US AC	AUS	CA	NZ
1977	"Angel in Your Arms"	6	29	9	27	3	7
1977	"The Right Feeling at the Wrong Time"	65	58	-	-	-	-
1978	"You Brought the Woman Out of Me"	71	-	-	-	-	-

Gwen Owens solo recordings

- A: Mystery Man B: Someone To Love Oncore 1964
- A: I Lost A Good Thing B: I'll Be Crying Velgo USA VO-001 1966
- A: Just Say You're Wanted (And Needed) / B: Still True To You Velgo USA VO-002 1967
- A: Make Him Mine / B: One More Day Lau-Reen USA 1002 1968
- A: Keep On Living / B: It Ain't Hardly Over Josie USA 45-1009 Jul 1969
- A: You Better Watch Out / B: Everybody Needs Love Casablanca USA NB 808 Oct 1974
- A: I Don't Want To Dance No More / B: Hold Me Like You Never Had Me Big Tree 1979
