= Jennifer Warnes =

American musician (born 1947)

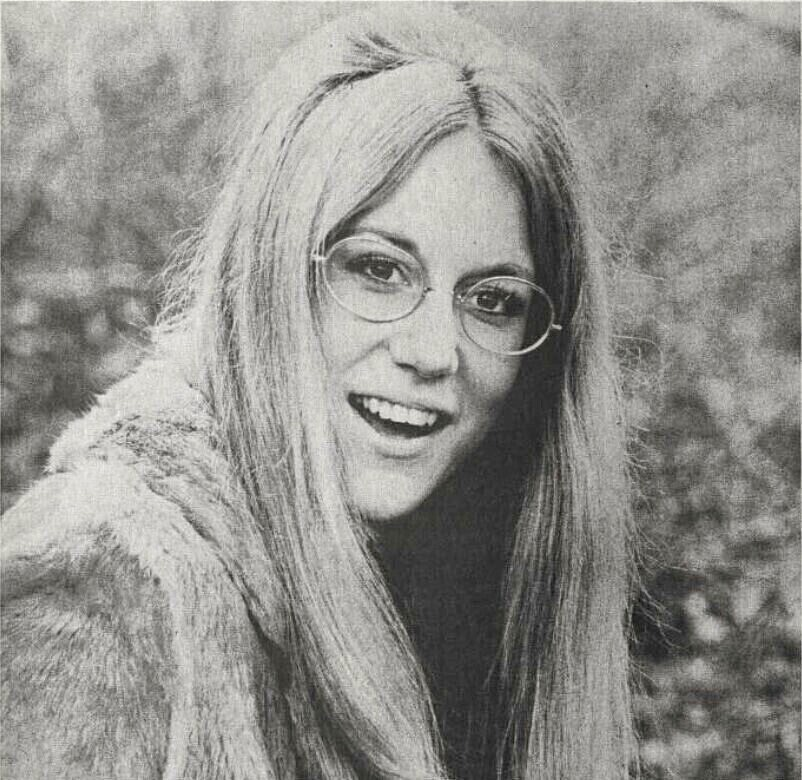
- Warnes c. 1970

Background information
- Born: Jennifer Jean Warnes; March 3, 1947 (age 79); Seattle, Washington, U.S.
- Origin: Anaheim, California, U.S.
- Genres: Country rock; pop
- Occupations: Singer; songwriter
- Instrument: Vocals
- Years active: 1967–present
- Labels: Arista; Cisco; Impex; Cypress; Private Music; Shout Factory; Reprise; Parrot; BMG
- Website: jenniferwarnes.com

Jennifer Jean Warnes (born March 3, 1947) is an American singer and songwriter who has performed as a vocalist on a number of film soundtracks. She has won two Grammy Awards, in 1983 for the Joe Cocker duet "Up Where We Belong", and in 1987 for the Bill Medley duet "(I've Had) The Time of My Life". Warnes also collaborated closely with Leonard Cohen.

== Early life ==
Warnes was born on March 3, 1947, in Seattle, Washington and raised in Anaheim, California. Her desire and ability to sing came early; at age seven, Warnes was offered her first recording contract, which her father declined. Warnes sang in church and local pageants until age 17, when she was offered an opera scholarship to Immaculate Heart College. Warnes was so committed to her Catholic faith that she entered a convent for a while after graduating from high school.

Warnes chose to sing folk music as it became popularized by Joan Baez in the mid-1960s. In 1968, after a few years with musical theatre and clubs, she signed with Parrot Records (a London Records subsidiary) and recorded her first album. That year, Warnes joined the cast of the television show The Smothers Brothers Comedy Hour.

Early in her career, industry advisors suggested Warnes change her name to "Warren", but then realized that there was already an actress named Jennifer Warren, so she performed briefly as simply 'Jennifer', though she was credited as Jennifer Warren when she provided duet vocals for the singer-guitarist Mason Williams on his 1968 album, The Mason Williams Ear Show. However, Warnes soon returned to her birth name.

In November 1968, Warnes (as "Jennifer Warren") portrayed the female lead in the Los Angeles, California, production of the stage musical Hair. She had a related UK single release as "Jennifer" on London HLU 10278 in June 1969 with "Let The Sunshine In" and "Easy to Be Hard", licensed from the US Parrot label. Warnes' fellow Hair castmate Bert Sommer wrote a song inspired by her entitled "Jennifer," and performed it at Woodstock.

== Career ==
=== 1970s ===
In 1971, Warnes met Canadian songwriter and poet Leonard Cohen, and the two remained friends. She toured Europe with Cohen's band in 1972 and 1979 — first as a back-up singer and then as a vocal arranger and guest singer on Cohen's albums Live Songs (1973), Recent Songs (1979), Various Positions (1985), I'm Your Man (1988), The Future (1992), Field Commander Cohen: Tour of 1979 (2001), and Old Ideas (2012). Warnes also recorded a critically acclaimed album of Cohen songs, Famous Blue Raincoat, in 1987.

In 1972, Warnes released her third album, Jennifer, which was produced by John Cale. It was unavailable after the LP was deleted, until it was finally reissued in Japan in 2013 (Reprise WPCR-14865). Four years later, Warnes released the album Jennifer Warnes (Arista 4062), which contained her breakthrough single, "Right Time of the Night", which hit number 1 on Billboard's Easy Listening (Adult Contemporary) chart in April 1977 and number 6 on the Billboard Hot 100 chart in May 1977.

Warnes recorded the song "It Goes Like It Goes" for the 1979 motion picture Norma Rae. The song won the Academy Award for Best Original Song. Her 1979 single "I Know A Heartache When I See One", was a Top 10 Country hit and reached the Top 20 on both the Pop and Adult Contemporary charts.

=== 1980s ===
Warnes recorded the Randy Newman composition "One More Hour" for the 1981 motion picture Ragtime. This became her second song performance nominated for the Academy Award for Best Original Song.

Warnes teamed up with Joe Cocker to record "Up Where We Belong" for the 1982 motion picture An Officer and a Gentleman. Written by Buffy Sainte-Marie, Will Jennings, and Jack Nitzsche, the song won the Academy Award for Best Original Song, as well as a Golden Globe Award. "Up Where We Belong" also won Warnes and Cocker the Grammy Award for Best Pop Performance by a Duo or Group with Vocal, which was released as a single and hit No. 1 (for three weeks running) on the Billboard Hot 100 chart. It was certified platinum for over two million sales in the United States. That same year, she recorded James Taylor's "Millworker" for the American Playhouse PBS production of Working.

In 1985, Warner recorded a duet version with B. J. Thomas of the song "As Long As We Got Each Other", the theme for the TV show Growing Pains. It was used as the opening theme for the second and third seasons. For the fourth season, the song was once again re-recorded with Thomas and Dusty Springfield. However, Warnes' version made its return for the fifth season and the seventh (final) season of the show. The same year, she recorded vocals for Leonard Cohen's record Various Positions, getting equal vocals credits with Cohen in the inside booklet. After releasing a praised tribute LP of Leonard Cohen's songs in 1987, Famous Blue Raincoat, to which Cohen contributed two new compositions, "First We Take Manhattan", which featured Stevie Ray Vaughan on guitar, and "Ain't No Cure for Love", she contributed vocals to Cohen's 1988 hit LP I'm Your Man, most notably to "Take This Waltz" and "Tower of Song".

In 1986, Warnes assisted with backing vocals on Eric Johnson's Tones album. She teamed with Bill Medley to record "(I've Had) The Time of My Life" for the 1987 motion picture Dirty Dancing. This marked the third song performed by Warnes to win the Academy Award for Best Original Song and second for the Golden Globe Award in the same category. The song also won Warnes and Medley the Grammy Award for Duo or Group with Vocal. It reached No. 1 on the Billboard Hot 100 and spent four consecutive weeks at No. 1 on the Adult Contemporary chart. On September 30, 1987, at the Coconut Grove in Los Angeles, Warnes contributed vocals for Roy Orbison's star-studded television special Roy Orbison and Friends, A Black and White Night.

=== 1990s to present ===
In 1991, Warnes recorded the Lennon-McCartney song "Golden Slumbers" as a duet with Jackson Browne, included in the album For Our Children which was released by Disney as a benefit for the Pediatric AIDS Foundation. She released her seventh studio album, The Hunter, in June 1992. The LP featured the AC No. 13 single "Rock You Gently", and also featured the track "Way Down Deep" co-written by Warnes and Leonard Cohen. Warnes recorded the track "Cold Enough To Snow" for the 1993 film, Life With Mikey.

In August 2007, the Shout Factory Records label re-released the 20th anniversary edition of Famous Blue Raincoat with a 24-page booklet and four additional songs. The Hunter was re-released in 2009, and The Well was re-released in September 2010. All remasters were issued on high quality vinyl and 24K gold discs. The Hunter was released without bonus material. The re-released The Well, however, contains a total of 14 tracks. These include two previously unreleased recordings from the original session: "La Luna Brilla", "A Fool for the Look (in Your Eyes)", and one extra bonus selection, "Show Me the Light" (a second duet with Bill Medley, which was originally featured on the 1998 movie soundtrack Rudolph the Red-Nosed Reindeer: The Movie).

In 2018, Warnes released her first album since 2001, Another Time, Another Place. The first cut from the new album, "Just Breathe" was released on March 1, 2018. Written by Eddie Vedder, the song was originally recorded by Pearl Jam. The album includes 10 tracks, among them a new version of "So Sad" by Mickey Newbury, "I Am The Big Easy" by Ray Bonneville, "Once I Was Loved" by John Legend, "Why Worry" by Mark Knopfler, and "The Boys And Me" by Warnes herself and Michael Smotherman.

== Discography ==
=== Albums ===
Year	Album	Peak chart positions					Label
Year	Album	US	US Country	AUS	CAN	UK	Label
1968	I Can Remember Everything	—	—	—	—	—	Parrot
1969	See Me, Feel Me, Touch Me, Heal Me	—	—	—	—	—	Parrot
1972	Jennifer	—	—	—	—	—	Reprise
1976	Jennifer Warnes	43	—	92	26	—	Arista
1979	Shot Through the Heart	94	13	—	—	—	Arista
1986	Famous Blue Raincoat	72	—	21	8	33	Cypress
1992	The Hunter	—	—	—	76	—	Private Music
2001	The Well	—	—	—	—	—	Music Force/Cisco
2018	Another Time, Another Place	—	—	—	—	—	BMG Rights Management

=== Compilation albums ===
- Best of Jennifer Warnes (Arista, 1982) – US No. 47
- Just Jennifer (Deram, 1992)
- Best: First We Take Manhattan (unauthorized German compilation, 2000)
- Platinum and Gold Collection (2004) – with errors in actual tracks, not Warnes singing; recalled
- Love Lifts Us Up: A Collection 1968–83 (Raven, 2004)

=== Singles ===
Year	Title	Peak chart positions								Album
Year	Title	US	US AC	US Country	AUS	CAN	CAN AC	CAN Country	UK	Album
1969	"Easy to Be Hard"	128	—	—	—	—	—	—	—	See Me, Feel Me, Touch Me, Heal Me
1976	"Right Time of the Night"	6	1	17	33	3	1	18	54 (Note: Chart position is from the official UK "Breakers List".)	Jennifer Warnes
1977	"I'm Dreaming"	50	9	—	—	67	6	—	—	Jennifer Warnes
1979	"I Know a Heartache When I See One"	19	14	10	—	46	—	12	—	Shot Through the Heart
1979	"Don't Make Me Over"	67	36	84	—	—	—	—	—	Shot Through the Heart
1980	"When the Feeling Comes Around"	45	15	—	—	—	—	—	—	Shot Through the Heart
1981	"Could It Be Love"	47	13	57	—	—	—	—	—	The Best of Jennifer Warnes
1982	"Come to Me"	107	40	—	—	—	—	—	—	The Best of Jennifer Warnes
1982	"Up Where We Belong" (duet with Joe Cocker)	1	3	—	1	1	2	—	7	An Officer and a Gentleman
1983	"Nights Are Forever"	105	8	—	—	—	—	—	—	Twilight Zone
1983	"All the Right Moves" (duet with Chris Thompson)	85	19	—	—	—	5	—	—	All the Right Moves (soundtrack)
1987	"Simply Meant to Be" (duet with Gary Morris)	—	—	—	—	—	—	—	—	Blind Date
1987	"Ain't No Cure for Love"	—	—	86	—	23	1	17	—	Famous Blue Raincoat
1987	"First We Take Manhattan"	—	29	—	32	43	6	—	74	Famous Blue Raincoat
1987	"Bird on the Wire"	—	—	—	—	—	16	—	—	Famous Blue Raincoat
1987	"(I've Had) The Time of My Life" (duet with Bill Medley)	1	1	—	1	1	3	—	6	Dirty Dancing
1992	"Rock You Gently"	—	13	—	—	50	7	—	—	The Hunter
1992	"True Emotion"	—	43	—	—	—	—	—	—	The Hunter
1993	"The Whole of the Moon"	—	49	—	—	—	—	—	—	The Hunter

=== Other media appearances ===
Year	Song / Album
1973	David Blue, Nice Baby and the Angel (vocals)
1979	With Steve Gillette, "Lost the Good Thing We Had" on A Little Warmth. No. 76 on Billboard Country Chart in 1980.
1981	James Taylor, Dad Loves His Work (vocals)
1982	Bert Jansch, Heartbreak
1988	Harry Belafonte, Paradise in Gazankulu
1988	Roy Orbison and Friends, A Black and White Night (TV special)
1989	With David Benoit, "When the Winter's Gone (Song for a Stranger)"/"Urban Daydreams"
1991	Tanita Tikaram, Everybody's Angel (vocals)
1994	"Up Where We Belong" (live version with Joe Cocker) – Grammy's Greatest Moments Volume III
1995	Tanita Tikaram, Lovers in the City (vocals)

== Awards and nominations ==
Year	Association	Category	Nominated work	Result
1983	Grammy Award	Best Pop Performance by a Duo or Group with Vocals	"Up Where We Belong" with Joe Cocker	Won
1988	Grammy Award	Best Pop Performance by a Duo or Group with Vocals	"(I've Had) The Time of My Life" with Bill Medley	Won
