= List of RPM number-one adult contemporary singles of 1977 =

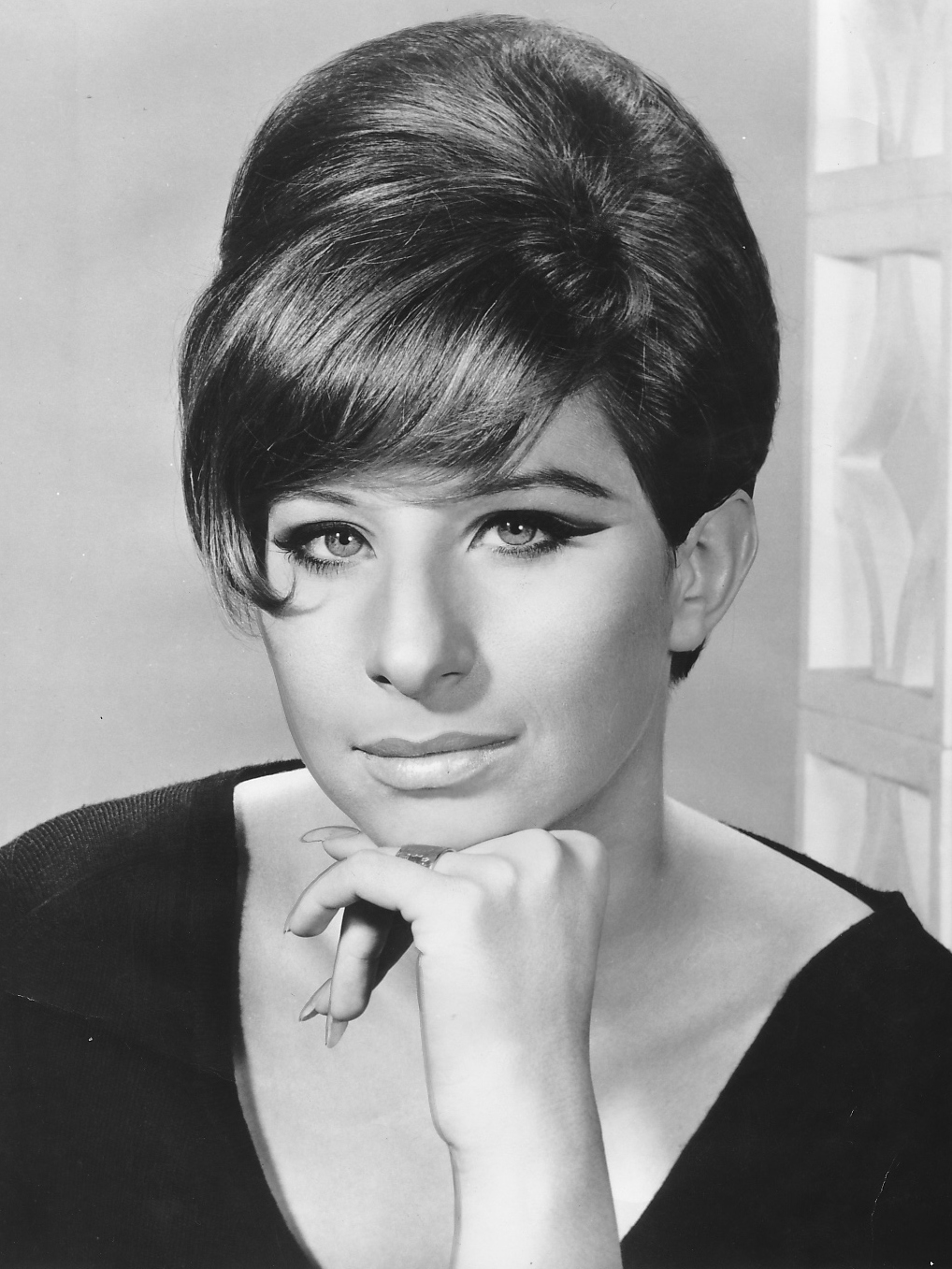
Barbra Streisand spent three weeks at number one with "Evergreen (Love Theme from A Star Is Born)" and "My Heart Belongs to Me.

In 1977, RPM magazine published a chart for top-performing singles in the easy listening or adult contemporary categories in Canada. The chart, entitled MOR Playlist from January to April and Adult Oriented Playlist for the rest of 1977, has undergone numerous name changes, becoming Contemporary Adult in 1981 and became Adult Contemporary in 1984 until the magazine's final publication in November 2000. In 1977, thirty-eight individual singles reached number one in the chart, which contains 50 positions. The first number-one in 1977 was "Sorry Seems to Be the Hardest Word" by English musician Elton John, continuing from the 1976 charts, and the last was "Sweet Music Man" by American country singer Kenny Rogers, previously with the band The First Edition. Twenty acts have their first number-one in the chart in 1977: Mary MacGregor, Marilyn McCoo, Billy Davis Jr., Gene Cotton, Kenny Nolan, David Soul, Parker McGee, Jennifer Warnes, Yvonne Elliman, Kenny Rogers (as solo from the First Edition), Andy Gibb, The Raes, Crystal Gayle, Stephen Bishop, Meco, Firefall, Debby Boone, Rita Coolidge, Judy Collins and Dolly Parton. Two Canadian acts, Enrico Farino and the Raes had at least one number-one that year.

Barbra Streisand spent the most weeks at number one in 1977, totalling six weeks with "Evergreen (Love Theme from A Star Is Born)" and "My Heart Belongs to Me", which both spent three weeks at number one. The American soft rock band Bread, which disbanded in 1973 and reformed in 1977, spent a total of four weeks at number one in the chart with the singles "Lost Without Your Love" and "Hooked on You", both from Lost Without Your Love, their last studio album before disbanding again. Three artists, Barry Manilow, Kenny Rogers and David Soul, had a total of three weeks at number one.

== Chart history ==
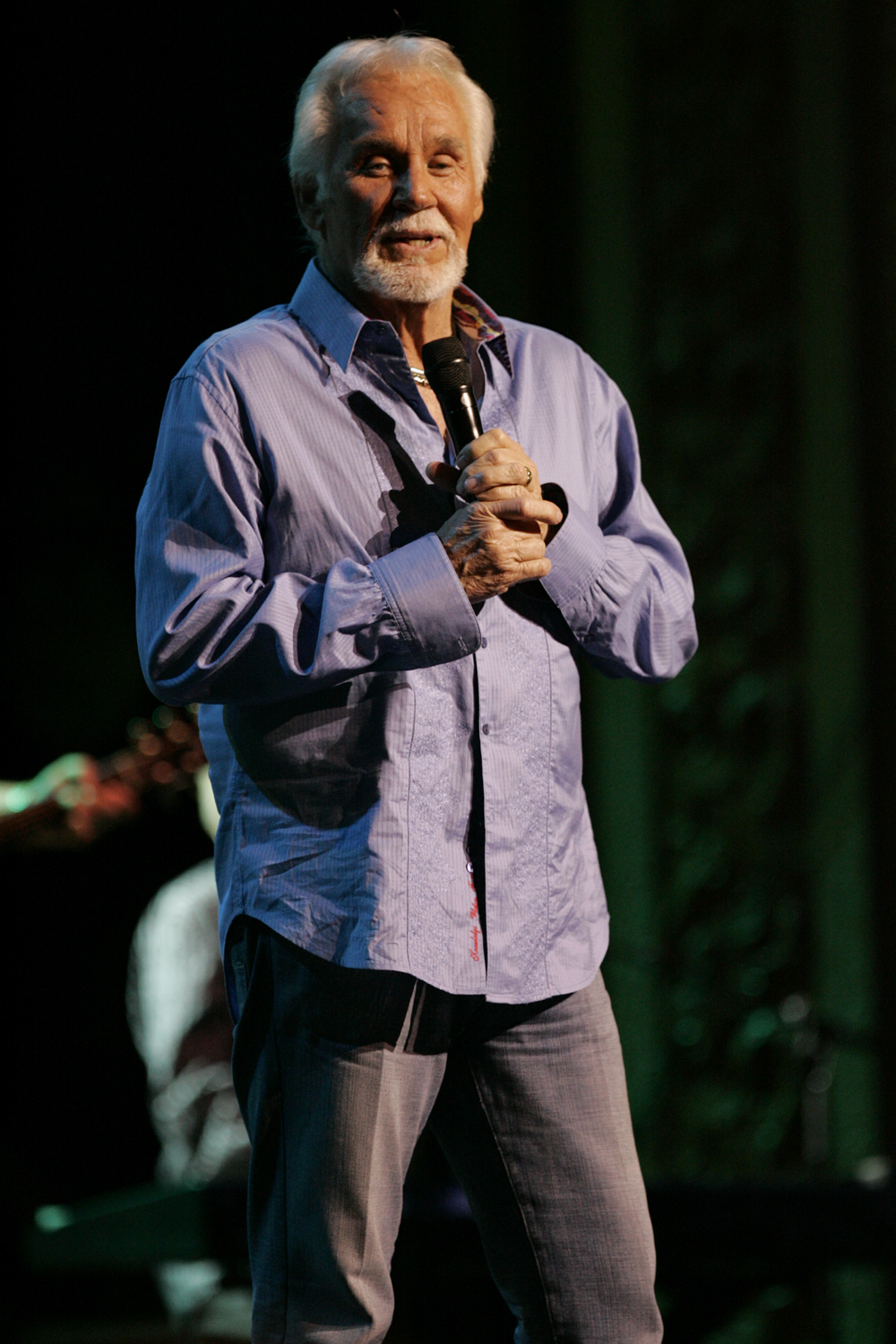
Kenny Rogers, as a solo artist outside The First Edition, had the most number-one hits in the chart in 1977, with three singles.

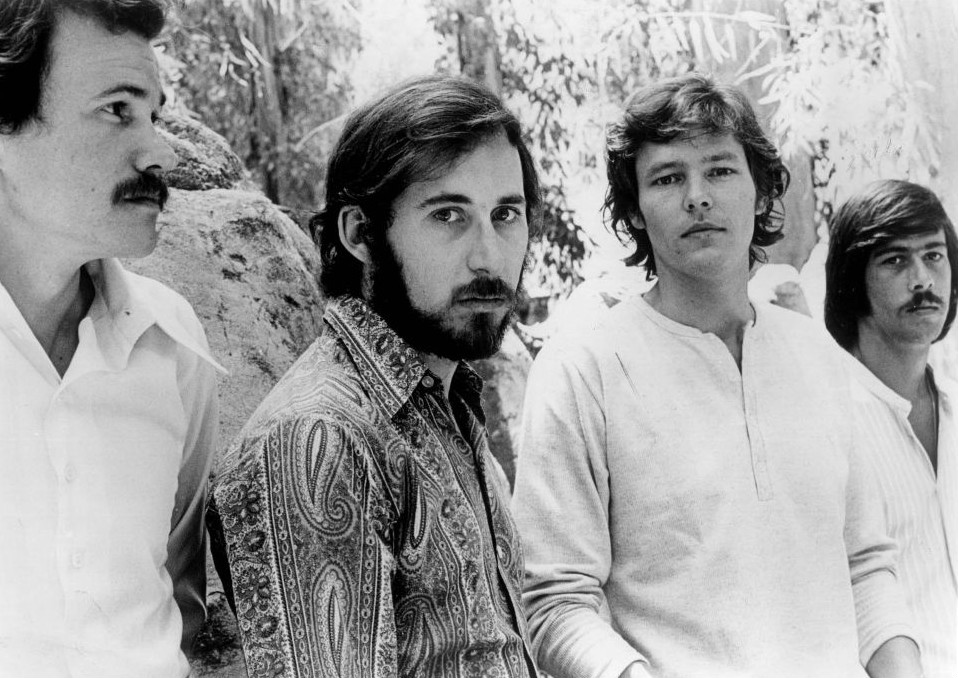
Bread stayed at number one for four weeks at number one with "Lost Without Your Love" and one week with "Hooked on You".

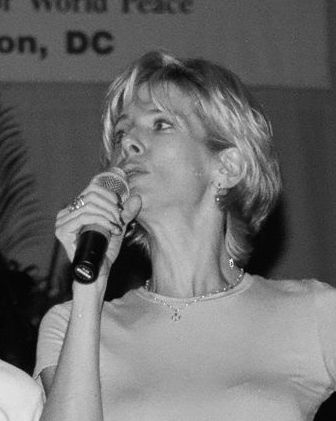
Debby Boone spent two weeks at number one with "You Light Up My Life".

Chart history
Issue date	Title	Artist(s)	Ref.
January 1 (Note: Due to a week's break in publication over the 1976/1977 New Year period, the week of January 1 is inferred.)	"Sorry Seems to Be the Hardest Word"	Elton John	
January 8	"Torn Between Two Lovers"	Mary MacGregor	
January 15	"Weekend in New England"	Barry Manilow	
January 22	"You Don't Have to Be a Star (To Be in My Show)"	Marilyn McCoo and Billy Davis Jr.	
January 29	"Lost Without Your Love"	Bread	
February 5	"Evergreen (Love Theme from A Star Is Born)"	Barbra Streisand	
February 12	"Evergreen (Love Theme from A Star Is Born)"	Barbra Streisand	
February 19	"Evergreen (Love Theme from A Star Is Born)"	Barbra Streisand	
February 26	"Lost Without Your Love"	Bread	
March 5	"You've Got Me Runnin'"	Gene Cotton	
March 12	"I Like Dreamin'"	Kenny Nolan	
March 19	"Sam"	Olivia Newton-John	
March 26	"Say You'll Stay Until Tomorrow"	Tom Jones	
April 2	"Southern Nights"	Glen Campbell	
April 9	"Don't Give Up on Us"	David Soul	
April 16	"I Just Can't Say No to You"	Parker McGee	
April 23	"Right Time of the Night"	Jennifer Warnes	
April 30	"Don't Give Up on Us"	David Soul	
May 7	"Don't Give Up on Us"	David Soul	
May 14	"Hello Stranger"	Yvonne Elliman	
May 21	"Hooked on You"	Bread	
May 28	"Hooked on You"	Bread	
June 4	"Sir Duke"	Stevie Wonder	
June 11	"Hello Hello"	Enrico Farino	
June 18	"Lucille"	Kenny Rogers	
June 25	"Love's Grown Deep"	Kenny Nolan	
July 2	"Margaritaville"	Jimmy Buffett	
July 9	"My Heart Belongs to Me"	Barbra Streisand	
July 16	"My Heart Belongs to Me"	Barbra Streisand	
July 23	"My Heart Belongs to Me"	Barbra Streisand	
July 30	"It's Sad to Belong"	England Dan & John Ford Coley	
August 6	"It's Sad to Belong"	England Dan & John Ford Coley	
August 13	"Looks Like We Made It"	Barry Manilow	
August 20	"Looks Like We Made It"	Barry Manilow	
August 27	"I Just Want to Be Your Everything"	Andy Gibb	
September 3	"Que Sera, Sera"	The Raes	
September 10	"Don't Worry Baby"	B. J. Thomas	
September 17	"Don't It Make My Brown Eyes Blue"	Crystal Gayle	
September 24	"Handy Man"	James Taylor	
October 1	"Handy Man"	James Taylor	
October 8	"Daytime Friends"	Kenny Rogers	
October 15	"Nobody Does It Better"	Carly Simon	
October 22	"On and On"	Stephen Bishop	
October 29	"Star Wars Theme/Cantina Band"	Meco	
November 5	"Just Remember I Love You"	Firefall	
November 12	"You Light Up My Life"	Debby Boone	
November 19	"You Light Up My Life"	Debby Boone	
November 26	"We're All Alone"	Rita Coolidge	
December 3	"Send In the Clowns"	Judy Collins	
December 10	"Send In the Clowns"	Judy Collins	
December 17	"Here You Come Again"	Dolly Parton	
December 24	"Here You Come Again"	Dolly Parton	
December 31	"Sweet Music Man"	Kenny Rogers	
