= List of number-one singles of 1977 (Canada) =

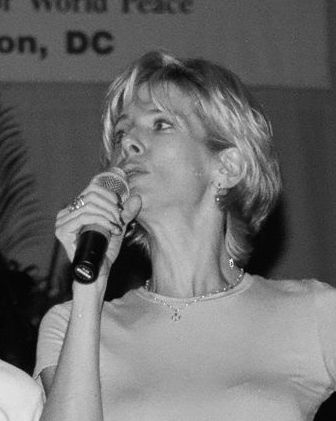
Debby Boone has the best-performing single in Canada in 1977 with "You Light Up My Life".

RPM was a Canadian music magazine that published the best-performing singles chart in Canada from 1964 to 2000. In 1977, thirty-seven singles reached number one in Canada. The first number one single was from Rod Stewart, with "Tonight's the Night (Gonna Be Alright)" which reached number one in December 1976, and the last was "How Deep Is Your Love" from the British-Australian trio Bee Gees. Eighteen acts had their first number-one hit in 1977: Marilyn McCoo and Billy Davis Jr. (both formerly of the 5th Dimension), Leo Sayer, Rose Royce, Manfred Mann's Earth Band, Mary MacGregor, David Soul, Fleetwood Mac, Bob Seger, Alan O'Day, Shaun Cassidy, Andy Gibb, Pablo Cruise, Rita Coolidge, the Electric Light Orchestra, Meco, Debby Boone and Crystal Gayle. Six acts, Leo Sayer, Stevie Wonder, the Eagles, Fleetwood Mac, Shaun Cassidy and KC and the Sunshine Band scored two number-ones each in 1977. No Canadian acts had any number-one song in the chart that year.

The longest-running number-one single of 1977, and also the best-performing single of the year, was Debby Boone's "You Light Up My Life", which spent five weeks at number one. Barbra Streisand's "Evergreen (Love Theme from A Star Is Born)" and Andy Gibb's "I Just Want to Be Your Everything" stayed at number one for three weeks each that year.

== Chart history ==
Key
The yellow background indicates the #1 song on RPM's Year-End Top 200 Singles of 1977.

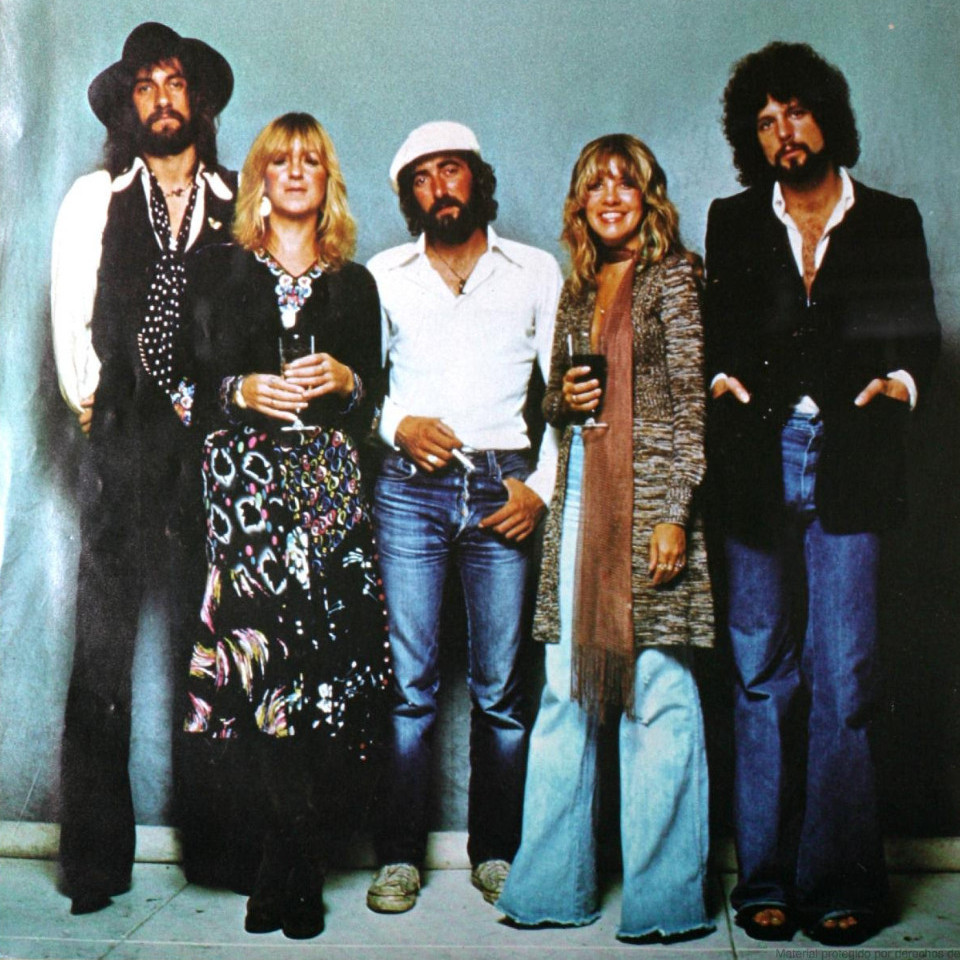
Fleetwood Mac had two number-one hits in Canada in 1977 with "Dreams" and "Don't Stop", both from the bestselling album Rumours.

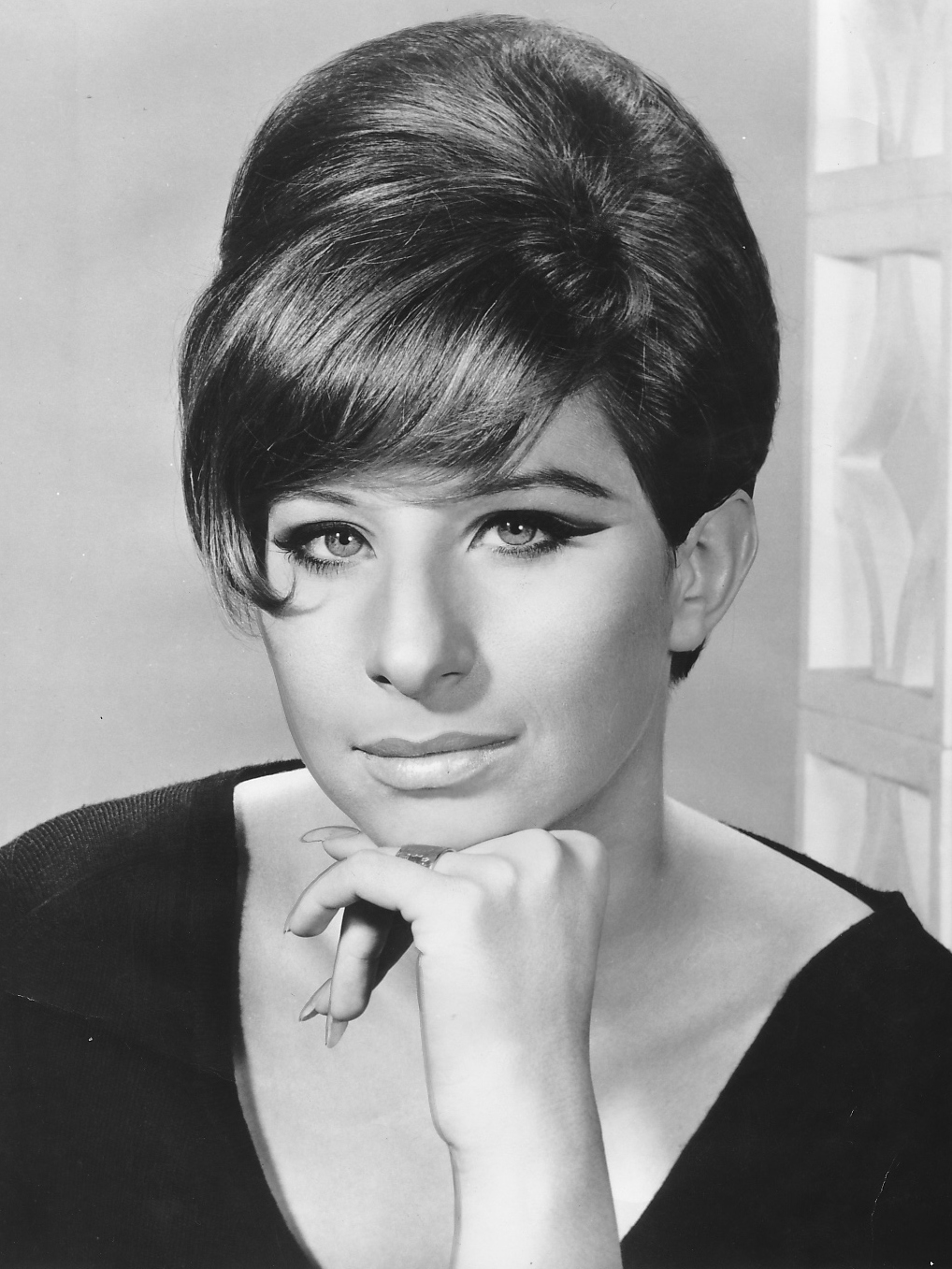
Barbra Streisand spent three weeks at number one with "Evergreen (Love Theme from A Star Is Born)".

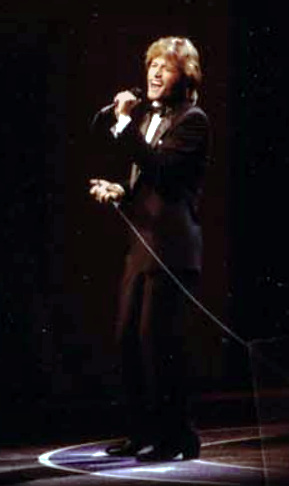
Andy Gibb charted his first number-one in Canada with "I Just Want to Be Your Everything".

Chart history
Issue date	Title	Artist(s)	Ref.
January 1 (Note: Due to a week's break in publication over the 1976/1977 New Year period, the week of January 1 is inferred.)	"Tonight's the Night (Gonna Be Alright)"	Rod Stewart	
January 8	"Muskrat Love"	Captain & Tennille	
January 15	"You Don't Have to Be a Star"	Marilyn McCoo and Billy Davis Jr.	
January 22	"You Make Me Feel Like Dancing"	Leo Sayer	
January 29	"Hot Line"	The Sylvers	
February 5	"I Wish"	Stevie Wonder	
February 12	"Car Wash"	Rose Royce	
February 19	"Blinded by the Light"	Manfred Mann's Earth Band	
February 26	"Torn Between Two Lovers"	Mary MacGregor	
March 5	"New Kid in Town"	Eagles	
March 12	"Evergreen (Love Theme from A Star Is Born)"	Barbra Streisand	
March 19	"Evergreen (Love Theme from A Star Is Born)"	Barbra Streisand	
March 26	"Evergreen (Love Theme from A Star Is Born)"	Barbra Streisand	
April 2	"Dancing Queen"	ABBA	
April 9	"Dancing Queen"	ABBA	
April 16	"The Things We Do for Love"	10cc	
April 23	"Don't Give Up on Us"	David Soul	
April 30	"Hotel California"	Eagles	
May 7	"Hotel California"	Eagles	
May 14	"Southern Nights"	Glen Campbell	
May 21	"When I Need You"	Leo Sayer	
May 28	"When I Need You"	Leo Sayer	
June 4	"I'm Your Boogie Man"	KC and the Sunshine Band	
June 11	"Sir Duke"	Stevie Wonder	
June 18	"Dreams"	Fleetwood Mac	
June 25	"Lucille"	Kenny Rogers	
July 2	"Mainstreet"	Bob Seger	
July 9	"Undercover Angel"	Alan O'Day	
July 16	"Undercover Angel"	Alan O'Day	
July 23	"Da Doo Ron Ron"	Shaun Cassidy	
July 30	"I'm in You"	Peter Frampton	
August 6	"I Just Want to Be Your Everything"	Andy Gibb	
August 13	"I Just Want to Be Your Everything"	Andy Gibb	
August 20	"I Just Want to Be Your Everything"	Andy Gibb	
August 27	"Whatcha Gonna Do?"	Pablo Cruise	
September 3	"(Your Love Has Lifted Me) Higher and Higher"	Rita Coolidge	
September 10	"Don't Stop"	Fleetwood Mac	
September 17	"Handy Man"	James Taylor	
September 24	"Handy Man"	James Taylor	
October 1	"Telephone Line"	Electric Light Orchestra	
October 8	"Telephone Line"	Electric Light Orchestra	
October 15	"Keep It Comin' Love"	KC and the Sunshine Band	
October 22	"Star Wars Theme/Cantina Band"	Meco	
October 29	"That's Rock 'N' Roll"	Shaun Cassidy	
November 5	"You Light Up My Life"	Debby Boone	
November 12	"You Light Up My Life"	Debby Boone	
November 19	"You Light Up My Life"	Debby Boone	
November 26	"You Light Up My Life"	Debby Boone	
December 3	"You Light Up My Life"	Debby Boone	
December 10	"Don't It Make My Brown Eyes Blue"	Crystal Gayle	
December 17	"Don't It Make My Brown Eyes Blue"	Crystal Gayle	
December 24	"How Deep Is Your Love"	Bee Gees	
December 31	"How Deep Is Your Love"	Bee Gees	

== See also ==
- List of RPM number-one adult contemporary singles of 1977
- List of RPM number-one country singles of 1977
- List of Canadian number-one albums of 1977
- List of Billboard Hot 100 number ones of 1977
- List of Cashbox Top 100 number-one singles of 1977
