= List of Cash Box Top 100 number-one singles of 1977 =

These are the number-one singles of 1977 according to the Top 100 Singles Chart in Cash Box magazine

Key
The yellow background indicates the #1 song of 1977.

Issue date	Song	Artist
January 1	"You Don't Have to Be a Star (To Be in My Show)"	Marilyn McCoo & Billy Davis Jr.
January 8	"You Don't Have to Be a Star (To Be in My Show)"	Marilyn McCoo & Billy Davis Jr.
January 15	"Car Wash"	Rose Royce
January 22	"Car Wash"	Rose Royce
January 29	"I Wish"	Stevie Wonder
February 5	"Blinded By The Light"	Manfred Mann's Earth Band
February 12	"Torn Between Two Lovers"	Mary MacGregor
February 19	"Torn Between Two Lovers"	Mary MacGregor
February 26	"Torn Between Two Lovers"	Mary MacGregor
March 5	"Evergreen (Love Theme from A Star Is Born)"	Barbra Streisand
March 12	"Evergreen (Love Theme from A Star Is Born)"	Barbra Streisand
March 19	"Evergreen (Love Theme from A Star Is Born)"	Barbra Streisand
March 26	"Rich Girl"	Daryl Hall & John Oates
April 2	"Dancing Queen"	ABBA
April 9	"Rich Girl"	Daryl Hall & John Oates
April 16	"Don't Give Up on Us"	David Soul
April 23	"Hotel California"	Eagles
April 30	"Southern Nights"	Glen Campbell
May 7	"When I Need You"	Leo Sayer
May 14	"When I Need You"	Leo Sayer
May 21	"When I Need You"	Leo Sayer
May 28	"Sir Duke"	Stevie Wonder
June 4	"I'm Your Boogie Man"	KC & The Sunshine Band
June 11	"Dreams"	Fleetwood Mac
June 18	"Got To Give It Up (pt. 1)"	Marvin Gaye
June 25	"Gonna Fly Now"	Bill Conti
July 2	"Undercover Angel"	Alan O'Day
July 9	"Da Doo Ron Ron"	Shaun Cassidy
July 16	"Da Doo Ron Ron"	Shaun Cassidy
July 23	"I'm in You"	Peter Frampton
July 30	"I Just Want To Be Your Everything"	Andy Gibb
August 6	"I Just Want To Be Your Everything"	Andy Gibb
August 13	"I Just Want To Be Your Everything"	Andy Gibb
August 20	"Best Of My Love"	Emotions
August 27	"Best Of My Love"	Emotions
September 3	"Best Of My Love"	Emotions
September 10	"(Your Love Has Lifted Me) Higher and Higher"	Rita Coolidge
September 17	"Don't Stop"	Fleetwood Mac
September 24	"Star Wars Theme/Cantina Band"	Meco
October 1	"Star Wars Theme/Cantina Band"	Meco
October 8	"You Light Up My Life"	Debby Boone
October 15	"You Light Up My Life"	Debby Boone
October 22	"You Light Up My Life"	Debby Boone
October 29	"You Light Up My Life"	Debby Boone
November 5	"You Light Up My Life"	Debby Boone
November 12	"You Light Up My Life"	Debby Boone
November 19	"You Light Up My Life"	Debby Boone
November 26	"You Light Up My Life"	Debby Boone
December 3	"Don't It Make My Brown Eyes Blue"	Crystal Gayle
December 10	"Don't It Make My Brown Eyes Blue"	Crystal Gayle
December 17	"How Deep Is Your Love"	Bee Gees
December 24	"How Deep Is Your Love"	Bee Gees
December 31	"How Deep Is Your Love"	Bee Gees

== See also ==
- 1977 in music
- Hot 100 number-one hits of 1977 (United States) by Billboard magazine
- RPM number-one hits of 1977 for the #1 hits in Canada
