= List of Billboard Hot 100 number ones of 1977 =

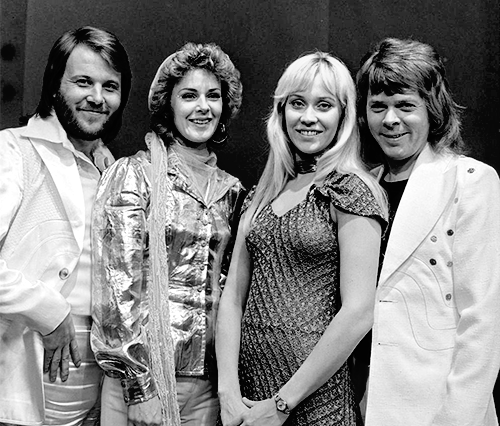
ABBA reached number one with "Dancing Queen" in 1977.

The Billboard Hot 100 is a chart published since August 1958 by Billboard magazine which ranks the best-performing singles in the United States. In 1977, it was compiled based on a combination of sales and airplay data sourced from surveys of retail outlets and playlists submitted by radio stations, respectively. During the year, 29 different singles spent time at number one.

The first issue of Billboard with a 1977 cover date was dated January 8, as the magazine published a special double issue dated December 25, 1976, and did not release an issue the following week. For the first time in the Hot 100's history, the chart was not updated that week, and every entry on the Hot 100 was "frozen" in position from the previous week. This included the number one for the final week of 1976, Rod Stewart's "Tonight's the Night (Gonna Be Alright)", which received an eighth week at number one as a result of the frozen chart. In the issue dated January 8, it was displaced by "You Don't Have to Be a Star (To Be in My Show)" by Marilyn McCoo and Billy Davis Jr.; the husband-and-wife singers had achieved two number ones in the 1960s as part of the 5th Dimension but it was their first chart-topper as a duo. Leo Sayer, Rose Royce, Mary MacGregor, and Manfred Mann's Earth Band all also topped the Hot 100 for the first time in January and February. Sayer returned to the top spot in May with "When I Need You" and was one of only three acts with two number ones in 1977, along with Stevie Wonder and the Eagles. "Blinded by the Light", a chart-topper for Manfred Mann's Earth Band, was a cover version of a song written and originally recorded by Bruce Springsteen; although he is one of the most successful recording artists of all time, none of Springsteen's own singles have topped the Hot 100. Between March and June, Daryl Hall & John Oates, ABBA, David Soul, Thelma Houston, and Fleetwood Mac all reached number one for the first time. ABBA is also one of the most commercially successful acts of all time worldwide, but the single week which the Swedish group spent atop the chart with "Dancing Queen" was its only appearance at number one in the United States.

In October, Debby Boone gained her first number one with "You Light Up My Life". The single occupied the top spot for ten consecutive weeks, setting new records for both the longest unbroken run and the highest total number of weeks spent by a single atop the Hot 100; previously singles by Bobby Darin, Percy Faith, and the Beatles had spent nine weeks in the top spot, either consecutively or non-consecutively. "You Light Up My Life" appeared in the film of the same name, released earlier the same year, in which it was performed by Kasey Cisyk; Joseph Brooks, who produced and scored the film, was dissatisfied with her performance and brought Boone in to record a version for release as a single. Cisyk's version was subsequently also released but only reached number 80. Boone's single was one of several number ones of 1977 which were either taken directly from films or were re-recordings of themes from recent films. Rose Royce's "Car Wash" appeared in the film of the same name and Barbra Streisand reached number one with "Evergreen (Love Theme from A Star Is Born)", from the film A Star is Born, in which she had a leading role. Bill Conti gained his first and only number one in July with "Gonna Fly Now (Theme From Rocky)", taken from the film Rocky, and Meco did the same in October with a disco-style recording of themes from Star Wars. The year's final chart-topper was "How Deep Is Your Love" by the Bee Gees, which was featured in the disco-themed film Saturday Night Fever. Andy Gibb, the younger brother of the Bee Gees, gained his first number one in the second half of the year, as did Alan O'Day, Shaun Cassidy, and the Emotions.

== Chart history ==
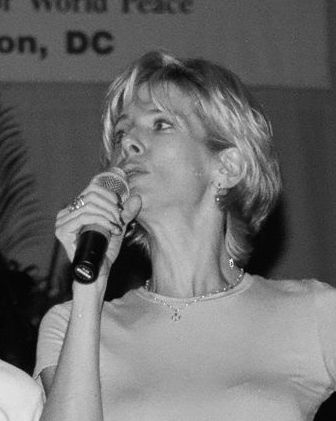
Debby Boone (pictured in 1997) spent a record ten consecutive weeks at number one with "You Light Up My Life".

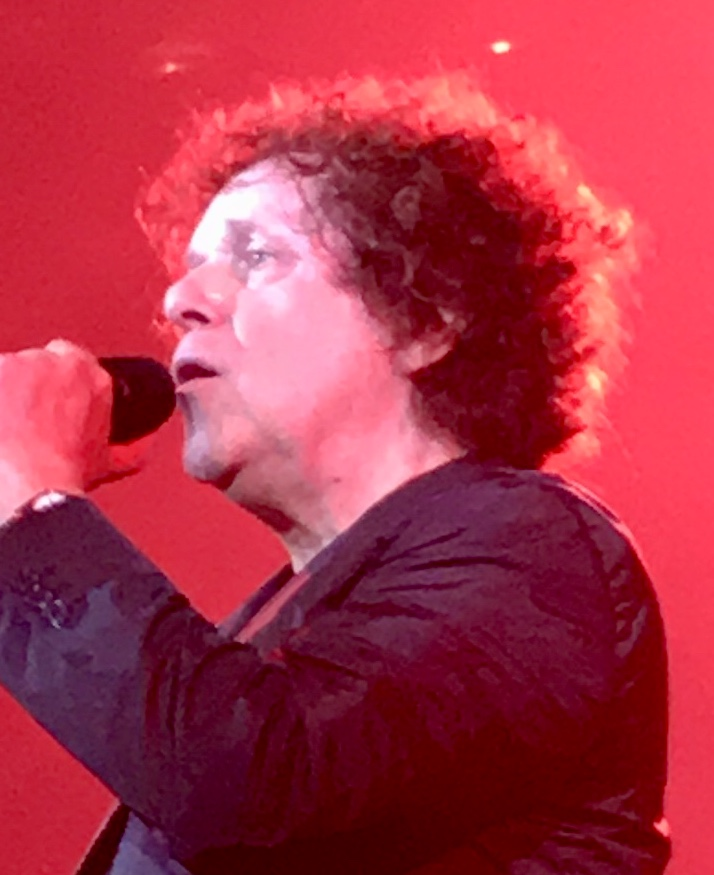
Leo Sayer (pictured in 2019) had two number ones in 1977.

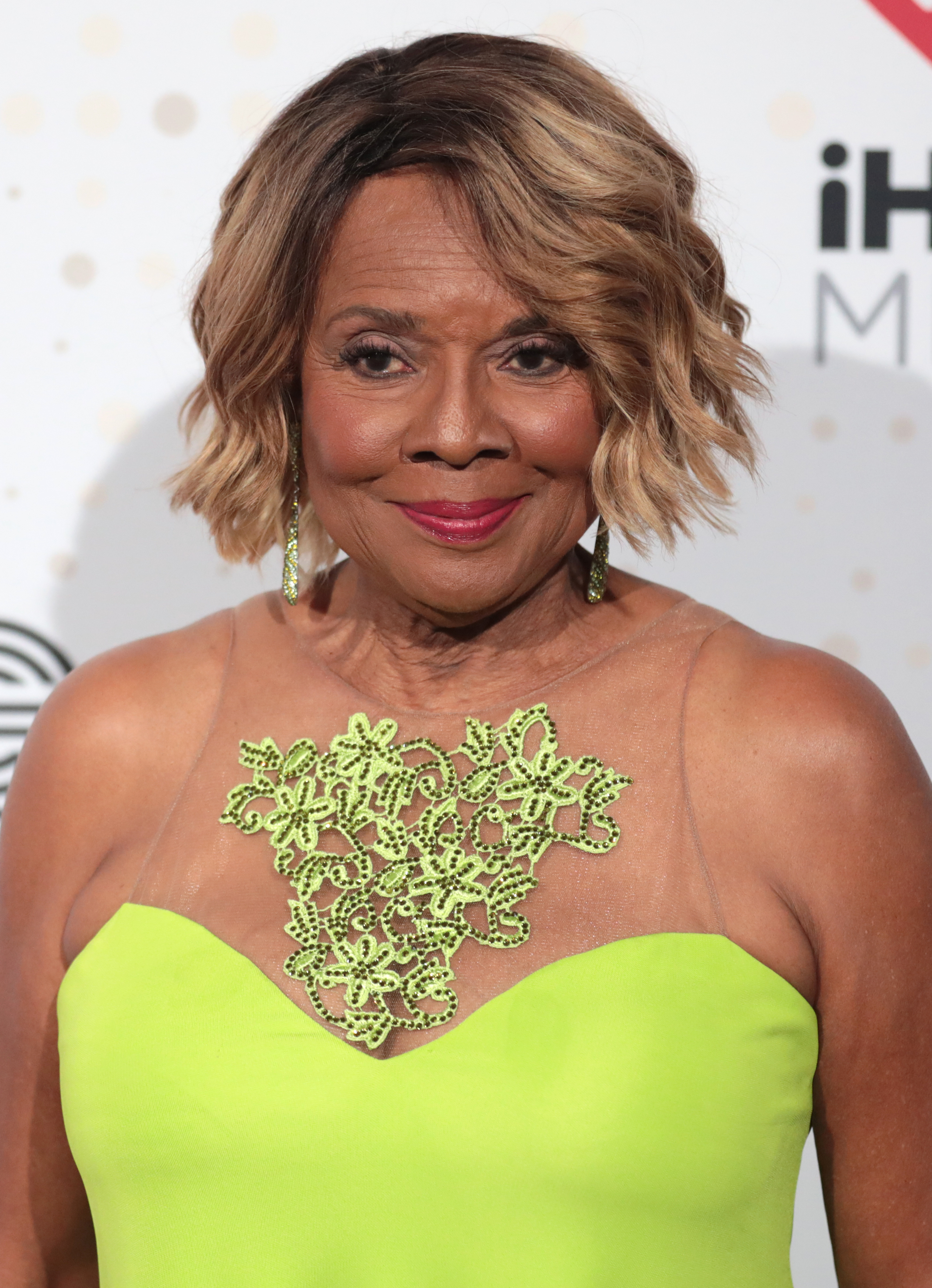
"Don't Leave Me This Way" was the first number one for Thelma Houston (pictured in 2023).

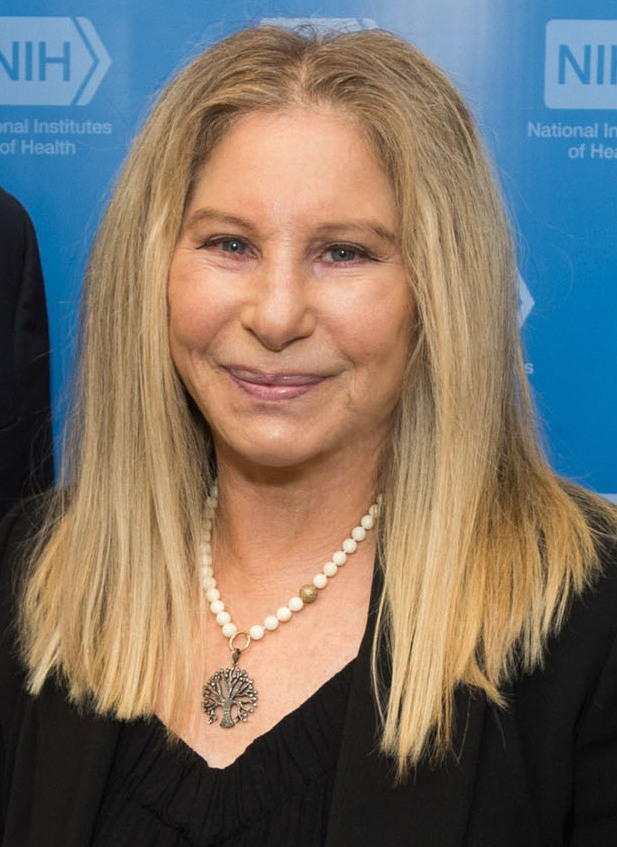
Barbra Streisand (pictured in 2018) topped the Hot 100 with the theme song from a film in which she starred.

Chart history
No. (Note: The "No." column indicates the numerical sequence of number ones in Hot 100 history. "Re" indicates a single returning to number one.)	Issue date	Title	Artist(s)	Ref.
409	January 1 (Note: This was an unpublished week, due to a special double issue that Billboard published in print the previous week. All positions on the Hot 100 were "frozen" during the break.)	"Tonight's the Night (Gonna Be Alright)"	Rod Stewart	
410	January 8	"You Don't Have to Be a Star (To Be in My Show)"	Marilyn McCoo and Billy Davis Jr.	
411	January 15	"You Make Me Feel Like Dancing"	Leo Sayer	
412	January 22	"I Wish"	Stevie Wonder	
413	January 29	"Car Wash"	Rose Royce	
414	February 5	"Torn Between Two Lovers"	Mary MacGregor	
414	February 12	"Torn Between Two Lovers"	Mary MacGregor	
415	February 19	"Blinded by the Light"	Manfred Mann's Earth Band	
416	February 26	"New Kid in Town"	Eagles	
417	March 5	"Evergreen (Love Theme from A Star Is Born)"	Barbra Streisand	
417	March 12	"Evergreen (Love Theme from A Star Is Born)"	Barbra Streisand	
417	March 19	"Evergreen (Love Theme from A Star Is Born)"	Barbra Streisand	
418	March 26	"Rich Girl"	Daryl Hall & John Oates	
418	April 2	"Rich Girl"	Daryl Hall & John Oates	
419	April 9	"Dancing Queen"	ABBA	
420	April 16	"Don't Give Up on Us"	David Soul	
421	April 23	"Don't Leave Me This Way"	Thelma Houston	
422	April 30	"Southern Nights"	Glen Campbell	
423	May 7	"Hotel California"	Eagles	
424	May 14	"When I Need You"	Leo Sayer	
425	May 21	"Sir Duke"	Stevie Wonder	
425	May 28	"Sir Duke"	Stevie Wonder	
425	June 4	"Sir Duke"	Stevie Wonder	
426	June 11	"I'm Your Boogie Man"	KC and the Sunshine Band	
427	June 18	"Dreams"	Fleetwood Mac	
428	June 25	"Got to Give It Up"	Marvin Gaye	
429	July 2	"Gonna Fly Now (Theme From Rocky)"	Bill Conti	
430	July 9	"Undercover Angel"	Alan O'Day	
431	July 16	"Da Doo Ron Ron"	Shaun Cassidy	
432	July 23	"Looks Like We Made It"	Barry Manilow	
433	July 30	"I Just Want to Be Your Everything"	Andy Gibb	
433	August 6	"I Just Want to Be Your Everything"	Andy Gibb	
433	August 13	"I Just Want to Be Your Everything"	Andy Gibb	
434	August 20	"Best of My Love"	The Emotions	
434	August 27	"Best of My Love"	The Emotions	
434	September 3	"Best of My Love"	The Emotions	
434	September 10	"Best of My Love"	The Emotions	
433 (re)	September 17	"I Just Want to Be Your Everything"	Andy Gibb	
434 (re)	September 24	"Best of My Love"	The Emotions	
435	October 1	"Star Wars Theme/Cantina Band"	Meco	
435	October 8	"Star Wars Theme/Cantina Band"	Meco	
436	October 15	"You Light Up My Life"	Debby Boone	
436	October 22	"You Light Up My Life"	Debby Boone	
436	October 29	"You Light Up My Life"	Debby Boone	
436	November 5	"You Light Up My Life"	Debby Boone	
436	November 12	"You Light Up My Life"	Debby Boone	
436	November 19	"You Light Up My Life"	Debby Boone	
436	November 26	"You Light Up My Life"	Debby Boone	
436	December 3	"You Light Up My Life"	Debby Boone	
436	December 10	"You Light Up My Life"	Debby Boone	
436	December 17	"You Light Up My Life"	Debby Boone	
437	December 24	"How Deep Is Your Love"	Bee Gees	
437	December 31	"How Deep Is Your Love"	Bee Gees	

== Number-one artists ==
List of number-one artists by total weeks at number one
Weeks at No. 1	Artist
10	Debby Boone
5	The Emotions
4	Stevie Wonder
4	Andy Gibb
3	Barbra Streisand
2	Mary MacGregor
2	Daryl Hall & John Oates
2	Eagles
2	Leo Sayer
2	Meco
2	Bee Gees
1	Rod Stewart
1	Marilyn McCoo
1	Billy Davis Jr.
1	Rose Royce
1	Manfred Mann's Earth Band
1	ABBA
1	David Soul
1	Thelma Houston
1	Glen Campbell
1	KC and the Sunshine Band
1	Fleetwood Mac
1	Marvin Gaye
1	Bill Conti
1	Alan O'Day
1	Shaun Cassidy
1	Barry Manilow

== See also ==
- 1977 in music
- List of Cash Box Top 100 number-one singles of 1977
- List of Billboard Hot 100 number-one singles of the 1970s
