= Torn Between Two Lovers =

Torn Between Two Lovers may refer to:

- "Torn Between Two Lovers" (song), a 1976 single by Mary MacGregor
- Torn Between Two Lovers (album), a 1976 album by Mary MacGregor
- Torn Between Two Lovers (film), a 1979 American TV film
- "Torn Between Two Lovers" (8 Simple Rules), an episode of the TV series 8 Simple Rules
- "Torn Between Two Lovers", an episode of the TV series ALF
