= List of Canadian number-one albums of 1977 =

This article lists the Canadian number-one albums of 1977. The chart was compiled and published by RPM every Saturday.

Peter Frampton's I'm in You entered the chart at #1. Two acts held the top position in the albums and singles charts simultaneously: Barbra Streisand on March 19 – 26 and Fleetwood Mac on September 10.

(Entries with dates marked thus* are not presently on record at Library and Archives Canada and were inferred from the following week's listing. The first page of the chart displayed for July 30 is erroneously the Country Albums chart; the entry for this date was inferred from the following week's issue. The entries for January 15 and 26 appear with the incorrect date January 15, 1976 at the top of the page; the column showing number of weeks for listings reveals them however to be accurate.)

Issue date	Album	Artist
January 1	Songs in the Key of Life	Stevie Wonder
January 8	Songs in the Key of Life	Stevie Wonder
January 15	Songs in the Key of Life	Stevie Wonder
January 22	Frampton Comes Alive!	Peter Frampton
January 29	Frampton Comes Alive!	Peter Frampton
February 5	Frampton Comes Alive!	Peter Frampton
February 12	Songs in the Key of Life	Stevie Wonder
February 19	Wings over America	Wings
February 26	Frampton Comes Alive!	Peter Frampton
March 5	A New World Record	Electric Light Orchestra
March 12	Car Wash	Original Motion Picture Soundtrack
March 19	A Star Is Born	Barbra Streisand & Kris Kristofferson
March 26	A Star Is Born	Barbra Streisand & Kris Kristofferson
April 2	Hotel California	The Eagles
April 9	Rumours	Fleetwood Mac
April 16	Even in the Quietest Moments...	Supertramp
April 23	Even in the Quietest Moments...	Supertramp
April 30	Even in the Quietest Moments...	Supertramp
May 7	Rumours	Fleetwood Mac
May 14	Even in the Quietest Moments...	Supertramp
May 21	Hotel California	The Eagles
May 28	Hotel California	The Eagles
June 4	Hotel California	The Eagles
June 11	Endless Flight	Leo Sayer
June 18	Endless Flight	Leo Sayer
June 25	I'm in You	Peter Frampton
July 2	Rumours	Fleetwood Mac
July 9	Rumours	Fleetwood Mac
July 16	Book of Dreams	Steve Miller Band
July 23	Book of Dreams	Steve Miller Band
July 30*	Book of Dreams	Steve Miller Band
August 6	Rumours	Fleetwood Mac
August 13	Rumours	Fleetwood Mac
August 20	Rumours	Fleetwood Mac
August 27	Superman	Barbra Streisand
September 3	Superman	Barbra Streisand
September 10	Rumours	Fleetwood Mac
September 17	Rumours	Fleetwood Mac
September 24	Rumours	Fleetwood Mac
October 1	Rumours	Fleetwood Mac
October 8	Rumours	Fleetwood Mac
October 15	Rumours	Fleetwood Mac
October 22	Rumours	Fleetwood Mac
October 29	Rumours	Fleetwood Mac
November 5	Rumours	Fleetwood Mac
November 12	Rumours	Fleetwood Mac
November 19	Rumours	Fleetwood Mac
November 26	Rumours	Fleetwood Mac
December 3	Rumours	Fleetwood Mac
December 10	Simple Dreams	Linda Ronstadt
December 17	Simple Dreams	Linda Ronstadt
December 24	Simple Dreams	Linda Ronstadt
December 31	You Light Up My Life	Debby Boone

== See also ==
- 1977 in music
- RPM number-one hits of 1977
