= Hooked on You =

Hooked on You may refer to:

== Film ==
- Hooked on You (film), a 2007 Hong Kong comedy-drama film

== Music ==
- "Hooked on You" (song), a 1977 song by Bread
- "Hooked on You", a song by Devin Fox, 2011
- "Hooked on You", a song by Dream Street from their self titled album
- "Hooked on You", a song by Infinity, 2007
- "Hooked on You", an unreleased song by Jennifer Lopez, intended for the album Love?, 2011
- "Hooked on You", a song by Karyn White from the album Ritual of Love, 1991
- "Hooked on You", a song by Rhett Fisher, 2017
- "Hooked on You", a song by Silk from the album Silk, 1995
- "Hooked on You", a song by Sweet Sensation from the album Take It While It's Hot, 1988
- "Hooked on You", a song by Sydney Youngblood from the album Passion, Grace and Serious Bass..., 1991

== Video games ==
- Hooked on You: A Dead by Daylight Dating Sim, a 2022 video game
