= ...In Your Eyes =

Studio album by Mary MacGregor
- Released: 1978
- Genre: Pop, country
- Label: Ariola America; SW-50025
- Producer: Tom Catalano

Mary MacGregor chronology
Torn Between Two Lovers (1976)	...In Your Eyes (1978)	Mary MacGregor's Greatest Hits (1979)

...In Your Eyes is Mary MacGregor's second album.

== Track listing ==
Side one

1. "Memories" (David Bluefield, Marty Rodgers) arranged by Al Capps
2. "Alone Too Long" (Mark James, Cynthia Weil) arranged and conducted by Artie Butler
3. "If You Ever Believed" (Andrew Goldmark, Elizabeth Dasheff) arranged and conducted by Lee Holdridge
4. "Satisfied" (Alan O'Day) arranged and conducted by Al Capps
5. "In Your Eyes" (Amy Johnson) arranged by Mary MacGregor's Band

Side two

6. "Hold Tight" (David Gates) arranged and conducted by Al Capps
7. "Just the Way You Are" (Billy Joel) arranged and conducted by Artie Butler
8. "Don't Let Me Be Lonely Tonight" (James Taylor) arranged and conducted by Al Capps
9. "Seashells on the Windows, Candles and a Magic Stone" (Steve Dorff, Joe Henry) arranged and conducted by Lee Holdridge
10. "I've Never Been to Me" (Ron Miller, Ken Hirsch) arranged and conducted by Al Capps

== Personnel ==
- Fred Tackett, Jay Graydon, Ben Benay, Thom Rotella, Lee Ritenour, Doug MacLeod - guitar
- Tabatt Laven - banjo
- Mike Porcaro, Leland Sklar, Bobby Bartone, Reinie Press - bass
- John J. Barnes, Jr., Artie Butler, Michael Lang, David Foster, Harold T.J. Smith - keyboards
- Jim Gordon, Ed Greene, Jeff Porcaro, Wilbert Dugas - drums
- Victor Feldman, Alan Estes, Joe Griglia - percussion
- Stephanie Spruill, Alexandra Brown, Ann White - backing vocals
- Bud Shank - saxophone on "Just the Way You Are"
- Bill Peterson, Buddy Childers, Dick Hyde, Ernie Carlson, Ernie Watts, Gale Robinson, Gene Cipriano, Jerry Hey, Jim Atkinson, John Ellis, Dick Noel, Robert Yeager, Sheridon Stokes, Steve Madaio - horns
- Allan Harshman, Armand Kaproff, Arni Egilsson, Arnold Belnick, Bernard Kundell, Daniel Shindaryov, David Montagu, David Schwartz, Debbie Grossman, Dennis Karmazyn, Harold J. Dicterow, Harris Goldman, Harry Shlutz, Henry Ferber, Henry Roth, Herschel Wise, Ilkka Talvi, Isabelle Daskoff, Israel Baker, Jack Gootkin, James Getzoff, Jay Rosen, Jerome Kessler, Jesse Ehrlich, Joy Lyle, Linn Subotnick, Mark Kovacs, Marvin Limonick, Michael Nowak, Murray Adler, Myra Kestenbaum, Nathan Ross, Pamela Goldsmith, Peter Mercurio, Ray Kelley, Reinhold Press, Richard Kaufman, Ronald Folsom, Samuel Boghossian, Shari Zippert, Sidney Sharp, Tibor Zelig, William Kurasch - strings

Technical

- Armin Steiner - engineer
