= Your Love (Marilyn McCoo and Billy Davis Jr. song) =

Single by Marilyn McCoo and Billy Davis Jr.

from the album I Hope We Get to Love in Time
- B-side: "My Love for You Will Always Be the Same"
- Released: March 1977
- Recorded: 1976
- Genre: Pop, soul
- Length: 3:54 (album version); 3:30 (single edit)
- Label: ABC Records
- Songwriters: H.B. Barnum, W. Johnson
- Producer: Don Davis

Marilyn McCoo and Billy Davis Jr. singles chronology
"You Don't Have to Be a Star (To Be in My Show)" (1976)	"Your Love" (1977)	"Look What You've Done to My Heart" (1977)

"Your Love" is a song by the husband/wife duo of Marilyn McCoo and Billy Davis Jr., former members of the vocal group The 5th Dimension. Released from their album, I Hope We Get to Love in Time, it was the follow-up to their number-one hit, "You Don't Have to Be a Star (To Be in My Show)".

== Chart performance ==
The song reached number 15 on the Billboard Hot 100 during the spring of 1977. It reached number 21 on the US Easy Listening chart. Also, it was a top 10 hit on the US R&B singles chart, where it peaked at number nine.

In Canada, "Your Love" peaked at number 13 on the pop chart and number 17 on the AC chart. Unlike its predecessor, however, the song did not chart outside North America.

=== Weekly charts ===
Chart (1977)	Peak position
Canada RPM Top Singles	13
Canada RPM Adult Contemporary	17
US Billboard Hot 100	15
US Billboard R&B/Soul	9
US Billboard Easy Listening	21
US Cash Box Top 100	16

=== Year-end charts ===
Chart (1977)	Rank
Canada RPM Top Singles	123
