= Torn Between Two Lovers (album) =

Studio album by Mary MacGregor
- Released: December 1976
- Studio: Muscle Shoals Sound Studio, Sheffield, Alabama
- Genre: Pop
- Label: Ariola America
- Producer: Peter Yarrow, Barry Beckett

Mary MacGregor chronology
Torn Between Two Lovers (1976)	...In Your Eyes (1978)

Torn Between Two Lovers is the debut album by Mary MacGregor. It was produced and partly written by Peter Yarrow, and released in December 1976.

== Release and promotion ==
The album was released in December 1976 and reached the number 17 position on the Billboard 200 chart. Three singles were released in promotion of the album, all reaching both the Country singles and Hot 100 pop charts. The title track was a number-one hit on the pop and adult contemporary charts.

== Critical reception ==
Reviewing in Christgau's Record Guide: Rock Albums of the Seventies (1981), Robert Christgau gave the record a "C" and said, "I consider it significant that Peter Yarrow's first commercial success of the decade is an Olivia Newton-John substitute, albeit one who's willing to admit she fucks around." Robert Hilburn of the Los Angeles Times described Macgregor's voice as "an uncanny blend of the wholesomeness of John Denver and the vulnerability of Olivia Newton-John" and called the album "a mostly hapless collection of little-girl-lost vocals" and stated that "when Macgregor is allowed to break away from this tripe, she shows surprising vocal authority and charm. Her next album might be worth checking out. This one isn't."

Conversely, Stereo Review critic Peter Reilly wrote an admiring review of the album, which read, as follows:

The blitzkrieg success of her giant hit, Torn Between Two Lovers, first issued as a single, may keep some of Mary Macgregor's other efforts in shadow for a while, at least until the public cools down about that simple, enormously affecting, and effective ballad. But, as this album shows, Macgregor has genuine talent both as a performer and as a writer-composer. Her voice (as everyone in the world must know by now) is a light, finely spun, expressive instrument that she uses with great skill to achieve small but telling dramatic points. The songs in this album are actually short musings on different aspects of romantic love as experienced by a girl growing into woman hood. Although none of the others have the quiet power of the title song, they all reflect a natural and observant sensibility of a high order. The production by Peter Yarrow (formerly of Peter, Paul, and Mary, and her discoverer) and Barry Beckett is especially fine, allowing Macgregor plenty of room to breathe as an artist but not missing a trick in making her sound her best. Highly recommended.

== Track listing ==
Side one

1. "Mama" (Stephen Ferguson) 3:19
2. "This Girl (Has Turned Into a Woman)" (Peter Yarrow, Mary MacGregor) 3:25
3. "Good Together" (Gretta Larson) 2:52
4. "It's Too Soon (To Let Our Love End)" (Jim Salestrom) 2:46
5. "Why Did You Wait (To Tell Me)" (Peter Yarrow) 4:05

Side two

1. "The Lady I Am" (Gretta Larson) 3:45
2. "For a While" (Peter Yarrow, Kevin Hunter) 2:52
3. "I Just Want to Love You" (Randy Sharp) 3:00
4. "Take Your Love Away" (Randy Sharp) 2:49
5. "Torn Between Two Lovers" (Peter Yarrow, Phillip Jarrell) 3:49

== Personnel ==
- Tim Henson - keyboards
- David Hood - bass guitar
- Roger Hawkins - drums
- Tom Roady - percussion
- Pete Carr - lead guitar, acoustic guitar
- Jimmy Johnson - rhythm guitar
- Ken Bell - acoustic guitar
- Larry Byrom - acoustic guitar on "Good Together"
- Stu Basore - pedal steel guitar
- Barry Beckett - keyboards, synthesizer
- David Campbell - string arrangements and conducting
- Muscle Shoals Horns (Charles Rose, Harrison Calloway, Harvey Thompson, Ronnie Eades)
- Ginger Holladay, Lisa Silver, Sheri Kramer - background vocals

== Charts ==
Chart (1977)	Peak position
Australia (Kent Music Report)	35
U.S. Billboard 200	17
U.S. Country Albums	3
