= Lost Without Your Love (song) =

Single by Bread

from the album Lost Without Your Love
- B-side: "Change of Heart"
- Released: November 1976
- Genre: Soft rock
- Length: 2:56
- Label: Elektra
- Songwriter: David Gates
- Producer: David Gates

Bread singles chronology
"Aubrey" (1973)	"Lost Without Your Love" (1976)	"Hooked on You" (1977)

"Lost Without Your Love" is a song written and composed by David Gates, and originally recorded by the soft rock group Bread, of which Gates was the leader and primary music producer. It is the title track of Bread's last album which was released in 1976, and the song became their final top 10 hit.

AllMusic critic Donald A. Guarisco described it as "a weepy David Gates ballad that added electronics to [Bread's] lush pop sound." The lyrics are melodramatic, containing lines such as "Since you left I can hardly make it through the day" and "I'm lost without your love/Life without you isn't worth the trouble of." The melody is in a minor key, with slower verses and a more energetic chorus. Unlike most Bread songs, where the guitar is the lead instrument, the lead instrument on "Lost Without Your Love" is the piano.

The single lasted 16 weeks on the U.S. Billboard Hot 100, longer than any of their other songs except their greatest hit, "Make It with You". It became their comeback hit after an absence from the chart of three and a half years, during which time Gates began his solo career.

In the US, "Lost Without Your Love" peaked at number 9, and number 3 on the Easy Listening chart. Outside the US, "Lost Without Your Love" spent two weeks at number 8 in Canada and number 1 on the country's Easy Listening chart.

Classic Rock History critic John Tabacco rated it as Bread's 6th best song, calling it a "lush romantic love song".

== Chart performance ==
=== Weekly charts ===
Chart (1976–1977)	Peak position
Australia (Kent Music Report)	19
Canadian RPM Top Singles	8
Canadian RPM Adult Contemporary	1
New Zealand (RIANZ)	23
UK Singles Chart	27
US Billboard Hot 100	9
US Billboard Easy Listening	3
US Cash Box Top 100	12

=== Year-end charts ===
Chart (1977)	Rank
Canada RPM Top Singles	86
US Billboard Hot 100	70
US Billboard Easy Listening	26
