= Torn Between Two Lovers (film) =

- Genre: Drama; Romance
- Story by: Rita Lakin; Doris Silverton
- Directed by: Delbert Mann
- Starring: Lee Remick; Joseph Bologna; George Peppard
- Theme music composer: Ian Fraser
- Country of origin: United States
- Original language: English

Production
- Executive producer: Tom Kuhn
- Producers: Joan Barnett; Alan Landsburg; Linda Otto
- Production location: Toronto
- Cinematography: Ronald M. Lautore
- Editors: Gene Milford; Lloyd Nelson
- Running time: 97 min.
- Production company: Alan Landsburg Productions

Original release
- Network: CBS
- Release: May 2, 1979

Torn Between Two Lovers is a 1979 American TV movie. It was inspired by the 1976 hit song of the same name, which features on the soundtrack.

== Premise ==
A married housewife, Diane, falls in love with another man, an architect.

== Cast ==
- Lee Remick as Diane
- George Peppard
- Joseph Bologna

== Production ==
It was shot in Toronto in January 1979.

== Reception ==
The New York Times called it "rather ordinary" with "slick production".
