= Undercover Angel (song) =

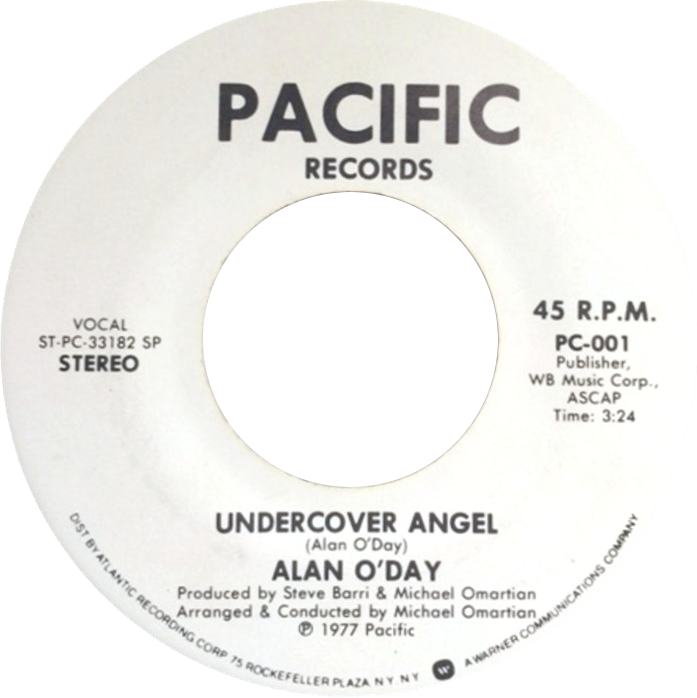
- One of side-A labels of the US single

Single by Alan O'Day

from the album Appetizers
- B-side: "Just You"
- Released: February 1977
- Genre: Pop
- Length: 4:12 (album version); 3:24 (single version)
- Label: Pacific
- Songwriter: Alan O'Day
- Producers: Steve Barri and Michael Omartian

Alan O'Day singles chronology
"Soldier of Fortune" (1977)	"Undercover Angel" (1977)	"Started Out Dancing, Ended Up Making Love" (1977)

"Undercover Angel" is a song by singer-songwriter Alan O'Day. Released as a single in 1977, it was certified gold, having reached #1 on both the Billboard Hot 100 and Cashbox Magazine's Top 100 Singles Chart. It ranked #9 on the Billboard Magazine year-end chart for 1977. On the international front, the song reached #1 on Canada's RPM chart and #9 on the Australian Singles Chart. On the Record World top Singles Chart "Undercover Angel" performed much more strongly than on Billboard's Hot 100, logging four non-consecutive weeks at #1 and spending 10 weeks in the top five (June 18–August 20, 1977).

== Background ==
In 1977, Warner Bros. Music formed a special label, Pacific Records, for their composers who also performed. O'Day was the first artist signed, and his first release was "Undercover Angel". The original vinyl pressing was released with the B-side "Just You".

The song, which O'Day called a "nocturnal novelette", was released without fanfare in February 1977. Within a few months, "Undercover Angel" had reached #1 in the United States, initially without an album to support it (though ultimately it appeared on O'Day's 1977 album Appetizers). O'Day said of the experience, "It's wonderful when you find out what feels right, and then it also feels right to other people. That's a songwriter's dream." O'Day had also composed "Angie Baby", a No. 1 hit for Helen Reddy. The success of these two songs means O'Day is among the few singer-songwriters who wrote chart-toppers for themselves and another artist.

== Storyline ==
The song begins with a man describing his loneliness, when a woman suddenly appears in his bed and encourages him to make love to her. The rest of the song describes his feelings about her, then he discovers she must leave him, and he is saddened. She tells him, "go find the right one, love her, and then when you look into her eyes you'll see me again".

It then becomes apparent that he has been telling this story to a woman he is trying to seduce so he tells her that "underneath the covers, the answer lies. I'm looking for my angel in your sweet loving eyes" (the context of the song's title).

== Charts ==
=== Weekly charts ===
Chart (1977)	Peak position
Australia (KMR)	9
Canada Top Singles (RPM)	1
Canada Adult Contemporary (RPM)	12
New Zealand (RIANZ)	4
UK Singles (OCC)	43
US Billboard Hot 100	1
US Adult Contemporary (Billboard)	31
US Cash Box Top 100	1
US Record World Singles	1

=== Year-end charts ===
Chart (1977)	Rank
Australia (Kent Music Report)	38
Canada (RPM)	4
New Zealand	23
US Billboard Hot 100	9
US Cash Box Top 100	4

== Use in media ==
"Undercover Angel" was used in the 2011 J. J. Abrams film Super 8.

== See also ==
- List of Hot 100 number-one singles of 1977 (U.S.)
- List of RPM number-one singles of 1977
- List of 1970s one-hit wonders in the United States
