= Ariola =

German record label

- Parent company: Bertelsmann (1958–1987); Bertelsmann Music Group (1987–2004); Sony BMG Music Entertainment (2004–2008; 50%); Sony Music Entertainment (2008–present)
- Founded: 12 May 1958; 68 years ago
- Distributors: Sony Music Australia; Sony Music Germany; Legacy Recordings (Ariola America catalog)
- Genre: Various
- Country of origin: Germany
- Location: Berlin, Germany
- Official website: ariola.de

Ariola (also known as Ariola Records, Ariola Express, Ariola-Eurodisc and BMG Ariola) is a German record label. In the late 1980s, it was a subsidiary label of the Bertelsmann Music Group, which in turn has become a part of the international media conglomerate Sony Music Entertainment.

== Profile ==
Ariola Eurodisc GmbH was founded in 1958 as a music outlet of Bertelsmann. It set up several foreign subsidiaries. Leveraging acquisitions by its parent company, Ariola positioned itself to become a strong contender in the German record industry in the mid-1960s. Ariola America was founded in 1975 in Los Angeles, and achieved Billboard magazine number one singles with Mary MacGregor's "Torn Between Two Lovers" (1976) and Amii Stewart's cover version of the 1966 Eddie Floyd hit "Knock on Wood" (1979). Other artists on the Ariola America roster during the late 1970s included Gene Cotton, The Three Degrees, Chanson, and the Canadian band Prism among others. After its pop success dried up, Ariola America found success in the Spanish language market including José José and Rocío Dúrcal from the late 1970s onward and Mexican artist Marisela starting in the 1990s. In 1985, they signed the Monterrey-based group Bronco; their first album with the label was "Sergio El Bailador", which spawned the title track that catapulted them to success. The subsidiaries include Ariola-Athena to release spoken word records; Ariola Benelux was founded in 1970 to cover the Benelux market; Ariola Eurodisc S.A. was a Spanish division of Ariola, founded in 1970; Ariola UK, the UK based subsidiary of Ariola, was founded in 1977; Baccarola; Türküola, a subsidiary for the Turkish market; Eurodisc to release classical records in Europe and Arabella to release disco records in France - most successfully with Amanda Lear, Giorgio Moroder (house producer of Ariola); and Jupiter Records for German Schlager music and disco artists such as Dschinghis Khan.

It acquired both Arista Records and German rival label Hansa Records in 1979. It sold 50% of Arista to RCA Records in 1983; after a brief joint venture between RCA and Ariola, RCA (including its record division) was acquired by General Electric who promptly sold RCA's stake in the venture back to Ariola. Ariola America also had a sister label called Ocean Records, which included on its roster actress/entertainer Ann-Margret. It was active 1979 through 1980. In the 1980s, there was a software development division called Ariolasoft.

Today, Ariola is a unit of Sony Music Group and is still active in Germany under the Sony Group Corporation umbrella.

== See also ==
- Lists of record labels
- Ariola Japan, formerly called BMG Japan until its acquisition from Sony Music Entertainment Japan
