= A Star Is Born (1976 film) =

Musical romantic drama by Frank Pierson

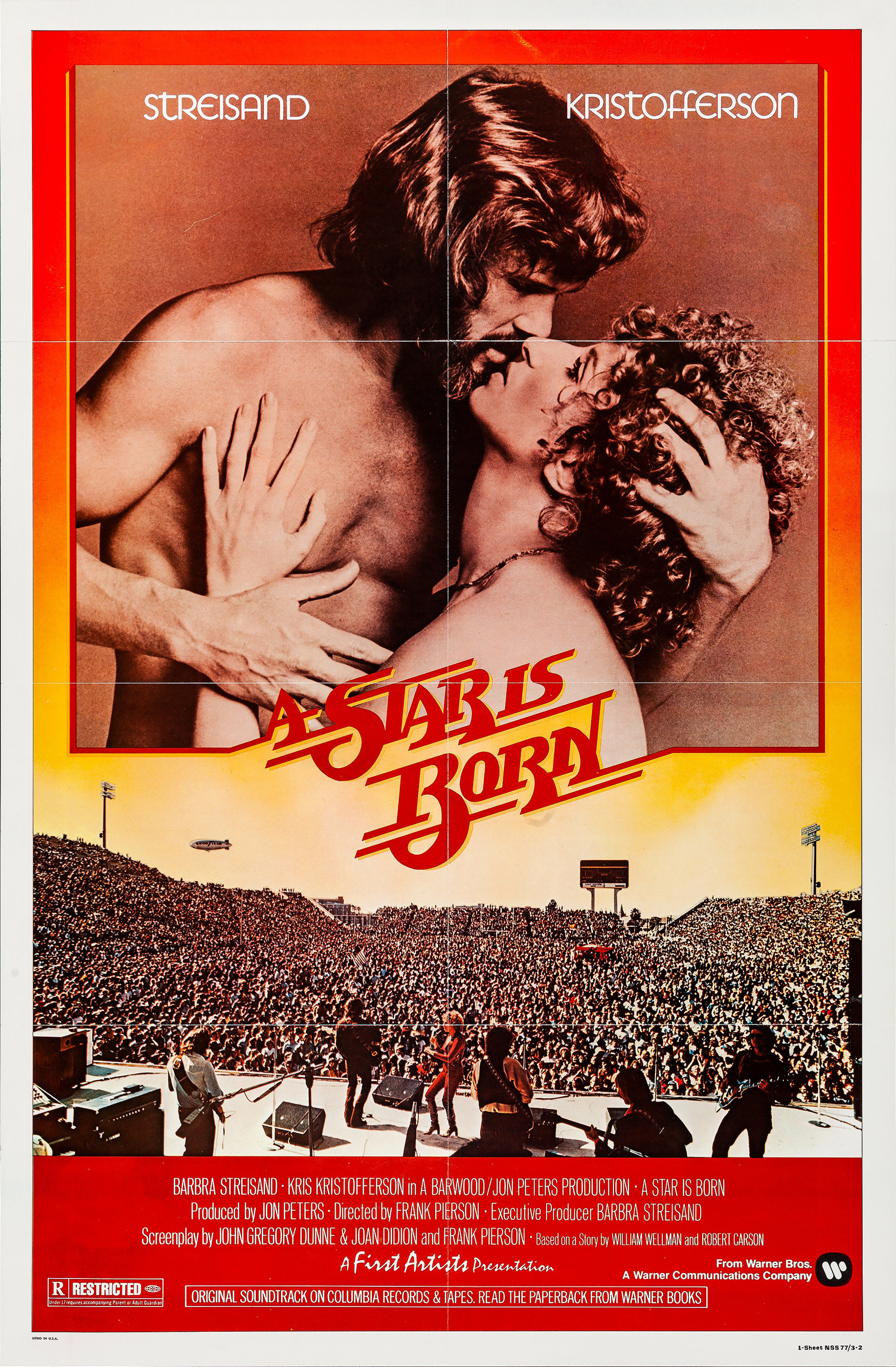
- Theatrical release poster
- Directed by: Frank Pierson
- Screenplay by: Frank Pierson; John Gregory Dunne; Joan Didion
- Based on: A Star Is Born (1937 film) by: William A. Wellman; Robert Carson; Dorothy Parker; Alan Campbell
- Produced by: Jon Peters
- Starring: Barbra Streisand; Kris Kristofferson
- Cinematography: Robert Surtees
- Edited by: Peter Zinner
- Music by: Songs: Barbra Streisand; Kenneth Ascher; Paul Williams; Score: Roger Kellaway
- Production companies: First Artists; Barwood Films
- Distributed by: Warner Bros.
- Release dates: December 18, 1976 (Premiere); December 19, 1976 (L.A.)
- Running time: 142 minutes
- Country: United States
- Language: English
- Budget: $6 million
- Box office: $80 million

A Star Is Born is a 1976 American musical romantic drama film directed by Frank Pierson, written by Pierson, John Gregory Dunne, and Joan Didion. It stars Barbra Streisand as an unknown singer and Kris Kristofferson as an established rock and roll star. The two fall in love, only to find her career ascending while his goes into decline.

The film is a remake of the 1937 film with Janet Gaynor and Fredric March, notably adapted in 1954 as a musical starring Judy Garland and James Mason; and subsequently again in 2018 with Lady Gaga and Bradley Cooper. It features songs written by Streisand, Paul Williams and Kenneth Ascher, with underscore by Roger Kellaway.

A Star Is Born premiered at the Mann Village Theater on December 18, 1976, with a wide release by Warner Bros. the following day. A huge box office success, grossing $80 million on a $6 million budget in North America, it emerged as the second highest-grossing of the year. Reviews praised its performances and musical score, but criticized the screenplay and runtime. At the 49th Academy Awards, the film was nominated in three categories and won Best Original Song for its love theme "Evergreen".

== Plot ==
John Norman Howard, a talented but self-destructive rock star, arrives late and intoxicated to his concert, performs a few songs, and abruptly leaves, much to the disappointment of his fans. His driver subsequently drives him to a bar where struggling singer Esther Hoffman performs as the lead singer of her trio The Oreos. John is approached by an aggressive bar patron who starts a fight after John refuses to perform on demand, and Esther, caught up in the ensuing chaos, helps him escape through a rear exit, and the pair then flee the scene in his limousine.

At Esther's home, she invites him to return for breakfast in the morning. Over the pepperoni pizza John had brought himself, she reluctantly agrees to follow him to one of his concerts, and they both arrive by helicopter. After a brief performance of stage, John rides a fan's motorbike around the stage, snags a cable, and crashes off the stage and into the crowd. He is taken away by ambulance and his entourage flee by helicopter, leaving a furious Esther stranded.

Shortly after the incident, while John is resting beside his swimming pool at home, he fires his gun at intrusive radio DJ Bebe Jesus who vows to blacklist his music. John subsequently visits the radio station carrying a case of Jack Daniel's as a peace offering which Bebe Jesus rejects, publicly denouncing John as an alcoholic. On his way out, John spots Esther recording a jingle with The Oreos, and he takes her to his mansion where he spray paints her name on his wall, and share an evening of intimacy and music.

At his next concert, John invites Esther onto the stage with other two Oreos as backing singers, and she gradually wins over the crowd. Several music executives show interest, but Esther only cares about marrying John. He initially dissuades her, arguing they lack compatibility, but she insists, and the couple marry before moving to his Southwest ranch. Esther proposes that they tour together, but John's manager suggests she embarks on a solo career which rapidly flourishes, eventually surpassing her husband's fame. John attempts to restart his own career but discovers that the band have rebranded without him.

Esther, who has been nominated for a Grammy, wins the award for Best Female Performance. During her acceptance speech, an intoxicated John disrupts the ceremony, although she nevertheless defends him. His attempts to revive his career prove unsuccessful, prompting him to consider becoming a music executive upon realising that he is past his prime. At their LA mansion, Esther returns from touring to find John in bed with Quentin, a journalist assigned to interview her. After Quentin leaves, the couple argue, but ultimately reaffirm their love and return to the ranch in an attempt to recapture their earlier happiness.

John wakes early one morning and tells Esther he is going to collect Brian at the airport. He drunk drives in his convertible, playing his biggest hit, but after losing interest he listens to one of Esther's songs instead. As he moves increasingly fast, he loses control and is instantly killed. Esther runs towards John's dead body in tears and asks herself what she is supposed to do without him. Back at the LA mansion, Esther hears a recording of John's voice early songwriting sessions which a mover is unable to turn off. She cries inside the now empty house, branding John a liar and lamenting that he was never meant to leave her.

At a memorial concert for John, Esther walks onstage, introduced as Esther Hoffman-Howard, and the audience raises candles as a tribute to her late husband. Esther sings the song John wrote for her, "With One More Look at You", and then transitions into his hit "Watch Closely Now", done in her own style. On the last beat of the song, Esther spreads her arms wide and looks up to the heavens.

== Cast ==
- Barbra Streisand as Esther Hoffman Howard
- Kris Kristofferson as John Norman Howard
- Paul Mazursky as Brian Wexler, John's manager
- Gary Busey as Bobbie Ritchie
- Oliver Clark as Gary Danziger, John's PR man
- Venetta Fields as a member of The Oreos
- Clydie King as a member of The Oreos
- Marta Heflin as Quentin, an aspiring music journalist
- M.G. Kelly as Bebe Jesus, a radio DJ
- Sally Kirkland as Photographer
- Joanne Linville as Freddie Lowenstein, John's agent
- Uncle Rudy as Mo, John's driver
- Rita Coolidge as herself
- Tony Orlando as himself
- Susan Richardson as the groupie in the limousine (uncredited)
- Robert Englund as Marty (uncredited)
- Maidie Norman as the justice of the peace (uncredited)
- Martin Erlichman as Manager (uncredited)

== Production ==
Directed by Frank Pierson, the film updates the original story and screenplay of William A. Wellman and Robert Carson with additional contributions by Pierson, John Gregory Dunne, and Joan Didion. Gary Busey and Sally Kirkland appear in the film in supporting roles. Singers Venetta Fields and Clydie King play Esther's backing vocalists, and Tony Orlando and Kristofferson's then-wife Rita Coolidge appear briefly as themselves as the presenters of Esther's Grammy.

The two previous A Star is Born films portrayed the behind-the-scenes world of Hollywood filmmaking. However, this version adapted the story to the music business. For example, while the 1937 and 1954 films each portrayed the lead female character winning an Academy Award, this version (and the later 2018 version) depicts the heroine winning a Grammy Award instead.

A Star Is Born was co-produced by Streisand and her then-partner Jon Peters for Barwood Films and Warner Bros., with Peters credited as producer and Streisand as executive producer. They wanted Elvis Presley for the male lead, and met with Elvis to discuss the film. He was interested in taking the part, thinking it would revive his film career, but his manager, Colonel Tom Parker, insisted Elvis have top billing and asked for a substantial sum of money for the role, even though he had not had an acting role since 1969, and it was unknown what kind of box office draw he would be. This effectively ended Elvis's involvement with the project. Parker also did not want to have Elvis portrayed as having a show business career in decline, because this was far from the truth, with Elvis playing to packed auditoriums wherever he toured in the States. Among the other actors considered for the male lead were Neil Diamond and Marlon Brando. Diamond, who knew Streisand and had attended high school with her at Erasmus Hall High School in Brooklyn, had to decline due to his extensive concert commitments, and Kristofferson got the part of John Norman Howard.

Kristofferson denied modelling his character on Jim Morrison saying: "That's a good idea but it's not true. I don't think I ever met Morrison. A lot of people said we looked alike – shirts off, beards – but that washed-up rock star was more about me."

The film cost around $6 million to produce. Its soundtrack album was an international success, reaching number 1 in many countries and selling nearly 15 million copies worldwide. It featured the ballad "Evergreen (Love Theme from A Star Is Born)", which became one of the biggest hits of Streisand's career, spending three weeks at number one in the United States, and peaking at number three in the United Kingdom.

The filming locations included many in Arizona, such as downtown Tucson, Tucson Community Center, Sonoita, and Tempe, including Sun Devil Stadium. Streisand's wardrobe was selected from her own personal clothing—the film credit reads: "Miss Streisand's clothes from... her closet". The film was choreographed by David Winters, who worked closely with Streisand to perfect the movie's dancing sequences.

== Release ==
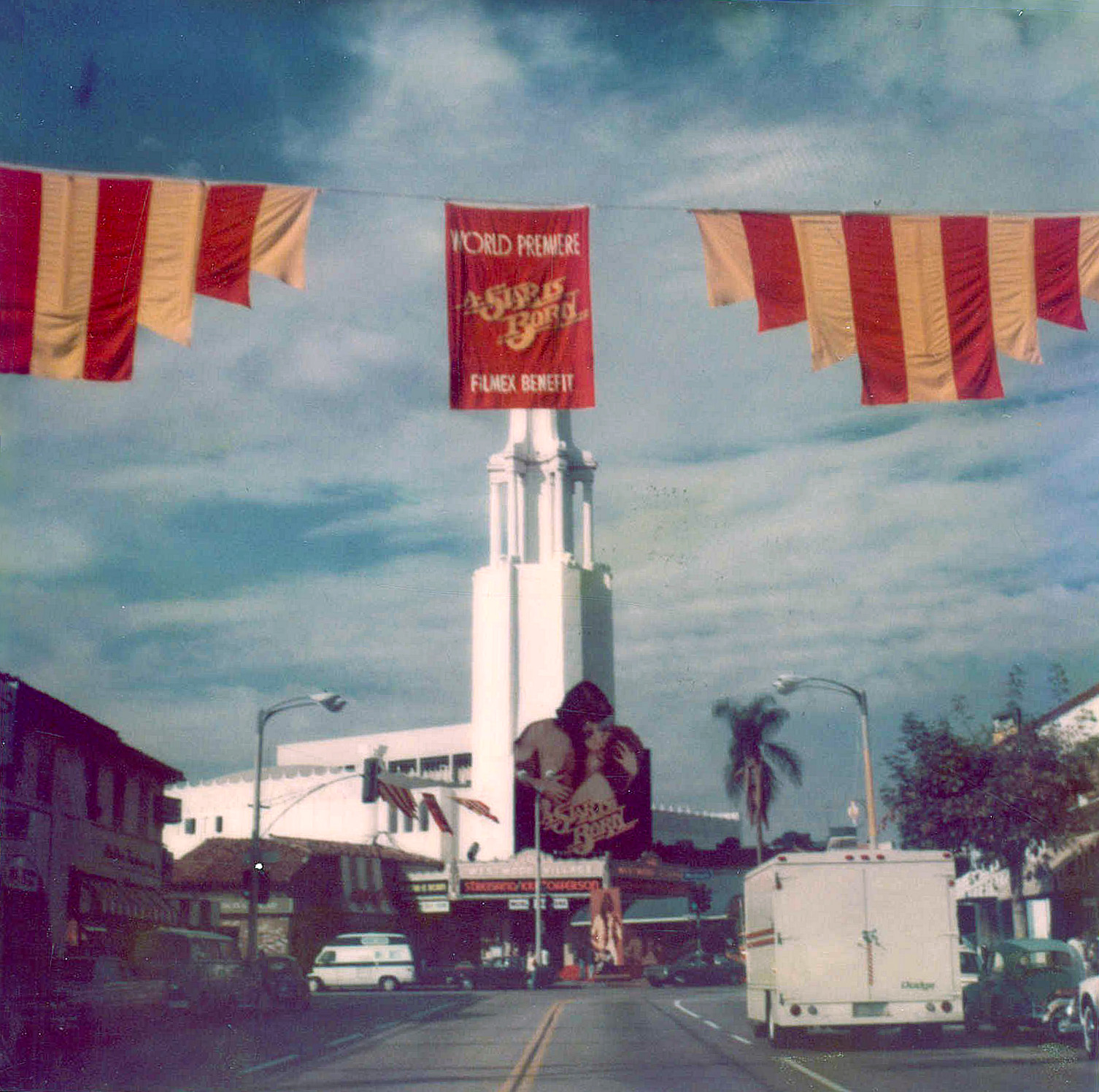
World premiere at Village Theater, Westwood

A Star Is Born was shown as a benefit for Filmex at Mann's Village Theater in Westwood, Los Angeles on December 18, 1976. It opened the following day at the Village Theater and Mann's Chinese Theatre. It opened in New York City and other US cities on December 25, 1976.

== Reception ==
=== Box office ===
A Star Is Born grossed $80 million at the U.S. box office, making it the 2nd highest-grossing film of 1976.

=== Critical reception ===
==== Contemporary reviews ====
A Star Is Born was initially released to mixed-to-negative reviews. Many critics felt that Streisand's fame overshadowed both Kristofferson and their respective performances. Roger Ebert gave the film two and a half stars out of four, writing in his review: "There is, to begin with, no denying Barbra Streisand's enormous talent. At the end of A Star Is Born the camera stays on her for one unbroken shot of seven or eight minutes, and she sings her heart out, and we concede that she's one of the great stars of the movies, one of the elemental presences...I thought Miss Streisand was distractingly miscast in the role, and yet I forgave her everything when she sang."

Gene Siskel also gave the film two and a half stars, calling it "a lumbering love story made palatable by Streisand's superb singing."

Variety was positive, calling Streisand's performance "her finest screen work to date, while Kristofferson's portrayal of her failing benefactor realizes all the promise first shown five years ago in Cisco Pike. Peters' production is outstanding, and Pierson's direction is brilliant."

Vincent Canby of The New York Times called the film "a transistorized remake, louder than ever, but very small in terms of its being about anything whatsoever." He also noted that Kristofferson "walks through the film looking very bored."

Charles Champlin of the Los Angeles Times wrote: "The treatment of Streisand is so ceaselessly close up and reverential from the start that there really seems nowhere to go but further up, and little of the mutuality of need that is essential to a love, or a love story...A half-hour in, I wrote 'a star is boring' in my notes, and was not later persuaded I'd been wrong."

Gary Arnold of The Washington Post suggested that the film "should be retitled 'A Star is Embalmed' or 'A Star is Entombed' or simply 'A Star is Lost'...One loses sight of the ostensible dramatic tragedy, because the real tragedy appears to be Streisand's misuse of her talent."

Geoff Brown of The Monthly Film Bulletin faulted the film for "Streisand's failure to convince as a rock star, even when singing the docile brand of rock supplied here. Luckily, Kris Kristofferson makes a far better impression. His eyes have the proper faraway look that betokens a mind besotted either with booze or love, and he drifts toward his destiny with none of James Mason's fireworks but with a great deal of quiet charm."

In the Mad issue #193, dated September 1977, the movie was parodied in the "Rock of Aged Department" section as "A Star's A Bomb."

==== 21st-century reviews ====
On the review aggregator website Rotten Tomatoes, 37% of 43 critics' reviews of the film are positive, with an average rating of 5.4/10; the site's critics consensus states: "A lack of memorable music, chemistry between its leads, and an overlong runtime prompts this modish iteration of A Star is Born to fizzle out quickly." On Metacritic, the film has a weighted average score of 58 out of 100 based on reviews from 8 critics, indicating "mixed or average" reviews.

=== Awards and nominations ===
Award	Category	Nominee(s)	Result	Ref.
Academy Awards	Best Cinematography	Robert Surtees	Nominated	
Academy Awards	Best Original Song Score and Its Adaptation or Adaptation Score	Roger Kellaway	Nominated	
Academy Awards	Best Original Song	"Evergreen (Love Theme from A Star Is Born)"; Music by Barbra Streisand; Lyrics by Paul Williams	Won	
Academy Awards	Best Sound	Robert Knudson, Dan Wallin, Robert Glass, and Tom Overton	Nominated	
ASCAP Film and Television Music Awards	Most Performed Feature Film Standards	"Evergreen (Love Theme from A Star Is Born)"; Music by Barbra Streisand; Lyrics by Paul Williams	Won	
British Academy Film Awards	Anthony Asquith Award for Original Film Music	Paul Williams, Barbra Streisand, Kenny Ascher, Rupert Holmes, Leon Russell, Kenny Loggins, Alan Bergman, Marilyn Bergman, and Donna Weiss	Nominated	
British Academy Film Awards	Best Soundtrack	Robert Glass, Robert Knudson, Marvin Kosberg, Tom Overton, Joseph Von Stroheim, and Dan Wallin	Nominated	
Golden Globe Awards	Best Motion Picture – Musical or Comedy		Won	
Golden Globe Awards	Best Actor in a Motion Picture – Musical or Comedy	Kris Kristofferson	Won	
Golden Globe Awards	Best Actress in a Motion Picture – Musical or Comedy	Barbra Streisand	Won	
Golden Globe Awards	Best Original Score – Motion Picture	Kenny Ascher and Paul Williams	Won	
Golden Globe Awards	Best Original Song – Motion Picture	"Evergreen (Love Theme from A Star Is Born)"; Music by Barbra Streisand; Lyrics by Paul Williams	Won	
Grammy Awards	Record of the Year	"Evergreen (Love Theme from A Star Is Born)"; Phil Ramone and Barbra Streisand	Nominated	
Grammy Awards	Song of the Year	"Evergreen (Love Theme from A Star Is Born)"; Barbra Streisand and Paul Williams	Won (Note: Tied with "You Light Up My Life".)	
Grammy Awards	Best Pop Vocal Performance, Female	"Evergreen (Love Theme from A Star Is Born)" – Barbra Streisand	Won	
Grammy Awards	Best Original Score Written for a Motion Picture or a Television Special	A Star Is Born – Kenny Ascher, Alan Bergman, Marilyn Bergman, Rupert Holmes, Leon Russell, Barbra Streisand, Donna Weiss, Paul Williams, and Kenny Loggins	Nominated	

In the 1937 and 1954 versions of A Star is Born, the characters played by Janet Gaynor and Judy Garland were each depicted on screen winning an Academy Award. Both actresses were nominated for the Academy Award for Best Actress for their work in their respective films, but neither won (though Gaynor had won previously, and Garland had won an Academy Juvenile Award). In this film, the character played by Barbra Streisand is instead depicted as winning a Grammy Award, and, in real life, the film's song "Evergreen" won her both a Grammy Award for Song of the Year and an Academy Award for Best Original Song.

The film is recognized by American Film Institute in these lists:

- 2004: AFI's 100 Years...100 Songs:
  - "Evergreen (Love Theme from A Star Is Born)" – #16

== Soundtrack ==
The film's soundtrack album was released by Columbia Records in 1976.

== Remakes ==
A Star Is Born was the second remake of the original 1937 drama, the prior being the 1954 musical starring Judy Garland and James Mason. Bradley Cooper later starred in, directed, co-wrote, and co-produced a 2018 retelling, with Lady Gaga co-starring and composing new music. The four official A Star is Born films were, collectively, nominated for 25 Academy Awards, at least four each. The story was also adapted as the 2013 Bollywood film Aashiqui 2.

In August 2021, while promoting her upcoming album, Streisand suggested that the 2018 film was unoriginal and the “wrong idea,” despite her version also being a remake and her clear and apparent support and praise of the project both during production and after its release.

== Home media ==
A Star Is Born was first released on Region 1 DVD in North America on December 19, 2006, by Warner Bros. Discovery Home Entertainment. This edition featured a Dolby Digital 5.1 audio track and included several bonus features: a full-length audio commentary by Barbra Streisand, approximately 16 minutes of deleted and alternate scenes, wardrobe test footage, and theatrical trailers.

Subsequent DVD releases included a Region 2 edition in Germany in 2007 and a Region 4 edition in Australia in 2008, both containing the same supplemental materials as the Region 1 release.

On February 5, 2013, Warner Bros. Discovery Home Entertainment released the film on Blu-ray in a DigiBook format. This edition retained all the special features from the DVD release, including Streisand's commentary and the additional footage.

Later, on May 14, 2019, the Warner Archive Collection reissued A Star Is Born on both DVD and Blu-ray as manufacture-on-demand titles. These reissues featured the same content as the previous editions.
