= Hooked on You (song) =

Single by Bread

from the album Lost Without Your Love
- B-side: "Our Lady of Sorrow"
- Released: March 1977
- Genre: Soft rock
- Length: 2:18
- Label: Elektra
- Songwriter: David Gates
- Producer: David Gates

Bread singles chronology
"Lost Without Your Love" (1976)	"Hooked on You" (1977)

"Hooked on You" is a song written and composed by David Gates, and originally recorded by the soft rock group Bread, of which Gates was the leader and primary music producer. It was the second single released from Bread's 1977 album Lost Without Your Love, and became their final charting hit.

The song reached No. 60 on the U.S. Billboard Hot 100 during the spring of 1977. In Canada, it reached No. 48. "Hooked on You" was a much bigger Adult Contemporary hit, spending two weeks at number one on the Canadian Adult Contemporary chart and three weeks at number two in the United States, where it was held off the top spot by Yvonne Elliman's "Hello Stranger".

== Chart performance ==
Chart (1977)	Peak position
Canada RPM Adult Contemporary	1
Canada RPM Top Singles	48
U.S. Billboard Hot 100	60
U.S. Billboard Easy Listening	2
U.S. Cash Box Top 100	72
