= Evergreen (Love Theme from A Star Is Born) =

Single by Barbra Streisand

from the album A Star Is Born
- B-side: "I Believe In Love"
- Released: December 1976
- Recorded: 1976
- Studio: A&M (Hollywood, California)
- Genre: Vocal pop
- Length: 3:04
- Label: Columbia
- Songwriters: Barbra Streisand; Paul Williams
- Producers: Barbra Streisand; Phil Ramone

Barbra Streisand singles chronology
"Shake Me, Wake Me (When It's Over)" (1975)	"Evergreen" (1976)	"My Heart Belongs to Me" (1977)

Music video
- "“Evergreen” from A Star Is Born” (1976)" on YouTube

"Evergreen" (also called "Love Theme from A Star Is Born") is the theme song from the 1976 film A Star Is Born. It was composed and performed by American singer, songwriter, actress and director Barbra Streisand with lyrics by Paul Williams, and arranged by Ian Freebairn-Smith. The song was released on the soundtrack album for A Star Is Born.

== Background ==
As composers, Streisand and Williams earned an Academy Award for Best Original Song, making Streisand the first woman to be so honored as a composer. She also earned a Grammy Award for Song of the Year. Streisand and Williams also won Golden Globes for Best Original Song.

The song's opening couplet, "Love, soft as an easy chair; love, fresh as the morning air", almost did not appear that way. Williams wrote the "morning air" line first, but told Streisand to "flip those two first lines, because it sings better".

In 2023, American Songwriter and The Guardian ranked the song number four and number three, respectively, on their lists of the greatest Barbra Streisand songs. Record World said that "Barbra is in fine voice."

In 1997, the track appeared on the tribute album Diana, Princess of Wales: Tribute.

== Chart performance ==
In the US, the single became Streisand's second number 1 single and spent three weeks at the top of the Billboard Hot 100 and six weeks atop the easy listening chart. This was Streisand's second number-one song on the Hot 100 (following "The Way We Were" in 1974), and her third on the adult contemporary chart ("The Way We Were" and 1964's "People"). In its year-end chart for 1977, Billboard ranked the platinum-certified single, which sold more than 2 million copies, the fourth-biggest single of the year. In the UK Singles Chart, the song peaked at #3 in 1977.

== Charts ==
=== Weekly charts ===
Chart (1976–1977)	Peak position
Argentina (Centro Cultural del Disco)	26
Australia (Kent Music Report)	5
Belgium (Ultratop 50 Flanders)	27
Canada Top Singles (RPM)	1
Canada Adult Contemporary (RPM)	1
Finland (Suomen virallinen lista)	29
Ireland (IRMA)	4
Italy (Musica e dischi)	16
Japan (Oricon)	59
Netherlands (Single Top 100)	18
New Zealand (Recorded Music NZ)	3
Spain Top 40 Radio	38
UK Singles (Official Charts)	3
US Billboard Hot 100	1
US Adult Contemporary (Billboard)	1
US Cash Box Top 100	1

=== Year-end charts ===
Chart (1977)	Rank
Australia	34
Canada Top Singles (RPM)	2
New Zealand	14
UK	16
US Billboard Hot 100	4
US Adult Contemporary (Billboard)	2
US Cash Box Top 100	6

=== All-time charts ===
Chart (1958–2018)	Position
US Billboard Hot 100	173

== Certifications ==
Region	Certification	Certified units/sales
Canada (Music Canada)	Gold	75,000^{^}
Japan	—	31,000
United Kingdom (BPI)	Silver	250,000^{^}
United States (RIAA)	Platinum	1,000,000^{^}
^{^} Shipments figures based on certification alone.

== Awards ==
At the 49th Academy Awards the song won the Academy Award for Best Original Song and Barbra Streisand became the only woman in history to win the Academy Award for Best Actress and the Academy Award for Best Original Song. At the 34th Golden Globe Awards the song won the Golden Globe Award for Best Original Song. At the 20th Annual Grammy Awards the song was nominated in three categories, winning in two for Best Pop Vocal Performance, Female and Song of the Year tying with "You Light Up My Life". The song was also nominated for Record of the Year.

== Other versions ==
Streisand also recorded versions of the song in Spanish ("Tema de Amor de Nace Una Estrella"), French ( "De rêve en rêverie") with lyrics by Eddy Marnay, and Italian ("Sempreverde") with lyrics by Luigi Albertelli. The Spanish version was released as a track on the 1996 CD single "I Finally Found Someone", a Streisand duet with Bryan Adams, and on the import CD version of the A Star Is Born remastered soundtrack. (The French and Italian versions have yet to appear on a CD release.)

Frank Sinatra recorded the song with Nelson Riddle and his orchestra on November 12, 1976, along with "I Love My Wife". However, it remains unreleased.

British singer Hazell Dean recorded a dance version of the song in 1984 which reached No. 63 on the UK Singles Chart.

Luther Vandross recorded a cover for his 1994 album Songs.

Kenny Rogers sang his own revival for his 1996 album Vote for Love.

In 2002, Philippine rap group Salbakuta sampled Streisand's single in their song "S2pid Luv".

Scottish singer Todd Gordon recorded a big band version with the Royal Air Force Squadronaires for the album Helping the Heroes (2012) produced by Ken Barnes.

In 2021, Randy Rainbow created a parody version titled "Marjorie Taylor Greene", as a satire about the congresswoman who traffics in conspiracy theories.

== See also ==
- List of Cash Box Top 100 number-one singles of 1977
- List of Billboard Hot 100 number-one singles of 1977
- List of number-one adult contemporary singles of 1977 (U.S.)
