= Torn Between Two Lovers (song) =

- French picture sleeve

Single by Mary MacGregor

from the album Torn Between Two Lovers
- B-side: "I Just Want to Love You"
- Released: November 1976
- Recorded: 1976
- Studio: Muscle Shoals Sound Studio in Alabama
- Genre: Soft rock
- Length: 3:40
- Label: Ariola
- Songwriters: Peter Yarrow; Phillip Jarrell
- Producers: Peter Yarrow; Barry Beckett

Mary MacGregor singles chronology
| "Torn Between Two Lovers" (1976) | "The Girl (Has Turned Into a Woman)" (1977) |

"Torn Between Two Lovers" is a song written by Peter Yarrow (of the folk music trio Peter, Paul & Mary) and Phillip Jarrell that speaks about a love triangle, and laments that "loving both of you is breaking all the rules". Mary MacGregor recorded it at Muscle Shoals Sound Studio in 1976 and it became the title track of her first album.

== Chart performance ==
"Torn Between Two Lovers" reached No. 1 on the U.S. pop chart in February 1977 and achieved the same position on the Easy Listening chart in the final week of 1976 and first week of 1977. It remained in the Billboard top 10 for ten weeks, and was ranked as the No. 10 song for 1977. It also hit No. 1 on the Canadian charts, and peaked at No. 3 on the country charts of both nations. In March 1977, it was No. 4 in the United Kingdom.

=== Weekly charts ===
| Chart (1976–1977) | Peak position |
|---|---|
| Australia (Kent Music Report) | 1 |
| Belgium (Ultratop 50 Flanders) | 14 |
| Canada Adult Contemporary (RPM) | 1 |
| Canada Country Singles (RPM) | 1 |
| Canada Top Singles (RPM) | 1 |
| Ireland (IRMA) | 5 |
| Netherlands (Single Top 100) | 11 |
| New Zealand (Recorded Music NZ) | 4 |
| South Africa (Springbok Radio) | 6 |
| UK Singles (Official Charts) | 4 |
| US Billboard Hot 100 | 1 |
| US Adult Contemporary (Billboard) | 1 |
| US Hot Country Songs (Billboard) | 3 |
| US Cashbox Top 100 | 1 |
| West Germany (GfK) | 40 |

=== Year-end charts ===
| Chart (1977) | Rank |
|---|---|
| Australia | 7 |
| Canada RPM Top Singles | 9 |
| New Zealand | 46 |
| UK | 58 |
| U.S. Billboard Hot 100 | 10 |
| U.S. Billboard Adult Contemporary | 19 |
| U.S. Cash Box | 5 |

== Certifications ==
| Region | Certification | Certified units/sales |
|---|---|---|
| Australia (ARIA) | Gold | 50,000^{^} |
^{^} Shipments figures based on certification alone.

== Cover versions ==
In 1977, Gracie Rivera recorded "Torn Between Two Lovers" as the first track for her debut album, Gracie. The song became a hit with Hongkongers and carved her name in their music scene in the '70s.

"Torn Between Two Lovers" has also been recorded by Johnny Rodriguez for his 1977 album Practice Makes Perfect, Anna-Lena Löfgren for her 1979 album Lev Som Du Lär and Anita Meyer for her 1984 album Face to Face. Connie Francis recorded "Torn Between Two Lovers" for her 1989 album release Where the Hits Are which was recorded at Muscle Shoals Sound Studio and contained a number of songs whose original versions were Muscle Shoals recordings. Sharon Cuneta recorded her version for her album Isn't It Romantic Volume 2 in 2007. Joey Sontz recorded his version for his debut album Chasing the Dream in 2012.

"Torn Between Two Lovers" has been rendered in a number of languages, including Cantonese, "中間人" by Faye Wong from the album Shirley Wong; German, "Zwischen zwei Gefühlen" by Penny McLean; Portuguese, "Só, entre dois amores" by Celly Campello (pt); Dutch, "Hulpeloos verloren" by Conny Vandenbos; French, "Drame entre deux amours" by Claude François; Swedish, "Ge mig dina tankar" by Wizex; and Spanish, "Entre dos amores" by Christie Lee.

The song was mentioned in the lyrics of Dolly Parton's 1984 country single "God Won't Get You".

== TV movie ==
"Torn Between Two Lovers" inspired the title of a television movie aired in 1979, starring Lee Remick, George Peppard and Joseph Bologna, in which the song is played.

== See also ==
- List of number-one adult contemporary singles of 1976 (U.S.)
- List of Hot 100 number-one singles of 1977 (U.S.)
- List of RPM number-one singles of 1977
