= Mary MacGregor =

American singer (born 1948)

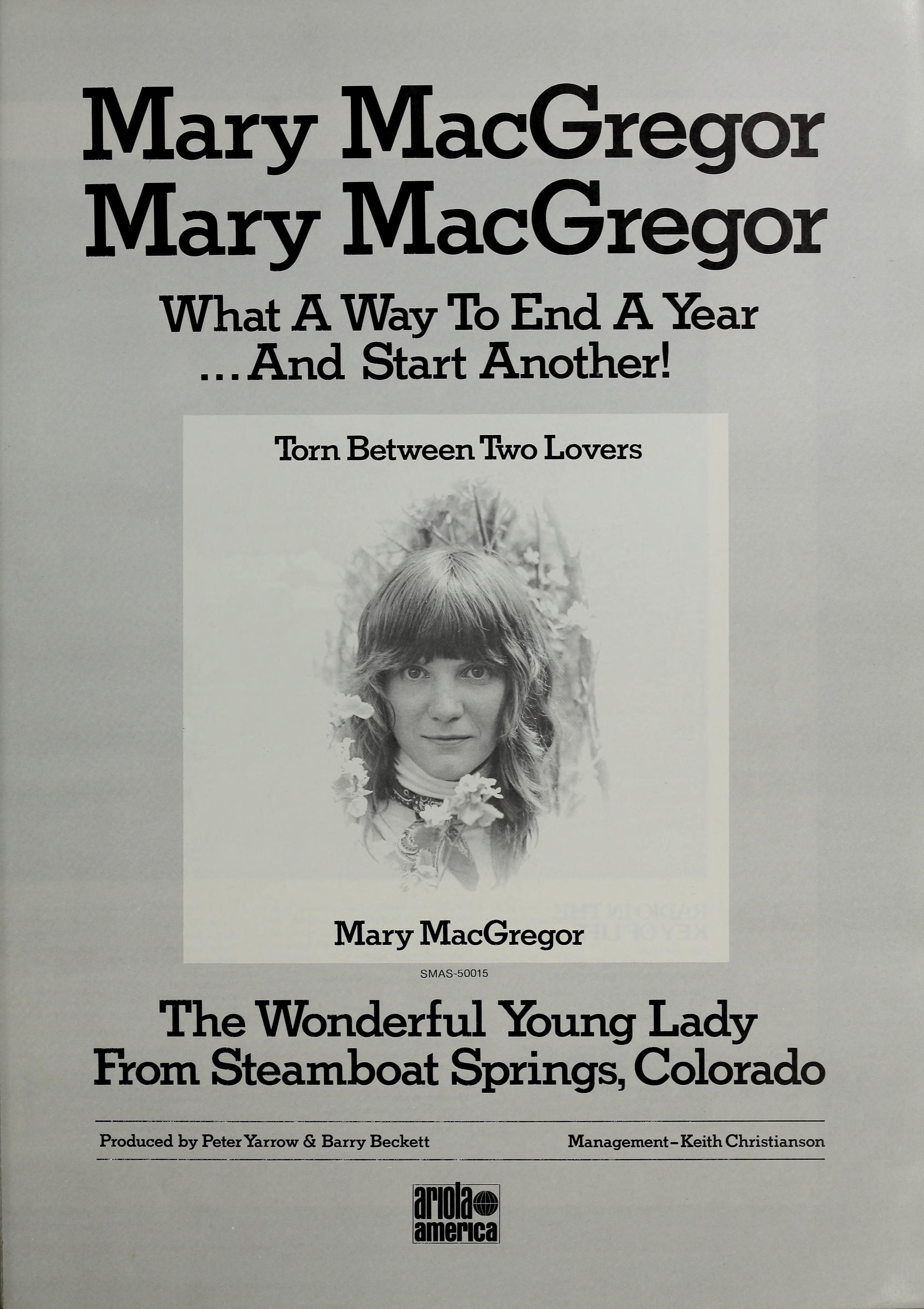
- Cashbox advertisement, December 25, 1976

Background information
- Born: May 6, 1948 (age 77); Saint Paul, Minnesota, U.S.
- Genres: Pop; country; folk; soft rock
- Years active: 1975–2000
- Labels: Ariola America; RSO Records

Mary MacGregor (born May 6, 1948) is an American singer. She is best known for singing the 1976 song "Torn Between Two Lovers", which topped the Billboard charts for two weeks.

== Career ==
MacGregor was born May 6, 1948, in St. Paul, Minnesota, United States. She began studying piano at age six, and was singing with bands by the time she was a teenager. After graduating from Saint Joseph's Academy in 1966, she briefly attended the University of Minnesota, and later began to tour the country with various acts and, in the process, catching the attention of Peter Yarrow from Peter, Paul & Mary. She soon joined Yarrow, singing backup on a solo tour, and made an appearance on his Love Songs album.

Signed to Ariola Records America, MacGregor released her debut single, "Torn Between Two Lovers", in late 1976; it became a smash hit by February 1977. The new year saw the single top both the pop and adult contemporary charts and was certified as a gold record. In addition, it reached #3 on Billboard's Country chart and also reached No. 4 on the UK Singles Chart. Two further singles from the album of the same name, also written and produced by Yarrow, charted but were overwhelmed by the success of the title track.

MacGregor admitted in The Billboard Book of Number One Hits by Fred Bronson that she hated her own chart-topper, chiefly because she had little sympathy for the narrator of "Torn Between Two Lovers", a woman who confesses to her husband that she is having an affair, but pleads with her husband to stay with her and accept the situation. MacGregor also said that the song indirectly led to the breakup of her own marriage, because her career kept her away from home so often that her relationship with her husband strained, and they decided to separate. She did acknowledge that the song was successful because it appealed to listeners who had found themselves in the situation described in the lyrics.

She released several more albums, and had three more minor chart singles (including the song "Good Friend" from the 1979 Bill Murray film Meatballs). "Good Friend" was later added to her third and self-titled final album.

In 1980, MacGregor won best song and best performance at the World Popular Song Festival in Tokyo, Japan with "What's the Use" which she had co-written with David Bluefield.

For the 1981 Japanese anime film Adieu Galaxy Express 999, MacGregor wrote and performed two songs. They were "Sayonara" and "Love Light".

In 1983, Mike Love (of The Beach Boys) and MacGregor performed "Do You Hear What I Hear" from Scrooge's Rock N Roll Christmas.

In the mid-1980s, MacGregor performed in nightclubs around the Central Coast of California with Mary and the Blue Jays, a trio composed of MacGregor, James Royce on bass, and Jim Kennedy on guitar.

In 1999, she teamed up with fellow musician friends, Joe Ghiglia and John Holt, to form The Mary MacGregor Band. The result was an album called Perfect Yellow House.

She is also mentioned in the liner notes of 1976's The Steamboat Album as doing vocals for one of the tracks, "Rabbit Ears". The album was recorded by Yampa River Records in Steamboat Springs, Colorado.

She now lives in California, has remarried, has two children and is retired.

== Discography ==
=== Albums ===
Year	Album	Chart positions					Label
Year	Album	US	US Country	AUS	CAN	UK	Label
1976	Torn Between Two Lovers	17	3	35	28	59	Ariola
1978	...In Your Eyes	—	—	—	—	—	Ariola
1979	Mary MacGregor's Greatest Hits	—	—	—	—	—	Ariola
1980	Mary MacGregor	—	—	—	—	—	RSO
"—" denotes releases that did not chart or were not released in that territory.

=== Singles ===
Year	Title	Chart positions								Album
Year	Title	US	US AC	US Country	AUS	CAN	CAN AC	CAN Country	UK	Album
1976	"Torn Between Two Lovers"	1	1	3	1	1	1	3	4	Torn Between Two Lovers
1977	"This Girl (Has Turned into a Woman)"	46	27	36	—	60	23	38	—	Torn Between Two Lovers
1977	"For a While"	90	38	86	100	77	14	—	—	Torn Between Two Lovers
1978	"I've Never Been to Me"	—	29	—	—	—	29	—	—	In Your Eyes
1978	"Memories"	—	—	—	—	—	—	—	—	In Your Eyes
1978	"The Wedding Song (There Is Love)"	81	23	—	—	—	—	—	—	Mary MacGregor's Greatest Hits
1979	"Good Friend"	39	11	—	—	86	6	—	—	Mary MacGregor
1980	"Dancing Like Lovers"	72	31	—	—	—	—	—	—	Mary MacGregor
1980	"Somebody Please"	—	—	—	—	—	—	—	—	Mary MacGregor
1981	"Sayonara"	—	—	—	—	—	—	—	—	Adieu Galaxy Express 999 (OST)
"—" denotes releases that did not chart or were not released in that territory.
