= You Don't Have to Be a Star (To Be in My Show) =

1976 single by Marilyn McCoo and Billy Davis Jr

- French release cover

Single by Marilyn McCoo and Billy Davis Jr.

from the album I Hope We Get to Love in Time
- B-side: "We've Got to Get it On Again"
- Released: September 1976
- Genre: R&B; soul
- Length: 4:41 (Album version); 3:40 (Single version)
- Label: ABC Records
- Songwriters: James Dean, John Glover
- Producer: Don Davis

Marilyn McCoo and Billy Davis Jr. singles chronology
"I Hope We Get to Love in Time" (1976)	"You Don't Have to Be a Star (To Be in My Show)" (1976)	"Your Love" (1977)

Alternative release
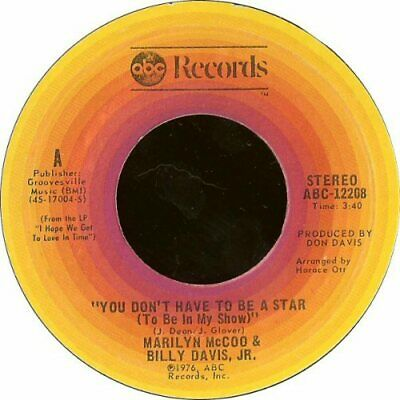
- Side A of the US single

Audio
- "You Don't Have to Be a Star" on YouTube

"You Don't Have to Be a Star (To Be in My Show)" is a song written by former Motown songwriters James Dean and John Glover and popularized by the husband/wife duo of Marilyn McCoo and Billy Davis Jr., former members of the vocal group The 5th Dimension. Released from their album, I Hope We Get to Love in Time, it became a crossover success. It spent six months on the charts, soaring to No. 1 on both the Billboard Hot 100 and Hot Soul Singles charts during late 1976 and early 1977. It also reached No. 6 on Billboard's Easy Listening chart and No. 7 on the UK Singles Chart. It would eventually be certified gold, selling over one million copies, and winning the couple a Grammy Award for Best R&B Performance by a Duo or Group with Vocals in 1977.

== Personnel ==
- Marilyn McCoo – vocals
- Billy Davis Jr. – vocals
- James Jamerson – bass
- Horace Ott – concertmaster/ arranger

== Charts ==
=== Weekly charts ===
Chart (1976–1977)	Peak position
Australia (Kent Music Report)	21
Canada Top Singles (RPM)	1
Canada Adult Contemporary (RPM)	3
Ireland (IRMA)	8
New Zealand	5
UK Singles (Official Charts)	7
US Billboard Hot 100	1
US R&B/Soul (Billboard)	1
US Easy Listening (Billboard)	6

=== Year-end charts ===
Chart (1977)	Rank
Australia	137
Canada Top Singles (RPM)	33
New Zealand	37
UK	98
US Billboard Hot 100	27

== Other versions ==
- Geri Reischl and Barry Williams performed the song in a 1977 episode of The Brady Bunch Variety Hour.
- In 1978, Ralph Carter and Janet Jackson performed it in the Season 5 finale of the CBS sitcom Good Times. At the time, Carter and Jackson were 16 and 11 years old, respectively.
