= Billy Davis Jr. =

American singer and musician (born 1938)

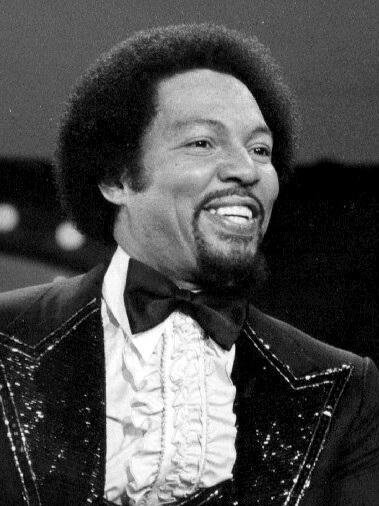
- Davis Jr. in 1977

Background information
- Born: June 26, 1938 (age 88)
- Origin: St. Louis, Missouri, US
- Genres: R&B; pop; soul; sunshine pop
- Occupations: Singer, musician
- Years active: 1950s–present
- Labels: ABC; CBS
- Formerly of: The 5th Dimension
- Spouse: Marilyn McCoo (m. 1969)
- Website: mccoodavis.com

Billy Davis Jr. (born June 26, 1938) is an American singer and musician, best known as a member of the 5th Dimension. Along with his wife, Marilyn McCoo, he had hit records during the 1960s and 1970s with "Aquarius/Let the Sun Shine In", "I Hope We Get to Love in Time", "Your Love", and "You Don't Have to Be a Star (To Be in My Show)".

Davis and McCoo were married in 1969. They became the first African-American married couple to host a network television series, titled The Marilyn McCoo & Billy Davis Jr. Show, on CBS in mid-1977, the year "You Don't Have to Be a Star (To Be in My Show)" won a Grammy Award.

== Career ==
Davis joined The 5th Dimension, then called The Versatiles, in 1966. The group's first big hit was with 1967's "Up, Up and Away", written by Jimmy Webb. The song won four 1968 Grammy Awards and was the title track to the 5th Dimension's first hit LP. A year later, the group recorded the song "Stoned Soul Picnic". A medley of "Aquarius/Let the Sunshine In" (from the musical Hair) reached No. 1 on the US Billboard Hot 100 chart in April to May 1969 and won the Grammy Award for Record of the Year.

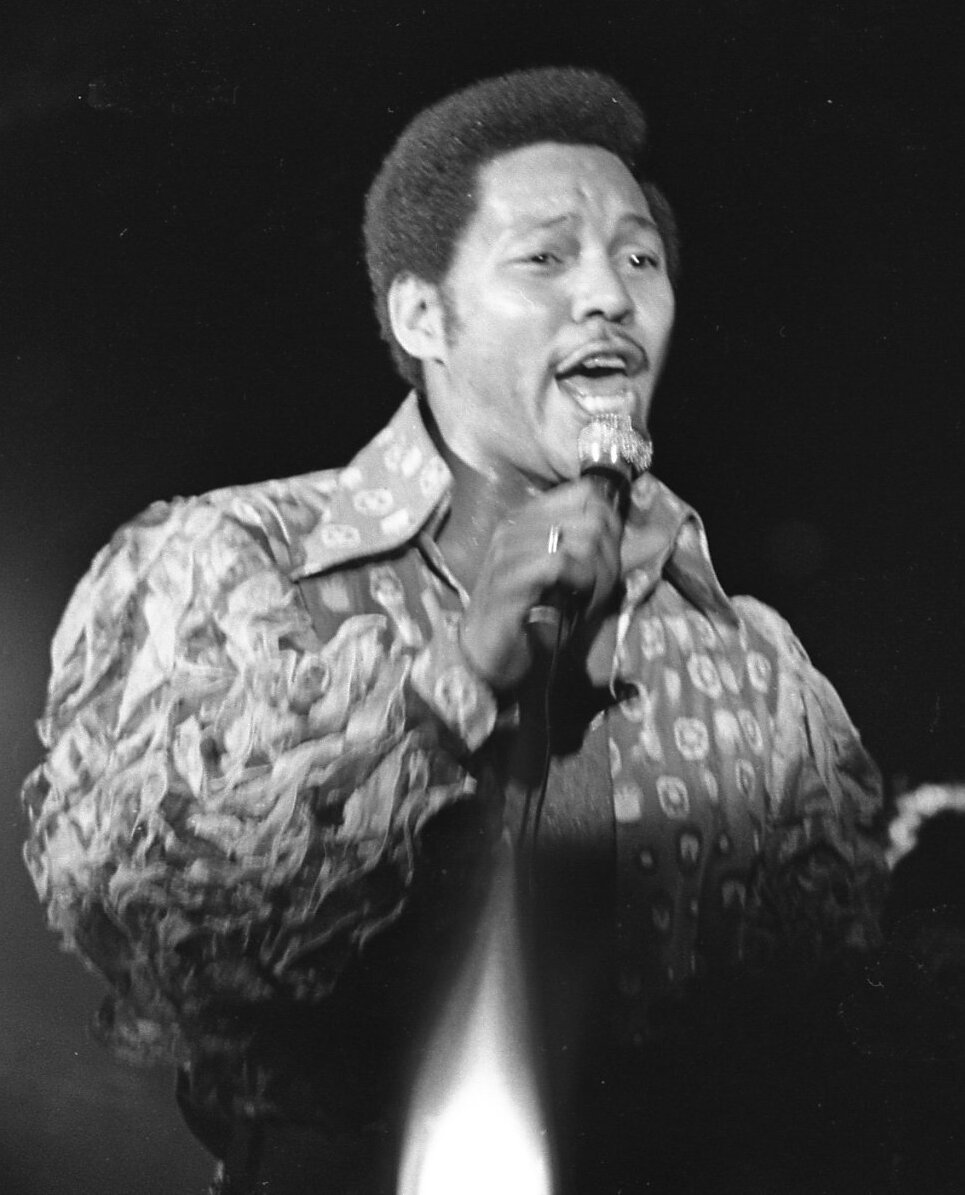
Davis performing in 1970

In 1975, Davis and McCoo left the 5th Dimension and began to perform as a duo. Landing a contract with ABC Records, they recorded their 1976 debut album I Hope We Get to Love in Time. The first single was the title track, which was a moderate hit. The follow-up "You Don't Have to Be a Star (To Be in My Show)" was an even bigger hit, reaching No. 1 on the US Billboard Hot 100 in January 1977. Davis and McCoo were awarded a gold single and a gold album as well as a Grammy Award for Best R&B Performance by a Duo or Group with Vocals. Davis and McCoo were featured in an episode of the TV variety show Captain and Tennille in the 1970s. They also appeared together on The Love Boat Season 2 Episode 6 which aired on October 21, 1978. The album Marilyn and Billy featured the song "Saving All My Love for You", later turned into a number one hit by Whitney Houston. Davis starred in the musical Blues in the Night at the Old Globe Theatre. In his guest appearances on the WB's Jamie Foxx Show in the 1990s, he and McCoo played the affluent parents of Foxx's girlfriend Fancy.

In 2020, Davis and McCoo released their first new album in 30 years, Blackbird: Lennon-McCartney Icons. Entrepreneur Kathy Ireland released the album through her record label EE1. The duo said it was a civil rights movement which became a human-rights movement with a goal to encourage people to come together during trying times, as it was recorded during the COVID-19 pandemic. During an interview about the album on June 29, 2021, Questlove called McCoo and Davis "the first couple of Pop and Soul". They would later appear in Questlove's Academy Award-winning directorial debut, Summer of Soul.

Davis also appeared alongside McCoo in the 2021 documentary Summer of Soul where they reflected on their participation in and the impact of the 1969 Harlem Cultural Festival. Davis and McCoo appeared as Brother William and Sister Harriet in The Waltons: Homecoming in 2021 and A Waltons Thanksgiving in 2022 on the CW network.

== Personal life ==
Billy Davis Jr. was born in St. Louis, Missouri. Davis and McCoo have been married for more than 57 years, since July 26, 1969. In 1999, he was diagnosed with prostate cancer.

== Discography ==
=== with Marilyn McCoo ===
Albums

Year	Title	Chart positions		Certifications
Year	Title	US	US R&B	Certifications
1976	I Hope We Get to Love in Time	30	7	RIAA: Gold
1977	The Two of Us	57	26	
1978	Marilyn & Billy	146	59	

Singles

Year	Title	Peak chart positions						Certifications	Album
Year	Title	US	US R&B	US A/C	US Dance	NZ	UK	Certifications	Album
1976	"I Hope We Get to Love in Time"	91	37	9	―	―	―		I Hope We Get to Love in Time
1976	"You Don't Have to Be a Star (To Be in My Show)"	1	1	6	—	5	7	RIAA: Gold	I Hope We Get to Love in Time
1977	"Your Love"	15	9	21	―	―	―		I Hope We Get to Love in Time
1977	"Look What You've Done to My Heart"	51	27	29	―	―	―		The Two of Us
1977	"Wonderful"	―	76	―	―	―	―		The Two of Us
1978	"My Reason to Be Is You"	―	92	38	―	―	―		The Two of Us
1978	"Shine On Silver Moon"	―	86	―	32	―	―		Marilyn & Billy
"—" denotes releases that did not chart or were not released in that territory.
