= All in Love Is Fair =

Song by Stevie Wonder

- 1974 Brazil single (White label)

Song by Stevie Wonder

from the album Innervisions
- A-side: "Too High"
- Released: August 3, 1973
- Recorded: November 10, 1972-April 4, 1973
- Studio: Record Plant, New York City; Mediasound, New York City
- Genre: Pop; R&B
- Length: 3:41
- Label: Tapecar; Tamla
- Songwriter: Stevie Wonder
- Producers: Stevie Wonder; Malcolm Cecil; Robert Margouleff

"All in Love Is Fair" is a song by American singer-songwriter Stevie Wonder recorded for his sixteenth studio album, Innervisions (1973). Written and produced by Wonder, it was released as a 7" single in Brazil in 1974. The song is a pop ballad with lyrics that describe the end of a relationship through the use of clichés. Critical reaction to the song has been varied: Matthew Greenwald of AllMusic wrote that it was among Wonder's "finest ballad statements", but Robert Christgau felt that the singer's performance was "immature". Wonder has included it on several of his greatest hits albums, including the most recent, 2005's The Complete Stevie Wonder.

American vocalist Barbra Streisand released "All in Love Is Fair" as a 1974 single from her The Way We Were studio album. Tommy LiPuma handled the production for the 7" single release by Columbia Records. Among music critics, Greenwald called her version "unforgettable". Commercially, the song peaked on the Billboard Hot 100 in the United States at number 63, and Canada's Top Singles chart at number 60. Other notable renditions include artists Brook Benton, Nancy Wilson, and Cleo Laine.

== Recording ==
Recording began for "All in Love is Fair" on November 10, 1972 at 2:30 A.M., with Wonder on acoustic piano and Scott Edwards on guitar. Electric piano, vocals, and drums were recorded on April 3, 1973. However, the electric piano track was discarded in favor of a new take made the following day. The song was mixed on April 8, 1973.

== Release and composition ==
"All in Love Is Fair" is taken from Stevie Wonder's sixteenth studio album, Innervisions, released on August 3, 1973, by Tamla Records. Despite not being released as a commercial single in his native country of the United States, Tapecar Records and Tamla released it as a 7" single sometime in 1974, exclusively in Brazil. It was paired alongside the opener track for side one of Innervisions, "Too High", a song about drug abuse.

The song is composed in the key of C-sharp minor. The vocal is accompanied by Wonder himself on Fender Rhodes, acoustic piano and drums, and by Scott Edwards on electric bass. The lyrics of the composition describe two people who are nearing the end of their relationship; Wonder purposely uses "cliché lines" to get his point across and to prove the clichés true.

A pop ballad, "All in Love Is Fair" was compared to the works of Johnny Mathis by Lenny Kaye of Rolling Stone and the editors at Playboy. Lawrence Gabriel, author of MusicHound Rock: The Essential Album Guide, described the track as a "classic" pop song. Janine McAdams from Billboard found "dramatic intensity" within the lyrics, "I should have never left your side / The writer takes his pen / To write the words again / That all in love is fair". Author Herb Jordan included the track's lyrics in his book Motown in Love: Lyrics from the Golden Era; they were placed under the section for songs in which the lyrics detail "lessons of love".

== Reception and further promotion ==
AllMusic's Matthew Greenwald found "All in Love Is Fair" to be among Wonder's "finest ballad statements", which contained "one of the most graceful and memorable hooks from the era". Brian Ives of radio.com described it as a "beautiful and sad piano ballad" that he thought could have come from the Broadway stage. Robert Christgau disliked Wonder's balladry singing in "All in Love Is Fair", and considered his performance to be "immature". In contrast, author James E. Perone wrote that there was "no better example" of a "pure, autobiographical-sounding vocal showpiece for Stevie Wonder".

After its initial release in 1973, Wonder placed "All in Love Is Fair" on several of his later albums. It was included on the Motown compilation Baddest Love Jams, Vol. 2: Fire & Desire in 1995. Wonder's fourth box set, At the Close of a Century (1999), also featured the song. In that same year it was featured on Ballad Collection, and in 2005 it was selected for inclusion on The Complete Stevie Wonder.

== Track listing ==
Brazil 7" single
No.	Title	Length
1.	"All in Love Is Fair"	3:41
2.	"Too High"	4:36
Total length:		8:27

== Personnel ==
Information is based on the album’s liner notes

- Stevie Wonder – lead vocal, acoustic piano, Fender Rhodes electric piano, drums
- Scott Edwards – electric bass

== Barbra Streisand version ==
"All in Love Is Fair"

Single by Barbra Streisand

from the album The Way We Were
- B-side: Medley: "My Buddy"/"How About Me"
- Released: March 1974
- Recorded: December 14, 1973
- Studio: United Recorders (Los Angeles, California)
- Length: 3:50
- Label: Columbia
- Songwriter: Stevie Wonder
- Producer: Tommy LiPuma

Barbra Streisand singles chronology
"The Way We Were" (1973)	"All in Love Is Fair" (1974)	"Guava Jelly" (1974)

=== Background and recording ===
American vocalist Barbra Streisand recorded a version of "All in Love Is Fair" for her fifteenth studio album, The Way We Were (1974). Shortly following the commercial success of her previous single, "The Way We Were", Columbia Records began compiling tracks for the singer's then-upcoming fifteenth studio album (The Way We Were). Since time was limited, the majority of the tracks were taken from material recorded by Streisand as much as seven years previously. According to the liner notes of her 1991 greatest hits album Just for the Record, the only tracks specifically created for the album were "All in Love Is Fair", "The Way We Were", "Being at War with Each Other", and "Something So Right". "All in Love Is Fair" was recorded on December 14, 1973, at United Recorders Studios in Los Angeles. It was released in March 1974 as a 7" single through Columbia Records, and would later be paired alongside Streisand's previous single, "The Way We Were", on a 7" single released in 1975, also by Columbia, in the United States and Canada.

=== Reception ===
The staff at Billboard described Streisand's cover as a "musical gem", while author Allison J. Waldman enjoyed Streisand's personal take on it. Record World said that "the ballad beauty from Stevie Wonder's Innervisions album gets its definitive female reading from the superstar." Greenwald from AllMusic liked the singer's cover and wrote of the song's hook, "Streisand's performance – particularly her phrasing of this line – is unforgettable". Stephen Holden from Rolling Stone compared her rendition to Wonder's version, describing it "almost as interesting as the original".

Streisand's version of "All in Love Is Fair" achieved moderate commercial success in the United States and Canada. It debuted on the Billboard Hot 100 on March 30, 1974, at number 81, becoming the week's "Hot Shot Debut", or the publication's highest entry position for that particular listing. It climbed the chart for an additional three weeks before reaching its peak position on April 20 of the same year, at number 63. The following week, Streisand's rendition dropped to number 75, after which it left the Hot 100. On the Adult Contemporary chart, which was then titled the Easy Listening chart, "All in Love Is Fair" peaked at number 10. On Canada's official chart, compiled by RPM, it debuted at number 99 for the week of April 6, 1974. It soared twenty places the following week, and two weeks later, on April 27, it reached its peak position at number 60. It also lasted a total of five consecutive weeks in this country.

=== Promotion ===
"All in Love Is Fair" has been included on numerous albums released by Streisand. Its first appearance after The Way We Were was on Barbra Streisand's Greatest Hits Volume 2 (1978). She also included it on Just for the Record (1991) and The Essential Barbra Streisand (2002).

=== Charts ===
Chart performance for "All in Love Is Fair"
Chart (1974)	Peak position
Canada Top Singles (RPM)	60
US Billboard Hot 100	63
US Adult Contemporary (Billboard)	10
US Cashbox Top 100 Singles	60

=== Track listings and formats ===
United States and United Kingdom 7" single

- A1 "All in Love Is Fair" – 3:50
- B1 Medley: "My Buddy"/"How About Me" – 4:09

United States promotional 7" single

- A1 "All in Love Is Fair" (Stereo) – 3:50
- B1 "All in Love Is Fair" (Mono) – 3:50

== Other versions ==
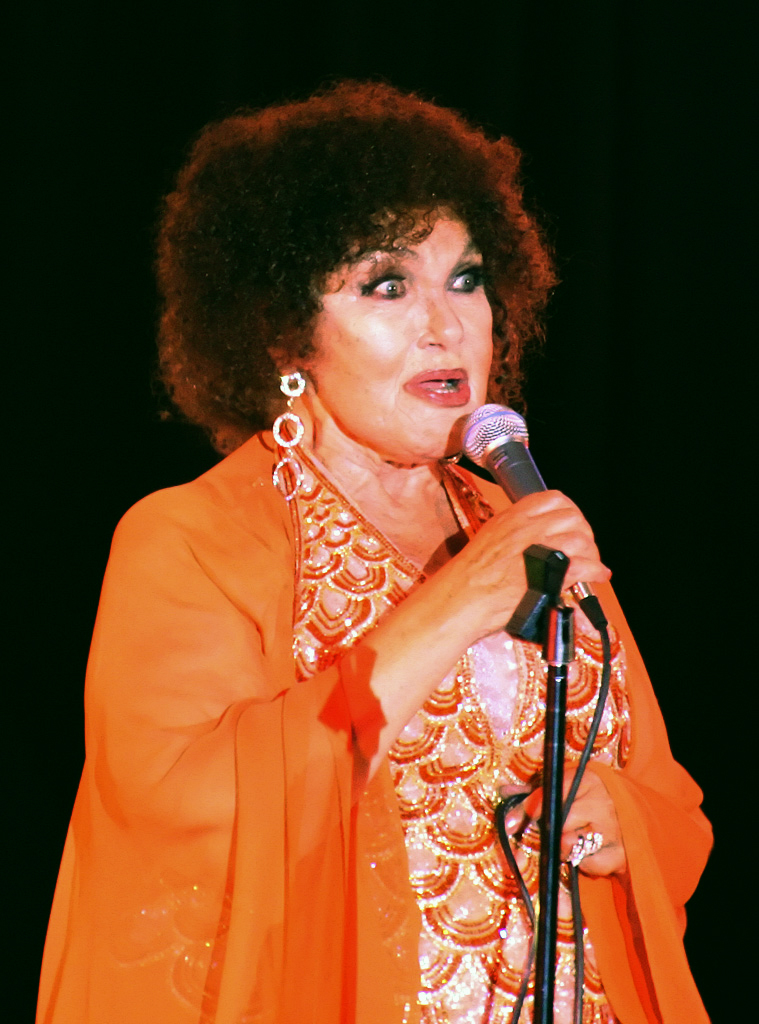
Cleo Laine recorded a cover of "All in Love Is Fair" in 1974

- Nancy Wilson recorded it as the title track for her 1974 studio album All in Love Is Fair. Wilson's recording has been described as "sensual" and it "wouldn't be out of place on Motown or Philadelphia International".
- Cleo Laine released the song as a standalone 7" promotional single in 1974, enlisting the help of Mike Berniker for production. It was included in her 2001 compilation album At Her Finest.
- Billy Eckstine's rendition was featured on his 1974 album If She Walked Into My Life.
- Cher performed the song on the first episode of the Cher show in February 1975.
- Shirley Bassey recorded the song for her 1975 album Good, Bad but Beautiful.
- Dionne Warwick included the song in her live repertoire, with a performance featured on her video release Dionne Warwick: Live in Cabaret July 18th 1975.
- Brook Benton recorded a version for his 1976 album This Is Brook Benton.
- Vibraphonist Cal Tjader and jazz singer Carmen McRae recorded it on their 1982 studio album Heat Wave, Tjader's final studio recording on Concord Jazz in 1982. The album peaked at 25 on Billboard's Jazz Albums chart.
- Latin vocal group, Barrio Boyzz recorded a version for their English language album debut, How We Roll, in 1995.
- American trombonist Slide Hampton and The World of Trombones recorded his own instrumental version of "All in Love Is Fair" for his 28th studio album, Spirit of the Horn (2002) which was recorded live at Manchester Craftsmen's Guild, Pittsburgh, Pennsylvania on May 3–5, 2002.
- The song is included on Michael McDonald's 2003 album Motown, and was included in his 2009 concert at the Royal Albert Hall, prompting John L Walters of The Guardian to write: "Surely you can't go wrong with songs as fantastic as Stevie Wonder's "I Believe" and "All in Love Is Fair".
