= List of awards and nominations received by Marvin Hamlisch =

Marvin Hamlisch awards and nominations
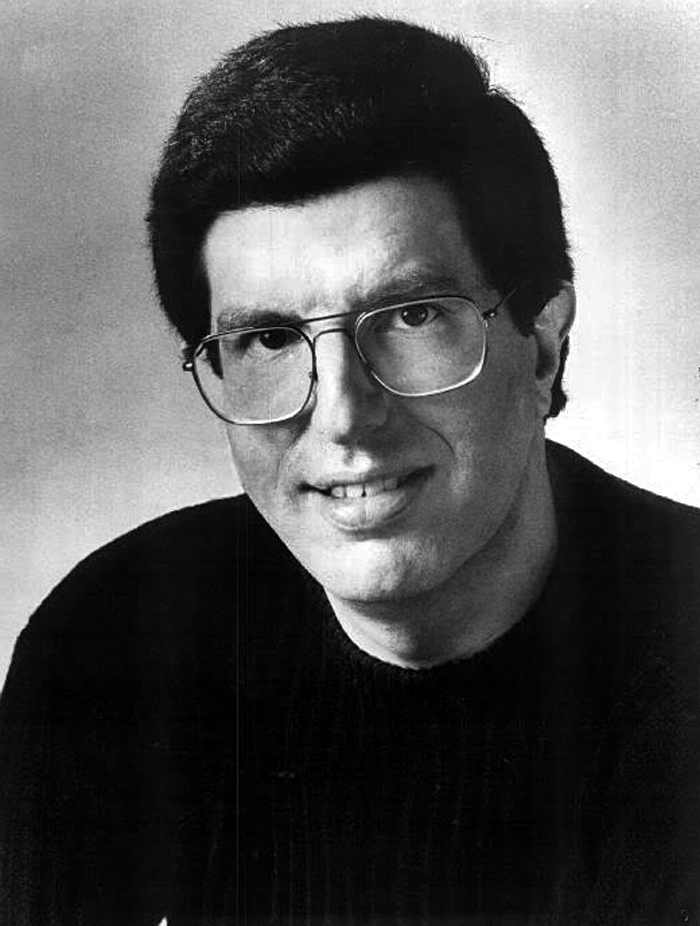
Hamlisch in 1970
Awards and nominations
Award	Wins	Nominations
Totals
Academy Awards	3	12
British Academy Film Awards	0	1
CableACE Awards	1	1
Chicago Film Critics Association	0	1
Critics' Choice Movie Awards	0	1
Drama Desk Awards	3	4
Golden Globe Awards	2	11
Golden Raspberry Awards	0	1
Grammy Awards	4	11
Houston Film Critics Society	0	1
International Film Music Critics Association	1	1
Online Film & Television Association	0	2
Online Film Critics Society	0	1
Primetime Emmy Awards	4	7
Pulitzer Prize	1	1
Satellite Awards	0	1
Tony Awards	1	2
Wins	20
Nominations	59

Marvin Hamlisch was an American composer and conductor. Over his career he became one of the few people to have completed the EGOT. He received four Emmy Awards, four Grammy Awards, three Academy Awards (Oscar), and a Tony Award. He also received a Pulitzer Prize making him and composer Richard Rodgers the only people to have won those five prizes (known collectively as "PEGOT"). He also won two Golden Globe Awards and was nominated for an BAFTA Award and a Critics' Choice Movie Award.

For his work on film, Hamlisch won three Academy Awards, his first for Academy Award for Best Original Score for The Sting (1973) and Best Original Score and Best Original Song for The Way We Were (1973) and its title song. He was Oscar-nominated for numerous film songs as well as the scores to The Spy Who Loved Me (1977), and Sophie's Choice (1982), with the former also receiving a nomination for the BAFTA Award for Best Original Music.

== Major awards ==
=== Academy Awards ===
Year	Category	Nominated work	Result	Ref.
1971	Best Song – Original for the Picture	"Life Is What You Make It" (from Kotch)	Nominated	
1973	Best Original Score	The Sting	Won	(Note: During the ceremony, Hamlisch became the second person to win three Academy Awards in the same evening, following Billy Wilder in 1960.)
1973	Best Original Dramatic Score	The Way We Were	Won	(Note: During the ceremony, Hamlisch became the second person to win three Academy Awards in the same evening, following Billy Wilder in 1960.)
1973	Best Song	"The Way We Were" (from The Way We Were)	Won	(Note: During the ceremony, Hamlisch became the second person to win three Academy Awards in the same evening, following Billy Wilder in 1960.)
1977	Best Original Score	The Spy Who Loved Me	Nominated	
1977	Best Original Song	"Nobody Does It Better" (from The Spy Who Loved Me)	Nominated	
1978	Best Original Song	"The Last Time I Felt Like This" (from Same Time, Next Year)	Nominated	
1979	Best Original Song	"Through the Eyes of Love" (from Ice Castles)	Nominated	
1982	Best Original Score	Sophie's Choice	Nominated	
1985	Best Original Song	"Surprise Surprise" (from A Chorus Line)	Nominated	
1989	Best Original Song	"The Girl Who Used to Be Me" (from Shirley Valentine)	Nominated	
1996	Best Original Song	"I Finally Found Someone" (from The Mirror Has Two Faces)	Nominated	

=== BAFTA Awards ===
Year	Category	Nominated work	Result	Ref.
British Academy Film Awards
1977	Best Original Film Music	The Spy Who Loved Me	Nominated	

=== Emmy Awards ===
Year	Category	Nominated work	Result	Ref.
Primetime Emmy Awards
1992	Outstanding Original Main Title Theme Music	Brooklyn Bridge (Episode: "When Irish Eyes Are Smiling")	Nominated	
1995	Outstanding Individual Achievement in Music and Lyrics	"Ordinary Miracles" (from Barbra: The Concert)	Won	
1995	Outstanding Individual Achievement in Music Direction	Barbra: The Concert	Won	
1999	Outstanding Music and Lyrics	"A Ticket to Dream" (from AFI's 100 Years...100 Movies)	Won	
2000	Outstanding Music and Lyrics	"Without You" (from AFI's 100 Years...100 Stars)	Nominated	
2001	Outstanding Music and Lyrics	"On the Way to Becoming Me" (from AFI Life Achievement Award: A Tribute to Barbra Streisand)	Nominated	
2001	Outstanding Music Direction	Barbra Streisand: Timeless	Won	

=== Golden Globe Awards ===
Year	Category	Nominated work	Result	Ref.
1971	Best Original Song	"Life Is What You Make It" (from Kotch)	Won	
1973	Best Original Song	"The Way We Were" (from The Way We Were)	Won	
1977	Best Original Score	The Spy Who Loved Me	Nominated	
1977	Best Original Song	"Nobody Does It Better" (from The Spy Who Loved Me)	Nominated	
1978	Best Original Song	"The Last Time I Felt Like This" (from Same Time, Next Year)	Nominated	
1979	Best Original Song	"Better Than Ever" (from Starting Over)	Nominated	
1979	Best Original Song	"Through the Eyes of Love" (from Ice Castles)	Nominated	
1989	Best Original Song	"The Girl Who Used to Be Me" (from Shirley Valentine)	Nominated	
1996	Best Original Score	The Mirror Has Two Faces	Nominated	
1996	Best Original Song	"I Finally Found Someone" (from The Mirror Has Two Faces)	Nominated	
2009	Best Original Score	The Informant!	Nominated	

=== Grammy Awards ===
Year	Category	Nominated work	Result	Ref.
1974	Song of the Year	"The Way We Were"	Won	
1974	Best New Artist	—N/a	Won	
1974	Best Pop Instrumental Performance	"The Entertainer"	Won	
1974	Best Score Soundtrack for Visual Media	The Way We Were: Original Soundtrack Recording	Won	
1975	Best Cast Show Album	A Chorus Line	Nominated	
1977	Song of the Year	"Nobody Does It Better"	Nominated	
1977	Best Score Soundtrack for Visual Media	The Spy Who Loved Me	Nominated	
1977	Best Instrumental Composition	"Bond '77/James Bond Theme"	Nominated	
1979	Best Score Soundtrack for Visual Media	Ice Castles	Nominated	
1979	Best Cast Show Album	They're Playing Our Song	Nominated	
1989	Best Song Written for Visual Media	"The Girl Who Used to Be Me" (from Shirley Valentine)	Nominated	

=== Tony Awards ===
Year	Category	Nominated work	Result	Ref.
1976	Best Original Score	A Chorus Line	Won	
2002	Best Original Score	Sweet Smell of Success	Nominated	

== Miscellaneous awards ==
Year	Award	Category	Nominated work	Result	Ref.
1994	CableACE Awards	Original Song	"Ordinary Miracles" (from Barbra: The Concert)	Won	
1976	Drama Desk Award	Outstanding Lyrics	A Chorus Line	Won	
1976	Drama Desk Award	Outstanding Music	A Chorus Line	Won	
1993	Drama Desk Award	Outstanding Music	The Goodbye Girl	Won	
2002	Drama Desk Award	Outstanding Music	Sweet Smell of Success	Nominated	
1981	Golden Raspberry Awards	Worst Original Song	"Hearts, Not Diamonds" (from The Fan)	Nominated	
2009	Satellite Awards	Best Original Score	The Informant!	Nominated	

== Critics awards ==
Year	Award	Category	Nominated work	Result	Ref.
2009	Chicago Film Critics Association	Best Original Score	The Informant!	Nominated	
2009	Critics' Choice Movie Awards	Best Score	The Informant!	Nominated	
2009	Houston Film Critics Society	Best Original Score	The Informant!	Nominated	
2009	International Film Music Critics Association	Best Original Score for a Comedy Film	The Informant!	Won	
1996	Online Film & Television Association	Best Original Song	"I Finally Found Someone" (from The Mirror Has Two Faces)	Nominated	
2009	Online Film & Television Association	Best Original Score	The Informant!	Nominated	
2014	Online Film & Television Association	Film Hall of Fame: Support	—N/a	Inducted	
2009	Online Film Critics Society	Best Original Score	The Informant!	Nominated	

== Special honors ==
Year	Award	Result	Ref.
2008	American Theater Hall of Fame	Inducted	
2008	The Long Island Music and Entertainment Hall of Fame	Inducted	
1976	Pulitzer Prize for Drama for A Chorus Line	Won	
1986	Songwriters Hall of Fame	Inducted	
2009	World Soundtrack Award Lifetime Achievement Award	Won	
