= List of Academy Award trophies on public display =

The following table lists Academy Awards held in museums and public collections:

Year	Award	Award Recipient	Film	Current location	Country	Acquisition Date	Notes
1927/28	Best Actor in a Leading Role	Emil Jannings	The Last Command and The Way of All Flesh	Filmmuseum Berlin, Berlin	Germany	Unknown	
1930/31	Best Story	John Monk Saunders	The Dawn Patrol	Flight Museum, Seattle, Washington	United States	Unknown	Displayed alongside a jacket worn by Errol Flynn in the remake, eight years later.
1931/32	Honorary	Walt Disney	Creation of Mickey Mouse	The Magic of Disney Animation, Bay Lake, Florida	United States	Unknown	Displayed along with several other Academy Awards won by Disney. However, the others in the case are noted on their plaques as being replicas "for studio display case".
1932/33	Best Actress in a Leading Role	Katharine Hepburn	Morning Glory	National Portrait Gallery, Washington, D.C.	United States	2009	Displayed along with three other Academy Awards won by Hepburn.
1937	Best Story	William A. Wellman and Robert Carson	A Star is Born	Mugar Memorial Library, Boston, Massachusetts	United States	Unknown	Part of the Robert Carson Collection at the Howard Gotlieb Archival Research Center. Displayed on the fifth floor of the library.
1938	Best Adapted Screenplay	George Bernard Shaw	Pygmalion	Shaw's Corner, Hertfordshire	England	1950	Displayed alongside Shaw's Nobel Prize in a display case, covered by a green cloth.
1939	Best Actress in a Supporting Role	Hattie McDaniel	Gone With the Wind	Chadwick Boseman College of Fine Arts, Howard University, Washington, D.C.	United States	1952, replaced 2023	A plaque rather than a statue; stolen c.1969 and replaced by the Academy.
1942	Best Documentary Feature	John Ford	The Battle of Midway	International Spy Museum, Washington, D.C.	United States	Unknown	
1942	Best Documentary Feature	Ken G. Hall	Kokoda Front Line!	National Film and Sound Archive of Australia, Acton, Australian Capital Territory	Australia	2015	
1945	Best Documentary Feature	The Governments of Great Britain and the United States of America	The True Glory	Imperial War Museum North, Trafford Park, Greater Manchester	United Kingdom	Unknown	
1949	Best Costume Design, Color	Leah M. Rhodes	Adventures of Don Juan	Museum of the Gulf Coast, Port Arthur, Texas	United States	Unknown	Displayed in the Notable People Section of the Museum (second floor)
1951	Best Actress in a Leading Role	Vivien Leigh	A Streetcar Named Desire	Victoria and Albert Museum, London	United Kingdom	Unknown	Displayed in the theatre and stage exhibition.
1951	Best Documentary Feature	Olle Nordemar	Kon-Tiki	Kon-Tiki Museum, Oslo	Norway	1952	Displayed in the same room as the original Kon-Tiki raft. The film is screened every day at noon in the museum cinema.
1951	Honorary	Gene Kelly	Achievement in choreography on film	Mugar Memorial Library, Boston, Massachusetts	United States	Unknown	Part of the Gene Kelly Collection at the Howard Gotlieb Archival Research Center. Displayed on the fifth floor of the library.
1954	Best Actor in a Supporting Role	Frank Sinatra	From Here to Eternity	Sinatra restaurant, Encore Las Vegas, Las Vegas, Nevada	United States	Unknown	
1955	Best Effects, Special Effects	Walt Disney Studios	20,000 Leagues Under the Sea	Walt Disney: One Man's Dream, Bay Lake, Florida	United States	Unknown	Displayed with props from the film in a special case.
1959	Best Actress in a Supporting Role	Shelley Winters	The Diary of Anne Frank	The Anne Frank House, Amsterdam	Netherlands	1976	Donated by Winters to The Anne Frank House in 1976. Displayed inside the museum.
1959	Best Documentary Feature	Bernhard Grzimek	Serengeti Shall Not Die	Haus der Geschichte, Bonn	Germany	Unknown	
1959	Jean Hersholt Humanitarian Award	Bob Hope		Bob Hope Memorial Library, Ellis Island National Museum, New York City	United States	2008	Hope came to the United States through Ellis Island. The statuette is displayed with other Hope memorabilia at the library entrance.
1961	Best Actor in a Leading Role	Maximilian Schell	Judgment at Nuremberg	Deutsches Filmmuseum, Frankfurt am Main	Germany	2019	
1961	Best Short Subject, Cartoons	Dušan Vukotić	Surogat	Zagreb City Museum, Zagreb	Croatia	Unknown	Inside the Animation History exhibit.
1964	Best Actor in a Leading Role	Rex Harrison	My Fair Lady	Mugar Memorial Library, Boston, Massachusetts	United States	Unknown	Part of the Rex Harrison Collection at the Howard Gotlieb Archival Research Center. Displayed on the fifth floor of the library.
1964	Best Art Direction, Black-and-White	Vassilis Photopoulos	Zorba the Greek	Benaki Museum, Athens	Greece	2007	Displayed in the Ghika Gallery on the Third Floor.
1964	Best Documentary Short Subject	Charles Guggenheim	Nine from Little Rock	National Archives, Washington, D.C.	United States	2007	Displayed outside of The William McGowan Theater.
1966	Best Actor in a Leading Role	Paul Scofield	A Man for All Seasons	Victoria and Albert Museum, London	United Kingdom	2011	
1967	Best Actress in a Leading Role	Katharine Hepburn	Guess Who's Coming to Dinner	National Portrait Gallery, Washington, D.C.	United States	2009	Displayed along with three other Academy Awards won by Hepburn.
1968	Best Actress in a Leading Role	Katharine Hepburn	The Lion in Winter	National Portrait Gallery, Washington, D.C.	United States	2009	Displayed along with three other Academy Awards won by Hepburn.
1969	Best Documentary Feature	Bernard Chevry	Arthur Rubinstein - The Love of Life	Museum of the City of Łódź, Łódź	Poland	2001	Displayed with awards given to Arthur Rubinstein.
1971	Best Original Song	Isaac Hayes	Shaft	Stax Museum of American Soul Music, Memphis, Tennessee	United States	2011	"Sits on a pedestal in the museum not far from Hayes' custom 1972 gold-trimmed, peacock-blue Cadillac Eldorado"
1974	Best Music, Scoring Original Song Score and/or Adaptation	Marvin Hamlisch	The Sting	Thomas Jefferson Building, Library of Congress, Washington, D.C.	United States	2015	Displayed on the first floor at the library’s Music Division, in its Performing Arts Reading Room, along with all of Hamlisch's other awards.
1974	Best Music, Original Dramatic Score	Marvin Hamlisch	The Way We Were	Thomas Jefferson Building, Library of Congress, Washington, D.C.	United States	2015	Displayed on the first floor at the library’s Music Division, in its Performing Arts Reading Room, along with all of Hamlisch's other awards.
1974	Best Music, Original Song	Marvin Hamlisch	The Way We Were	Thomas Jefferson Building, Library of Congress, Washington, D.C.	United States	2015	Displayed on the first floor at the library’s Music Division, in its Performing Arts Reading Room, along with all of Hamlisch's other awards.
1978	Honorary	Museum of Modern Art Department of Film	Film preservation and promotion efforts	Museum of Modern Art, New York City	United States	1979	Awarded "for the contribution it has made to the public's perception of movies as an art form." Displayed in the lobby of the museum.
1981	Best Picture	David Puttnam	Chariots of Fire	National Media Museum, Bradford, West Yorkshire	England	Unknown	
1981	Best Actress in a Leading Role	Katharine Hepburn	On Golden Pond	National Portrait Gallery, Washington, D.C.	United States	2009	Displayed along with three other Academy Awards won by Hepburn.
1985	Best Art Direction	Josie MacAvin	Out of Africa	Irish Film Institute, Dublin	Ireland	1992	Donated to the IFI in 1992.
1988	Academy Scientific and Technical Award	Ray Dolby and Ioan Allen		Dolby Theatre, Los Angeles, California	United States	Unknown	
1989	Best Sound	Russell Williams II, Donald O. Mitchell, Gregg C. Rudloff and Elliot Tyson	Glory	National Museum of African American History and Culture, Washington, D.C.	United States	2015	Donated by Russell Williams
1990	Best Sound	Jeffrey Perkins, Bill W. Benton, Gregory H. Watkins and Russell Williams II	Dances with Wolves	National Museum of African American History and Culture, Washington, D.C.	United States	2015	Donated by Russell Williams
1990	Honorary	Myrna Loy		Mugar Memorial Library, Boston, Massachusetts	United States	1994	Part of the Myrna Loy Collection at the Howard Gotlieb Archival Research Center. Displayed on the fifth floor of the library.
2003	Best Foreign Language Film	Denys Arcand	The Barbarian Invasions	TIFF Lightbox, Toronto, Ontario	Canada	Unknown	Displayed near the entrance to the home of the Toronto International Film Festival
2003	Best Animated Short Film	Adam Elliot	Harvie Krumpet	Australian Centre for the Moving Image, Melbourne, Victoria	Australia	Unknown	Displayed in the Screen Worlds gallery.
2005	Best Adapted Screenplay	Larry McMurtry	Brokeback Mountain	Booked Up bookstore, Archer City, Texas	United States	2006	Displayed inside the entrance to McMurtry's bookstore, alongside his Golden Globe for the same screenplay. McMurtry died in 2021 and the bookstore reopened in 2024 as the non-profit Larry McMurtry Literary Center.
2005	Best Original Song	Three 6 Mafia	Hustle & Flow	Memphis Music Hall of Fame, Memphis, Tennessee	United States	Unknown	Displayed in the Three 6 Mafia exhibit.
Numerous	Varied	Walt Disney	Various works	Walt Disney Family Museum, San Francisco, California	United States	2009	Displays Disney's 27 individual Academy Awards.

== See also ==
- Academy Museum of Motion Pictures
