= Barbra Streisand...and Other Musical Instruments =

Studio album by Barbra Streisand
- Released: November 2, 1973
- Recorded: 1973
- Genre: World
- Length: 34:37
- Label: Columbia
- Producer: Martin Erlichman

Barbra Streisand chronology
Live Concert at the Forum (1972)	Barbra Streisand...and Other Musical Instruments (1973)	The Way We Were (1974)

Barbra Streisand...and Other Musical Instruments (also called just And Other Musical Instruments) is the fourteenth studio album by American singer Barbra Streisand. It was released on November 2, 1973, by Columbia Records. The album was made available following a 1973 live television special promoted to improve Streisand's image and sound. With world music as the primary genre, the album's instrumentation varies greatly; even items such as kitchen utensils were used to create melodies and beats. With a majority of the songs on the album being cover songs, Streisand also re-recorded various tracks that originated earlier in her career. Her manager, Martin Erlichman, was credited as the album's sole and executive producer.

The album received mixed reviews from music critics. A critic from Billboard liked Streisand's tone and vocals, but others felt as if the album was ultimately forgettable. Barbra Streisand...and Other Musical Instruments is Streisand's lowest selling studio album released by Columbia; it is also one of four studio albums released by the singer not to receive a certification from the Recording Industry Association of America. However, it peaked in the lower positions of both Canada and the United States. The album was eventually released as a CD in 1989.

== Background and development ==
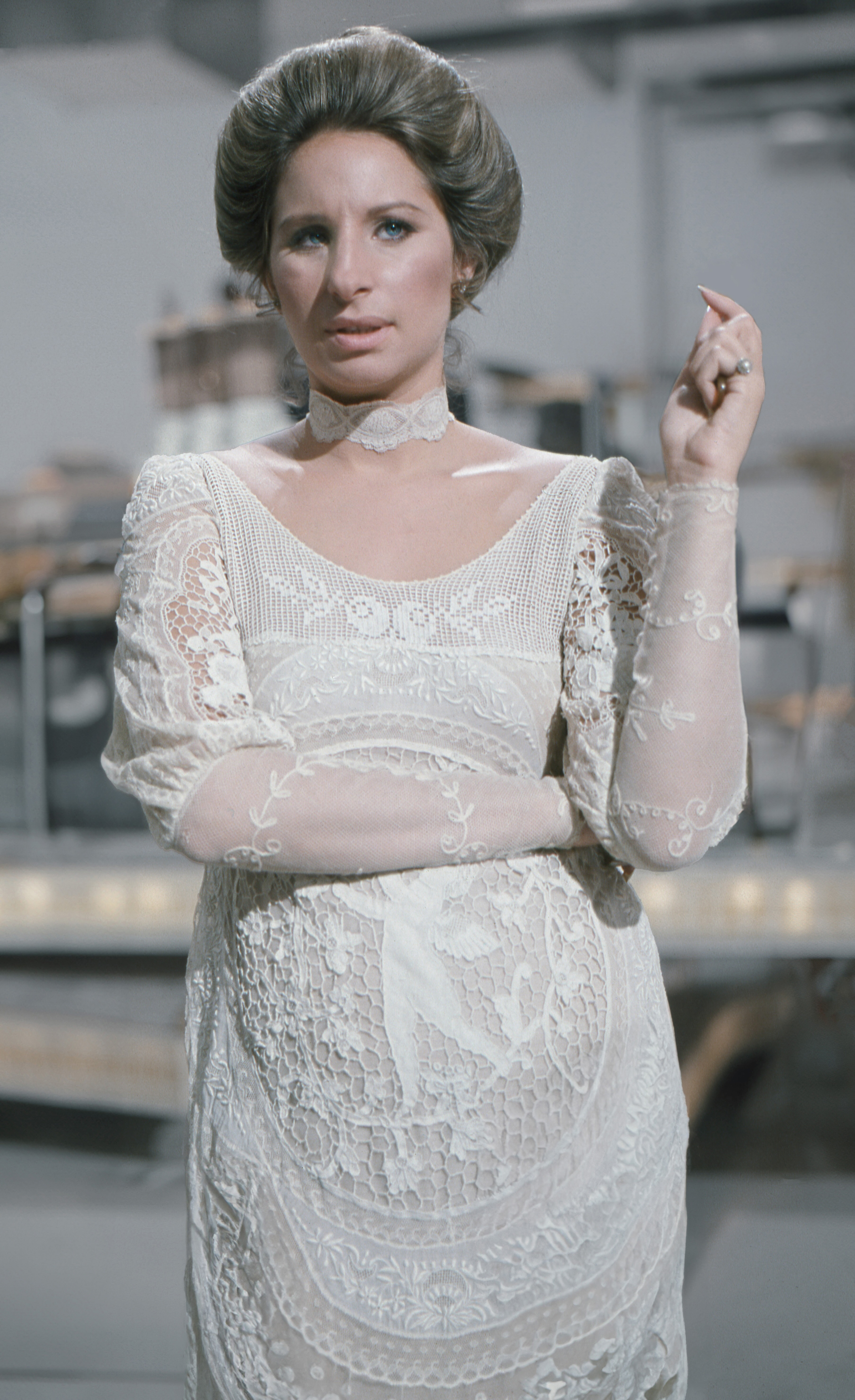
Barbra Streisand, 1973

Barbra Streisand...and Other Musical Instruments developed from her award-winning live television special in 1973 with the same title. Originally, Streisand had requested that her performance would be accompanied by several of "the world's greatest musicians", with Streisand listing Pablo Casals, Isaac Stern, and James Galway as examples; instead, CBS had her sing the music of different countries. They also made Streisand select one musician to work with for the project, and she picked Ray Charles. Recorded in London, the album was released to the public several months later. Allison J. Waldman, author of The Barbra Streisand Scrapbook, claimed that the singer used this appearance to "update her image and her music" which would be more appealing for the general public. Promotional efforts for the album included advertisements that described it as "the most special Barbra on record". The photography created for the album cover was tackled by Baron Wolman while Paul Perlow designed the inside cover and liner notes.

Despite the live television special featuring additional songs not included on the album itself, the special in its entirety was released on August 29, 2006, by Rhino Entertainment as a DVD album. The new songs include a medley of "Sing" and "Make Your Own Kind of Music", "Look What They've Done to My Song Ma", "Crying Time", a medley of "Sweet Inspiration" and "Where You Lead", and "On a Clear Day You Can See Forever". The version of "Crying Time" was a duet with Ray Charles; Streisand omitted this version from Barbra Streisand...and Other Musical Instruments but later featured a revised version on her sixteenth studio album, ButterFly (1974). Streisand and Columbia released Barbra Streisand...and Other Musical Instruments on November 2, 1973, as her fourteenth studio album overall, and her first since 1971's Barbra Joan Streisand. The album was later released in a compact disc format on October 24, 1989, and digitally to the iTunes Store many years later.

== Composition ==
As a whole, the album contains world music, which takes influence from various styles and genres, including African, Japanese, and Spanish music. It also contains the use of various items to create music, such as kitchen utensils. Additionally, Streisand included a few songs from her previous albums, such as her medley of "Sweet Inspiration" and "Where You Lead", which was previously featured on Live Concert at the Forum (1972). Other tracks like "I've Got Rhythm", "Glad to Be Unhappy", and "By Myself" were also used on the singer's studio albums from the 1960s. Streisand's manager, Martin Erlichman, was credited as the sole and executive producer of the album.

Barbra Streisand...and Other Musical Instruments opens with "Piano Practicing", a song adaptation by American television writer and pianist Lan O'Kun, from a classical composition by Paradisi. A raga version of George Gershwin and Ira Gershwin's "I Got Rhythm" succeeds it, followed by a medley samba consisting of "Johnny One Note" and "One Note Samba". Fourth and seventh tracks "Glad to Be Unhappy" and "Don't Rain on My Parade", respectively, contain "distorted" rhythms and melodies. A new version of "People", from Streisand's 1964 studio album of the same name, contains influence from Turkish and Armenian music. After "Don't Rain on My Parade" and "Don't Ever Leave Me", is a spoken track by Streisand titled "Monologue", which features dialogue of the singer speaking during the live television special. "I Never Has Seen Snow", written by Harold Arlen and Truman Capote, precedes Franz Schubert's Lied titled Auf dem Wasser zu singen. The final two tracks are the medley of "The World Is a Concerto" and "Make Your Own Kind of Music", with the album's closer ("The Sweetest Sounds") being accompanied by an "angelic" chorus.

== Critical reception ==
Professional ratings
Review scores
Source	Rating
AllMusic	3/5 stars
Entertainment Weekly	D

Barbra Streisand...and Other Musical Instruments received mixed reviews from music critics. In Billboard's "Top Album Picks" article, the album was selected for placement under the "Spotlight" column, where it received a lengthier review. The critic was positive of the release, claiming that Streisand's "fine tones and majestical power are sheer entertainment". The individual selected "Glad to Be Unhappy" as one of the best ballads in her career. AllMusic's William Ruhlmann awarded it three out of five stars, calling the album "more gimmicky than inventive" and ultimately a "forgettable misstep". He also found her medley of "The World Is a Concerto" and "Make Your Own Kind of Music" to be odd because its instrumentation consisted of sounds created by household appliances. Concluding, Ruhlmann claimed that Streisand's single release of "The Way We Were" helped erase any publicity for the album, which he considered a good thing.

Jim Farber from Entertainment Weekly was also critical of the album and gave it a "D" rating. Although he called it a "nice idea", he found the collection unnecessary and stated, "do we really need a Spanish version of 'Don't Rain on My Parade'?". Author Waldman wrote that the album was unsuccessful due to the singer being "dwarfed by the overproduction"; additionally, she felt that Streisand's duet with Ray Charles should have been included on the initial pressing, and Waldman also noted that there were "no new songs added" to the record. She stated that "the message was clear for Streisand ... keep moving forward".

== Commercial performance ==
Commercially unsuccessful, Barbra Streisand...and Other Musical Instruments is Streisand's lowest-selling album released by Columbia and one of four studio albums that have not been certified by the Recording Industry Association of America (the other three being 1969's What About Today?, 2011's What Matters Most, and 2016's Encore: Movie Partners Sing Broadway). In the United States, the album debuted on the Billboard 200 at number 146 for the week ending November 24, 1973. Within two weeks it rose 71 places to number 75, before reaching its peak position at number 64 on December 22. It spent a total of sixteen consecutive weeks on the Billboard 200. Paul Grein, writer of the "Chart Beat" column for Billboard, noted that Barbra Streisand...and Other Musical Instruments was one of Streisand's few releases to miss peaking within the top 15 of the chart. Meanwhile, the record entered Canada's chart (compiled by RPM) at number 81 on January 1, 1974. However, it dropped to number 88 the following week, and on February 2, 1974, it peaked at number 80, which was also the final publication that the album would appear on, totaling four weeks altogether.

== Track listing ==
All tracks produced by Martin Erlichman.

Barbra Streisand…and Other Musical Instruments – Standard edition
No.	Title	Writer(s)	Length
1.	"Piano Practicing"	Lan O'Kun (music by Pietro Domenico Paradisi from Sonata VI in A Major, movement Allegro)	2:27
2.	"I Got Rhythm"	George Gershwin; Ira Gershwin	1:24
3.	"Johnny One Note / One Note Samba"	Lorenz Hart; Richard Rodgers; A.C. Jobim; Newton Mendonça; Jon Hendricks	3:40
4.	"Glad to Be Unhappy"	Rodgers; Hart	2:43
5.	"People"	Jule Styne; Bob Merrill	1:51
6.	"Second Hand Rose"	Grant Clarke; James F. Hanley	0:16
7.	"Don't Rain on My Parade"	Styne; Merrill	3:41
8.	"Don't Ever Leave Me"	Jerome Kern; Oscar Hammerstein II	0:41
9.	"Monologue" (Dialogue)		0:46
10.	"By Myself"	Howard Dietz; Arthur Schwartz	1:54
11.	"Come Back to Me"	Alan Jay Lerner; Burton Lane	1:38
12.	"I Never Has Seen Snow"	Harold Arlen; Truman Capote	5:07
13.	"Lied: Auf Dem Wasser Zu Singen"	Franz Schubert	1:32
14.	"The World Is a Concerto / Make Your Own Kind of Music"	Ken Welch; Mitzie Welch; Barry Mann; Cynthia Weil	4:02
15.	"The Sweetest Sounds"	Rodgers	2:55
Total length:			34:37

Barbra Streisand...and Other Musical Instruments – 2006 DVD edition
No.	Title	Length
1.	"Sing / Make Your Own Kind of Music"
2.	"Piano Practicing"
3.	"I Got Rhythm / Johnny One Note / One Note Samba / Glad to Be Unhappy"
4.	"People / Second Hand Rose / Don't Rain on My Parade"
5.	"Don't Ever Leave Me"
6.	"Mogologue" (Dialogue)
7.	"By Myself"
8.	"Come Back to Me"
9.	"Look What They've Done to My Song Ma"
10.	"Crying Time" (with Ray Charles)
11.	"Sweet Inspiration / Where You Lead"
12.	"Lied: Auf Dem Wasser Zu Singen"
13.	"I Never Has Seen Snow"
14.	"On a Clear Day You Can See Forever"
15.	"The World Is a Concerto / Make Your Own Kind of Music"
16.	"The Sweetest Sounds"
Total length:		52:00

== Personnel ==
Credits adapted from the liner notes of the CD edition of Barbra Streisand...and Other Musical Instruments.

- Barbra Streisand – vocals
- Martin Erlichman – production
- Bill Schnee – mixing
- Ken Welch – arrangements
- Mitzie Welch – arrangements

== Charts ==
Weekly chart performance for Barbra Streisand...and Other Musical Instruments
Chart (1973–1974)	Peak position
Canada Top Albums/CDs (RPM)	80
US Billboard 200	64
US Cashbox Top Albums	46
