= Just for the Record... =

Compilation album by Barbra Streisand
- Released: September 24, 1991
- Recorded: 1955–1988
- Genre: Pop
- Length: 2:47:14
- Label: Columbia

Barbra Streisand chronology
A Collection: Greatest Hits...and More (1989)	Just for the Record... (1991)	Back to Broadway (1993)

Just for the Record... is a box set by American singer Barbra Streisand. It was released by Columbia Records on September 24, 1991. Just for the Record... includes a variety of performances throughout Streisand's career, including a song taken from her first studio recording session in 1955: a cover of "You'll Never Know". Other tracks were compiled from various live performances, TV specials, and previous albums from her back catalog.

Just for the Record... received positive reviews regarding its comprehensiveness of Streisand's overall career. Commercially, the album was equally successful, becoming the second best-selling box set in the United States by 1994, when it had sold over 404,000 units. It entered the Billboard 200 in the United States and peaked at number 38; it has also been certified Platinum by the Recording Industry Association of America (RIAA). In the Netherlands, Highlights from Just for the Record, a condensed version of the album, peaked at number 72.

== Background and release ==
Just for the Record... was released on September 24, 1991, by Columbia Records. It includes four discs, with each disc focusing on a different decade ("The 60s Part I", "The 60s Part II", "The 70s", and "The 80s"). It was initially priced at $79.98 USD and by 1994 was the second best-selling box set collection in the United States (behind only Led Zeppelin's 1990 self-titled box set) with approximately 404,000 copies sold. Serving as a retrospective of Streisand's three decade-spanning career, it features several songs from her catalogue in addition to previously unreleased tracks. Her first studio-recorded track ever, a cover of Mack Gordon and Harry Warren's "You'll Never Know" (1943), was featured as the album's opener track and was recorded in 1955. Howard Reich from PopMatters claimed that Streisand's cover proved that she already had had plenty of talent to become a recording artist, despite her young age. In addition to the four discs of material, Just for the Record... includes a 92-page color booklet featuring a variety of photos and artwork created throughout her career.

Among the previously unreleased material of Just for the Record... are live performances on The Jack Paar Show, P.M. East, The Garry Moore Show, The Tonight Show, The Ed Sullivan Show, and The Judy Garland Show. Duets with Judy Garland, Harold Arlen, Don Rickles, and Ryan O'Neal are also featured. As a whole, the performances featured on the collection range in year recorded from 1955 to 1988. A condensed version of the box set titled Highlights from Just for the Record was released sometime in 1992. It includes 24 of the songs from Just for the Record... and was priced significantly lower than the original collection.

== Reception ==
Professional ratings
Review scores
Source	Rating
AllMusic	4.5/5 stars
AllMusic; Highlights from Just for the Record	3/5 stars
Entertainment Weekly	A−

Just for the Record... received high ratings and praise from music critics. William Ruhlmann from AllMusic enjoyed the unique nature of the record and commented that because "she had complete creative control over th[e] retrospective", she was able to release a box set consisting of nearly only "rare [and] previously unreleased material". He also labelled the duets with Garland and "Las Vegas Medley" as some of the album's best tracks. In the publication's review of Highlights from Just for the Record, Ruhlmann was equally appreciative and noted that it serves as a "fine overview of Bab's career" and provides for a "great listening". Describing the large size of the collection, Entertainment Weekly's David Browne compared it to the two installments of Use Your Illusion (volumes I and II) by Guns N' Roses and claimed that it "is impossible to digest in one sitting". Browne ultimately awarded the collection a grade of A− and called it a good representation of the singer's ability to "chang[e the] definition of pop" and "make mainstream adult pop that was strong, elegant, [and] even passionate". Joe Brown from The Washington Post was more mixed towards the effort: "All four discs are dotted with oddities that even the most devoted Barbraphiles will program their CD players to skip after the first listen or two"; however, Brown appreciated some of the rarities on the album, including her duets with Garland and her melody of "My Man" and "Auld Lang Syne".

The box set entered and peaked on the Billboard 200 at number 38 on October 12, 1991, and was the week's fifth highest-peaking debut. It dropped to number 63 the following week and spent a combined total of 16 weeks on the chart. On November 19, 1991, it was certified Gold as a multi-disk package by Recording Industry Association of America (RIAA) for physical shipments of 125,000 copies; its certification was then upgraded to Platinum, signifying shipments of 250,000 copies, on July 8, 1992. As of June 2007, Just for the Record... had sold 454,000 box sets in the United States. The Highlights from Just for the Record version entered the album charts in the Netherlands, where it spent three weeks in total and peaked at number 72.

== Track listings ==
=== Just for the Record... ===
Disc one: "The 60's Part I"
No.	Title	Writer(s)	Taken from	Length
1.	"You'll Never Know"	Mack Gordon; Harry Warren	Studio recording, 1955	2:58
2.	"A Sleepin' Bee" (live)	Harold Arlen; Truman Capote	The Jack Paar Show, 1962	4:50
3.	"Moon River" (live)	Henry Mancini; Johnny Mercer	P.M. East, 1962	3:35
4.	"Miss Marmelstein"	Harold Rome	I Can Get It for You Wholesale, 1962	3:21
5.	"Happy Days Are Here Again" (live)	Milton Ager; Jack Yellen	The Garry Moore Show, 1962	3:50
6.	"Keepin' Out of Mischief Now" (live)	Andy Razaf; Thomas Waller	Bon Soir, 1962	1:48
7.	"I Hate Music" (live)	Leonard Bernstein	Bon Soir	1:11
8.	"Nobody's Heart (Belongs to Me)" (live)	Lorenz Hart; Richard Rodgers	Bon Soir	2:11
9.	"Value" (live)	Jeffrey D. Harris	Bon Soir	2:18
10.	"Cry Me a River" (live)	Arthur Hamilton	Bon Soir	3:53
11.	"Who's Afraid of the Big Bad Wolf?" (live)	Frank Churchill; Ann Ronell	Bon Soir	2:10
12.	"I Had Myself a True Love" (live)	Arlen; Mercer	Bon Soir	4:27
13.	"Lover, Come Back to Me" (live)	Oscar Hammerstein II; Sigmund Romberg	Bon Soir	1:48
14.	"Spring Can Really Hang You Up the Most" (live)	Fran Landesman; Tommy Wolf	The Tonight Show, 1963	3:48
15.	"My Honey's Lovin' Arms"	Joseph Meyer; Harry Ruby	The Barbra Streisand Album, 1963	2:13
16.	"Any Place I Hang My Hat Is Home"	Arlen; Mercer	The Second Barbra Streisand Album, 1963	2:44
17.	"When the Sun Comes Out" (live)	Arlen; Ted Koehler	The Ed Sullivan Show, 1963	3:36
18.	"Be My Guest / Dialogue" (with Judy Garland and Ethel Merman; live)	Mel Tormé	The Judy Garland Show, 1963	2:28
19.	"Judy Garland Medley, No. 1" (with Judy Garland; live)	Romberg; Hammerstein II; Arlen; Leo Robin; Henry Creamer; Turner Layton; Arthur Schwartz; Howard Dietz; George Gershwin; Ira Gershwin; Burton Lane; Ralph Freed; Ray Henderson; B.G. DeSylva; Lew Brown	The Judy Garland Show	4:34
20.	"Judy Garland Medley, No. 2" (with Judy Garland; live)	Arlen; Koehler; Ager; Yellen	The Judy Garland Show	2:28
Total length:				60:11

Disc two: "The 60's Part II"
No.	Title	Writer(s)	Taken from	Length
1.	"I'm the Greatest Star"	Bob Merrill; Jule Styne	Funny Girl, 1964	4:08
2.	"My Man / Auld Lang Syne"	Jacques Charles; Channing Pollock; Maurice Yvain; Albert Willemetz; Robert Burns	Funny Girl	4:08
3.	"People"	Merrill; Styne	People, 1964	3:40
4.	"Act II Medley" (featuring Diana Kind)	Grant Clarke; James F. Hanley; Harry Ruby; Rube Bloom; Harold Arlen; Johnny Mercer; Jimmy Cox; B. G. DeSylva; Lew Brown; Ray Henderson	My Name Is Barbra, Two..., 1965	4:27
5.	"1965 Emmy Awards" (live)		17th Primetime Emmy Awards, 1965	1:45
6.	"He Touched Me"	Ira Levin; Milton Schafer	My Name Is Barbra, Two...	3:09
7.	"You Wanna Bet"	Dorothy Fields; Cy Coleman	"Where Am I Going?" (single)	2:27
8.	"House of Flowers" (with Harold Arlen)	Arlen; Truman Capote	Harold Sings Arlen (With Friend), 1966	2:44
9.	"Ding-Dong! The Witch Is Dead" (with Harold Arlen)	Arlen; E.Y. "Yip" Harburg	Harold Sings Arlen (With Friend), 1966	1:55
10.	"Circus Medley"	Billy Barnes; Leslie Bricusse; Anthony Newley	Color Me Barbra, 1966	3:23
11.	"Starting Here, Starting Now"	Richard Maltby Jr.; David Shire	Color Me Barbra	2:54
12.	"A Good Man Is Hard to Find / Some of These Days" (live)	Eddie Green; Shelton Brooks	Belle of 14th Street, 1967	3:33
13.	"I'm Always Chasing Rainbows" (live)	Harry Carroll; Joseph McCarthy	Belle of 14th Street	2:34
14.	"Sleep in Heavenly Peace (Silent Night)" (live)	Franz Gruber; Joseph Mohr	A Happening in Central Park, 1968	2:58
15.	"Don't Rain on My Parade"	Merrill; Styne	Funny Girl, 1968	2:44
16.	"Funny Girl"	Merrill; Styne	Funny Girl	2:43
17.	"1969 Academy Awards" (live)		41st Academy Awards, 1969	1:58
18.	"Come Rain or Come Shine" (featuring Harold Arlen; live)	Arlen; Mercer	the Friars Club, 1969	2:48
19.	"Time After Time" (featuring Jule Styne; live)	Styne; Sammy Cahn	the Friars Club	2:36
20.	"Untitled" (featuring Don Rickles; live)		the Friars Club	1:13
21.	"The Sweetest Sounds" (featuring Richard Rodgers; live)	Richard Rodgers	the Friars Club	2:01
22.	"Hello, Dolly!" (featuring Louis Armstrong)	Jerry Herman	Hello, Dolly!, 1969	3:47
23.	"On a Clear Day (You Can See Forever)"	Burton Lane; Alan Jay Lerner	On a Clear Day You Can See Forever, 1970	2:10
24.	"Las Vegas Medley" (live)	A. Newley; Herbert Kretzmer; David Mann; Bob Hilliard	the International Hotel, 1969	4:05
Total length:				69:50

Disc three: "The 70's"
No.	Title	Writer(s)	Taken from	Length
1.	"The Singer"	Walter Marks	Previously unreleased	2:43
2.	"I Can Do It"	Johnny Worth	Previously unreleased	2:38
3.	"Stoney End"	Laura Nyro	Stoney End, 1971	2:58
4.	"(They Long to Be) Close to You" (featuring Burt Bacharach; live)	Burt Bacharach; Hal David	The Burt Bacharach Special, 1971	3:35
5.	"We've Only Just Begun"	Roger Nichols; Paul Williams	Previously unreleased	2:25
6.	"Since I Fell for You"	Buddy Johnson	Barbra Joan Streisand, 1971	3:25
7.	"You're the Top" (featuring Ryan O'Neal)	Cole Porter	What's Up, Doc?, 1972	4:08
8.	"What Are You Doing the Rest of Your Life?" (featuring Michel Legrand; demo)	Alan Bergman; Marilyn Bergman; Michel Legrand	Previously unreleased	3:36
9.	"If I Close My Eyes" (featuring Michel Legrand)	A. Bergman; M. Bergman; Billy Goldenberg	Up the Sandbox, 1972	2:24
10.	"Between Yesterday and Tomorrow"	A. Bergman; M. Bergman; M. Legrand	Previously unreleased	3:32
11.	"Can You Tell the Moment?"	A. Bergman; M. Bergman; M. Legrand	Previously unreleased	2:27
12.	"The Way We Were" (soundtrack version)	A. Bergman; M. Bergman; Marvin Hamlisch	The Way We Were, 1973	3:52
13.	"Cryin' Time" (featuring Ray Charles)	Buck Owens	Barbra Streisand...and Other Musical Instruments, 1973	2:18
14.	"God Bless the Child"	Billie Holiday; Arthur Herzog Jr.	Previously unreleased	3:32
15.	"A Quiet Thing / There Won't Be Trumpets"	Fred Ebb; John Kander; Stephen Sondheim	Previously unreleased	5:20
16.	"Lost Inside of You"	Barbra Streisand; Leon Russell	A Star Is Born, 1976	4:53
17.	"Evergreen" (soundtrack version; demo)	Streisand; Paul Williams	A Star Is Born	3:13
18.	"1977 Academy Awards" (live)		49th Academy Awards, 1977	1:22
19.	"Hatikvah" (featuring Golda Meir; live)	Naftali Herz Imber	The Stars Salute Israel at 30, 1978	4:59
Total length:				63:20

Disc four: "The 80's"
No.	Title	Writer(s)	Taken from	Length
1.	"You Don't Bring Me Flowers" (with Neil Diamond; live)	Alan Bergman; Marilyn Bergman; Neil Diamond	22nd Annual Grammy Awards, 1980	3:37
2.	"The Way We Weren't / The Way We Were" (live)	A. Bergman; M. Bergman; Marvin Hamlisch	ACLU Tribute to Alan and Marilyn Bergman, 1980	4:52
3.	"Guilty" (with Barry Gibb)	Barry Gibb; Robin Gibb; Maurice Gibb	Guilty, 1980	4:27
4.	"Papa, Can You Hear Me?" (demo)	A. Bergman; M. Bergman; Michel Legrand	Yentl, 1983	3:34
5.	"The Moon and I" (demo)	A. Bergman; M. Bergman; M. Legrand	Yentl	3:19
6.	"A Piece of Sky" (demo)	A. Bergman; M. Bergman; M. Legrand	Yentl	4:13
7.	"I Know Him So Well" (featuring Richard Page)	Benny Andersson; Tim Rice; Björn Ulvaeus	Previously unreleased	4:13
8.	"If I Loved You"	Oscar Hammerstein II; Richard Rodgers	The Broadway Album, 1985	2:38
9.	"Putting It Together"	Stephen Sondheim	The Broadway Album	4:19
10.	"Over the Rainbow" (live)	Harold Arlen; E.Y. "Yip" Harburg	One Voice, 1987	4:43
11.	"Theme"	Barbra Streisand	Nuts, 1987	3:43
12.	"Here We Are at Last"	Streisand; Richard Baskin	Emotion	3:20
13.	"Warm All Over"	Frank Loesser	Previously unreleased	2:48
14.	"You'll Never Know" (duet version)	Mack Gordon; Harry Warren	Previously unreleased	4:07
Total length:				53:53

Notes

- "Judy Garland Medley, No. 1" consists of the songs "Hooray for Love", "After You've Gone", "By Myself", "'S Wonderful", "How About You?", "Lover, Come Back to Me", "You and the Night and the Music" and "It All Depends on You"
- "Circus Medley" consists of the songs "(Have I Stayed) Too Long at the Fair" and "Look at That Face"
- "Las Vegas Medley" consists of the songs "When You Gotta Go" and "In the Wee Small Hours of the Morning"
- "The Singer" and "I Can Do It" recorded in 1970 during sessions for the unfinished album The Singer
- "We've Only Just Begun" recorded in 1971 during sessions for Barbra Joan Streisand
- "Can You Tell the Moment?" recorded in 1973 during sessions for the unfinished album Life Cycle of a Woman
- "God Bless the Child" recorded in 1974 during sessions for Butterfly

=== Highlights from Just for the Record ===
Standard edition
No.	Title	Length
1.	"You'll Never Know"	2:58
2.	"A Sleepin' Bee" (live)	4:50
3.	"Miss Marmelstein"	3:21
4.	"I Hate Music" (live)	1:11
5.	"Nobody's Heart (Belongs to Me)" (live)	2:11
6.	"Cry Me a River" (live)	3:53
7.	"Judy Garland Medley, No. 2" (with Judy Garland; live)	2:28
8.	"People"	3:40
9.	"Act II Medley" (featuring Diana Kind; live)	4:27
10.	"You Wanna Bet"	2:27
11.	"Come Rain or Come Shine" (featuring Harold Arlen; live)	2:48
12.	"Untitled" (featuring Don Rickles; live)	1:13
13.	"The Sweetest Sounds" (featuring Richard Rodgers; live)	2:01
14.	"You're the Top" (featuring Ryan O'Neal)	4:08
15.	"What Are You Doing the Rest of Your Life?" (featuring Michel Legrand; demo)	3:36
16.	"Cryin' Time" (featuring Ray Charles)	2:18
17.	"A Quiet Thing / There Won't Be Trumpets"	5:20
18.	"Evergreen" (soundtrack version; demo)	3:13
19.	"Between Yesterday and Tomorrow"	3:32
20.	"You Don't Bring Me Flowers" (with Neil Diamond; live)	3:37
21.	"Papa, Can You Hear Me?" (demo)	3:34
22.	"I Know Him So Well" (featuring Richard Page)	4:13
23.	"Warm All Over"	2:48
24.	"You'll Never Know" (duet version)	4:07
Total length:		77:54

Notes

- "Judy Garland Medley, No. 2" consists of the songs "Get Happy" and "Happy Days Are Here Again"
- "Act II Medley" consists of the songs "Second Hand Rose", "Give Me the Simple Life", "Any Place I Hang My Hat is Home", "Nobody Knows You When You're Down and Out", and "The Best Things in Life Are Free"
- "A Quiet Thing / There Won't Be Trumpets" recorded in 1974 during sessions for Butterfly
- "Between Yesterday and Tomorrow" recorded in 1973 during sessions for the unfinished album Life Cycle of a Woman
- "I Know Him So Well" recorded in 1985 during sessions for The Broadway Album
- "Warm All Over" and the duet version of "You'll Never Know" recorded during sessions for the 1988 version of Back to Broadway

== Personnel ==
Information is based on AllMusic and the album's liner notes

- Barbra Streisand – producer (also 3-16 to 3-17, 4-04 to 4-06, 4-08 to 4-09, 4-12), arranger, lead vocals, liner notes
- John Arrias – producer, recording engineer (also 4-10, 4-12)
- Richard Baskin – producer (4-10, 4-12)
- Alan Bergman – producer (4-04 to 4-06)
- Marilyn Bergman – producer (4-04 to 4-06)
- Michael Berniker – producer (1-06 to 1-13, 1-15 to 1-16, 2-03)
- Ralph Burns – musical adaptation, orchestration (2-01 to 2-02)
- Artie Butler – arranger, conductor (3-07)
- Don Costa – arranger (2-06 to 2-07, 2-11)
- Peter Daniels – arranger (1-02 to 1-03, 1-06 to 1-14)
- Frank Dookun – recording engineer
- Ray Ellis – arranger (2-14)
- Martin Erlichman – producer (also 3-13)
- David Foster – producer, arranger
- Ian Freebairn-Smith – arranger (3-16 to 3-17)
- Albhy Galuten – producer (4-03)
- Barry Gibb – producer (4-03)
- Jack Gold – producer (2-14 to 2-16)
- Wally Gold – producer (2-23, 3-01 to 3-02)
- Billy Goldenberg – producer, arranger (3-09)
- Marvin Hamlisch – arranger (3-12)
- Lennie Hayton – producer, arranger (2-22)
- Lee Holdridge – arranger (3-14 to 3-15, 4-12)
- Rupert Holmes – producer, arranger (4-13 to 4-14)
- Debbie Johnson – recording engineer
- Randy Kerber – arranger (4-10)
- Michel Legrand – associate producer (4-04 to 4-06), arranger, conductor (3-10 to 3-11, 4-04 to 4-06)
- Goddard Lieberson – producer (1-04)
- Alan Lindgren – arranger (4-01)
- Mort Lindsey – musical director (1-18 to 1-20, 2-12 to 2-13)
- Jeremy Lubbock – arranger (4-11)
- Peter Matz – producer (4-08 to 4-09), arranger (1-15 to 1-16, 2-04, 2-08 to 2-10, 3-01 to 3-02, 4-02, 4-08 to 4-09), orchestration (3-06), conductor (1-15 to 1-16, 2-04, 2-08 to 2-10, 3-01 to 3-02, 3-04, 4-02, 4-08 to 4-09)
- Zubin Mehta – conductor (3-19)
- Robert Mersey – producer (2-04, 2-06, 2-10 to 2-11)
- Gil Morales – assistant audio mixing
- Lionel Newman – producer, arranger (2-22)
- Gene Page – arranger (3-03, 3-06)
- Marty Paich – producer, arranger (3-12)
- Richard Perry – producer (3-03, 3-06)
- Jon Peters – producer (3-14 to 3-15)
- Scott Ralston – assistant audio mixing
- Sid Ramin – arranger (1-04 to 1-05)
- Phil Ramone – producer (3-16 to 3-17)
- Karl Richardson – producer (4-03)
- Nelson Riddle – arranger (2-23)
- Milton Rosenstock – conductor (2-01 to 2-02)
- Freddie Salem – guitars, producer (3-12)
- Walter Scharf – orchestration (2-15 to 2-16)
- Thomas Z. Shepard – producer (2-08 to 2-09)
- David Shire – arranger (2-10 to 2-13)
- Karen Swenson – project coordinator
- Mel Tormé – arranger (1-18 to 1-20)
- Ken Welch – arranger (1-05, 3-13), musical director (1-05)
- Mitzie Welch – arranger (3-13), musical director (1-05, 3-13)
- Pat Williams – arranger (3-16)

== Charts ==
Chart performance for Just for the Record...
Chart (1991–1992)	Peak position
Australian Albums (ARIA)	126
Dutch Albums (Album Top 100) Highlights from Just for the Record	72
US Billboard 200	38
US Cashbox Top 200 Pop Albums	31

== Certifications ==
Certifications for Just for the Record...
Region	Certification	Certified units/sales
United States (RIAA)	Platinum	454,000
