= What Matters Most (Barbra Streisand album) =

What Matters Most: Barbra Streisand Sings the Lyrics of Alan & Marilyn Bergman

Studio album by Barbra Streisand
- Released: August 23, 2011
- Recorded: 2010–11
- Studios: 20th Century Fox (Burbank, California); Sony Pictures (Culver City, California); Grandma's House (Malibu, California)
- Genre: Traditional pop
- Length: 41:34
- Label: Columbia
- Producer: Barbra Streisand

Barbra Streisand chronology
| The Ultimate Collection (2010) | What Matters Most: Barbra Streisand Sings the Lyrics of Alan & Marilyn Bergman (2011) | Release Me (2012) |

Professional ratings
Review scores
| Source | Rating |
|---|---|
| AllMusic | 3.5/5 stars |
| Entertainment Weekly | B+ |
| The New York Times | Favorable |

What Matters Most is the thirty-third studio album by American singer Barbra Streisand. Dedicated to the lyrics of her longtime friends Alan and Marilyn Bergman, and produced by Streisand herself, Columbia Records released the album on August 23, 2011. While no singles were released to promote the album, it debuted at number 4 on the Billboard 200 and received generally positive reviews from music critics.

Having recorded numerous Bergman songs during her career, Streisand planned What Matters Most as a chance to mine other gems from their extensive songbook. The deluxe edition includes a second disc containing the Bergman tunes that Streisand had previously recorded.

At the 54th Grammy Awards What Matters Most was nominated for Best Traditional Pop Vocal Album. In its first week the album sold 68,000 copies in the United States and 210,000 copies within a year. The album became her fourth studio album not to receive RIAA certification in the United States.

== A Happening at Starbucks ==
In promotion of the album, Streisand's February performance at the MusiCares Person of the Year benefit was made available to view on the Starbucks Digital Network between August 23 and 30, 2011.

== Track listing ==
All lyrics by Alan and Marilyn Bergman, except "That Face", lyrics by Alan Bergman and Lew Spence. Composers indicated.

| No. | Title | Writer(s) | Length |
|---|---|---|---|
| 1. | "The Windmills of Your Mind" | Michel Legrand | 3:54 |
| 2. | "Something New In My Life" | Michel Legrand | 4:02 |
| 3. | "Solitary Moon" | Johnny Mandel | 4:31 |
| 4. | "Nice 'n' Easy" | Lew Spence | 4:27 |
| 5. | "Alone In the World" | Jerry Goldsmith | 4:09 |
| 6. | "So Many Stars" | Sérgio Mendes | 4:29 |
| 7. | "The Same Hello, the Same Goodbye" | John Williams | 4:11 |
| 8. | "That Face" | Lew Spence | 4:31 |
| 9. | "I'll Never Say Goodbye" | David Shire | 4:08 |
| 10. | "What Matters Most" | Dave Grusin | 3:12 |
| Total length: | | | 41:34 |

Deluxe Edition Bonus Disc
| No. | Title | Writer(s) | Length |
|---|---|---|---|
| 1. | "The Way We Were" | Marvin Hamlisch | 3:30 |
| 2. | "What Are You Doing the Rest of Your Life?" | Michel Legrand | 3:19 |
| 3. | "You Don't Bring Me Flowers" (duet with Neil Diamond) | Neil Diamond | 3:24 |
| 4. | "Papa, Can You Hear Me?" | Michel Legrand | 3:29 |
| 5. | "Pieces of Dreams" | Michel Legrand | 3:26 |
| 6. | "The Island" | Ivan Lins, Vítor Martins | 4:35 |
| 7. | "The Summer Knows" | Michel Legrand | 3:40 |
| 8. | "How Do You Keep the Music Playing?" | Michel Legrand | 5:09 |
| 9. | "After the Rain" | Michel Legrand | 3:43 |
| 10. | "A Piece of Sky" | Michel Legrand | 4:20 |
| Total length: | | | 38:35 |

Starbucks Edition Bonus Tracks
| No. | Title | Writer(s) | Length |
|---|---|---|---|
| 11. | "The Way We Were" | Marvin Hamlisch | 3:30 |
| 12. | "You Don't Bring Me Flowers" (duet with Neil Diamond) | Neil Diamond | 3:24 |
| 13. | "What Are You Doing the Rest of Your Life?" | Michel Legrand | 3:19 |
| Total length: | | | 51:47 |

== Chart performance ==
=== Weekly charts ===
| Chart (2011) | Peak position |
|---|---|
| Australian Albums (ARIA) | 42 |
| Austrian Albums (Ö3 Austria) | 29 |
| Belgian Albums (Ultratop Flanders) | 60 |
| Belgian Albums (Ultratop Wallonia) | 54 |
| Canadian Albums (Billboard) | 11 |
| Dutch Albums (Album Top 100) | 19 |
| French Albums (SNEP) | 156 |
| German Albums (Offizielle Top 100) | 18 |
| Hungarian Albums Chart | 14 |
| Italian Albums (FIMI) | 37 |
| Norwegian Albums (VG-lista) | 30 |
| Polish Albums Chart | 24 |
| Scottish Albums (Official Charts) | 12 |
| Spanish Albums (Promusicae) | 18 |
| Swedish Albums (Sverigetopplistan) | 54 |
| Swiss Albums (Schweizer Hitparade) | 28 |
| UK Albums (Official Charts) | 7 |
| UK Album Downloads (Official Charts) | 36 |
| US Billboard 200 | 4 |

=== Year-end charts ===
| Chart (2011) | Position |
|---|---|
| Billboard Year-End | 186 |
