= Life Cycle of a Woman =

Unreleased album by Barbra Streisand

Recording Unreleased by Barbra Streisand
- Released: Unreleased
- Genre: Classical pop

Life Cycle of a Woman is the commonly used title for an unreleased album by Barbra Streisand. Having recorded three tracks for the project in 1973 (and one track many years later), the creators ultimately lost interest and moved onto other projects. In 2017, Natalie Dessay became interested in the project and finished the album. Many confuse the number of songs Streisand recorded for the project in 1973. Five songs were recorded during the 1973 session, but only three of them were for the Life Cycles project.

== Content ==
The piece has been referred to as a song cycle, an oratorio, and a musical drama. It tracks the life of a woman from birth to death, highlighting various stages including childhood, through first love, married life, and parenthood.

“Mother and Child” sees the performer duet from the perspective of both family members, as "lullaby and counterpoint".

== Development ==
=== Life Cycle of a Woman unfinished album (1973-7) ===
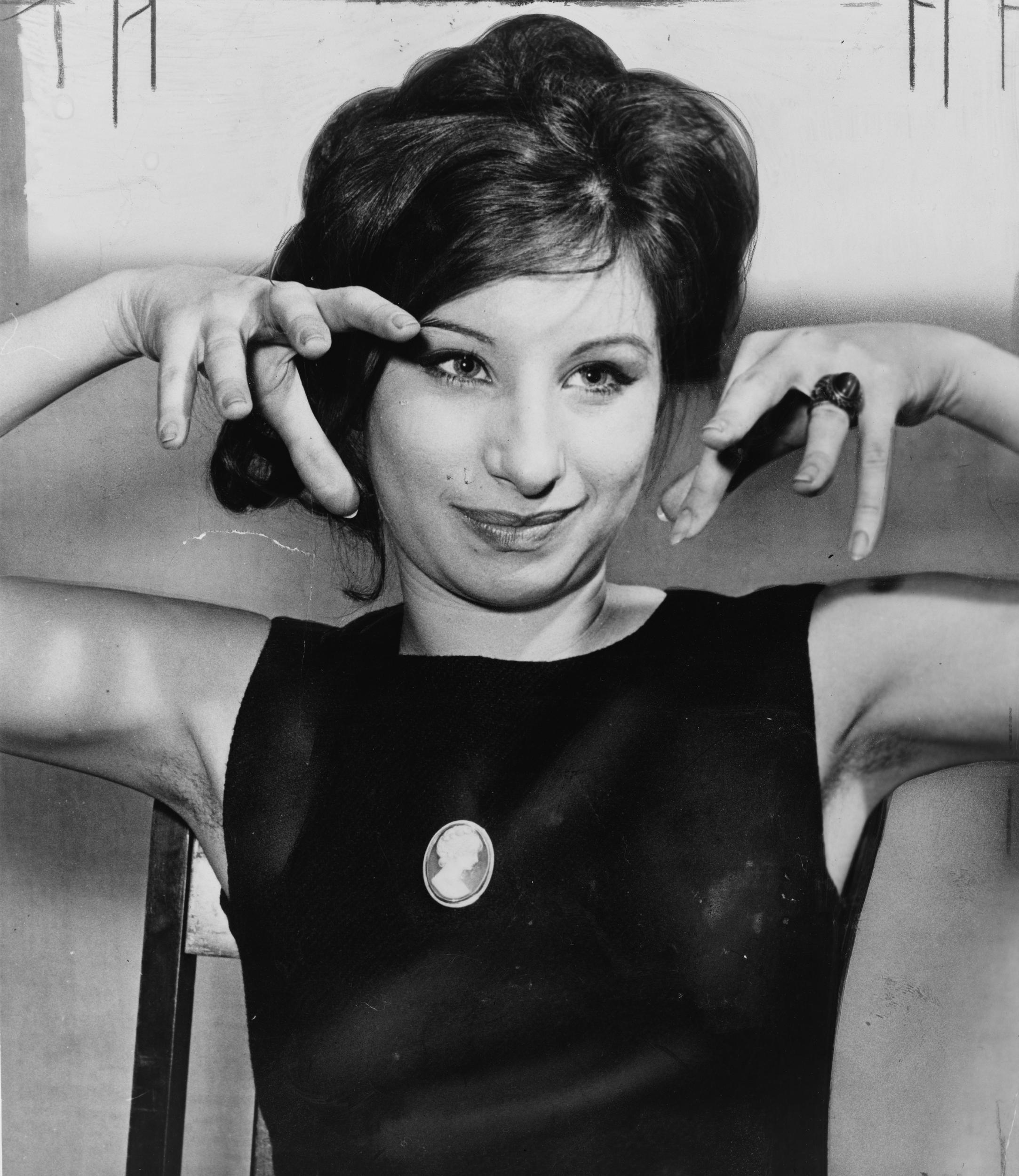
The concept album was original written for Barbra Streisand (pictured in 1962).

Michel Legrand, Alan and Marilyn Bergman composed the song cycle specifically for Streisand in 1973. Its songs would have traced the life of a woman from birth until death.

Legrand explained that they played the piece for Streisand and she was excited by it, but two weeks later she called and expressed that she could not sing the birth or death songs due to being too emotionally impactful, and requested he remove them; Legrand declined due to his belief that they were integral to the telling of the woman's life. Streisand felt that the composers had not fully developed their concept at that point, beyond a general "womb to tomb" idea. A technical issue arose when Streisand insisted she record the songs in the middle of an orchestra, which limited the sound engineers from mixing the pieces. After a while they all became involved in other projects, and lost interest in the album. Streisand ultimately recorded four songs in the project.

On April 13, 1975, The Cincinnati Enquirer reported a "top secret project at Columbia" being worked on by the composers, noting that at the time all that was known about the project was its title and that half of the album had been finished. Columbia executives locked the master tapes of the completed parts in a safe in a Manhattan bank. Legrand commented that "All of the songs are written. The Bergmans and I have been wanting to get results. I working on this project for five years. But Barbra, she's such a busy woman."

Streisand never completed the project, though she did record a few songs including "Between Yesterday and Tomorrow” and “Mother and Child”. While she expressed an initial interest, Playbill reported she was unwilling to commit to a full project. The Huffington Post noted that a common explanation is that the singer found it “too deep”. Streisand explained to The Times that she had a few issues including "the way the oratorio began and ended, and the way Legrand wanted to record it".

In a 1977 interview with The Long Island Newsday Magazine Streisand commented "I'm already not going to make it. Sounds too impressive. I must pick that up, though. I did one session with three songs and they're quite beautiful. I have more of them."

=== Intermediate period (1980s-2010s) ===
Various songs from the project have been released on Streisand albums over the decades, and some ideas were further explored in the singer's film Yentl.

Two songs from the piece - “Can You Tell the Moment?” and "Between Yesterday and Tomorrow" - were placed onto Streisand's 1991 box set Just for the Record.

“Wait” was recorded many years after the 1973 recording session and was the 4th song Streisand recorded from the project. It was released on her “A Love Like Ours” album.

“Mother and Child” would be released on Streisand's 2012 album Release Me. Prior to this the song had been passed around on the fan bootleg circuit for many years, often on "barely audible, wobbly cassettes", so this was the first release of the song in "pristine shape".

Streisand would continue to interpret Legrand's songs throughout her career including “What Are You Doing the Rest of Your Life?,” “The Summer Knows,” and "The Windmills of Your Mind". She collaborated with the French composer on the soundtrack to Yentl.

=== Between Yesterday and Tomorrow album (2017) ===
In 2017, operatic coloratura soprano Natalie Dessay completed the project and digitally released it through Sony Classical on November 17 under the title Between Yesterday and Tomorrow: The Extraordinary Life of an Ordinary Woman. Meanwhile, a hard-copy CD was scheduled for release January 5, 2018. News about the project was first broken by The New York Times. Having frequently collaborated, Dessay had met up with Legrand for a new project to work on; the composer played her some melodies from the abandoned project and the singer became emotionally overwhelmed, exclaiming "that's exactly what I want to do...give it to me". The album consisted of 15 songs and 5 instrumental pieces. Dessay was grateful that Streisand never completed the album, as she was able to be the catalyst for the project's ultimate release.

== Critical reception ==
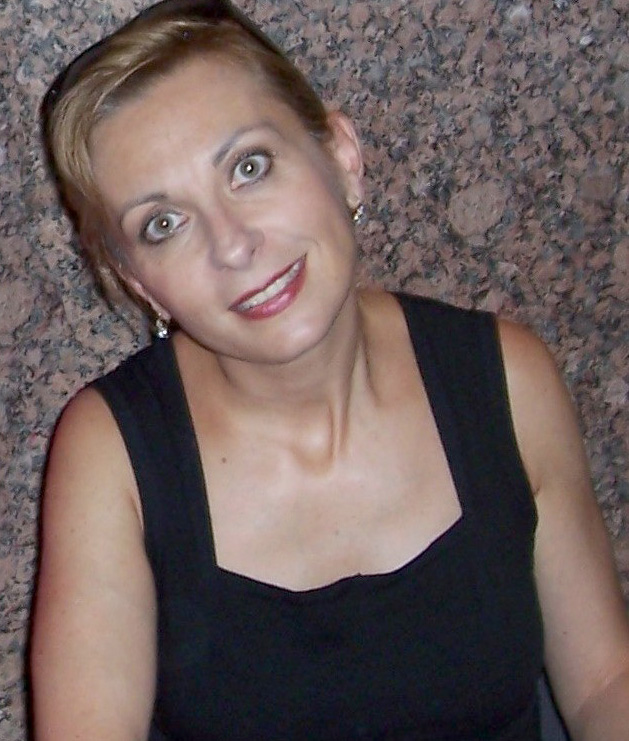
Natalie Dessay (pictured in 2008) resurrected the project in 2017.

Noting that the project was being worked on by a "sensational musical team", The Cincinnati Enquirer anticipated the project would deliver Streisand a new best selling album and be of better quality that Butterfly.

The Huffington Post deemed Mother and Child a "moving piece", noting that even in the poor quality of bootleg version, "the tender and compelling nature...was apparent". Opera News thought that Dessay brought her "smooth croon, her near-flawless English diction and her interpretive insights" to the piece.

The New York Times felt the album Between Yesterday and Tomorrow "abounds with delicious touches that reward close listening", noting that Dessay exhales during the birth song and inhales in the death song, creating a continuous loop.
