= The Way We Were (Barbra Streisand album) =

Studio album by Barbra Streisand
- Released: January 30, 1974
- Recorded: 1969–1973
- Studio: United Western (Hollywood)
- Genre: Contemporary pop
- Length: 35:13
- Label: Columbia
- Producers: Wally Gold; Tommy LiPuma; Marty Paich

Barbra Streisand chronology
Barbra Streisand...and Other Musical Instruments (1973)	The Way We Were (1974)	The Way We Were: Original Soundtrack Recording (1974)

Singles from The Way We Were
- 1. "The Way We Were" Released: September 27, 1973; 2. "All in Love Is Fair" Released: March 1974

The Way We Were is the fifteenth studio album recorded by American singer Barbra Streisand. The album was released in January 1974, preceded by the commercial success of its lead single "The Way We Were" first released in September 1973.

Three additional songs were newly recorded for the album, while six of the tracks salvaged unreleased material from previous Streisand projects. Following the distribution of a soundtrack album for the eponymous 1973 film, Columbia added a caption to Streisand's LP (Featuring the Hit Single The Way We Were and All in Love Is Fair) in order to minimize confusion between the two albums.

Covering a wide array of themes, Streisand sings about recovering relationships, social awareness, and love in general: a contemporary pop album blended with her signature vocal style. Streisand's production team included Tommy LiPuma and Wally Gold, while Marty Paich contributed to the title track.

The lead single topped the charts in both Canada and the United States, where it became the top-selling single of 1974. The second single "All in Love Is Fair" was released in March 1974 and also charted in the two countries.

The album received generally favorable reviews from music critics, who praised Streisand's vocals and found the record capable of being extremely successful. Commercially, The Way We Were topped the Billboard 200 in the United States and reached the top ten on album charts in Australia and Canada. It also entered the charts in Japan and the United Kingdom. The album has since been certified 2× Platinum in the United States by the RIAA.

== Background and release ==
The concept for the record first developed in late 1973, following the success of "The Way We Were", which was written specifically for the 1973 film of the same title starring Streisand and Robert Redford. American composer and producer Marvin Hamlisch was commissioned to write the melody for the track, which he found to be hugely challenging due to Streisand's demands. She had wanted him to produce the composition in minor key, but he instead wrote it in major key due to his fear that the song's lyrics would be revealed too quickly to the listener. According to the liner notes of her 1991 greatest hits album Just for the Record, "The Way We Were", "All in Love is Fair", "Being at War with Each Other", and "Something So Right" were the only tracks specifically recorded and created for the album. The majority of the project's material consisted of demos and recordings from Streisand's recording sessions with Alan Bergman and Marilyn Bergman for an unreleased album titled The Singer. Both "The Best Thing You've Ever Done" and "Summer Me, Winter Me" were previously released together as a non-album single by Streisand in April 1970, and were originally intended for inclusion on the official soundtrack to her 1970 film The Owl and the Pussycat.

Recording sessions for the album took place at United-Western Recorders in Los Angeles between September 1969 and December 1973, while the mixing was performed at Hollywood Sound during that same time period. "What Are You Doing the Rest of Your Life?" and "My Buddy"/"How About Me" were the first two songs recorded, while "Being at War with Each Other", "Something So Right", and "All in Love Is Fair" were the final three to be completed. Al Schmitt handled the engineering and mixing aspects for the finished tracks, while Doug Sax mastered the pieces at The Mastering Lab, also in Los Angeles. Streisand and Columbia Records released The Way We Were on January 1, 1974, as her fifteenth studio album overall, and first since 1973's Barbra Streisand…and Other Musical Instruments. However, Columbia switched the title of the album at the last minute to Featuring the Hit Single The Way We Were and All in Love Is Fair in order to distinguish Streisand's record from the 1974 soundtrack of the same title with the same release date. The same label issued this version as an 8-track cartridge in 1974, with a differing track listing: both "Something So Right" and "Summer Me, Winter Me" are broken into two separate parts increasing the number of tracks on the record from ten to twelve. The album was later released in CD and digital formats on February 5, 2008.

== Music and lyrics ==
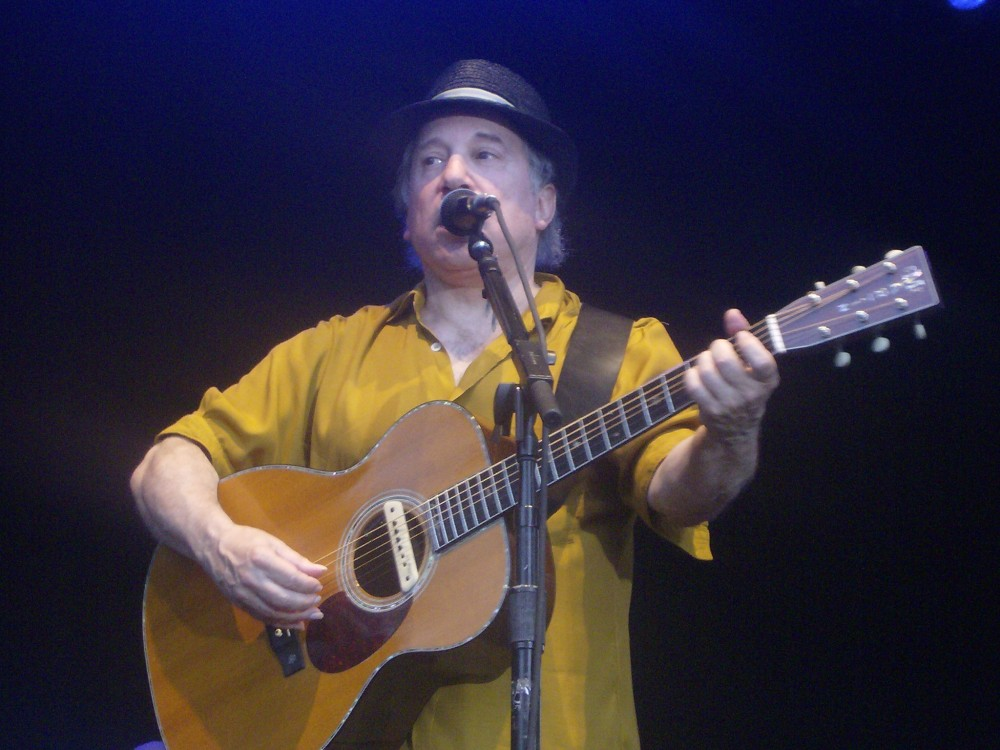
Streisand recorded Paul Simon's "Something So Right" for The Way We Were.

As a whole, the record is a contemporary pop piece, incorporating elements from Streisand's signature musical style. Carole King penned opening track "Being at War with Each Other", though first released on her 1973 album Fantasy, King wrote the song specifically for Streisand. Produced by LiPuma, she sings about various topics, ranging from socialization and relationships. She also claims that all humans stem from "one father" and "one mother" and how differing opinions only "complicate our lives". "Something So Right" is also a cover and originally the B-side track to Paul Simon's 1973 single "Take Me to the Mardi Gras". It focuses heavily on the songwriting rather than the production, although the composition was the second included to be produced by LiPuma. "The Best Thing You've Ever Done" was originally written in 1970 by Charnin who maintained interest in creating a composition for Streisand. Additionally, Wally Gold handled the production for the track, the first of six on the album. Lead single "The Way We Were" is the album's fourth track. In particular, its lyrics detail the personal life of Katie Morosky, the character Streisand portrays in the previously mentioned film, and her troubling relationship with boyfriend Hubbell Gardiner. Track five, "All in Love Is Fair", is a Stevie Wonder cover but is fronted by Streisand's own personal take on it. She sings about a failing relationship through the use of clichés and obvious messages regarding love.

"What Are You Doing the Rest of Your Life?" was written by French composer Michel Legrand (who would continue writing songs with Streisand for years) and Alan and Marilyn Bergman. Gold also produced it, while Peter Matz arranged the instruments and orchestration that accompanied the composition. Seventh and eighth tracks "Summer Me, Winter Me" and "Pieces of Dreams", respectively, also feature contributions from Legrand, with the former originally created specifically for The Singer and the latter a cover of the 1970 version for the film Pieces of Dreams. "I've Never Been a Woman Before" is song written by Tom Baird and Ron Miller for Cherry, an unproduced musical based on the William Inge play Bus Stop. The closing song on the record is a medley of "My Buddy" and "How About Me", from Gus Kahn, Walter Donaldson, and Irving Berlin. The first part of the melody details someone affected by the loss of a friend, particularly a soldier who died during combat, as noted by author Robert Eberwein in his 2007 book Armed Forces; Masculinity and Sexuality in the American War Film.

== Singles ==
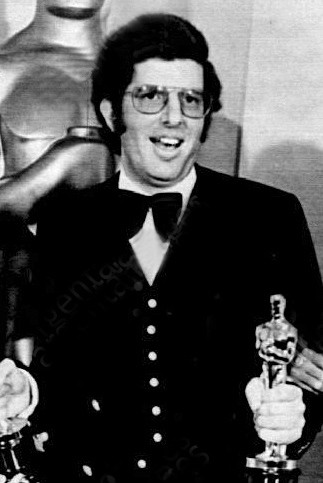
Hamlisch was awarded two Academy Awards for his credited work on "The Way We Were".

The album's lead single "The Way We Were" was released as a 7" record on September 27, 1973, roughly three weeks before the premiere of the accompanying film. The song was largely successful after its initial release, where it reached number one on the Billboard Hot 100 and spent twenty-three consecutive weeks among the ranking. Its success was replicated in Canada, where it was also number one. "The Way We Were" was additionally the top-selling single in the United States in 1974 according to the list compiled by Billboard. It was also sent to adult contemporary radio, where it topped the Adult Contemporary charts in both the United States and Canada. On August 19, 1997, "The Way We Were" was certified platinum by the Recording Industry Association of America, signifying sales of over 1,000,000 copies. The single has since been considered to be one of her signature songs. For their work on the track, Hamlisch and the Bergman's won the Academy Award for Best Original Song at the 46th Academy Awards, with Hamlisch also winning the Academy Award for Best Original Score for his work on the film. It additionally won the Golden Globe Award for Best Original Song in 1974 and the Grammy Award for Song of the Year in 1975. On the National Endowment for the Arts and Recording Industry Association of America's list of the top 365 "Songs of the Century", "The Way We Were" was placed at number 298.

"All in Love Is Fair" was released as the album's second single in March 1974, a cover of the Stevie Wonder original for his 1973 album, Innervisions. Columbia also released it as a 7" single paired alongside the medley of "My Buddy" and "How About Me". Matthew Greenwald from AllMusic was so fond of her rendition that he wrote: "It is no doubt one of the most graceful and memorable hooks from the era, and Streisand's performance – particularly her phrasing of this line – is unforgettable". It failed to replicate the success of "The Way We Were", but it managed to peak at numbers 63 and 60 in the United States and Canada, respectively. It additionally reached the top ten of the Adult Contemporary chart, also compiled by Billboard.

In 1972, Streisand's version of "What Are You Doing the Rest of Your Life?" was released as a promotional single in the United States in the 7" vinyl format. It was paired alongside "The Best Thing You've Ever Done", which is also included on The Way We Were.

== Critical reception ==
Professional ratings
Review scores
Source	Rating
AllMusic	3/5 stars
Christgau's Record Guide	B−

The Way We Were has received generally favorable reviews from music critics. Robert Christgau enjoyed the overall sound of the album, noting that the catchiness of roughly half the album allows for the songs to be replayed over and over. The editors at Billboard were appreciative of the release, and singled out The Way We Were in its "Spotlight" section for the February 9, 1974 issue. The publication highlighted album tracks "Being at War with Each Other" and "All in Love Is Fair" and declared: "This is the way Streisand should sound." Bob Talbert of the Detroit Free Press remarked upon its release, "thank you, Barbra, for coming back to where you belong. It's no wonder this is the best-selling album and tape in the middle-of-the-road world at this moment. The last few times Streisand has come out of the chutes it's been as an imitation-cum-parody of herself. Or it was a commercial spin-off from her last and mediocre TV special. This is a listener. Sit back, prop up, sip away, turn on, do whatever it is you do, and enjoy. She picks—and you can rest assured she picks 'em—unique song again. Stevie Wonder's 'All in Love Is Fair', not a major Wonder work, is one now after Streisand's treatment. Or Carole King's 'Being at War with Each Other' and Paul Simon's 'Something So Right.' Dynamite. This is quality Streisand. The way she was and should always be."

Stephen Holden from Rolling Stone labeled it "her best album in years"; he also found that her voice sounds just "as fresh as it did in the sixties". Jon Landau, also from Rolling Stone, was disappointed by the singer's effort, writing that she "no longer sings songs", but rather "acts them out". He referenced her catalogue and stated: "I've enjoyed Barbra Streisand's music in the past, but of the 20 albums I listened to to write this column, The Way We Were was not only the most disappointing, but the most difficult to get all the way through."

AllMusic's William Ruhlmann awarded the album three out of five stars but found it obvious that the record was "thrown together" instead of being orchestrated and thought out carefully. He also declared that the success of the title track "propelled th[e] album to the top of the charts".

== Commercial performance ==
In the United States, the album debuted at number 97 on the Billboard 200 chart for the week ending February 16, 1974, and by February 26, had already sold 500,000 copies and was certified Gold. The following week it rose to number 39, and on March 16 of the same year, it reached the top position. It became Streisand's second number one and seventh top five album, with the other number-one being People (1964). The Way We Were spent two weeks at the highest position before falling to number four on March 30. It continued dropping on the charts but managed to stay within the top 10 of the list for a total of six weeks. The Recording Industry Association of America changed its certification status to Platinum for shipments upwards of 1,000,000 sales, and again on September 23, 1998, The Way We Were was certified for selling over 2,000,000 copies. In the United Kingdom, it peaked at number 49 in May 1974, and was certified Silver for shifting 60,000 physical copies.

On Canada's Top Albums/CDs chart conducted by RPM, the record debuted at number 76 during the week of February 23, 1974. The Way We Were peaked at number three on March 30 and spent another week at that same position on April 6. It dropped to number nine the succeeding week and spent a total of twenty-three weeks in that country, with its final position being number 91 during the week of August 3. Music Canada reported in 1978 that the record had sold over 100,000 copies in their country, prompting it to become certified Platinum. In Australia and Japan, The Way We Were peaked at positions 7 and 73, respectively. It was later certified gold in the former country after selling approximately 35,000 copies.

== Track listing ==
The Way We Were – Standard edition
No.	Title	Writer(s)	Producer(s)	Length
1.	"Being at War with Each Other"	Carole King	Tommy LiPuma	4:02
2.	"Something So Right"	Paul Simon	LiPuma	4:26
3.	"The Best Thing You've Ever Done"	Martin Charnin	Wally Gold	2:49
4.	"The Way We Were"	Alan Bergman; Marilyn Bergman; Marvin Hamlisch	Marty Paich	3:31
5.	"All in Love Is Fair"	Stevie Wonder	LiPuma	3:50
6.	"What Are You Doing the Rest of Your Life?"	A. Bergman; M. Bergman; Michel Legrand	Gold	3:20
7.	"Summer Me, Winter Me"	A. Bergman; Legrand	Gold	2:55
8.	"Pieces of Dreams"	A. Bergman; M. Bergman; Legrand	Gold	3:27
9.	"I've Never Been a Woman Before"	Tom Baird; Ron Miller	Gold	2:45
10.	"My Buddy / How About Me"	Gus Kahn; Walter Donaldson; Irving Berlin	Gold	4:08
Total length:				35:13

Featuring the Hit Single The Way We Were and All in Love Is Fair – 8-track cartridge edition
No.	Title	Length
1.	"Being at War with Each Other"	4:02
2.	"The Best Thing You've Ever Done"	2:49
3.	"Something So Right" (Part 1)	2:44
4.	"Something So Right" (Conclusion)	1:45
5.	"The Way We Were"	3:31
6.	"I've Never Been a Woman Before"	2:45
7.	"All in Love Is Fair"	3:50
8.	"What Are You Doing the Rest of Your Life?"	3:20
9.	"Summer Me, Winter Me" (Part 1)	1:53
10.	"Summer Me, Winter Me" (Conclusion)	1:07
11.	"Pieces of Dreams"	3:27
12.	"My Buddy / How About Me"	4:08
Total length:		35:21

== Personnel ==
Credits adapted from the liner notes of the CD edition of The Way We Were.

- Barbra Streisand – vocals
- David Bailey – back cover photography
- Nick DeCaro – arranging (tracks 1, 2, 5)
- Wally Gold – production (tracks 3, 6–10)
- Tommy LiPuma – executive production, remixing
- Stephen Marcussen – remastering (CD and digital formats only)
- Peter Matz – arranging (tracks 6, 10)
- Claus Ogerman – arranging (tracks 8, 9)
- Marty Paich – production, arranging (track 4)
- Doug Sax – original mastering
- Steve Schapiro – cover photography
- Al Schmitt – engineering, mixing
- Stewart Whitmore – digital editing (CD and digital formats only)
- Frank DeCaro – music contractor

== Charts ==
=== Weekly charts ===
Weekly chart performance for The Way We Were
Chart (1974)	Peak position
Australia Albums (Go-Set)	7
Australia Albums (Kent Music Report)	10
Canada Top Albums/CDs (RPM)	3
Japanese Albums (Oricon)	73
UK Albums (Official Charts)	49
US Billboard 200	1

=== Year-end charts ===
Year-end chart performance for The Way We Were
Chart (1974)	Position
Canada Top Albums/CDs (RPM)	18
US Billboard 200	50
US Cash Box	42

== Certifications and sales ==
Certifications for The Way We Were
Region	Certification	Certified units/sales
Australia (ARIA)	Gold	35,000^{^}
Canada (Music Canada)	Platinum	100,000^{^}
Japan	—	4,000
United Kingdom (BPI)	Silver	60,000^{^}
United States (RIAA)	2× Platinum	2,000,000^{^}
^{^} Shipments figures based on certification alone.
