= Kon-Tiki (1950 film) =

- Danish theatrical poster
- Directed by: Thor Heyerdahl
- Written by: Thor Heyerdahl
- Produced by: Olle Nordemar
- Starring: Thor Heyerdahl
- Production company: Artfilm
- Distributed by: Sandrew
- Release dates: 13 January 1950 (Sweden); 13 February 1950 (Norway)
- Running time: 77 minutes
- Countries: Norway, Sweden
- Language: Norwegian

Kon-Tiki is a Norwegian documentary film about the Kon-Tiki expedition led by Norwegian explorer and writer Thor Heyerdahl in 1947, released in Sweden, Norway, Finland, and Denmark in 1950, followed by the United States in 1951. The movie, which was directed by Thor Heyerdahl and edited by Olle Nordemar, received the Academy Award for Best Documentary Feature for 1951 at the 24th Academy Awards. The Oscar officially went to Olle Nordemar.

The Academy Film Archive preserved Kon-Tiki in 2013.

== Content ==
The movie has an introduction explaining Heyerdahl's theory, then shows diagrams and images explaining the building of the raft and its launch from Peru. Thereafter it is a film of the crew on board, shot by themselves, with commentary written by Heyerdahl and translated. The whole film is black and white, shot on a single 16mm camera.

A small amount of color footage of Kon-Tiki does exist.

== See also ==
- Kon-Tiki (2012 film)
- List of Academy Award trophies on public display
