= The Stars Salute Israel at 30 =

- Directed by: Marty Pasetta
- Starring: Various artists
- Country of origin: United States
- Original language: English

Production
- Executive producer: James Lipton
- Production locations: Dorothy Chandler Pavilion, Hollywood, California
- Camera setup: Multiple

Original release
- Network: ABC
- Release: May 7, 1978

The Stars Salute Israel at 30 was a 1978 American television special broadcast on ABC. The program was a musical television special held to celebrate the 30th anniversary of the Israeli Declaration of Independence in 1948. It was viewed by an audience of 18.7 million.

It was held at the Dorothy Chandler Pavilion of the Los Angeles Music Center. It was simultaneously broadcast to an audience at the Grand Ballroom of the Jerusalem Hilton Hotel. The show was the only time that a foreign nation has been celebrated on American network television at prime time.

== Production ==
The Israeli embassy approached the jazz record producer Charles Fishman in anticipation of the anniversary. Fishman had previously brought the jazz saxophonist Stan Getz to Israel in 1977. Fishman recalled that he thought "What would be the hippest thing to do? What would be the biggest star-power thing to do?" and so sought to enlist Barbra Streisand for the special who had had extraordinary success the previous year with her film A Star Is Born and the song "Evergreen". Fishman got the producer James Lipton and the director Marty Pasetta to approach Streisand, who agreed to appear as long as she was accompanied by Zubin Mehta and the Los Angeles Philharmonic. The show was greenlit for broadcasting after Streisand's commitment by the ABC President Leonard Goldenson. He had been a long-standing supporter and advocate of Israel. The eventual show was directed by Pasetta and written by Lipton, Buz Kohan and Bob Arnot. Kohan had previously written The Stars Salute Israel - 25 for Israel's 25th anniversary in 1973. Kohan and Mehta helped Streisand prepare for the show and Kohan got his wife to sing the lyrics of the Israeli national anthem "Hatikvah" over the telephone to Streisand. It was held on 7 May 1978 and broadcast the following evening on ABC.

The celebration was sponsored by the American Committee to Celebrate Israel's 30th Anniversary.

== Content ==
Performers included Anne Bancroft, Daniel Barenboim, Mikhail Baryshnikov, Debby Boone, Pat Boone, George Burns, Carol Burnett, Sammy Davis Jr., Kirk Douglas, Marvin Hamlisch, Kate Jackson, Gabe Kaplan, Gene Kelly, Alan King, Billie Jean King, Gelsey Kirkland, Barry Manilow, Paul Newman, Bernadette Peters, Flip Wilson and others. Sally Struthers sang "Happy Birthday Israel" accompanied by a group of children. She was followed by a short speech by the Vice President of the United States, Walter Mondale. Manilow performed "It's a Miracle". A comic skit featured Henry Winkler and Henry Fonda. Peters performed "Thank You for Being a Friend". Davis and Boone sang "This Land Is Mine". The ballerinas Galina and Valery Panov danced to the music of Star Wars by John Williams. The show concluded with Barbra Streisand accompanied by Zubin Mehta and the Los Angeles Philharmonic. Streisand performed "Tomorrow", "People" and "Happy Days Are Here Again". She then had a conversation via video link with the former Israeli Prime Minister Golda Meir. Streisand jokingly told Meir " ... what an honor it is to talk to you and if someone else should call you while we're talking, it's all right, you can put me on hold, I wouldn't mind" and asked her "How did you manage all these years to have so much energy? Did you take vitamins?". Streisand tried joking with Prime Minister Golda Meir and attempted her NY Jewish accent, but Meir did not appear to be amused. Following their conversation Streisand performed the Israeli national anthem "Hatikvah". The audio of their conversation was subsequently released on Streisand's 1991 box set compilation album Just for the Record.... The audience did not applaud after the national anthem out of respect.
