= The Singer (song) =

- A-side label of US vinyl single

Single by Liza Minnelli

from the album The Singer
- B-side: "Mr. Emery Won't Be Home"
- Released: 1972
- Length: 2:31
- Label: Columbia
- Composer: Walter Marks

Liza Minnelli singles chronology
"Ring Them Bells" (1972)	"The Singer" (1972)	"Don't Let Me Be Lonely Tonight" (1973)

"The Singer" is a song recorded by American singer Liza Minnelli for her 1973 studio album of the same name. Written by Walter Marks, the song was originally conceived for an abandoned project by Barbra Streisand before being offered to Minnelli when she signed with Columbia Records in 1972. Released as the album's lead single by Columbia Records in late 1972, it was issued with "Mr. Emery Won’t Be Home" as its B-side.

The song received positive critical response. Commercially, it entered the RPM Adult Contemporary chart in Canada in January 1973, peaking at number 42 after several weeks.

== Overview ==
The song, written by Walter Marks and arranged by Peter Matz, was originally recorded by Barbra Streisand for a canceled album inspired by the politically satirical theater of Kurt Weill and Bertolt Brecht. Streisand had admired their works since watching The Seven Deadly Sins at sixteen, a "sung ballet" directed and choreographed by George Balanchine. "The Singer" aimed to capture the dark, expressive tone of German Expressionism, but Columbia Records president Clive Davis considered it too cautious and asked her to focus on more contemporary material instead. The song was inspired by the French singer Edith Piaf, According to Anni Edwards, author of Streisand: A Biography, the song is very "Gallic" and the lyrics suited for cabaret. Barbra Streisand later released her version on her 1991 album, Just for the Record....

"The Singer" was later offered to Minnelli when she signed with Columbia in 1972, following the success of Cabaret and Liza with a Z. The label aimed to capture her popularity and youthful image through contemporary material. The song was arranged by Al Capps and released by Columbia Records as the album's lead single, with "Mr. Emery Won't Be Home" as its B-side, in 1972.

== Critics and analysis ==
According to biographer Mark Wimer, the track, included in the album of the same name stands out as one of Minnelli's finest performances. He considered that the song's introspective lyrics, which describe a performer reflecting on her art and identity, sound like they could come from a Kander and Ebb musical.Wimer described Minnelli's rendition as both haunting and captivating, transforming what might appear as a simple reflection into a moving contemplation of fame and performance. Critic William Ruhlmann of AllMusic similarly praised the composition, suggesting that Marks' writing highlighted Minnelli's theatrical expressiveness and musical storytelling.

== Chart performance ==
The single entered the RPM Adult Contemporary chart in Canada on January 20, 1973, debuting at number 77. On February 24, 1973, the song peaked at number 42, in its final week on the chart.

== Track listing ==
"The Singer" — Side A
No.	Title	Writer(s)	Length
1.	"The Singer"	Walter Marks	2:31

"The Singer" — Side B
No.	Title	Writer(s)	Length
2.	"Mr. Emery Won't Be Home"	Bob Stone	2:48

== Personnel ==
Credits adapted from The Singer 7", 45 RPM, Single.

- Arranged by Al Capps
- Produced by Snuff Garret for Garret Music Enterprises

== Charts ==
Chart (1973)	Peak position
Canada Adult Contemporary (RPM)	42
