= The Sting (soundtrack) =

Soundtrack album by Marvin Hamlisch
- Released: 1974
- Recorded: 1973
- Genres: Jazz; ragtime
- Length: 36:59
- Label: MCA
- Producers: Marvin Hamlisch (producer); Gil Rodin (executive producer)

Marvin Hamlisch chronology
The Way We Were: Original Soundtrack Recording (1974)	The Sting (1974)	The Spy Who Loved Me (1977)

Professional ratings
Review scores
Source	Rating
AllMusic	4/5 stars

The original soundtrack to the 1973 Universal picture The Sting was released by MCA Records in 1974. The album spent several weeks at number one on Billboard's Top LPs & Tape chart.

== Track listing ==
LP (MCA-390)

Side 1
No.	Title	Writer(s)	Length
1.	"Solace" (orchestra version)	Scott Joplin	3:35
2.	"The Entertainer" (orchestra version)	Scott Joplin	3:03
3.	"Easy Winners"	Scott Joplin	2:44
4.	"Hooker's Hooker"	Marvin Hamlisch	2:48
5.	"Luther"	Marvin Hamlisch	3:08
6.	"a)" "Pineapple Rag" "b)" "Gladiolus Rag"	Scott Joplin	2:32

Side 2
No.	Title	Writer(s)	Length
1.	"The Entertainer" (piano version)	Scott Joplin	2:32
2.	"The Glove"	Marvin Hamlisch	1:46
3.	"Little Girl" (violin solo featuring Bobby Bruce)	Madeline Hyde—Francis Henry	2:00
4.	"Pineapple Rag"	Scott Joplin	2:35
5.	"Merry-Go-Round Music" (P. D.) a) "Listen to the Mocking Bird" b) "Darling Nellie Grey" c) "Turkey in the Straw"		2:44
6.	"Solace" (piano version)	Scott Joplin	3:35
7.	"a)" "The Entertainer" "b)" "Ragtime Dance"	Scott Joplin	3:45

== Charts ==
=== Weekly charts ===
Chart (1974)	Peak position
Australian Albums (Kent Music Report)	1
Canada Top Albums/CDs (RPM)	1
Dutch Albums (Album Top 100)	11
German Albums (Offizielle Top 100)	39
Norwegian Albums (VG-lista)	3
UK Albums (Official Charts)	7
US Billboard Top LPs & Tape	1
US Cashbox Top 100	1

=== Year-end charts ===
Chart (1974)	Position
Canada Top Albums/CDs (RPM)	2
UK Albums (OCC)	23
US Billboard 200	9
US Cashbox Top 100	7

== Certifications ==
Region	Certification	Certified units/sales
United Kingdom (BPI)	Gold	100,000^{^}
United States (RIAA)	Gold	500,000^{^}
^{^} Shipments figures based on certification alone.
