= If I Close My Eyes =

Single by Barbra Streisand
- B-side: "If I Close My Eyes" (Mono); "If I Close My Eyes" (Instrumental)
- Released: January 1973
- Recorded: December 14, 1972
- Studio: TTG Studios (North Hollywood, CA)
- Length: 2:23
- Label: Columbia
- Songwriter(s): Alan Bergman; Marilyn Bergman; Billy Goldenberg
- Producer(s): Billy Goldenberg

Barbra Streisand singles chronology
"Didn't We" (1972)	"If I Close My Eyes" (1973)	"The Way We Were" (1973)

"If I Close My Eyes" (also called "Theme from Up the Sandbox") is a song recorded by American vocalist Barbra Streisand for the 1972 American film Up the Sandbox. It was distributed for radio airplay in January 1973 through Columbia Records, while in later years it was made available as a 7" single. The single was written and produced by Billy Goldenberg, with Alan Bergman and Marilyn Bergman also contributing to the lyrics. Streisand requested Goldenberg to take the film's score and create a song out of it. During a late night phone conversation, he developed a melody and then the song was created.

The singer has never performed "If I Close My Eyes" and it remained absent from any of her compilation albums until 1991, when she included it on her first box set titled Just for the Record.... Michel Legrand, a longtime collaborator for Streisand, serves as a featured artist on this version.

== Background and release ==
"If I Close My Eyes", or "Theme from Up the Sandbox", was written and composed specifically for the 1972 American film Up the Sandbox, in which Streisand stars as the main character. It was recorded during a session in mid 1972, one of Streisand's first sessions for music since the work created for her most recent studio album at the time, Barbra Joan Streisand (1971). Since the singer's role in the film was very demanding, she had little time to record any music. During an interview with Time in 1975, one of the editor's stated that Streisand called Billy Goldenberg and requested he turn the film's final music sequence into a standalone song, to which he completed. Goldenberg recalled that he "wrote like mad" to get the job done on time: "When she called I hummed her the tune. She liked it, and the next day we got the word writers Marilyn and Alan Bergman to fit it out with a lyric." The editor concluded by claiming that the single was released a few weeks later.

The single was written and produced by Goldenberg, with Alan Bergman and Marilyn Bergman also contributing to the lyrics. It was released to United States radio stations in January 1973, strictly as a non-commercial release. However, in later years a 7" single was available for purchase from Streisand's catalog. The distribution took place in two different formats: the earlier promotional edition version features the "Vocal Version" plus the instrumental, while the standard release includes the "Stereo" and "Mono" renditions. Anne Edwards, an author who compiled a biography displaying Streisand's discography in 2016, wrote that "If I Close My Eyes" may have been released in December 1972, coinciding with the North American release of Up the Sandbox.

== Promotion ==
The physical release of "If I Close My Eyes" was very limited and only a set number of singles were created. Furthermore, Streisand excluded it from nearly all of her greatest hits albums. However, it was featured on disc three of Streisand's fifth compilation album and first box set, Just for the Record... in 1991. The version that appears on the record is slightly different compared to the 1973 recording, with the more recent release featuring additional contributions from French musician and personal friend Michel Legrand.

== Track listings and formats ==
Standard edition 7" single

- A1 "If I Close My Eyes (Stereo)" – 2:23
- B1 "If I Close My Eyes (Mono)" – 2:23

Promotional edition 7" single

- A1 "If I Close My Eyes (Vocal Version)" – 2:23
- B1 "If I Close My Eyes (Instrumental Version)" – 2:23

== Release history ==
Region	Date	Format	Label
United States	January 1973	Airplay	Columbia
United States	Unknown	7"	Columbia
