= How About Me? =

1928 song by Irving Berlin

"How About Me?" is a popular song written by Irving Berlin in 1928. The song is an expression of sorrow over a love affair that is over. The first recording by Fred Waring's Pennsylvanians (vocal by Clare Hanlon) was popular in 1928 and the song has subsequently been recorded by many artists.

== Notable recordings ==
- Judy Garland - Alone (1957)
- Ella Fitzgerald - Ella Fitzgerald Sings the Irving Berlin Songbook (1958)
- Judy Holliday - Trouble Is a Man (1958).
- Julie London - Around Midnight (1960)
- Bobby Darin - It's You or No One (1963)
- Sue Raney - All By Myself (1964).
- Barbra Streisand - The Way We Were (1974)
- Rosemary Clooney - Rosemary Clooney Sings the Music of Irving Berlin (1984)
- Ernie Andrews - How About Me (2006)
