= The Way We Were: Original Soundtrack Recording =

Soundtrack album by Barbra Streisand
- Released: January 30, 1974
- Recorded: 1973
- Length: 33:58
- Label: Columbia
- Producers: Marty Paich; Fred Salem

Barbra Streisand chronology
The Way We Were (1974)	The Way We Were: Original Soundtrack Recording (1974)	ButterFly (1974)

Marvin Hamlisch chronology
Save the Tiger (1973)	The Way We Were: Original Soundtrack Recording (1974)	The Sting (1974)

The Way We Were: Original Soundtrack Recording is the soundtrack album to the film of the same title by American singer Barbra Streisand. Released by Columbia Records on January 30, 1974, the soundtrack comprises twelve songs, mostly written by Marvin Hamlisch, three of which are different versions of "The Way We Were". The album was mostly produced by Fred Salem, with the exception of the title track produced by Marty Paich. Hamlisch and Salem collaborated to create five new songs for the soundtrack, with cover songs for the remainder.

Faring well commercially, the album peaked at numbers 20 and 23 in the United States and Canada, respectively. It also charted in the United Kingdom in 2005. The Recording Industry Association of America certified it a gold album for sales exceeding 500,000 copies.

== Background and composition ==
The soundtrack was executively produced by Freddie "Fred" Salem, while album track "The Way We Were" was produced by Marty Paich; the aforementioned track also featured additional songwriting from Marvin Hamlisch and Alan and Marilyn Bergman. All of the songs included on the soundtrack were previously used throughout the film's score, while "The Way We Were" is the only composition featuring lyrics; the single's lyrics detail the relationship of Katie Morosky and Hubbell Gardiner, whose personal life is documented throughout the film. Other songs on the album include Salem's productional covers of "Red Sails in the Sunset", "River, Stay 'Way from My Door", "In the Mood", and "Wrap Your Troubles in Dreams (And Dream Your Troubles Away)". Hamlisch and Salem also collaborated to create five brand new tracks: "Look What I've Got", "Like Pretty", "Katie", "Did You Know It Was Me?", and "Remembering".

== Promotion and reception ==
Professional ratings
Review scores
Source	Rating
AllMusic	3/5 stars

Both the soundtrack and Streisand's studio album of the same name were fronted by the commercial single release of the title song on September 27, 1973. The single was a huge success after its release, topping the United States' Billboard Hot 100 and Canada's RPM Top Singles chart, while also reaching the top ten on the ARIA Charts in Australia.

Hamlisch and the Bergmans were widely praised for their work on the title track, winning the Academy Award for Best Original Song at the 46th Academy Awards, with Hamlisch also winning the Academy Award for Best Original Score for his work on the film's score (which is featured on the soundtrack). "The Way We Were" also won the Golden Globe Award for Best Original Song in 1974 and the Grammy Award for Song of the Year in 1975.

The title song became a Streisand signature, and was certified platinum on August 19, 1997, selling over 1,000,000 copies in the United States.

== Commercial performance ==
In the United States, the album debuted at number 82 on the Billboard 200 for the week ending February 16, 1974. In the following two publications, the soundtrack reached numbers 48 and 29, respectively, and on March 16 of the same year, it reached its peak position of number 20, the same week Streisand's solo album topped the chart. It dropped to number 22 the preceding week and spent a total of fifteen weeks on the Billboard 200, with its last position being at number 177 on May 25. The Recording Industry Association of America certified the soundtrack Gold for shipments upwards of 500,000 sales on October 20, 1998.

On Canada's Top Albums/CDs chart conducted by RPM, the record debuted at number 71 during the week of March 2, 1974. The Way We Were: Original Soundtrack Recording peaked at number 23 on March 16 and spent another week at that same position on March 23. It spent its final week in Canada at number 72 for the week ending May 11, 1974, totaling nine weeks on the chart. The soundtrack also made an appearance on the Official Charts Company's UK Compilation Chart in March 2005, where it debuted and peaked at number four.

== Track listing ==
The Way We Were: Original Soundtrack Recording – Standard edition
No.	Title	Writer(s)	Producer(s)	Length
1.	"The Way We Were"	Alan Bergman; Marilyn Bergman; Marvin Hamlisch	Marty Paich	3:53
2.	"Red Sails in the Sunset"	Hugh Williams; Jimmy Kennedy	Fred Salem	1:43
3.	"Look What I've Got"	Hamlisch	Salem	3:06
4.	"Like Pretty"	Hamlisch	Salem	2:21
5.	"River, Stay 'Way from My Door"	Harry M. Woods; Mort Dixon	Salem	1:55
6.	"The Way We Were" (Instrumental)	A. Bergman; M. Bergman; Hamlisch	Paich	3:03
7.	"Katie"	Hamlisch	Salem	2:28
8.	"In the Mood"	Andy Razaf; Joe Garland	Salem	2:41
9.	"Did You Know It Was Me?"	Hamlisch	Salem	4:35
10.	"Remembering"	Hamlisch	Salem	1:22
11.	"Wrap Your Troubles in Dreams (And Dream Your Troubles Away)"	Harry Barris; Ted Koehler; Billy Moll	Salem	3:02
12.	"The Way We Were" (Finale)	A. Bergman; M. Bergman; Hamlisch	Paich	3:49
Total length:				33:58

== Charts ==
Chart performance for The Way We Were: Original Soundtrack Recording
Chart (1974–2005)	Peak position
Canada Top Albums/CDs (RPM)	23
UK Compilation Albums (OCC)	4
US Billboard 200	20
US Cashbox Top Albums	18

== Certifications ==
Region	Certification	Certified units/sales
United States (RIAA)	Gold	500,000^{^}
^{^} Shipments figures based on certification alone.
