= The Way We Were =

1973 film by Sydney Pollack

- Theatrical release poster by Bill Gold
- Directed by: Sydney Pollack
- Screenplay by: Arthur Laurents
- Based on: The Way We Were; 1972 novel by Arthur Laurents
- Produced by: Ray Stark
- Starring: Barbra Streisand; Robert Redford; Bradford Dillman; Viveca Lindfors; Herb Edelman; Murray Hamilton; Patrick O'Neal; Lois Chiles
- Cinematography: Harry Stradling Jr.
- Edited by: John F. Burnett
- Music by: Marvin Hamlisch
- Production company: Rastar
- Distributed by: Columbia Pictures
- Release date: October 19, 1973
- Running time: 118 minutes
- Country: United States
- Language: English
- Budget: $5 million
- Box office: $50 million

The Way We Were is a 1973 American romantic drama film directed by Sydney Pollack and starring Barbra Streisand and Robert Redford. Arthur Laurents adapted the screenplay from his own 1972 novel of the same name, which was based on his college days at Cornell University and his experiences with the House Un-American Activities Committee.

A box-office success, the film was nominated for several awards and won the Academy Awards for Best Original Dramatic Score and Best Original Song for the theme song "The Way We Were". It ranked at number six on AFI's 100 Years...100 Passions survey of the top 100 greatest love stories in American cinema. The Way We Were is considered one of the great romantic films.

The soundtrack album became a gold record and hit the Top 20 on the Billboard 200, while the title song became a gold single, topping the Billboard Hot 100 and selling more than two million copies. Billboard named "The Way We Were" as the number 1 pop hit of 1974. In 1998, the song was inducted into the Grammy Hall of Fame and finished at number eight on the American Film Institute's 100 Years... 100 Songs list of top tunes in American cinema in 2004. It also was included in the list of Songs of the Century, by the Recording Industry Association of America and the National Endowment for the Arts.

== Plot ==
Katie Morosky and Hubbell Gardiner are college students from different backgrounds. Katie is Jewish, with strong political opinions which she freely shares, most striking of which is her support of communism. Hubbell is from a reserved, traditional WASP background, who is dubious of politics and politicians. As their paths cross, Katie admires Hubbell's good looks, athleticism and talent at writing. Hubbell is impressed with Katie's commitment to whatever she believes in. Katie does not hide her contempt of Hubbell's friends, and they in turn mock Katie and her passionate political stances. Despite the differences, Hubbell and Katie quietly admire one another. They share a moment after Hubbell sells a story, and at their senior prom they briefly dance before parting ways.

The two meet again in New York City near the end of World War II: Katie juggles multiple jobs, and Hubbell is back from active duty as a naval officer in the South Pacific. The unlikely pair fall in love. After President Franklin D. Roosevelt dies, Katie is incensed when Hubbell's friends make disparaging jokes. She rejects Hubbell's indifference towards their insensitivity and dismissive political engagement. Hubbell is frustrated by Katie's bluntness and strong opinions; he ends their relationship, but they eventually reconcile.

Hubbell receives an offer to adapt his novel into a screenplay, but Katie is concerned that his talent will be wasted in Hollywood. Despite her apprehensions, they move to Malibu, where Hubbell's studio contract offers an affluent lifestyle. As they are unpacking, we find out that they are now married. As the Hollywood blacklist grows and McCarthyism encroaches on their lives, Katie's political activism resurfaces, potentially jeopardizing Hubbell's reputation and livelihood.

Katie and others publicly confront the government over personal privacy and free speech. Her involvement strains the marriage, and Hubbell becomes alienated over Katie's political combativeness. Although Katie is pregnant, Hubbell has an affair with his former college girlfriend. Katie realizes that he is not the man she idealized and will always choose the easiest path. Hubbell is emotionally exhausted and unable to live up to Katie's expectations. After their daughter Rachel is born, the two divorce.

Years later, Katie and Hubbell meet by chance in front of the Plaza Hotel in New York City, where Katie is demonstrating to "Ban the Bomb". A taxi interrupts their reunion, but they part with a tender, bittersweet farewell.

== Cast ==
- Barbra Streisand as Katie Morosky
- Robert Redford as Hubbell Gardiner
- Bradford Dillman as J.J.
- Lois Chiles as Carol Ann
- Patrick O'Neal as George Bissinger
- Viveca Lindfors as Paula Reisner
- Allyn Ann McLerie as Rhea Edwards
- Murray Hamilton as Brooks Carpenter
- Herb Edelman as Bill Verso
- Diana Ewing as Vicki Bissinger
- Sally Kirkland as Pony Dunbar
- George Gaynes as El Morocco Captain
- James Woods as Frankie McVeigh
- Susan Blakely as Judianne

== Production ==
In 1937, while an undergraduate at Cornell, Arthur Laurents was introduced to political activism by a student who became the model for Katie Morosky, a member of the Young Communist League and an outspoken opponent of Francisco Franco and his effort to take control of Spain via the Spanish Civil War. The fiery campus radical organized rallies and a peace strike, and the memory of her fervour remained with Laurents long after the two lost touch.

Laurents decided to develop a story with a similar character at its centre, but was unsure what other elements to add. He recalled a creative writing instructor named Robert E. Short, who felt he had a good ear for dialogue and had encouraged him to write plays. His first instinct was to create a crisis between his leading lady and her college professor, but he decided her passion needed to be politics, not writing. What evolved was a male character who had a way with words, but no strong inclination to apply himself to a career using them.

Because of his own background, Laurents felt it was important for his heroine to be Jewish and share his outrage at injustice. He also thought it was time a mainstream Hollywood film had a Jewish heroine, and because Barbra Streisand was the industry's most notable Jewish star, he wrote the role of Katie Morosky for her. Laurents had known Streisand for some time, having cast her in his 1962 Broadway musical I Can Get It for You Wholesale. Hubbell Gardiner, initially a secondary character, was drawn from several people Laurents knew. The first name was borrowed from urbane television producer Hubbell Robinson, who had hired Laurents to write an episode of ABC Stage 67. The looks and personality came from two primary sources - writer Peter Viertel and a man Laurents referred to only as "Tony Blue Eyes", an acquaintance who inspired the scene where the creative writing instructor reads Hubbell's short story to his class.

In his 2023 book about the making of the film, journalist Robert Hofler questions Laurents' account of the inspiration for the story, pointing out that Laurents also said Katie was "mainly me" and that Hubbell was partly inspired by Laurents' own two great loves, actor Farley Granger and real estate developer Tom Hatcher.

Laurents wrote a lengthy treatment for Ray Stark, who read it on a transcontinental flight and called the screenwriter the moment he arrived in Los Angeles to greenlight the project. Laurents had been impressed with They Shoot Horses, Don't They? and suggested Sydney Pollack to direct. Streisand was impressed that he had studied with Sanford Meisner at the Neighborhood Playhouse in Manhattan and seconded the choice. Stark was less enthusiastic, but agreed because Pollack assured him he could deliver Robert Redford for the role of Hubbell, which Laurents had written with Ryan O'Neal in mind. O'Neal's affair with Streisand was at its end, and Stark wanted to avoid conflicts between the leads.

Laurents ultimately regretted recommending Pollack. The director demanded the role of Hubbell be made equal to that of Katie and throughout filming, for unexplained reasons, he kept Laurents away from Redford. What was intended to be the final draft of the screenplay was written by Laurents and Pollack at Stark's condominium in Sun Valley, Idaho. Laurents, dismayed to discover very little of his work remained when it was completed, left the project. Over time, 11 writers, including Dalton Trumbo, Alvin Sargent, Paddy Chayefsky, and Herb Gardner, contributed to the script. The result was a garbled story filled with holes that neither Streisand nor Redford liked. Laurents was asked to return and did so only after demanding and receiving an exorbitant amount of money.

Because the film's start date was delayed while it underwent numerous rewrites, Cornell was lost as a shooting location; filming instead took place at Union College in Schenectady, New York. Other locations included the village of Ballston Spa in upstate New York; Central Park; the beach in Malibu, California; and Union Station in Los Angeles, the latter for a scene Laurents felt was absurd and fought to have deleted, without success.

Laurents was horrified when he saw the first rough cut of the film. He thought it had a few good scenes, and some good moments in bad scenes, but overall, he thought it was a badly photographed, jumbled mess lacking coherence. Both stars appeared to be playing themselves more often than their characters, and Streisand often used a grand accent that Laurents felt hurt her performance. Pollack admitted the film was not good, accepted full responsibility for its problems, and apologized for his behavior. The following day, he retreated to the editing room to improve it as much as possible. Laurents felt the changes made it better, but never as good as it could have been.

A decade after the film was released, Redford, having made peace with Laurents, contacted him to discuss the possibility of collaborating on a new project and eventually the two settled on a sequel to The Way We Were. In it, Hubbell and his daughter, a radical like Katie, would meet, but be unaware of their relationship, and complications would ensue. Both agreed they did not want Pollack to be part of the equation. Laurents sent Redford the completed script, but aside from receiving a brief note acknowledging the actor had received it and looked forward to reading it, he never heard from him again. In 1982, Pollack approached Laurents about a sequel Stark had proposed, but nothing transpired following their initial discussion. In 1996, Streisand came across the sequel Laurents had written and decided she wanted to produce and direct it, as well as co-star with Redford, but did not want to work with Stark. Laurents thought the script was not as good as he remembered it being and agreed to rewrite it once Stark agreed to sell the rights to the characters and their story to Streisand. Again, nothing happened. The following year, Stark asked Laurents if he was interested in adapting the original film for a stage musical starring Kathie Lee Gifford. Laurents declined and any new projects related to the film have been in limbo.

== Soundtrack ==
The musical score for The Way We Were was composed by Marvin Hamlisch. A soundtrack album was released in January 1974 to much success. At the time of its initial release, the album peaked at number 20 on the Billboard 200. On October 19, 1993, it was re-released on CD by Sony. It includes Streisand's rendition of "The Way We Were", which at the time of the film's release was a commercial success and her first number-one single in the United States. It entered the Billboard Hot 100 in November 1973 and charted for 23 weeks, eventually selling over a million copies and was number one for three non-consecutive weeks in February 1974. On the Adult Contemporary chart, it was Streisand's second top hit, following "People" a decade earlier. It was the title track of a Streisand album that reached number one.

== Reception ==
In North America, the film was a massive commercial success, grossing $49,919,870. It was the fifth-high-grossing film of the year, earning an estimated $10 million in North American rentals in 1973, and a total of $22,457,000 in its theatrical run.

=== Critical response ===
The Way We Were was featured on the Top Ten Films of 1973 by the National Board of Review. Roger Ebert of the Chicago Sun-Times gave the film three stars out of four and called it "essentially just a love story, and not sturdy enough to carry the burden of both radical politics and a bittersweet ending." He added "It's easy to forgive the movie a lot because of Streisand. She's fantastic. She's the brightest, quickest female in movies today, inhabiting her characters with a fierce energy and yet able to be touchingly vulnerable...The Redford character perhaps in reaction to the inevitable Streisand performance, is passive and without edges. The primary purpose of the character is to provide someone into whose life Streisand can enter and then leave. That's sort of thankless, but Redford handles it well." Ebert further added "Instead, inexplicably, the movie suddenly and implausibly has them fall out of love - and they split up without resolving anything, particularly the plot." Gene Siskel of the Chicago Tribune gave the film two-and-a-half stars out of four and wrote that "with Streisand as the film's intellectual mouthpiece—and listen, as a singer, God bless her—there is no way that the film's ideas are going to come off as anything but patronizing and tinged with comedy."

In her review, Pauline Kael noted, "the decisive change in the characters' lives which the story hinges on takes place suddenly and hardly makes sense." She was not the only critic to question the gap in the plot. Of the scene in the hospital shortly after Katie gives birth and they part indefinitely, Molly Haskell wrote, "She seems to know all about it, but it came as a complete shock to me." In his review, critic John Simon wrote: "Some things, I suppose, never change, like the necktie Redford wears in two scenes that take place many years apart."

Variety called it "a distended, talky, redundant, and moody melodrama" and adds, "but Robert Redford has too little to work with in the script," and "The overemphasis on Streisand makes the film just another one of those Streisand vehicles where no other elements ever get a chance." Time Out London observed "[W]ith the script glossing whole areas of confrontation (from the Communist '30s to the McCarthy witch-hunts), it often passes into the haze of a nostalgic fashion parade. Although Streisand's liberated Jewish lady is implausible, and emphasises the period setting as just so much dressing, Redford's Fitzgerald-type character...is an intriguing trailer for his later Great Gatsby. It's a performance that brings more weight to the film than it deserves, often hinting at depths that are finally skated over."

Conversely, TV Guide awarded the film three out of four stars, calling it "an engrossing, if occasionally ludicrous, hit tearjerker" and "a great campy romance."

The film holds a rating of 65% on Rotten Tomatoes based on 37 reviews. The site's critics consensus states: "The Way We Were isn't politically confrontational enough for its story of ideological opposites falling in love to feel authentic, but Barbra Streisand and Robert Redford's beaming star power gives this melodrama romantic lift."

=== Awards and nominations ===
Award	Category	Nominee(s)	Result	Ref.
Academy Awards	Best Actress	Barbra Streisand	Nominated	
Academy Awards	Best Art Direction	Art Direction: Stephen B. Grimes; Set Decoration: William Kiernan	Nominated	
Academy Awards	Best Cinematography	Harry Stradling Jr.	Nominated	
Academy Awards	Best Costume Design	Dorothy Jeakins and Moss Mabry	Nominated	
Academy Awards	Best Original Dramatic Score	Marvin Hamlisch	Won	
Academy Awards	Best Original Song	"The Way We Were"; Music by Marvin Hamlisch; Lyrics by Alan and Marilyn Bergman	Won	
ASCAP Film and Television Music Awards	Most Performed Feature Film Standards on TV	"The Way We Were"; Alan Bergman, Marilyn Bergman, and Marvin Hamlisch	Won	
British Academy Film Awards	Best Actress in a Leading Role	Barbra Streisand	Nominated	
David di Donatello Awards	Best Foreign Actress	Barbra Streisand	Won (Note: Tied with Tatum O'Neal for Paper Moon.)	
Golden Globe Awards	Best Actress in a Motion Picture – Drama	Barbra Streisand	Nominated	
Golden Globe Awards	Best Original Song – Motion Picture	"The Way We Were"; Music by Marvin Hamlisch; Lyrics by Alan and Marilyn Bergman	Won	
Grammy Awards	Song of the Year	"The Way We Were"; Alan Bergman, Marilyn Bergman, and Marvin Hamlisch	Won	
Grammy Awards	Album of Best Original Score Written for a Motion Picture or a Television Special	The Way We Were: Original Soundtrack Recording; Alan Bergman, Marilyn Bergman, and Marvin Hamlisch	Won	
International Film Festival of India	Best Actress	Barbra Streisand	Won	
National Board of Review Awards	Top Ten Films		9th Place	
Turkish Film Critics Association Awards	Best Foreign Film		10th Place	
Writers Guild of America Awards	Best Drama – Written Directly for the Screen	Arthur Laurents	Nominated	

== See also ==
- List of American films of 1973
