= The Way We Were (song) =

1973 single by Barbra Streisand

Single by Barbra Streisand

from the album The Way We Were
- B-side: "What Are You Doing the Rest of Your Life?"
- Released: September 27, 1973
- Studio: United Western Recorders (Las Vegas, NV)
- Genre: Pop; soft rock; easy listening
- Length: 3:29
- Label: Columbia
- Songwriters: Alan Bergman; Marilyn Bergman; Marvin Hamlisch
- Producer: Marty Paich

Barbra Streisand singles chronology
"If I Close My Eyes" (1973)	"The Way We Were" (1973)	"All in Love Is Fair" (1974)

Audio
- "Barbra Streisand - The Way We Were (Official Audio)" on YouTube

"The Way We Were" is a song by American singer Barbra Streisand from her fifteenth studio album of the same name. It was released as the album's lead single on September 27, 1973, on Columbia Records. The 7" single was distributed in two different formats, with the standard edition featuring B-side track "What Are You Doing the Rest of Your Life?" and the Mexican release instead including an instrumental B-side. The song was written by Marilyn Bergman, Alan Bergman, and Marvin Hamlisch, while production was handled by Marty Paich. "The Way We Were" was specifically produced for the record, in addition to three other tracks, including her then-upcoming single "All in Love Is Fair" (1974).

Its lyrics detail the melancholic relationship between the two main characters Katie Morosky (Streisand) and Hubbell Gardiner (Robert Redford) in the 1973 film of the same name. Its appeal was noted by several music critics, who felt its impact helped revive Streisand's career. The song also won two Academy Awards, which were credited to the songwriters of the track. The single was also a commercial success, topping the charts in both Canada and on the US Billboard Hot 100, while peaking in the top 40 in Australia and on the UK Singles Chart. Additionally, "The Way We Were" was 1974's most successful recording in the United States, where it was placed at number one on the Billboard Year-End Hot 100 singles list. It has since been certified Platinum by the RIAA for sales of over one million units. Streisand has also included "The Way We Were" on various compilation albums, with it most recently appearing on 2010's Barbra: The Ultimate Collection.

Several renditions and versions of the single exist, including one by American singer Andy Williams, who sang it for his thirty-second studio album of the same name in 1974. American band Gladys Knight & the Pips also recorded a live cover of I Feel a Song (1974), which was commercially successful; it reached number four in the United Kingdom and number 11 in the United States.

== Development and release ==
American composer and producer Marvin Hamlisch created the final melody for "The Way We Were", which initially was a problem between himself and the singer. Barbra Streisand had asked Hamlisch to produce a composition in minor key, but he instead wrote it in major key due to his fear of the song's lyrics being revealed too quickly. Shortly following the commercial success of "The Way We Were", Columbia Records began compiling tracks for the singer's then-upcoming fifteenth studio album The Way We Were. Since time was limited, the record consists of several non-album compositions recorded by Streisand, including the aforementioned title and her preceding single "All in Love Is Fair" (1974). According to the liner notes of her 1991 greatest hits album Just for the Record, "The Way We Were", "All in Love is Fair", "Being at War with Each Other", and "Something So Right" were the only tracks specifically created for the album.

The recording and two other variants were also included on the original soundtrack for the film: the original, the instrumental, and the "Finale" version. Individually, it was released as a 7" single in the United States on September 27, 1973, through Columbia Records; the aforementioned edition included the studio version of "The Way We Were", in addition to the B-side single "What Are You Doing the Rest of Your Life?", a cover of the 1969 Michael Dees song. The Japanese release featured the same versions with slightly different durations, while the version intended for the Mexico market includes the instrumental version of "The Way We Were" as the B-side track instead.

== Lyrical interpretation ==
Hamlisch and Alan and Marilyn Bergman wrote "The Way We Were" while Marty Paich handled its production. In particular, the lyrics detail the personal life of Katie Morosky, the character Streisand portrays in the film The Way We Were. Specifically, her troubled relationship with Robert Redford's Hubbell Gardiner is explained, "Memories light the corners of my mind / Misty watercolor memories of the way we were" and "Memories may be beautiful and yet". Streisand sings, "What's too painful to remember / We quickly choose to forget", where she longs for nostalgia, which Rolling Stone's Stephen Holden described as an implication that "resonate[s] in the current social malaise". In the beginning of what seems to be a bridge, Streisand whispers, "If we had the chance to do it all again / Tell me would we? Could we?".

== Legacy and accolades ==
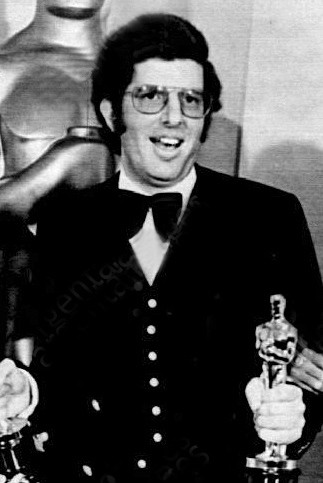
Hamlisch was awarded two Academy Awards for his credited work on "The Way We Were".

"The Way We Were" received significant success after its original release in North America; Jon Landau of Rolling Stone said that its impact proved worthy enough to revive Streisand's career as a musical artist. However, he was more critical of the singer "ignor[ing] the line-by-line variations in [the] song's meaning". Nevertheless, the mass appeal of the single was labeled by Turner Classic Movies's Andrea Passafiume as "one of the most recognizable songs in the world". Hamlisch and the Bergmans won the Academy Award for Best Original Song at the 46th Academy Awards; Hamlisch also won the Oscar for Best Original Score for the film.

The tune also won the Golden Globe Award for Best Original Song at the 31st Golden Globe Awards in 1974 and the Grammy Award for Song of the Year at the 17th Annual Grammy Awards in 1975. In 2008, the song was inducted into the Grammy Hall of Fame. According to the National Endowment for the Arts and Recording Industry Association of America (RIAA) in their list of the top 365 "Songs of the Century", the single was placed at number 298. In 2023, American Songwriter and The Guardian ranked the song number five and number one, respectively, on their lists of the greatest Barbra Streisand songs.

== Commercial performance ==
In the United States, "The Way We Were" debuted at number 92 on the Billboard Hot 100 for the week ending November 24, 1973, where it served as the issue's seventh-highest debut. After steadily climbing the list for ten consecutive weeks, it topped the chart on February 2, 1974, where it knocked Ringo Starr's version of "You're Sixteen" (1973) from the highest spot. After being temporarily displaced by The Love Unlimited Orchestra's debut single "Love's Theme", Streisand reclaimed the number one rank for two more weeks beginning February 16 of the same year. "The Way We Were" departed the Billboard Hot 100 on April 27 at the position of number 53; in total, it spent 23 consecutive weeks among the chart's ranking. On the Billboard Year-End Hot 100 singles of 1974 list, the single also topped the chart on the list of the year's 100 highest-ranking songs. On August 19, 1997, in addition to several of Streisand's recordings, "The Way We Were" was certified Platinum in the United States by the RIAA for sales exceeding one million copies. On the Billboard Adult Contemporary chart, where it was then referred to as the Easy Listening chart, it reached the number one spot on January 12, 1974, and held that position for two weeks.

Outside of Streisand's native country, the single found similar commercial success. In Canada, "The Way We Were" entered the chart compiled by RPM at number 45, where it was the week's third-highest debut. On its seventh week, it reached the top position that was previously held by Terry Jacks' cover of "Seasons in the Sun" (1973). It spent a total of 13 weeks in Canada before departing at its position at number 58. It also topped the Adult Contemporary chart in its 11th week, also in 1974. In their year-end chart, "The Way We Were" was ranked as Canada's eighth best-selling single of 1974. In the final year of Australia's chart compiled by Go-Set, Streisand's recording peaked at number six. It also reached its peak position on the UK Singles Chart at number 31 for the week of March 30, 1974.

== Live performances ==
Streisand has performed "The Way We Were" on numerous occasions and is often considered to be one of her signature songs. On her third live album, One Voice (1986), the single was included alongside a live video of the singer performing it. In September 1994, Streisand released The Concert, which also included a live rendition of "The Way We Were" as performed at Madison Square Garden in Manhattan. At a series of live concerts in 1999 and 2000 in Las Vegas, the singer sang several songs from her catalog and was billed as one of her final live performances; the entirety of the event was then included on Timeless: Live in Concert (2000), including the "Introduction" segment which featured "The Way We Were" in addition to "You'll Never Know", "Something's Coming", and a live interview with actress Shirley MacLaine. The single was also placed on Live in Concert 2006 (2006) and Back to Brooklyn (2013), with its appearance on the latter consisting of a medley of both "The Way We Were" and "Through the Eyes of Love". Streisand sang part of the song at the 2026 Academy Awards ceremony to honor her late friend and costar Robert Redford.

== Track listings and formats ==
Standard edition 7" single

- A1 "The Way We Were" – 3:29
- B1 "What Are You Doing the Rest of Your Life?" – 3:17

Japan 7" single

- A1 "The Way We Were" – 3:30
- B1 "What Are You Doing the Rest of Your Life?" – 3:19

Mexico 7" single

- A1 "The Way We Were" – 3:29
- B1 "The Way We Were (Instrumental Version)" – 2:58

== Personnel ==
- Barbra Streisand - vocals
- Paul Humphrey - drums
- Carol Kaye - bass
- Marty Paich - arranging

== Charts ==
=== Weekly charts ===
Weekly chart performance for "The Way We Were"
Chart (1973–2017)	Peak position
Australia (Go-Set)	6
Australia (Kent Music Report)	7
Canada Top Singles (RPM)	1
Canada Adult Contemporary (RPM)	1
France (SNEP)	145
Italy (Musica e dischi)	24
Japan Singles (Oricon)	76
UK Singles (Official Charts)	31
US Billboard Hot 100	1
US Adult Contemporary (Billboard)	1

=== Year-end charts ===
Year-end chart performance for "The Way We Were"
Chart (1974)	Position
Australia (Kent Music Report)	37
Canada Top Singles (RPM)	8
US Billboard Hot 100	1
US Adult Contemporary (Billboard)	2

=== All-time charts ===
All-time chart performance for "The Way We Were"
Chart (1958-2018)	Position
US Billboard Hot 100	116

== Certifications and sales ==
Certifications for "The Way We Were"
Region	Certification	Certified units/sales
Australia (ARIA)	Gold	35,000^{‡}
Japan (RIAJ)	—	38,650
United Kingdom (BPI)	Silver	200,000^{‡}
United States (RIAA)	Platinum	1,000,000^{^}
^{^} Shipments figures based on certification alone.^{‡} Sales+streaming figures based on certification alone.

== Cover versions ==
Several renditions of "The Way We Were" have been released since its initial distribution in 1973. American singer Andy Williams recorded a cover of the track for his 1974 and thirty-second studio album of the same name. AllMusic's William Ruhlmann was divided on Williams' interpretation and claimed that fans of Streisand's version would not be interested in this one. However, Mike Parker from the Daily Express considered his version and the album as a whole as a classic. American actress and singer Doris Day performed the song in a CBS special, Doris Day Today, in 1975. Bing Crosby recorded the song for his album Feels Good, Feels Right in 1976. He also sang it at his London Palladium concerts that year and in 1977.

Dorothy Squires included it for her 1978 LP Rain Rain Go Away which was produced by Norman Newell. In 2008, the singer-songwriter Beyoncé, sang a rendition of the song in front of Streisand herself at the 2008 Kennedy Center Honors. In 2018, the group Il Divo included the translated version "Toi et Moi" on their album Timeless. The song was sung twice on the TV series Angel, firstly by Mercedes McNab as Harmony Kendall in the 2002 season 2 episode "Disharmony" and later in the 2002 season 4 episode "Spin the Bottle" by Andy Hallett as Lorne.

In 1973, Filipino singer Rico J. Puno covered the song for his album entitled The Way We Were with some alterations of its lyrics which includes a speech at the first part and his Filipino cover version at the last part, retaining the original English lyrics on the middle part.

In 2014, Streisand re-recorded the track with Lionel Richie for her thirty-fourth studio album, Partners (2014). Walter Afanasieff's contributions and added background vocals to the aforementioned edition were acclaimed by Los Angeles Times' Mikael Wood, who described the composition as a "fluttering" one. "The Way We Were" has also been selected for inclusion on several of Streisand's compilation albums, including Barbra Streisand's Greatest Hits Vol. 2 (1978), Memories (1981), Just for the Record... (1991), The Essential Barbra Streisand (2002), and Barbra: The Ultimate Collection (2010).

On 23rd February 2026, British artist Jessie Ware covered the song for the 2026 BAFTA Film Awards' memorandum segment where actors, producers and creative individuals in movie, television and entertainment are paid tribute to following their death.

== Gladys Knight & the Pips version ==
"The Way We Were" / "Try to Remember"

Single by Gladys Knight & the Pips

from the album I Feel a Song
- A-side: "Try to Remember"
- B-side: "The Need to Be"; "Love Finds Its Own Way"; "Midnight Train to Georgia"
- Released: March 14, 1975
- Genre: Soul; R&B
- Length: 4:48
- Label: Buddah
- Songwriters: Alan Bergman; Marilyn Bergman; Marvin Hamlisch; Tom Jones; Harvey Schmidt
- Producer: Ralph Moss

Gladys Knight & the Pips singles chronology
"Love Finds Its Own Way" (1975)	"The Way We Were" / "Try to Remember" (1975)	"Money" (1975)

=== Background and reception ===
American R&B band Gladys Knight & the Pips recorded a live cover of "The Way We Were" as part of a blend with the song "Try to Remember", released on their 1974 studio album I Feel a Song. The cover/blend was released by Buddah Records on March 14, 1975, in a 7-inch format, paired with the B-side singles "Love Finds Its Own Way" and "The Need to Be". Due to the inclusion of "Try to Remember", the song features additional writing by Tom Jones and Harvey Schmidt. Alex Henderson from AllMusic noted how Gladys Knight's spoken prediction that 1974 would come to be seen as "the good old days" had come true. Rashod Ollison from The Virginian-Pilot declared it a "stirring remake" and liked the track's live orchestra. He further lauded the B-side track "The Need to Be" for being a "deeply soulful declaration of independence". Knight's rendition of "The Way We Were" was sampled in 1993 for "Can It Be All So Simple" by the Wu-Tang Clan from their album Enter the Wu-Tang (36 Chambers).

=== Chart performance ===
On the United States' Billboard Hot 100, "The Way We Were" reached its highest position of number 11 on August 2, 1975. It spent a total of 17 weeks charting before decreasing weekly until meeting its final position at number 57 for the week ending August 16, 1975. In Canada, it peaked at number 29 on the list compiled by RPM. It also entered the Adult Contemporary charts in both the United States and Canada, ranking at numbers two and three, respectively. In the United Kingdom, the Gladys Knight & the Pips version was more successful than Streisand's. It peaked at number four in that country, becoming their first top ten single; it would tie with their 1977 single "Baby, Don't Change Your Mind" as their highest-peaking track.

=== Track listings and formats ===
Standard edition 7" single

- A1 "The Way We Were" / "Try to Remember" – 4:48
- B1 "The Need to Be" – 4:07

United Kingdom 7" single

- A1 "The Way We Were" / "Try to Remember" – 4:45
- B1 "Love Finds Its Own Way" – 3:51

United Kingdom Reissued 7" single

- A1 "The Way We Were" / "Try to Remember" – 4:45
- B1 "Midnight Train to Georgia" – 4:41

=== Charts ===
Chart performance for "The Way We Were"
Chart (1975)	Peak position
Canada Top Singles (RPM)	29
Canada Adult Contemporary (RPM)	3
UK Singles (Official Charts)	4
US Billboard Hot 100	11
US Adult Contemporary (Billboard)	2

== See also ==
- Billboard Year-End Hot 100 singles of 1974
- List of Billboard Hot 100 number-one singles of 1974
- List of number-one adult contemporary singles of 1974 (U.S.)
- List of number-one singles of 1974 (Canada)
