= What Are You Doing the Rest of Your Life? =

Song in the film The Happy Ending

Song by Michael Dees

from the album The Happy Ending
- Released: December 21, 1969
- Genre: Film soundtrack
- Length: 3:34
- Songwriters: Alan and Marilyn Bergman; Michel Legrand

"What Are You Doing the Rest of Your Life?" is a song with lyrics written by Alan Bergman and Marilyn Bergman and original music written by Michel Legrand for the 1969 film The Happy Ending, performed by Michael Dees. The song was nominated for an Academy Award for Best Original Song but lost out to "Raindrops Keep Fallin' on My Head".

The same title was used 25 years earlier by Ted Koehler and Burton Lane for their song for the 1944 film Hollywood Canteen. A Ted Weems recording of 1938 also has an identical title.

== Background ==
Alan Bergman would recall that after Michel Legrand had written eight melodies which were somehow not viable for the film, Marilyn Bergman suggested the opening line "What are you doing the rest of your life?", and Legrand then completed the song's melody based on that phrase. Marilyn Bergman would later comment on the dual meanings of the phrase "What are you doing the rest of your life?" to the film: its title alludes to the marriage proposal Mary Spencer (played by Jean Simmons) received and accepted sixteen years earlier but in the context of Mary's present-day angst, the question is now one Mary must ask herself.

== Cover versions ==
- In 1972 Sarah Vaughan recorded "What Are You Doing the Rest of Your Life?" for the album Sarah Vaughan with Michel Legrand on which Legrand acted as arranger and conductor. The track would win Legrand the 1972 Grammy Award for Best Instrumental Arrangement Accompanying a Vocalist.
- Frank Sinatra recorded his version of the song for his 1974 Reprise album, "Some Nice Things I've Missed".
- In 1969 Barbra Streisand released a cover version as a promotional single in the United States, which was later issued on the album The Way We Were in 1974.
- In 2006 Billy Childs, Gil Goldstein, and Heitor Pereira won the 2006 Grammy Award for the same category for a version performed by trumpeter Chris Botti and vocalist Sting on Botti's 2005 album To Love Again.
- In 2026, the song was quoted by the British musician James Blake on the song "Rest of Your Life" from his album Trying Times.
