= Barbra Streisand's Greatest Hits =

Greatest hits album by Barbra Streisand
- Released: January 1970
- Recorded: 1963–1968
- Length: 32:21
- Label: Columbia
- Producers: Mike Berniker; Jack Gold; Robert Mersey; Ettore Stratta; Warren Vincent

Barbra Streisand chronology
Hello, Dolly! (1969)	Barbra Streisand's Greatest Hits (1970)	On a Clear Day You Can See Forever (1970)

Barbra Streisand's Greatest Hits is the first greatest hits album recorded by American vocalist Barbra Streisand. It was released in January 1970, by Columbia Records. The record is a compilation consisting of 11 commercially successful singles from the singer's releases in the 1960s, with a majority of them being cover songs. The songs on Barbra Streisand's Greatest Hits originally appeared on one of the singer's eight previous albums and span in release from 1963 to 1968. It contains her most commercially successful tracks, including her first Billboard Hot 100 top ten single "People" and top 40 entry "Second Hand Rose". The album was distributed on compact disc in 1986 and rereleased under the title The Hits in 2006.

Well received by music critics, Barbra Streisand's Greatest Hits received a five star rating from Rolling Stone. It was also praised by AllMusic's William Ruhlmann, who found the album crucial to reinventing Streisand's career. The album charted in Canada, the United Kingdom, and the United States, peaking at numbers 17, 44, and 32, respectively. It was later certified double Platinum by the Recording Industry Association of America (RIAA) for shipments of two million copies. The album also received a Gold certification in Australia. A second compilation consisting of Streisand's hits from the 1970s, was released in 1978 and titled Barbra Streisand's Greatest Hits Volume 2.

== Background and release ==
Barbra Streisand's Greatest Hits was released in January 1970, through Barbra Streisand's record label, Columbia Records. A retrospective collection, it contains 11 singles from the singer's first decade in the recording industry, ranging from "My Coloring Book" (1963) to "Happy Days Are Here Again" (1968). The material was recorded between 1963 and 1968 and originally included on five of her studio albums, the two Funny Girl recordings (original cast album and film soundtrack), and her first live album – A Happening in Central Park (1968). Featuring her most commercially successful songs, the album features one Billboard Hot 100 top ten single ("People"), one top 40 single ("Second Hand Rose"), and seven of Streisand's lower-charting releases: "Free Again", "Gotta Move", "He Touched Me", "My Man", "Sam, You Made the Pants Too Long", and "Why Did I Choose You". The compilation also included three non-charting songs – "Don't Rain on My Parade", "Happy Days Are Here Again", and "My Coloring Book". The version of "Happy Days Are Here Again" that appears on Barbra Streisand's Greatest Hits was recorded live during her A Happening in Central Park concert in 1968. The album's 11 tracks were produced by a variety of musicians, including Mike Berniker, Jack Gold, Robert Mersey, Ettore Stratta, and Warren Vincent.

The compilation was also printed on 8-track cartridges where it was distributed with the same track listing in a revised order. On January 26, 1986, Barbra Streisand's Greatest Hits was released for the first time on CD. Since its first appearance on CDs, it has been reissued on several occasions. In 2006, Sony Music Entertainment and BMG Rights Management repackaged the album under the name The Hits, featuring the same track listing and similar front artwork. A second compilation consisting of Streisand's hits from the 1970s, was released in 1978 and aptly titled Barbra Streisand's Greatest Hits Volume 2.

== Critical reception ==
Professional ratings
Review scores
Source	Rating
AllMusic	4.5/5 stars
Rolling Stone	5/5 stars

Barbra Streisand's Greatest Hits received praise from music critics. William Ruhlmann from AllMusic appreciated Streisand's decision to release a greatest hits album as he felt the singer's "career was in decline" and in need of improvement; he also favored the album's live rendition inclusion of "Happy Days Are Here Again", which he considered to be one of the best songs on her debut album, The Barbra Streisand Album (1963). Concluding, Ruhlmann wrote: "For casual fans, [the album] made for a good sampling of Streisand's most prominent '60s work." As part of Rolling Stone's The New Rolling Stone Record Guide, released in 1983, they rated the collection a five out of five stars rating. Streisand's second volume from 1978 and Guilty from 1980 also achieved the same status.

== Commercial performance ==
Barbra Streisand's Greatest Hits reached the record charts in three countries. In the United States, the compilation debuted at number 77 on the Billboard 200 chart for the week ending February 28, 1970, while also serving as the week's highest new entry. During its fifth week on the chart, it peaked at number 32. Barbra Streisand's Greatest Hits spent a total of 30 weeks on the Billboard 200. It was certified Gold by the Recording Industry Association of America for shipments of 500,000 copies on May 4, 1971, and by November 21, 1986, the record had been certified double Platinum for shipments of two million albums. On the UK Albums Chart, the compilation peaked at number 44, where it became Streisand's second entry altogether, immediately following her sixth studio album, My Name Is Barbra, Two... (1965), which peaked at number six. Elsewhere, the album achieved its highest position in Canada, where it peaked at number 17 on the official Top Albums chart compiled by RPM. Although the compilation did not chart in Australia, the Australian Recording Industry Association (ARIA) certified Barbra Streisand's Greatest Hits Gold in 2000, signifying shipments of at least 35,000 copies.

== Track listing ==
Barbra Streisand's Greatest Hits – Standard edition
No.	Title	Writer(s)	Producer(s)	Length
1.	"People" (from Funny Girl, 1964)	Bob Merrill; Jule Styne	Mike Berniker	3:39
2.	"Second Hand Rose" (from My Name Is Barbra, Two..., 1965)	Grant Clarke; James F. Hanley	Robert Mersey	2:08
3.	"Why Did I Choose You" (from My Name Is Barbra, 1965)	Michael Leonard; Herbert Martin	Mersey	2:49
4.	"He Touched Me" (from My Name Is Barbra, Two...)	Ira Levin; Milton Schafer	Mersey	3:08
5.	"Free Again" (from Je m'appelle Barbra, 1966)	Robert Colby; Michel Jourdan; Armand Canfora; Joss Baselli	Ettore Stratta	3:40
6.	"Don't Rain on My Parade" (from Funny Girl, 1968)	Merrill; Styne	Jack Gold	2:44
7.	"My Coloring Book" (from The Second Barbra Streisand Album, 1963)	Fred Ebb; John Kander	Berniker	4:09
8.	"Sam, You Made the Pants Too Long" (from Color Me Barbra, 1966)	Smiley Lewis; Victor Young; Fred Whitehouse; Milton Berle	Warren Vincent	2:04
9.	"My Man" (from My Name Is Barbra)	Irving Bibo; Leo Wood; Maurice Yvain	Mersey	2:55
10.	"Gotta Move" (from The Second Barbra Streisand Album)	Peter Matz	Berniker	1:58
11.	"Happy Days Are Here Again" (live) (from A Happening in Central Park, 1968)	Jack Yellen; Milton Ager	Gold	3:07
Total length:				32:21

Barbra Streisand's Greatest Hits – 8-track cartridge edition
No.	Title	Length
1.	"People"	3:39
2.	"Don't Rain on My Parade"	2:44
3.	"Gotta Move"	1:58
4.	"He Touched Me"	3:08
5.	"Sam, You Made the Pants Too Long"	2:04
6.	"My Man"	2:55
7.	"Second Hand Rose"	2:08
8.	"Why Did I Choose You"	2:49
9.	"Happy Days Are Here Again" (live)	3:07
10.	"Free Again"	3:40
11.	"My Coloring Book"	4:09
Total length:		32:21

== Personnel ==
Credits adapted from the liner notes of Barbra Streisand's Greatest Hits.

- Barbra Streisand – vocals
- Mike Berniker – production (tracks 1, 7, 10)
- Don Costa – arranger, conductor
- Jack Gold – production (tracks 6, 11)
- Frank Laico – recording engineer
- Michel Legrand – arranger, conductor
- Peter Matz – arranger, conductor
- Robert Mersey – production (tracks 2, 3, 4, 9)
- Lawrence Schiller – cover photo
- Ettore Stratta – production (track 5)
- Warren Vincent – production (track 8), sound supervisor
- Stan Weiss – recording engineer

== Charts ==
Chart (1970)	Peak position
Canada Top Albums/CDs (RPM)	17
UK Albums (Official Charts)	44
US Billboard 200	32
US Cashbox Top Albums	21

== Certifications ==
Region	Certification	Certified units/sales
Australia (ARIA)	Gold	35,000^{^}
Netherlands (NVPI)	Gold	50,000^{^}
United States (RIAA)	2× Platinum	2,000,000^{^}
^{^} Shipments figures based on certification alone.
