= Love Is the Answer (album) =

2009 album by Barbra Streisand

Studio album by Barbra Streisand
- Released: September 29, 2009
- Recorded: November 17, 2008–2009
- Studio: Capitol (Hollywood)
- Genre: Jazz
- Length: 58:55
- Label: Columbia
- Producer: Diana Krall; Tommy LiPuma

Barbra Streisand chronology
| Guilty Pleasures (2005) | Love Is the Answer (2009) | The Ultimate Collection (2010) |

Love Is the Answer is the thirty-second studio album by American singer Barbra Streisand, released on September 29, 2009. The album consists of jazz standards and was produced by Diana Krall and Tommy LiPuma. It also features Krall on piano and orchestral arrangements by Johnny Mandel, Anthony Wilson and Alan Broadbent. A deluxe edition contains a bonus disc featuring versions of the songs with just Streisand's vocals and Krall's quartet.

The album received critical acclaim and became Streisand's record-breaking ninth number one album on the Billboard 200. This resulted in making Streisand the only artist to have a number one album in America in five different decades. The album was certified Gold on November 13 by the RIAA, giving Streisand her 51st Gold record in the US.

== Promotion ==
To promote the album, Streisand performed for one night only on September 26 at the Village Vanguard some forty-eight years after she opened for Miles Davis at the same venue. On October 2 she also gave a rare interview and performed live for a BBC TV special hosted by Jonathan Ross. Streisand's performance at the Village Vanguard was released on DVD as One Night Only: Barbra Streisand and Quartet at The Village Vanguard and was certified Platinum in the United States.

The album was promoted in a QVC special which offered a Special Edition DVD that includes bonus video tracks of "People" from My Name Is Barbra (1965); "Yesterdays" from Color Me Barbra (1966); "I'm Always Chasing Rainbows" from The Belle of 14th Street (1967); "Silent Night" from A Happening in Central Park (1968); "Crying Time" (with Ray Charles) from Barbra Streisand...And Other Musical Instruments (1973).

== Critical reception ==
Professional ratings
Aggregate scores
| Source | Rating |
|---|---|
| Metacritic | 83/100 |
Review scores
| Source | Rating |
| AllMusic | 4.5/5 stars |
| Entertainment Weekly | (B+) |
| The Guardian | 3/5 stars |
| The Times | 3/5 stars |

John Bush of AllMusic described the album as "a heart-wrenching experience with virtually every song", noting that the sparse arrangements leave "practically nothing in the way of her voice". Billboard remarked that Streisand gives her "trademark romantic-ballad treatment to 13 well-known standards", though it questioned the album's pace, asking "how slow can you go?".

Joan Anderman of The Boston Globe wrote that Streisand's "gorgeous tones and powers of interpretation are utterly intact", describing the album as a "return to basics" centered on classic standards, though she added that the "placid strings and feathery flutes seem to mock, rather than embellish, Streisand's pointed, bittersweet reflections".

Leah Greenblatt of Entertainment Weekly wrote that the album is "swathed in champagne bubbles and black velvet", adding that although it is "not exactly galvanizing stuff", Streisand "still sings like buttah". John Fordham of The Guardian wrote that Streisand's delivery of the standards is "as accomplished as might be expected from a diva", though he added that the album is "really a reprofiled Streisand set for her fans, rather than an unexpected diversion for jazz ones".

Adrian Edwards of the BBC praised the record's "discreet and luminous arrangements" and its "winning diversity", concluding that the double album "celebrates Streisand's enduring star quality".

== Commercial performance ==
The same day of the release of the album, Mariah Carey released her album Memoirs of an Imperfect Angel. Initially a favorite to be number one on the Billboard 200 during its debut week, it was announced that Paramore's Brand New Eyes was ahead on sales and would likely reach the top spot of the Billboard 200 and surpass Mariah Carey. What began as a battle between those two albums ended with Streisand surpassing both and achieving the pole position of the charts. This found Streisand extending her previously held record of most consecutive decades with number one albums achieved by any artist. She has achieved at least one number one album in five consecutive decades – the 1960s, the 1970s, the 1980s, the 1990s and the 2000s. Love Is the Answer is also Streisand's ninth number one album in the U.S., making her the fourth artist with the most number one albums in history, behind The Beatles (19), Jay-Z (11), and Elvis Presley (10). Bruce Springsteen and The Rolling Stones have also achieved nine number-one albums each.

On learning of the success, Streisand immediately posted a "letter" on her official website:

I was just told that Love Is the Answer came out at Number One, and I want to share that honor with all of you.. my fans, my friends.. who have made that possible. I want to share it as well with Diana Krall and Tommy LiPuma and everyone who worked on the album... with Jay Landers and especially my manager Marty Erlichman and my team at Columbia Records. You'd think that getting the news that you've been Number One in five consecutive decades would make you feel old, but this makes me feel young. Thank you all.

In the UK, the album initially landed at number four, with sales of 30,000 copies. The ensuing media coverage of Streisand's U.S. chart placement helped bolster UK sales, and during its second week of release, Love Is the Answer managed to climb to the number one spot, surpassing Madonna's Celebration album in sales. Immediately, Streisand sent another note to her fans through her website:

When the album went to #1 in the States I was surprised and thrilled. To have the same thing happen on "the other side of the pond" is just as exciting. I've always loved spending time in the UK and it's so gratifying to learn how this album has been embraced. With all my appreciation and thanks! Barbra.

Achieving the top position in both countries, Love Is the Answer is only the fourth Barbra Streisand record to be number one in both the U.S. and the UK, and the first to do so since 1980's Guilty.

In Canada, the album debuted at number two with sales of 13,000 copies (only 1,000 copies behind Madonna's album Celebration). In Spain, Streisand achieved her second top 10 album, landing at number one with the 1980 multi-platinum Guilty album, and at number six with Love Is the Answer.

== Accolades ==
On 2 December 2010, the 53rd Grammy Awards nominations were announced, and the album was nominated for Best Traditional Pop Vocal Album. This was Streisand's 57th Grammy nomination in her career.

== Track listing ==
| No. | Title | Writer(s) | Length |
|---|---|---|---|
| 1. | "Here's to Life" | Artie Butler, Phyllis Molinary | 4:35 |
| 2. | "In the Wee Small Hours of the Morning" | Bob Hilliard, David Mann | 4:02 |
| 3. | "Gentle Rain" | Luiz Bonfá, Matt Dubey | 4:19 |
| 4. | "If You Go Away (Ne me quitte pas)" | Jacques Brel, Rod McKuen | 4:14 |
| 5. | "Spring Can Really Hang You Up the Most" | Fran Landesman, Tommy Wolf | 4:32 |
| 6. | "Make Someone Happy" | Betty Comden, Adolph Green, Jule Styne | 4:08 |
| 7. | "Where Do You Start?" | Johnny Mandel, Alan Bergman, Marilyn Bergman | 4:26 |
| 8. | "A Time for Love" | Johnny Mandel, Paul Francis Webster | 5:12 |
| 9. | "Here's That Rainy Day" | Johnny Burke, Jimmy Van Heusen | 5:04 |
| 10. | "Love Dance" | Ivan Lins, Gilson Peranzzetta, Paul Williams | 4:43 |
| 11. | "Smoke Gets in Your Eyes" | Jerome Kern, Otto Harbach | 4:22 |
| 12. | "Some Other Time" | Leonard Bernstein, Betty Comden, Adolph Green | 4:43 |
| 13. | "You Must Believe in Spring" (Bonus track) | Alan Bergman, Marilyn Bergman, Michel Legrand | 4:04 |

=== Deluxe edition ===
The second disc of the deluxe package, featuring Streisand and quartet, includes:

| No. | Title | Writer(s) | Length |
|---|---|---|---|
| 1. | "Here's To Life" | Artie Butler, Phyllis Molinary | 4:31 |
| 2. | "In The Wee Small Hours of the Morning" | Bob Hilliard, David Mann | 3:58 |
| 3. | "Gentle Rain" | Luiz Bonfa, Matt Dubey | 4:20 |
| 4. | "If You Go Away (Ne me quitte pas)" | Jacques Brel, Rod McKuen | 4:12 |
| 5. | "Spring Can Really Hang You Up the Most" | Tommy Wolf, Fran Landesman | 4:34 |
| 6. | "Make Someone Happy" | Jule Styne, Betty Comden, Adolph Green | 4:02 |
| 7. | "Where Do You Start?" | Johnny Mandel, Alan Bergman, Marilyn Bergman | 4:26 |
| 8. | "A Time for Love" | Johnny Mandel, Paul Francis Webster | 5:14 |
| 9. | "Here's that Rainy Day" | Johnny Burke, Jimmy Van Heusen | 5:03 |
| 10. | "Love Dance" | Ivan Lins, Gilson Peranzzetta, English lyrics by Paul Williams | 4:43 |
| 11. | "Smoke Gets in Your Eyes" | Jerome Kern, Otto Harbach | 4:17 |
| 12. | "Some Other Time" | Leonard Bernstein, Betty Comden, Adolph Green | 4:43 |

== Personnel ==
- Barbra Streisand – vocals
- Diana Krall – piano
- Jeff Hamilton – drums
- John Clayton – bass
- Anthony Wilson – guitar
- Robert Hurst – bass (tracks: 1, 2, 6, 11)
- Tamir Hendelman – piano (tracks: 1, 2, 6, 11, 12)
- Alan Broadbent – piano (tracks: 5, 7, 8, 9)
- Bill Charlap – piano (track: 13)
- Paulinho da Costa – percussion (tracks: 3, 10)

== Charts ==
=== Weekly charts ===
| Chart (2009) | Peak position |
|---|---|
| Australian Albums (ARIA) | 22 |
| Austrian Albums (Ö3 Austria) | 10 |
| Belgian Albums (Ultratop Flanders) | 12 |
| Belgian Albums (Ultratop Wallonia) | 33 |
| Canadian Albums (Billboard) | 2 |
| Danish Albums (Hitlisten) | 20 |
| Dutch Albums (Album Top 100) | 4 |
| French Albums (SNEP) | 27 |
| German Albums (Offizielle Top 100) | 28 |
| Greek Albums (IFPI) | 23 |
| Hungarian Albums (MAHASZ) | 13 |
| Italian Albums (FIMI) | 40 |
| Irish Albums (IRMA) | 21 |
| Mexican Albums (Top 100 Mexico) | 96 |
| New Zealand Albums (RMNZ) | 15 |
| Spanish Albums (Promusicae) | 6 |
| Swedish Albums (Sverigetopplistan) | 33 |
| Swiss Albums (Schweizer Hitparade) | 32 |
| UK Albums (OCC) | 1 |
| US Billboard 200 | 1 |
| US Top Jazz Albums (Billboard) | 2 |

=== Year-end charts ===
| Chart (2009) | Position |
|---|---|
| Canadian Albums (Billboard) | 49 |
| UK Albums (OCC) | 120 |
| US Billboard 200 | 83 |
| US Top Jazz Albums (Billboard) | 3 |

== Certifications and sales ==
| Region | Certification | Certified units/sales |
|---|---|---|
| Canada | — | 34,000 |
| Hungary (MAHASZ) | Gold | 3,000^{^} |
| Poland (ZPAV) | Gold | 10,000^{*} |
| United Kingdom (BPI) | Gold | 100,000^{*} |
| United States (RIAA) | Gold | 521,000 |
^{*} Sales figures based on certification alone.^{^} Shipments figures based on certification alone.
