= My Name Is Barbra (TV program) =

American television special

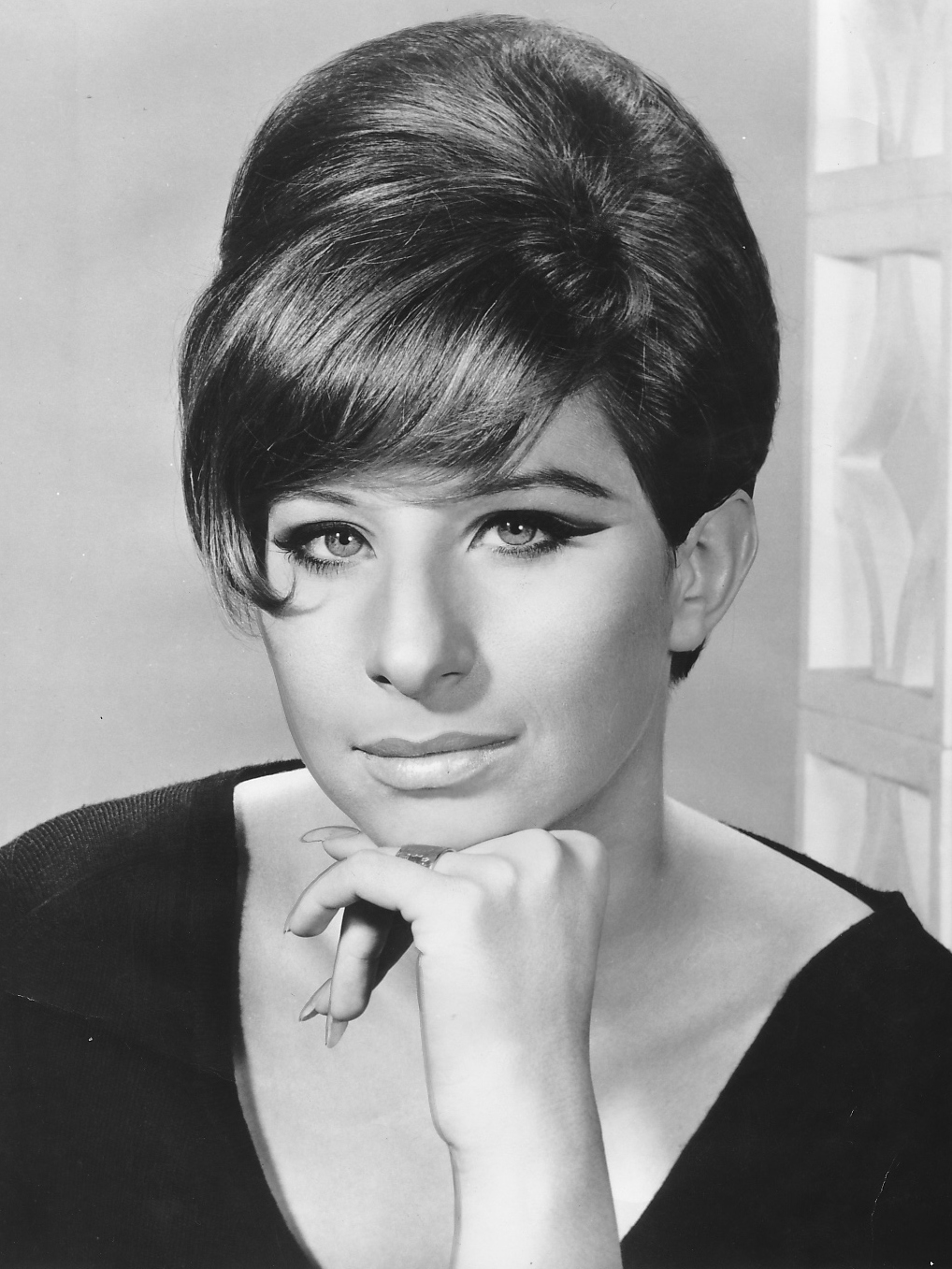
- Photo of Streisand from the special
- Written by: Robert Emmet
- Directed by: Dwight Hemion; Joe Layton
- Starring: Barbra Streisand
- Country of origin: United States
- Original language: English

Production
- Producer: Richard Lewine
- Running time: 60 minutes

Original release
- Network: CBS
- Release: April 28, 1965

My Name Is Barbra is a 1965 black-and-white television special, the first for singer and actress Barbra Streisand. Broadcast in conjunction with the release of Streisand's studio album of the same name, the special aired April 28, 1965 on CBS.

A critical success, the program earned Streisand a contract for four additional television specials. Columbia launched a major advertising campaign to promote the subsequent album My Name Is Barbra, Two... coinciding with the October rebroadcast of the TV special.

== Act one ==
1. My Name is Barbra
2. Much More
3. I'm Late
4. Make Believe
5. How Does the Wine Taste
6. A Kid Again
7. I'm Five
8. Sweet Zoo
9. Where Is The Wonder?
10. People

== Act two ==
1. I've Got The Blues
2. Monologue
3. Second Hand Rose
4. Give Me the Simple Life
5. I Got Plenty o' Nuttin'
6. Brother, Can You Spare a Dime?
7. Nobody Knows You When You're Down and Out
8. The Best Things in Life are Free

== Act three ==
1. When The Sun Comes Out
2. Why Did I Choose You?
3. Lover, Come Back to Me
4. I Am Woman
5. Don't Rain On My Parade
6. The Music That Makes Me Dance
7. My Man
8. Happy Days Are Here Again

== Critical acclaim ==
Streisand received unanimously positive reviews. The United Press International proclaimed "She is so great it is shocking. She may well be the most supremely talented and complete popular entertainer that this country has ever produced."

The show was the 16th top ranked show in the Nielsen ratings report for April 26-May 9, 1965.

== Awards ==
My Name Is Barbra was nominated in six categories at the 17th Primetime Emmy Awards, winning five, including Outstanding Individual Achievement in Entertainment. The special also won the Directors Guild of America Award for Outstanding Directorial Achievement in Television. The special earned Streisand her first Peabody Award.

== Certifications ==
Region	Certification	Certified units/sales
United States (RIAA)	Gold	50,000^{^}
^{^} Shipments figures based on certification alone.
