= Joe Layton =

American director and choreographer (1931–1994)

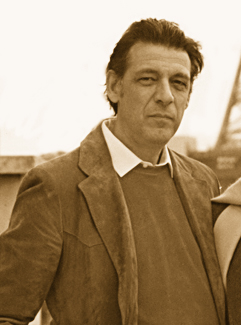
- Born: Joseph Lichtman; May 3, 1931; Brooklyn, New York, U.S.
- Died: May 5, 1994 (aged 63); Key West, Florida. U.S.
- Occupations: Choreographer, dancer
- Spouse: Evelyn Russell
- Children: 1
- Awards: Tony Award for Best Choreography; 1962 No Strings; 1969 George M!

Joe Layton (May 3, 1931 – May 5, 1994) was an American director and choreographer known primarily for his work on Broadway.

== Biography ==
Born Joseph Lichtman in Brooklyn, Layton began his career as a dancer in Wonderful Town (1953), and he appeared uncredited in the ensemble cast of the original live TV production of Rodgers and Hammerstein's Cinderella (1957) starring Julie Andrews. However, from the start, his primary interest was in musical staging. In addition to his many legitimate theatre credits, he conceived and directed Broadway concerts for Bette Midler (1975), Diana Ross (1976), Cher (1979), and Harry Connick Jr. (1990). He choreographed the Broadway version of The Sound of Music with Mary Martin and Theodore Bikel.

Joe Layton won the Tony Award for Best Choreography for No Strings (1962), starring Diahann Carroll, and for George M! (1968), starring Joel Grey.

In 1965, Layton won an Emmy Award for his work on My Name Is Barbra, the television special that introduced the public to the more sophisticated side of Barbra Streisand. It was his first of four collaborations with the star; the others were Color Me Barbra (1966), The Belle of 14th Street (1967) and Barbra Streisand ... And Other Musical Instruments (1973).

He also directed and/or produced specials for Paul Lynde, Hal Linden, Richard Pryor, and Olivia Newton-John.

Layton broke into films as the dance director for Thoroughly Modern Millie in 1967. He executive produced the first film version of Annie (1982) and reunited with Midler to choreograph For the Boys (1991).

Layton directed the 1972 West End and 1973 Los Angeles productions of Scarlett, the musical stage adaptation of Gone with the Wind, and the 1985 world première of the Jule Styne musical Pieces of Eight in Edmonton.

In 1976, Layton collaborated with Diana Ross for her one-woman international concert tour, An Evening with Diana Ross, for which the singer won a Special Event Tony Award for the concert's performance at The Palace Theater.

Joe Layton also choreographed a ballet for The Royal Ballet, London titled "Grand Tour" which received critical acclaim as well as a warm reception from the audiences around the UK. In 1984, Layton was one of the three choreographers credited with staging the dances for the Opening ("How the West Was Won" sequence) and Closing (the break-dances in "All Night Long") ceremonies of the 23rd Summer Olympiad of Los Angeles. He was also the Director of Paul Green's symphonic outdoor drama, "The Lost Colony" from 1964 to 1984.

In 1985, Layton directed and choreographed a Michael Edgley revival production of Aloha: A Musical of the Islands by Eaton "Bob" Magoon and Sir Robert Helpmann at His Majesty's Theatre, Auckland, Auckland (New Zealand), starring Derek Metzger from the Hamilton world première production, with Hollywood actress Patricia Morison. Derek Williams was the orchestrator and musical director for both productions. Despite being well reviewed however, houses for the Aloha revival didn't measure up to those for the première production and it finished early, destined for Honolulu, Hawaii with Layton again as Director, playing at the purpose-built Aloha Showroom until the Gulf War destroyed its tourist patronage.

From 1989, in preparation for the Aloha production, Layton had moved to live with Magoon in Honolulu where he also directed a revival production of Magoon's 13 Daughters at the Hawaii Theatre. During this period, Layton was suffering from AIDS, from which he eventually died in 1994 at his home Key West, Florida, aged 63.

== Personal life ==
He was married to actress Evelyn Russell in 1959; she predeceased him in February 1976. They had a son, Jeb James Layton.

== Selected credits ==
=== Stage ===
- Once Upon a Mattress (1959)
- The Sound of Music (1959)
- Tenderloin (1960)
- Greenwillow (1960)
- Sail Away (1961)
- No Strings (1962)
- The Girl Who Came to Supper (1963)
- Drat! The Cat! (1965)
- Sherry! (1967)
- George M! (1968)
- Dear World (1969)
- Two by Two (1970)
- An Evening with Diana Ross (stage show) (1975–1977)
- Platinum (1978)
- Barnum (1980)
- Bring Back Birdie (1981)
- The Three Musketeers (1984)
- Aloha: A Musical of the Islands (1985 and 1991)
- 13 Daughters (1989)

=== Television ===
- Once Upon a Mattress (1964)
- My Name Is Barbra (1965)
- Color Me Barbra (1966)
- The Belle of 14th Street (1967)
- Androcles and the Lion (1967)
- The Littlest Angel (1969)
- A Special Olivia Newton-John (1976)
- An Evening with Diana Ross (1977)
- The Hanna-Barbera Happy Hour (1978)
- Star Wars Holiday Special (1978)
- Paul Lynde at the Movies (1979)
- The Hal Linden Special (1979)

=== Film ===
- Thoroughly Modern Millie (1967)
- Richard Pryor: Live on the Sunset Strip (1982)
- Annie (1982)
- For the Boys (1991)

== Awards and nominations ==
Awards

- 1962 Tony Award for Best Choreography – No Strings
- 1965 Emmy Award for Conception, Choreography and Staging - My Name Is Barbra (TV)
- 1969 Tony Award for Best Choreography – George M!

Nominations

- 1960 Tony Award for Best Choreography – Greenwillow
- 1962 Tony Award for Best Direction of a Musical – No Strings
- 1966 Emmy Award - Musical Program - Color Me Barbra (TV)
- 1973 Emmy Award - Special - Comedy-Variety, Variety or Music - Barbra Streisand ... And Other Musical Instruments (TV)
- 1980 Tony Award for Best Choreography – Barnum
- 1980 Tony Award for Best Direction of a Musical – Barnum
- 1980 Drama Desk Award for Outstanding Choreography – Barnum
- 1980 Drama Desk Award for Outstanding Director of a Musical – Barnum
