= Miller Theater (Philadelphia) =

Theater in Pennsylvania, US

- Sam S. Shubert Theater (1918–91); Merriam Theater (1991-2022)
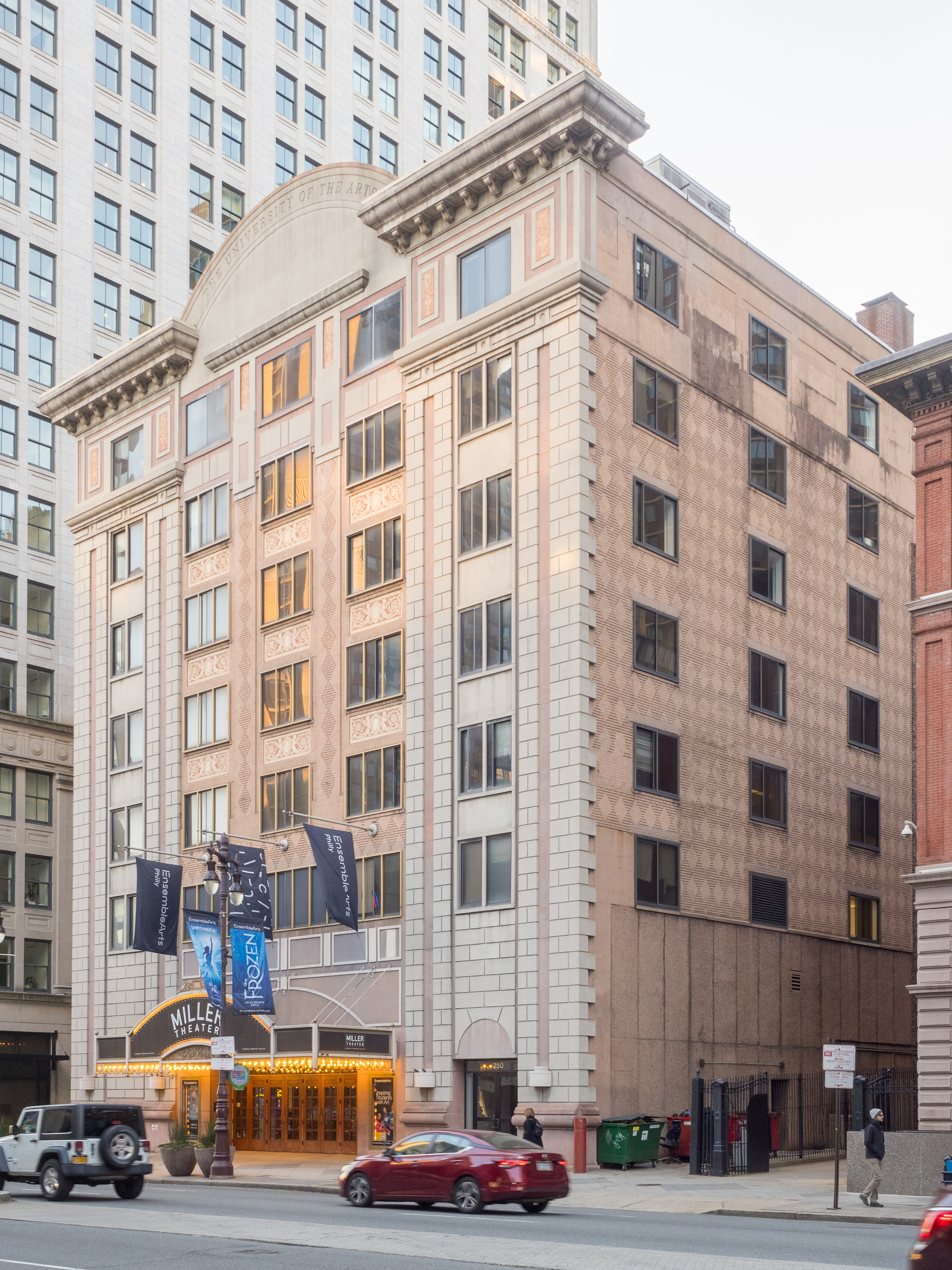
- Miller Theater in 2024
- Interactive map of Miller Theater
- Address: 250 S. Broad St. Philadelphia, Pennsylvania, U.S. U.S.
- Coordinates: 39°56′51″N 75°09′53″W
- Owner: Philadelphia Orchestra
- Capacity: 1,870
- Public transit: B at Walnut–Locust; PATCO Speedline at 12th–13th & Locust and 15th–16th & Locust; SEPTA bus: 4, 12, 27, 32

Construction
- Opened: August 26, 1918
- Years active: 1918–present
- Architect: Herbert J. Krapp

Website
- ensembleartsphilly.org

Miller Theater (formerly the Sam S. Shubert Theatre and then the Merriam Theater) is a theater within the Avenue of the Arts cultural district of the Center City district in Philadelphia, Pennsylvania, United States.

It is Philadelphia's most continuous location for touring Broadway shows. It is located at 250 South Broad Street. The theatre was built by The Shubert Organization in 1918.

In 1972, the theater came under the ownership of the Academy of Music, and was owned by the University of the Arts. In November 2016, it was purchased by the Kimmel Center for the Performing Arts, now the Philadelphia Orchestra and Ensemble Arts, and later renamed the Miller Theater.

== History ==
Lee and J. J. Shubert, theatrical producers, set out to build a theater memorializing their brother, Sam, who had died several years earlier in a railroad accident. Two theaters were built, one in Philadelphia and one in New York City. The Shubert Theatre in Philadelphia was built in 1918 on the site of the demolished Horticultural Hall that included the reuse of the hall's marble staircase in the theater's interior design. The building stands seven stories high with theater on the first level and six floors used for offices and classrooms. Herbert J. Krapp is the original architect. Additions and renovations were made in 1958.

In 1986, the stage and sound were modernized, and in 1991, the theatre was renamed and dedicated to John W. Merriam, a local entrepreneur, who was active for many years on the board of directors of the University of the Arts.

In March 2022, the theater was renamed Miller Theater in honor of Alan B. Miller, a founding board member of the Kimmel Center for the Performing Arts, who donated an undisclosed amount of money toward restorations and upgrades.

== Productions ==
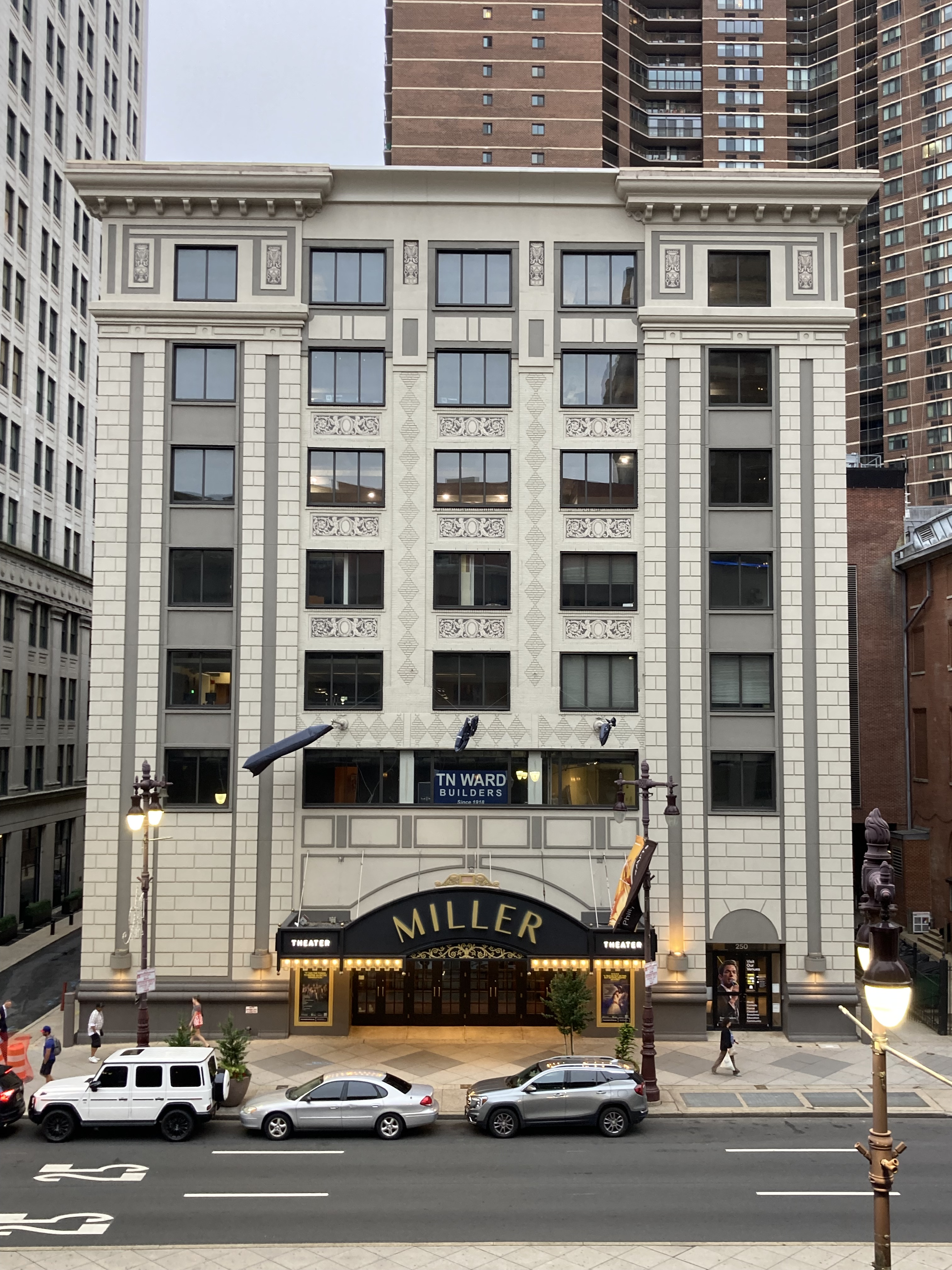
Miller Theater in 2025 after renovations

The theater opened in 1918 with a road production of a musical from London and New York called Chu Chin Chow, featuring Florence Reed. In the early years, George Gershwin musicals and Al Jolson reviews graced the Shubert stage. John Barrymore played Hamlet in the 1920s and burlesque was featured in the 1930s. Other performers included: Helen Hayes, Katharine Hepburn, Sammy Davis Jr., Angela Lansbury, and Laurence Olivier. Through the decades, a number of highly acclaimed Broadway, off-Broadway and one-night performances have been performed at the theater.

Pre- and Post-Broadway engagements at the Shubert:

- 1922: Hitchy-Koo of 1922
- 1927: Strike Up the Band, Funny Face, The Circus Princess
- 1928: Treasure Girl
- 1930: Girl Crazy
- 1931: Everybody's Welcome
- 1932: Face the Music
- 1944: Glad To See You
- 1944: Sadie Thompson
- 1945: Are You With It?
- 1946: Shootin' Star, Annie Get Your Gun, Around the World, Street Scene
- 1947: Music in My Heart, Bonanza Bound
- 1948: Kiss Me, Kate, Inside U.S.A., Sleepy Hollow, That's The Ticket, Brigadoon
- 1950: The Consul, Guys and Dolls, Out of This World
- 1951: Make a Wish, Paint Your Wagon
- 1952: Shuffle Along, Of Thee I Sing
- 1953: Hazel Flagg, Kismet
- 1954: Fanny, Silk Stockings, Plain and Fancy
- 1955: The Amazing Adele
- 1956: Mr. Wonderful, Strip For Action, The Most Happy Fella, Ziegfeld Follies of 1956, Happy Hunting, Bells Are Ringing
- 1957: Jamaica, Rumple, The Music Man
- 1958: Oh Captain!, Whoop-Up
- 1959: Redhead, Destry Rides Again, Gypsy, Take Me Along, Saratoga
- 1960: Greenwillow, The Unsinkable Molly Brown, Do Re Mi
- 1961: 13 Daughters, The Happiest Girl in the World, Donnybrook!, How to Succeed in Business Without Really Trying, Kean, Subways Are for Sleeping
- 1962: I Can Get It for You Wholesale, We Take the Town, La Belle, Stop the World – I Want to Get Off, Nowhere to Go But Up
- 1963: Hot Spot, Here's Love, 110 in the Shade, The Girl Who Came to Supper
- 1964: High Spirits, Golden Boy, Ben Franklin in Paris, Something More!, Bajour, Kelly
- 1965: Royal Flush, Drat! The Cat!, The Yearling, Sweet Charity
- 1966: It's a Bird...It's a Plane...It's Superman, Mame, Walking Happy
- 1967: Illya Darling, Sherry!, Henry, Sweet Henry, How Now, Dow Jones
- 1968: Here's Where I Belong, George M!, Her First Roman, The Fig Leaves Are Falling
- 1970: Lovely Ladies, Kind Gentlemen, Ari
- 1971: Lolita, My Love
- 1972: The Selling of the President, Irene
- 1974: Over Here!, Miss Moffat
- 1976: My Fair Lady, So Long, 174th Street
- 1979: I Remember Mama
