= John Battle =

John Battle may refer to:

- Sir John Battle (politician) (born 1951), British Labour politician, Member of Parliament for Leeds West (1987–2010)
- John S. Battle (1890–1972), American politician, Governor of Virginia 1950–1954
- John Battle (basketball) (born 1962), American former professional basketball player

== See also ==
- John Battles (1921–2009), American musical theatre actor
