= Second Hand Rose (song) =

Song written by Grant Clarke and James F. Hanley for Fanny Brice

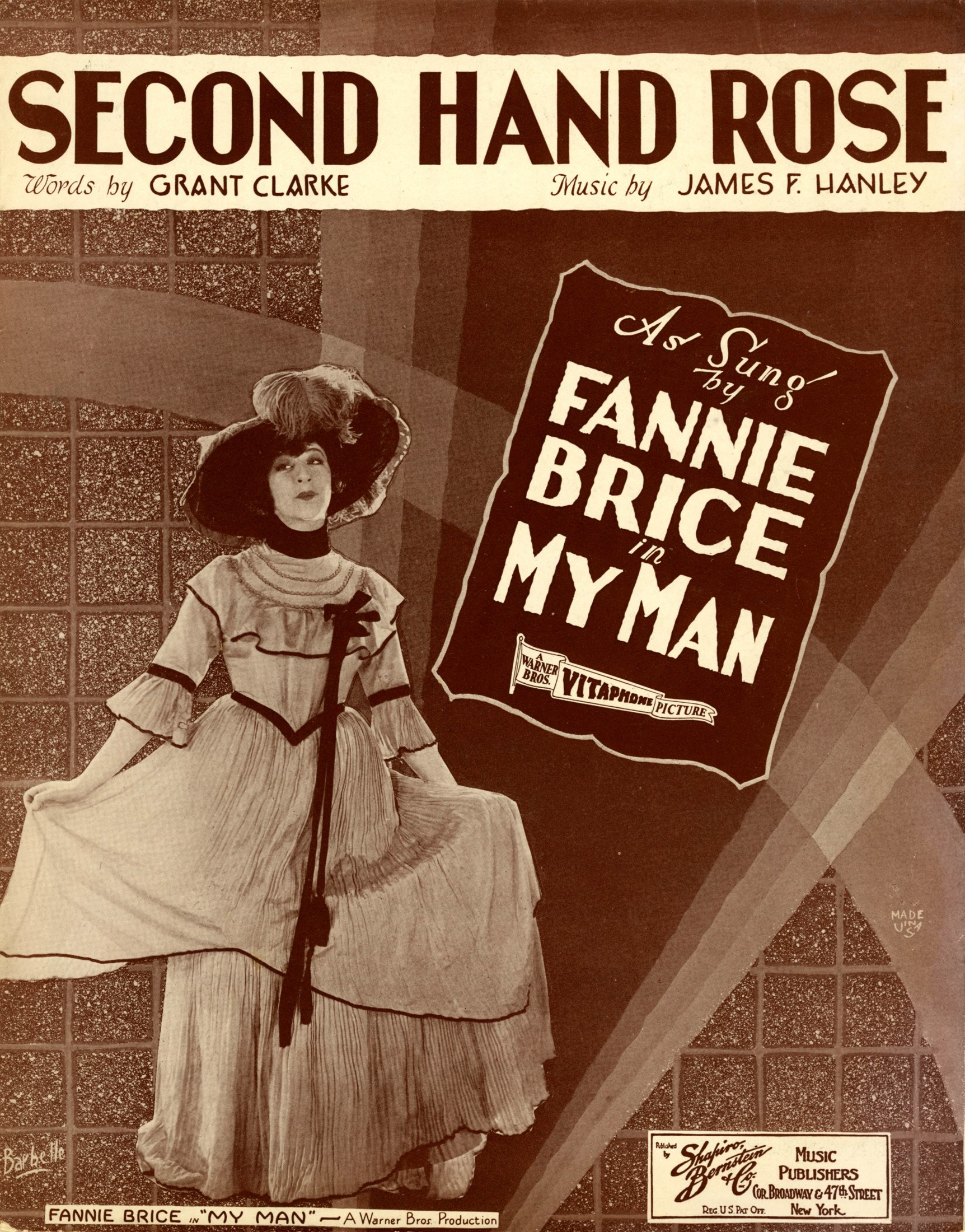
- Sheet music cover as reissued in conjunction with the 1928 film My Man

Single by Fanny Brice
- Released: 1922 (U.S.)
- Recorded: 1921
- Songwriters: Grant Clarke, James F. Hanley

Audio sample
- Recording of Second Hand Rose, performed by Fanny Brice (1921): file; help

"Second Hand Rose" is a 1921 popular song written by Grant Clarke and James F. Hanley for Fanny Brice. Releasd in 1922, Fanny Brice's recording of the song was a hit, reaching number three in the U.S. 43 years later, Barbra Streisand recorded her own version of the song, which would also chart.

== Fanny Brice version ==
Fanny Brice introduced the song in the revue Ziegfeld Follies of 1921 which opened at the Globe Theater (now known as the Lunt-Fontanne Theatre) on Broadway on June 21, 1921. Although one critic found this production of the revue not as good as previous versions, an exception was Brice: "This inimitable artist chalked up one of the few high marks of the evening with this song. For clarity of utterance, economy of means and a highly developed comic sense, Miss Brice has no peer on our stage. She got a genuine reception on her entrance and clamorous applause for her exit. And earned every bit of it legitimately."

Brice recorded "Second Hand Rose" in November 1921 at the Camden, NJ studios of the Victor Talking Machine Company. Released the following year, the song became a hit record, reaching #3 (US).

The song's popularity inspired a 1922 screen dramatization starring Gladys Walton.

The song was reissued and sung by Fanny Brice six years later in the 1928 film, My Man.

=== Chart performance ===
Chart (1922)	Peak position
U.S. Billboard	3

== Barbra Streisand version ==
"Second Hand Rose"
- Swedish 7-inch vinyl single

Single by Barbra Streisand

from the album My Name Is Barbra, Two...
- B-side: "The Kind of Man a Woman Needs"
- Released: December 1965 (U.S.)
- Recorded: September 13, 1965
- Studio: Studio A (New York, NY)
- Label: Columbia
- Songwriters: Grant Clarke, James F. Hanley

Barbra Streisand singles chronology
"He Touched Me" (1965)	"Second Hand Rose" (1965)	"Where Am I Going?" (1966)

Barbra Streisand, who had starred in Funny Girl, the 1964 Broadway musical based on Brice's life, recorded "Second Hand Rose" as part of her 1965 television special My Name Is Barbra, recording it in September 1965, and releasing it as a single for the tie-in studio album My Name Is Barbra, Two... in December 1965.

Streisand remembers in Just For The Record: "'Second Hand Rose' became part of a tongue-in-cheek fantasy sequence which was shot at Bergdorf Goodman's... And thanks to people I loved and loved working with—Joe Layton, Dwight Hemion, Peter Matz, Robert Emmett, Tom John, and, of course, Marty — I was able to realize my dream."

Her rendition became an international hit, reaching #14 in the UK, #6 in Australia, #32 on the U.S. Billboard Hot 100, and number one on the Canadian Adult Contemporary chart. (The record was subsequently included in Streisand's 1970 greatest hits compilation.)

Streisand had received similar acclaim for her cover of the Brice hit "My Man". The success of these recordings prompted both "Second Hand Rose" and "My Man" to be included in the 1968 film adaptation of Funny Girl, despite neither song appearing in the original stage musical.

=== Chart performance ===
Chart (1965–66)	Peak position
Australia (Kent Music Report)	6
Belgium (Ultratop 50 Flanders)	18
Canada Adult Contemporary (RPM)	1
Canada Top Singles (RPM)	30
Netherlands (Dutch Top 40)	3
Netherlands (Single Top 100)	3
New Zealand (Recorded Music NZ)	16
UK Singles (Official Charts)	14
US Adult Contemporary (Billboard)	5
US Billboard Hot 100	32
US Cash Box Top 100	36
