= The Hanna-Barbera Happy Hour =

American television comedy-variety show

- Genre: Comedy; Variety show
- Written by: Stan Hart
- Directed by: Jim Washburn; Joe Layton
- Voices of: Udana Power; Jane Hamilton James; Wenndy McKenzie; Daws Butler; Don Messick
- Composer: Billy Byers
- Country of origin: United States
- Original language: English
- No. of seasons: 1
- No. of episodes: 5

Production
- Executive producer: Joseph Barbera
- Producers: Ken Welch; Mitzie Welch; Joe Layton
- Running time: 60 minutes
- Production companies: Hanna-Barbera Productions; Welch/Layton/Welch Productions

Original release
- Network: NBC
- Release: April 13 – May 11, 1978

The Hanna-Barbera Happy Hour is an American television comedy-variety show produced by Hanna-Barbera Productions, which aired for five consecutive episodes on NBC from April 13 to May 11, 1978.

== Overview ==
The show was hosted by two life-size female puppets named Honey and Sis: Honey (voiced by Udana Power) is a 19-year-old willowy tall blond who fancies herself a gifted performer, while her 17-year-old red-headed sister Sis (voiced by Wendy McKenzie) is actually the talented one. On each episode, Honey and Sis sang, danced and participated in comedy sketches as "The Disco of Life", a soap opera parody where they interacted with people at a disco, and "The Truth Tub" where they relaxed in a hot tub and parodied TV shows such as Laverne & Shirley and Three's Company.

The guest stars during the five-week period included Melissa Sue Anderson, Tom Bosley, Gary Burghoff, Charo, Leif Garrett, Melissa Gilbert, Dan Haggerty, Linda Lavin, Peter Lupus, Gavin MacLeod, Tony Randall, Connie Stevens, The Sylvers, Twiggy, Abe Vigoda, Betty White and Anson Williams. The stars introduced themselves, rather than having an announcer do so. Costumed actors impersonating Hanna-Barbera cartoon characters such as Yogi Bear, Huckleberry Hound and Snagglepuss (all voiced by Daws Butler) made cameo appearances.

Honey and Sis were designed by Hanna-Barbera animator Iwao Takamoto and their costumes created by fashion designer Bob Mackie. They were manipulated by a team of six puppeteers who would wear full-body blue leotards in front of a blue screen, so that the two characters would be chroma-keyed on a different background.

== Episodes ==
- April 20: either Abe Vigoda, Melissa Gilbert, Betty White or Twiggy, Gary Burghoff, and Tony Randall
- April 23: Gavin MacLeod, Anson Williams, Charo, Yogi Bear; the Elmira Star-Gazette said in advance "In the truth tub this week is Anson; his problem is that girls want him for the wrong reasons. Are any adults watching?"
- April 30: Robert Conrad, Melissa Sue Anderson, Linda Lavin, Peter Lupus, Yogi Bear. Conrad entered the Truth Tub, perhaps as Baa Baa Black Sheep character Pappy Boyington.
- May 11: Tom Bosley, Connie Stevens, The Sylvers, Yogi Bear.

== Production credits ==
- Executive Producer: Joseph Barbera
- Directors: Jim Washburn, Joe Layton
- Producers: Ken Welch, Mitzie Welch, Joe Layton
- Music Director: Billy Byers
- Music Material: Ken Welch, Mitzie Welch
- Puppeteers: Pat Brymer, Van Snowden, Jerry Vogel, J. Paul Higgins, Greg Dendler, Steve Dolainski
- Choreographer: Joe Layton
- Animation Director: Iwao Takamoto
- Segment Director (Honey and Sis): Bob Mackie

== Reception ==
Although only scheduled for a five-week test run, The Hanna-Barbera Happy Hour failed in the ratings as it competed with ABC's Welcome Back, Kotter and What's Happening!! and was taken off the air, with reruns of CHiPs taking over its timeslot.
