= My Name Is Barbra =

Studio album by Barbra Streisand
- Released: May 3, 1965
- Recorded: February 1; April 26, 30, 1965
- Studios: Studio A, New York
- Genre: Traditional pop
- Length: 31:14
- Label: Columbia
- Producer: Robert Mersey

Barbra Streisand chronology
People (1964)	My Name Is Barbra (1965)	My Name Is Barbra, Two... (1965)

Singles from My Name Is Barbra
- 1. "Why Did I Choose You" Released: March 1965; 2. "My Man" Released: June 1965

My Name Is Barbra is the first of two studio album tie-ins by Barbra Streisand for her debut television special of the same name, which aired April 28, 1965, on CBS-TV. Boosted by the critical acclaim for the broadcast, the album was certified gold and peaked at number 2 on the US charts; by 1966, the album sold over one million copies worldwide.

The album cover photograph of Streisand at age five was taken by her brother Sheldon. A digitally restored and remastered CD was released in 1990.

Professional ratings
Review scores
Source	Rating
AllMusic	4.5/5 stars
The Encyclopedia of Popular Music	3/5 stars

== Song information ==
- The opening track "My Name Is Barbara" is from the song cycle I Hate Music by Leonard Bernstein, hence the spelling difference with the album title, based on Streisand's name.
- The CD release contains an extended arrangement of "Why Did I Choose You?", a minute longer than the original vinyl release.
- "Where Is the Wonder" was contributed by Dion McGregor and his roommate Michael Barr, who had sent many songs to publishers and were unsuccessful in getting them recorded; they viewed Streisand's rendition as a breakthrough in their songwriting career.

== Accolades ==
At the 8th Annual Grammy Awards the album garnered Streisand her third win for Best Female Vocal Performance, her fifth Grammy overall.

The National Association of Recording Merchandisers named Streisand the best-selling female vocalist of 1965.

== Track listing ==
Side One

1. "My Name Is Barbra" (Leonard Bernstein) – 0:53
2. a. "A Kid Again" (Johnny Melfi, Roger Perry) – 1:27
  b. "I'm Five" (Milton Schafer) – 0:38
3. "Jenny Rebecca" (Carol Hall) – 3:03
4. "My Pa" (Michael Leonard, Herbert Martin) – 2:30
5. "Sweet Zoo" (Jeffrey D. Harris) – 1:36
6. "Where Is The Wonder" (Michael Barr, Dion McGregor) – 2:18

Side Two

1. "I Can See It" (Tom Jones, Harvey Schmidt) – 3:06
2. "Someone to Watch Over Me" (George Gershwin, Ira Gershwin) – 2:43
3. "I've Got No Strings" (Leigh Harline, Ned Washington) – 2:49
4. "If You Were the Only Boy in the World" (Nat Ayer, Clifford Grey) – 3:28
5. "Why Did I Choose You?" (Michael Leonard, Herbert Martin) – CD: 3:46/Vinyl: 2:49
6. "My Man" (Jacques Charles, Channing Pollock, Albert Willemetz, Maurice Yvain) – 2:57

== Singles ==
1. "Why Did I Choose You?" / "My Love": US #77 (May 1, 1965)
2. "My Man" / "Where Is The Wonder ": US #79 (July 10, 1965)

== Charts ==
=== Weekly charts ===
Chart	Peak position
US Billboard 200	2

=== Year-end charts ===
Chart (1965)	Position
US Cash Box	18

Chart (1966)	Position
US Cash Box	62

== Certifications and sales ==
Region	Certification	Certified units/sales
United States (RIAA)	Gold	500,000^{^}
Summaries
Worldwide	—	1,000,000
^{^} Shipments figures based on certification alone.
