= Bravo Giovanni =

- Original Cast Recording
- Music: Milton Schafer
- Lyrics: Ronny Graham
- Book: A. J. Russell
- Basis: The Crime of Giovanni Venturi by Howard Shaw
- Productions: 1962 Broadway

Bravo Giovanni is a musical with a book by A. J. Russell, lyrics by Ronny Graham, and music by Milton Schafer. It is based upon Howard Shaw's 1959 novel, The Crime of Giovanni Venturi. The musical was conceived as a vehicle for opera star Cesare Siepi, and the story concerned a family-owned Italian restaurant's efforts to compete with a restaurant chain.

== Background ==
After three previews, the Broadway production, directed by Stanley Prager and choreographed by Carol Haney, opened on May 19, 1962, at the Broadhurst Theatre, where it ran for 76 performances. The cast included Cesare Siepi, Michele Lee, David Opatoshu, George S. Irving, Maria Karnilova, Lainie Kazan, Larry Fuller, and Baayork Lee.

The show received Tony Award nominations for Best Composer and Lyricist, Best Choreography, and Best Conductor and musical director.

An original cast recording was released by Columbia Records.

== Synopsis ==
Giovanni Venturi is the owner of a small, family-style trattoria in Rome. When a branch of the upscale Uriti restaurant chain opens up next door and threatens him with bankruptcy, his friend Amadeo suggests he tunnel from his basement to the Uriti basement kitchen, steal food from the dumbwaiter, and serve it in his place at reduced prices in order to stay competitive. Giovanni and his girlfriend Miranda successfully build the tunnel, and their efforts are profitable.

== Song list ==
Act I

- "Rome"
- "Uriti"
- "Breachy's Law"
- "I'm All I've Got"
- "The Argument"
- "Signora Pandolfi"
- "The Kangaroo"
- "If I Were the Man"
- "Steady, Steady"
- "We Won't Discuss It"
- "Ah, Camminare"

Act II

- "Breachy's Law" (Reprise)
- "Uriti Kitchen"
- "Virtue Arrivederci"
- "Bravo, Giovanni"
- "One Little World Apart"
- "Connubiality"
- "Miranda"

== Awards and nominations ==
=== Original Broadway production ===
Year	Award	Category	Nominee	Result
1963	Tony Award	Best Original Score	Milton Schafer and Ronny Graham	Nominated
1963	Tony Award	Best Choreography	Carol Haney	Nominated
1963	Tony Award	Best Conductor and Musical Director	Anton Coppola	Nominated

== Notes ==
- Bordman, Gerald (2001). American Musical Theater: A Chronicle. New York: Oxford University Press. ISBN 0-19-513074-X
- Shaw, Howard (1959). The Crime of Giovanni Venturi. New York: Henry Holt and Company.
