= Blue Pear Records =

Blue Pear Records was a semi-fictitious record label based in Longwood, Florida, which is best known for re-issuing rare cast recordings of obscure Broadway and off-Broadway musicals in the mid-1980s. The lack of production credits and other helpful identifying information on the LP sleeves has generally led to the assumption that they are bootleg recordings.

== Origins ==
The first LP to be released by Blue Pear Records, dating back to 1975, was not actually a theatre-related recording but, rather, an anthology of audio bloopers from the third season of Star Trek. Between the cancellation of the TV series in 1969 and the release of the first motion picture adaptation in 1979, there was a huge groundswell of interest in Star Trek, and a consequent demand for related media. Outtakes and bloopers, which had survived from the annual 'gag reels' prepared for the amusement of the original cast and crew, became popular when they were screened at fan conventions in the early 1970s by Gene Roddenberry himself. However, only the gag reels from the first and second series were made available in this way, while bloopers from the third and final series remained something of a Holy Grail for fans of the show.

As documented on the liner notes for the Blue Pear LP, a copy of the third season bloopers was found on a set of reel-to-reel audio tapes that were alleged to have been discovered in a trash can at Paramount Studios in Hollywood. The person who found the tapes subsequently pressed them onto a vinyl LP with the title Trek Bloopers: Rare Third Season Bloopers Never Heard Before, which was issued under the label name Blue Pear – an obvious pun on the word "blooper". In an era before home video recorders (not to mention the internet), the Blue Pear recording of Trek Bloopers remained highly sought after by Trekkies for some time. The LP cover featured a simplistic caricature of Leonard Nimoy as Spock (credited to an artist with the initials MDL), while the reverse had a track list and perfunctory liner notes. Along the bottom was the name of the record label, a small (trademarked) logo depicting a cluster of blue pears, and the rather unhelpful contact address of Longwood, Florida.

== Later releases ==
The first in the Blue Pear series of rare cast albums was a recording of the off-Broadway musical The Crystal Heart, which had closed in February 1960 after only nine performances,. The sleeve notes indicated that, at the time, a "commercially made record" had been co-produced by the composer, Baldwin Bergensen, and the lyricist/librettist, William Archibald, which was "issued on acetate to a few select individuals" and subsequently became an exceedingly rare collector's item. A copy was duly sourced by Blue Pear records, and re-pressed as vinyl LP with the catalogue number BP1001. The re-issue bears no date, although the liner notes refer to one of the cast members as the “late Virginia Vestoff”, which means the LP was released after her death in 1982. The LP also bore the following disclaimer I fine print, of which variations would appear on all subsequent issues: "This recording is taken from a rare acetate pressing of The Crystal Heart. While perfectly listenable, this monaural LP pressing may not achieve the fidelity of more modern standards of sound reproduction. However, we feel the rarity of the material justifies its release, even with occasional, almost unnoticeable audio imperfections".

Blue Pear Records went on to release many similar recordings of little-known Broadway and off-Broadway shows. Although it is sometimes assumed that these recordings were illegally taped by audience members, the LP liner notes are careful to point out that they came from legitimate (albeit non-commercial) sources such as authorized tape recordings made by the cast themselves (e.g. The Sap of Life) or through the theatre's own sound system (e.g. Drat! The Cat, The Body Beautiful and Zenda) or from professionally produced acetate recordings that were made for limited or private distribution (e.g. Kittiwake Island, Sing Muse and Look to the Lilies).

The complete Blue Pear series, comprising 21 LPs and at least one EP, covers a variety of theatre-related material. The first four releases comprised original cast recordings of little-known off-Broadway musicals from the early 1960s; later releases included counterparts from cult Broadway flops from other periods, such as The Body Beautiful (1958) and Drat! The Cat! (1965) and other shows that had closed out-of-town before even reaching Broadway, such as Zenda (1963), and Hot September (1965) and Lolita, My Love (1971). Some of these shows involved major Broadway talents, including Alan Jay Lerner, Frank Loesser, Jule Styne, Richard Maltby, Jr. and David Shire, and Jerry Bock and Sheldon Harnick. The most recent productions to attract the attention of Blue Pear Records were an off-Broadway revival of Cole Porter's You Never Know, which closed after only six performances in March 1973, and the original off-Broadway production of The Faggot by Al Carmines, which opened later that same year.

All of these LPs were issued with cover artwork that was based on the original poster or playbill logos, and with detailed and erudite liner notes attributed to Niles Marsh. It remains unclear, however, if this is the same Niles Marsh who was a leading female impersonator on the pre-Second World War vaudeville circuit. The LPs bear no dates, although internal evidence (e.g. clues contained in the liner notes) indicates that the bulk of them were released between 1983 and 1986. Starting with the re-pressing of the original Broadway cast recording for Drat! The Cat!, all of the Blue Pear LPs were given the additional designation “Limited Collectors' Edition” in a prominent location.

Amongst all of these 'original cast recordings', Blue Pear also issued an anthology entitled The Unknown Theatre Songs of Jule Styne, which comprised demonstration recordings of 22 songs that had either been cut from Styne's most famous shows (including Gypsy, Funny Girl and Subways Are For Sleeping) or had featured in lesser known productions such as Wonderworld and the 1976 revival of Hellzapoppin. A unique undertaking by Blue Pear was a solo LP devoted to Broadway and cabaret singer Dolores Gray, which included songs previously issued only on 78 rpm format, and others that had been performed on television programmes such as The Ed Sullivan Show and had never been released. Most of these songs had never been pressed on LP before.

Blue Pear Records also released at least one recording in EP format, containing instrumental music performed by David Rose and his Orchestra. One side comprised music that Rose himself had originally composed for the film Forbidden Planet (but which went unused when he was replaced on the project by Louis and Bebe Barron) while the other side has selections from the film score for The Swan, composed by Bronislaw Kaper.

== Re-releases ==
In the early 2000s, four of the Blue Pear recordings were re-released on compact disc: the original Broadway cast recordings of Hot Spot, Hot September, A Joyful Noise and Something More! In each case, the re-issues included bonus tracks such as cover versions of the songs by popular vocalists (including everyone from Frank Sinatra to Mae West) and previously unreleased composer's demonstration recordings. Blue Pear re-released under another name "DejaVu Records. These titles included "Zenda" and "Body Beautiful."

== List of releases ==
LPs

- [no number] Trek Bloopers: Rare Third Season Bloopers Never Heard Before
- BP1001: The Crystal Heart (original off-Broadway cast)
- BP1002: The Sap of Life (original off-Broadway cast)
- BP1003: Kittiwake Island (original off-Broadway cast)
- BP1004: Sing, Muse! (original off-Broadway cast)
- BP1005: Drat! The Cat! (original Broadway cast)
- BP1006: The Body Beautiful (original Broadway cast)
- BP1007: Zenda (original San Francisco cast)
- BP1008: The Faggot (original off-Broadway cast)
- BP1009: Lolita, My Love (original Boston cast)
- BP1010: Pleasures and Palaces/Look to the Lilies (studio recordings)
- BP1011: The Unknown Theatre Songs of Jule Styne
- BP1012: Hot September (original Boston cast)
- BP1013: Bet your Life (original London cast)/Beggar's Holiday (original Broadway cast)
- BP1014: Miss Dolores Gray: Legendary Star of Stage and Screen
- BP1015: You Never Know (1973 off-Broadway revival cast)
- BP1016: Oh Marry Me! (original off-Broadway cast)
- BP1017: King of the Whole Damn World! (original off-Broadway cast)
- BP1018: A Joyful Noise (original Broadway cast)
- BP1019: Four Television Musicals
- BP1020: Hot Spot (original Broadway cast)
- BP1021: Something More! (original Broadway cast)

EPs

- BP45-002: David Rose and His Orchestra play Forbidden Planet

CDs

- BP1012: Hot September (original Boston cast)
- BP1018: A Joyful Noise (original Broadway cast)
- BP1020: Hot Spot (original Broadway cast)
- BP1021: Something More! (original Broadway cast)
