= Monica Boyar =

American singer (1920 -2013)

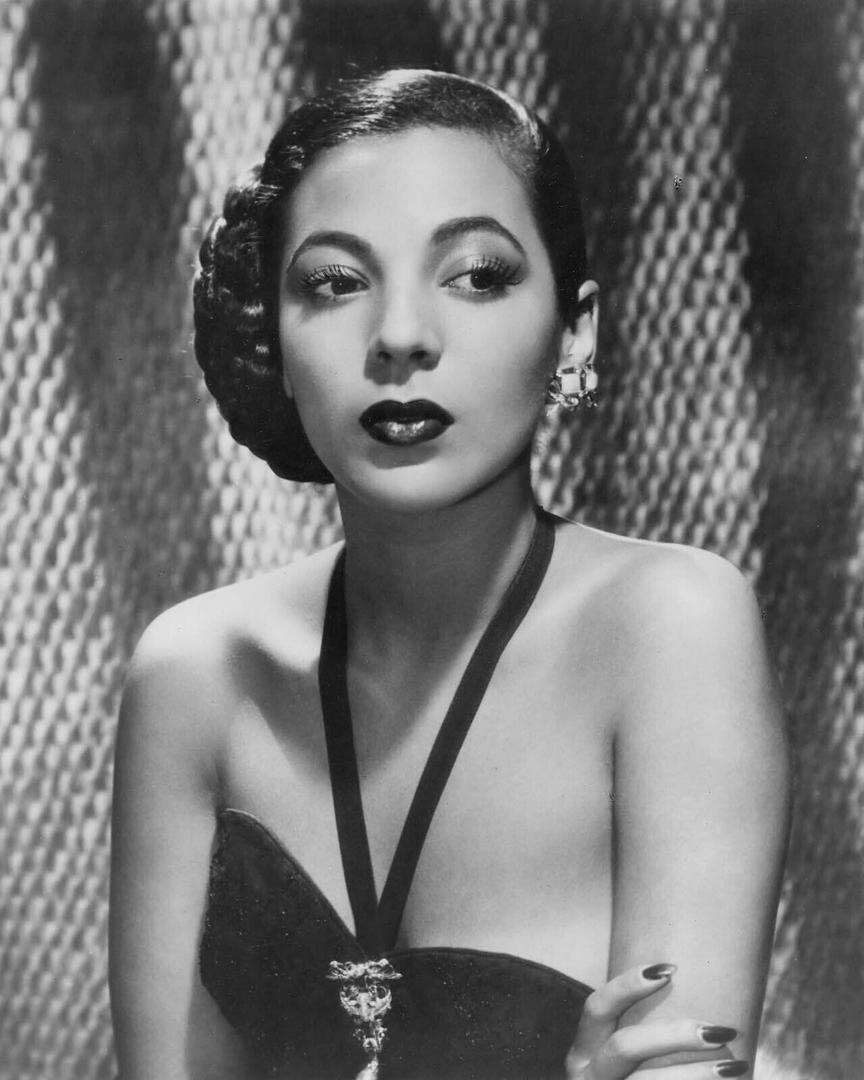
- Born: Argentina Mercedes, Argentina Mercedes González Morel Valerio Urea; December 20, 1920; Santa Cruz de Mao, Dominican Republic
- Died: October 2, 2013 (aged 92); Las Vegas, Nevada, United States
- Other name: Argentina Mercedes González Morel
- Occupations: Singer; actress; fashion designer
- Spouses: Federico Horacio Henríquez Vásquez (m. 1942; died 1949); Leslie Nielsen (m. 1950; div. 1956); Lee Tully (m. 1958; div. 1958)

Argentina Mercedes González Morel Valerio Urea (December 20, 1920 – October 2, 2013), commonly known as Monica Boyar, was a Dominican-born American nightclub singer, who was popular in the 1940s and 1950s for her calypso, and Afro-Cuban style songs. She was also an actress, primarily on stage; and a fashion designer, focused on celebrity outfits and costume design. She introduced merengue dance to the United States in 1939.

== Early life and family ==
Argentina Mercedes González Morel Valerio Urea was born on December 20, 1920, to parents Pablo González Valerio and Juanita Morel, in Mao, Dominican Republic. Some sources state she was born in Santiago de los Caballeros, Dominican Republic. In 1929, her family emigrated to the United States, and settled down in Manhattan, New York City. In childhood in the United States, she used the name "Argentina Morel".

Boyar became a United States citizen in 1947, after residing in the country from the age of six, although some records state it was at the age of eight. She was a dedicated student of the folk music of all countries. Boyar attended Manhattanville Junior High School #43, and Textile High School (now the Bayard Rustin Educational Complex) in Manhattan.

== Musical career ==
Starting at the age of twelve, she sang in the choral group at the Metropolitan Opera House. She was initially a soprano singing voice, but found that she disliked that and switched to a tenor, which was followed by a contralto in her later years.

During the 1939 New York World's Fair she made a concerted effort to persuade Americans to adopt the Dominican Republic's native dance, the merengue. She taught the dance to Arthur Murray during the 1939 event. An initial reluctance eventually subsided, and by 1955 it was the fastest growing dance in the U.S.

During World War II, she was active in charity shows for fundraising organizations, and participated in shows directed by President Franklin Delano Roosevelt.

When Boyar introduced calypso songs to America, many felt the music was not commercial. By 1954, calypso songs were among the bestsellers. She introduced a new song, That's Why A Woman Loves A Heel, in October 1945.

By 1948, Boyar had appeared on every overseas radio network. Boyar entertained at Ciro's in Mexico City and the Hotel Nacional in Havana. Among her numerous nightclub engagements was a December 1955 performance at the Viennese Lantern, at 242 East 79th Street in Yorkville, Manhattan. A lawsuit was taken out by an angry tenant who resided above the club. He contended that Boyar's bongo drummer kept him awake.

Walter Winchell, a gossip columnist, said that she was the finest Latin talent in the entertainment field in 1960.

== Clothing designer ==
Boyar was a fashion designer for stage and motion picture stars. Her designs were very original yet simple. She also created expensive handbags. She had over two hundred gowns to wear to performances in her New York City apartment.

== Acting career ==
Boyar appeared in the three-minute short film, Princess Papaya (1945). She played a singer in an episode of the American television show Mister Peepers, in 1952. In 1961 she received a Universal Pictures film studio screen test.

Boyar appeared in the Broadway production by Tennessee Williams, Summer and Smoke (1948), as the character "Rosa Gonzalez". She also starred as the Hawaiian wife named Emmaloa in the stage production of 13 Daughters (1961), a short-lived Broadway musical by Eaton Magoon Jr.

== Personal life and death ==
Her first husband was Federico Horacio "Gugu" Vásquez Henríquez. She was widowed when her husband was captured and executed after landing at Luperón, Puerto Plata in 1949 as part of a plot against Dominican dictator Rafael Trujillo.

Her second husband was actor Leslie Nielsen, from 1950 to 1956. They separated in August 1955, with Nielsen obtaining a default divorce in June 1956. He agreed to pay US $19,000 (roughly equivalent to $167,000 in 2024, with inflation) in lieu of alimony, by monthly installments of $500. She married comedian Lee Tully in March 1958, and divorced him in Mexico three months later. She never had any children.

Boyar was friends with Marlon Brando, who visited her when she was hospitalized at New York’s Lenox Hill Hospital, in January 1955.

She lived in Las Vegas, Nevada in late life, after her retirement. Boyar died on October 2, 2013, in Las Vegas, from complications due to stroke at age 92.
