= People (Barbra Streisand album) =

Studio album by Barbra Streisand
- Released: September 1964
- Recorded: December 20, 1963; July 24, 1964; August 4, 11, 21, 1964
- Studios: Columbia 7th Ave, New York City
- Genre: Traditional pop
- Length: 35:35
- Labels: Columbia; Stereo CS 9015; Mono CL 2215
- Producers: Robert Mersey; "People" produced by Mike Berniker

Barbra Streisand chronology
Funny Girl (Original Broadway Cast Recording) (1964)	People (1964)	My Name Is Barbra (1965)

People is Barbra Streisand's fourth solo studio album, released in September 1964. The title track was a newly recorded version of the hit song from the Broadway musical Funny Girl in which Streisand starred.

The album became the first of Streisand's albums to hit No. 1 on the Billboard album chart, spending five weeks in the top spot; it was also certified Platinum. After hitting No. 1 on the charts, Barbra received a commemorative plaque from Billboard magazine editor Mike Gross. The album was re-released in the UK on the CBS Hallmark Series label in 1966 with different artwork.

In 2017, the album was selected for preservation in the National Recording Registry by the Library of Congress as being "culturally, historically, or aesthetically significant".

== Artwork ==
The cover photo was taken by Don Bronstein at Chicago's Oak Street Beach in June 1963, when Streisand was in town for an engagement at Mister Kelly's nightclub.

== Critical reception ==
Professional ratings
Review scores
Source	Rating
Allmusic	4.5/5 stars
Record Mirror	5/5 stars

High Fidelity noted that the singer successfully navigated the challenge of transitioning from an artist who initially made an impact by being "deliberately different" to one whose authority could sustain repetition. The review stated that Streisand achieved this through her ability to invest material with a "strong, personal, and valid quality". The album's program was praised for its selection of "unusually good songs", and while the critic felt she could be "led astray by her emotionalism", as on a version of "Supper Time" that was deemed "overdone," her performance of "Fine and Dandy" was highlighted as a "magnificent example of strongly projected popular singing." The review concluded that Streisand had "no need of gimmicks, oddities, or other crutches", and that her skill made these "straight presentations just as brilliant" as her earlier, more unconventional work.

== Accolades ==
Streisand won the Best Vocal Performance, Female Grammy Award for this album, her second in this category. Grammy Awards were also won for Best Accompaniment/Arrangement for Vocalist or Instrumentalist (Peter Matz); and Best Album Cover (Robert Cato and Don Bronstein).

== Track listing ==
No.	Title	Writer(s)	Length
1.	"Absent-Minded Me"	Bob Merrill, Jule Styne	3:07
2.	"When in Rome (I Do as the Romans Do)"	Cy Coleman, Carolyn Leigh	2:57
3.	"Fine and Dandy"	Kay Swift, Paul James	2:49
4.	"Supper Time"	Irving Berlin	2:47
5.	"Will He Like Me?"	Jerry Bock, Sheldon Harnick	2:34
6.	"How Does the Wine Taste?"	Matt Dubey, Harold Karr	2:36
7.	"I'm All Smiles"	Michael Leonard, Herbert Martin	2:09
8.	"Autumn"	Richard Maltby, Jr., David Shire	1:57
9.	"My Lord and Master"	Oscar Hammerstein II, Richard Rodgers	2:59
10.	"Love Is a Bore"	Sammy Cahn, Jimmy Van Heusen	2:08
11.	"Don't Like Goodbyes"	Harold Arlen, Truman Capote	3:14
12.	"People"	Bob Merrill, Jule Styne	3:40

== 2002 reissue ==
Reissued 29 January 2002 with original album art restored and remastered from original master tapes by Stephen Marcussen in 2001. CDs released outside of the US and Canada include the bonus track "I Am Woman", previously issued on the B-side of the single "People".

== Song information ==
- "Fine and Dandy" was introduced in the musical Fine and Dandy (1930).
- "Supper Time" was introduced in the musical As Thousands Cheer by Ethel Waters.
- "Will He Like Me" was introduced in the musical She Loves Me.
- "My Lord and Master" was introduced in the musical The King and I.
- "People" is from the musical Funny Girl. This recording was produced by Mike Berniker and recorded on 20 December 1963 in New York.
- "I'm All Smiles" was introduced in the musical The Yearling.
- "Absent-Minded Me" was written for Funny Girl but was cut during rehearsals.
- "Don't Like Goodbyes" was introduced in the musical House of Flowers.

== Charts ==
=== Weekly charts ===
Chart	Peak position
US Billboard 200	1
US Pop LP's - Money Albums (Music Business)	1

=== Year-end charts ===
Chart (1965)	Position
US Cash Box	6

== Certifications ==
Region	Certification	Certified units/sales
United States (RIAA)	Platinum	1,000,000^{^}
^{^} Shipments figures based on certification alone.
