= My Name Is Barbra, Two... =

Studio album by Barbra Streisand
- Released: October 1965
- Studios: Studio A (New York, NY)
- Genres: Traditional pop, vocal
- Length: 36:38
- Label: Columbia
- Producer: Robert Mersey

Barbra Streisand chronology
My Name Is Barbra (1965)	My Name Is Barbra, Two... (1965)	Color Me Barbra (1966)

Singles from My Name Is Barbra, Two…
- 1. "He Touched Me" Released: September 1965; 2. "Second Hand Rose" Released: December 1965

Professional ratings
Review scores
Source	Rating
Allmusic	3/5 stars

My Name Is Barbra, Two... is the second of two studio album tie-ins by Barbra Streisand for her debut television special of the same name, which first aired April 28, 1965. The second album was released in October 1965 to coincide with the rebroadcast of the special on CBS.

The Medley (Track 11) is the only music from the television program, while the remaining tracks were newly recorded for the album.

== Promotion ==
Executives at Columbia planned a major advertising and promotion campaign, including full-page advertising in TV Guide and Esquire magazines, saturation radio spot in 30 major markets, retailers supplied with 38-inch die-cuts, streamers and pre-pack counter browsers and 800 transportation display locations with four-sheet posters to draw attention to both the new album and the rebroadcast of the highly acclaimed TV special.

== Commercial performance ==
The album was certified Platinum and peaked at #2 on the US charts and #6 in the UK charts.

== Track listing ==
Side One

1. "He Touched Me" (Ira Levin, Milton Schafer) – 3:10
2. "The Shadow of Your Smile (Love theme from The Sandpiper)" (Johnny Mandel, Paul Francis Webster) – 2:45
3. "Quiet Night" (Lorenz Hart, Richard Rodgers) – 2:25
4. "I Got Plenty of Nothin'" (George Gershwin, Ira Gershwin, DuBose Heyward) – 3:08
5. "How Much of the Dream Comes True" (John Barry, Trevor Peacock) – 3:05
6. "Second Hand Rose" (Grant Clarke, James F. Hanley) – 2:09

Side Two

1. "The Kind of Man a Woman Needs" (Michael Leonard, Herbert Martin) – 3:53
2. "All That I Want" (Francine Forest, Neil Wolfe) – 3:48
3. "Where's That Rainbow" (Lorenz Hart, Richard Rodgers) – 3:39
4. "No More Songs for Me" (Richard Maltby, Jr., David Shire) – 2:53
5. "Medley: Second Hand Rose/Give Me the Simple Life/I Got Plenty of Nothin'/Brother, Can You Spare a Dime?/Nobody Knows You When You're Down and Out/Second Hand Rose/The Best Things in Life Are Free" – 5:43

== Singles ==
The album had two singles chart: "He Touched Me" (US #53) and "Second Hand Rose" (US #32; Canada AC #1).

1. "He Touched Me" / "I Like Him" 1965
2. "Second Hand Rose" / "The Kind of Man a Woman Needs" 1965

== Charts ==
=== Weekly charts ===
Chart	Peak position
Australia Albums (Kent Music Report)	5
UK Albums (Official Charts)	6
US Billboard 200	2
US Cashbox Top Albums	1

=== Year-end charts ===
Chart (1966)	Position
US Cash Box	14

== Certifications ==
Region	Certification	Certified units/sales
United States (RIAA)	Platinum	1,000,000^{^}
^{^} Shipments figures based on certification alone.
