= People (Barbra Streisand song) =

Single by Barbra Streisand

from the album Funny Girl: Original Broadway Cast Recording and People
- A-side: "I Am Woman"
- Released: January 1964
- Recorded: December 20, 1963
- Studio: Columbia 30th Street (New York City)
- Length: 3:39
- Label: Columbia; 4-42965
- Songwriters: Jule Styne (music); Bob Merrill (lyrics)
- Producer: Mike Berniker

Barbra Streisand singles chronology
| "My Coloring Book" (1962) | "People" (1964) | "Absent Minded Me" (1964) |

"People" is a song composed by Jule Styne with lyrics by Bob Merrill for the 1964 Broadway musical Funny Girl starring Barbra Streisand, who introduced the song. The song was released as a single in 1964 with "I Am Woman", a solo version of "You Are Woman, I Am Man", also from Funny Girl.

Andy Williams released a version of the song on his 1964 album, The Great Songs from "My Fair Lady" and Other Broadway Hits. Ella Fitzgerald recorded the song live on her CBS release Newport Jazz Festival: Live at Carnegie Hall. The Tymes had a top 40 hit on the Billboard Hot 100 with the song in 1968. Vic Damone recorded a version on his 1982 album Over the Rainbow. It has been covered by Jennifer Lopez, Billy Eckstine, Dionne Warwick, Steve Lawrence, Jack Jones, Aretha Franklin, Nat King Cole, Wes Montgomery, Gabor Szabo, Perry Como, The Supremes and others, but is considered one of Streisand's signature songs.

In 1998, Streisand's version was inducted in Grammy Hall of Fame. In 2004, Streisand's version on the soundtrack of Funny Girl finished at #13 on AFI's 100 Years...100 Songs survey of top tunes in American cinema.

== Origins ==
"People" was one of the first songs written for the musical score of Funny Girl, which is based on the life and career of Broadway and film star and comedian Fanny Brice and her stormy relationship with entrepreneur and gambler Nicky Arnstein.

Composer Jule Styne and lyricist Bob Merrill were hired to write the musical score and met each other for the first time in 1962 in Palm Beach, Florida. They wrote their songs by day and tested them by night on the Palm Beach socialites at cocktail parties.

As they worked to develop the character of Fanny Brice, they needed to write a special love song depicting her feelings towards Nicky Arnstein. According to the book, Jule: The Story of Composer Jule Styne by Theodore Taylor,

Jule turned to his collaborator Bob Merrill, "You told me the other night to work on [the lyric] 'a very special person'. I think I've got a helluva melody for it." [...] "Great," Merrill yelled. "But now it's not gonna be just a 'special person'. Listen." Then he ad-libbed, while Jule played the melody again: "People, people who need people, are the luckiest people in the world" [...] The song "wrote" in thirty minutes [...] "People" nearly did not get included in Funny Girl during early try-outs as the producers did not like it. Bob fought to keep the song in and finally one night, Barbra was allowed to sing it on stage. It stopped the show and history was made.

The single by Streisand was released in January 1964, and peaked at number five on the Billboard pop chart, becoming the singer's first Top 40 hit. It also spent three weeks at number one on the Pop-Standards (easy listening) chart in June/July 1964. This helped to cement its inclusion in Funny Girl, which ran on Broadway from March 26, 1964, to July 1, 1967, and earned Styne and Merrill a nomination for a 1964 Tony Award as Best Composer and Lyricist at the 18th Tony Awards. The single version was recorded on 20 December 1963 and produced by Mike Berniker.

Streisand included a revised version of the song on Partners, her 2014 album of duets. On the song, she duets with soul singer Stevie Wonder, who had performed it at the 2011 MusiCares Person of the Year gala event honoring Streisand.

It has been said that People was originally written for the animated television special Mister Magoo's Christmas Carol, but Theodore Taylor's biography of Styne disputes this.

== Official versions by Streisand ==
Streisand recorded the song in the following studio projects:

- "People" (Funny Girl Original Broadway Cast Recording)
- "People" (People Album Version) / (Single Version) / (Second Recorded Take)
- "People" (Funny Girl Original Soundtrack Album Recording)
- "People" (Partners Album Version Duet with Stevie Wonder)

The song also appears, often in a live version, in other 8 albums:

1. A Happening in Central Park (1968)
2. Live Concert at the Forum (1972)
3. Barbra Streisand...and Other Musical Instruments (1973)
4. One Voice (1987)
5. The Concert (1994)
6. Timeless: Live in Concert (2000)
7. Live in Concert 2006 (2007)
8. Back to Brooklyn (2013)

and, as previously released material, "People" appears in some of Streisand retrospective/greatest hits albums, like Barbra Streisand's Greatest Hits, (1970), Just for the Record... (1991) and The Essential Barbra Streisand (2002).

== Chart ==
Chart performance for "People"
| Chart (1964) | Peak position |
|---|---|
| Australia (Kent Music Report) | 20 |
| Canada Top Singles (RPM) | 30 |
| Italian Albums (Musica e dischi) | 25 |
| Netherlands (Dutch Top 40) | 30 |
| US Billboard Hot 100 | 5 |
| US Adult Contemporary (Billboard) | 1 |

== Supremes version ==
While the song is considered a signature tune for Streisand, during the mid-1960s, it was also associated with Florence Ballard of the Supremes. A regular part of the Supremes' nightclub appearances, the Supremes' version of "People" has more of a jazz flavor than Streisand's version, and was essentially a group effort, performed in three-part harmony with Ballard on the lead vocal and Diana Ross leading the song's bridge. Notably, it is also one of the few songs on which Ballard sang lead vocals after the Supremes achieved commercial success, since Motown head Berry Gordy favored Ross.

The Supremes recorded a studio version of "People" for the unreleased 1965 album, There's a Place for Us, which was finally released on The Supremes box set in 2000. When the group performed at the Copacabana nightclub in 1965, from which their live album The Supremes at the Copa was taken, the song was not included in the set. However, the tune remained in the group's live set until 1966, with Ballard retaining the lead. Eventually, Mary Wilson took the bridge previously sung by Ross, making it a rare duet between Ballard and Wilson. This version was finally released in 2012 on the expanded edition of I Hear A Symphony, from the cancelled 1966 live album, Live at The Roostertail. The song became a Ross solo after Ballard's departure from the group.

== See also ==
- List of number-one adult contemporary singles of 1964 (U.S.)
