= 13 Daughters =

Musical by Eaton Magoon Jr.

13 Daughters was a short-lived Broadway musical with book, music and lyrics by Eaton Magoon, Jr., starring Don Ameche. It played for 28 performances in 1961. The story was influenced by the life of Magoon's great-grandparents Chun Afong and his wife Julia Fayerweather Afong and their twelve daughters.

== Plot ==
Set in 19th-century Hawaii, the plot involves a Chinese merchant, Chun, and a Hawaiian princess, Emmaloa, who wed and have 13 daughters. A prophecy predicts the daughters will not be married until the couple's 13 calabash trees bloom. Tradition dictates the oldest daughter must be the first to marry, but she is more interested in missionary work and no tree has yet blossomed. Soon the daughters' luck will change, however, despite the prophecy.

== Productions ==
After a month-long tryout in Philadelphia and one preview on Broadway, 13 Daughters opened on March 2, 1961, at the 54th Street Theatre in New York, and closed on March 25, 1961, after 28 performances. The large cast included Don Ameche as Chun, Monica Boyar as Emmaloa, Sylvia Syms, Richard Tone, Stanley Grover, George Lipton, Gina Viglione, John Battles, Isabelle Farrell, Diana Corto, Ed Kenney, and many others.

Billy Matthews directed and Rod Alexander was the choreographer.

The show was nominated for two Tony Awards, for Pembroke Davenport for Conductor and Musical Director, and George Jenkins for Scenic Designer (Musical). A cast album of a follow-up production in Honolulu was recorded on Mahalo Records.

Prior to the opening, Gloria Gabriel, who portrayed one of the daughters, appeared on an episode of To Tell The Truth as an imposter, where Don Ameche was a panelist, noting that she had not yet met Ameche.

There was a performance in New Zealand in April 1968 by the Hamilton Operatic Society followed two decades later by a revival concert production in 1987 at McKinley High School Auditorium, Honolulu. In 1989 a fully staged production was mounted with Joe Layton as director/choreographer, at the Hawaii Theatre, Honolulu. Arrangements for the Honolulu revival were commissioned from Derek Williams who was also the musical director, arranger/orchestrator for the 1981 world premiere and 1985 revival production of Magoon's later work, Aloha, a Musical of the Islands.
