= Dion McGregor =

American musician

Dion McGregor (1922–1994) was an American songwriter known for talking in his sleep. He was born in New York City. An LP of his dream diatribes—The Dream World Of Dion McGregor (He Talks In His Sleep)—was released to minor acclaim by Decca Records in 1964. A book of the same name, containing the transcripts of a wider selection of McGregor's dreams, and with illustrations by Edward Gorey, was also published in 1964.

McGregor would essentially narrate his dreams at conversational volume. As a narrator of his (often terrifying) dreams, Dion adopted various personas but frequently established a fey, argumentative, even approach to the subject at hand – be it a hot air balloon trip to the moon with a group of multi-ethnic children, a frantic journey around New York, or a tattooing job on a woman's tongue.

As a songwriter, McGregor's biggest success came when his song "Where Is The Wonder" (cowritten with roommate Michael Barr) was recorded by Barbra Streisand on her hit album My Name Is Barbra (1965). He was unable to find much success afterwards, however, and by the 1980s had given up on songwriting. Critic Joslyn Layne writes that "Despite his lack of success as a song lyricist, McGregor's narration of his vivid dreamlife provided a more unique artistic contribution than any usually recorded."

McGregor died in 1994, but researcher Phil Milstein gathered recordings of McGregor's dream-speech considered too risque to be released in the 1960s and assembled them for the 1999 album, Dion McGregor Dreams Again, released on Tzadik Records. A third album, The Further Somniloquies of Dion McGregor: More Outrageous Recordings of the World's Most Renowned Sleeptalker was assembled by Toronto poet Steve Venright and released in August 2004 on the Torpor Vigil Industries label. A previously unreleased recording, "Naughty Pussy", was released in April 2011 as part of Awkwardcore Compilation #1 on the Awkwardcore Records label. A fourth album was released in July 2014, again assembled by Venright for Torpor Vigil, called Dreaming Like Mad with Dion McGregor: Yet More Outrageous Recordings of the World's Most Renowned Sleeptalker.

Another of his roommates in the 1960s was filmmaker and fellow Edward Gorey enthusiast Peter de Rome. McGregor appears in de Rome's film "Mumbo Jumbo" (1971).

In 2017 Verena Paravel and Lucien Castaing-Taylor made an experimental documentary film about McGregor's dreams called Somniloquies. It was accepted by several renowned film festivals including Berlinale, Karlovy Vary International Film Festival, and IndieLisboa International Independent Film Festival.

== Book ==
- The Dream World Of Dion McGregor (1964, Bernard Geis Associates; distributed by Random House)
