= Lolita, My Love =

Musical

- Unreleased Cast Album
- Music: John Barry
- Lyrics: Alan Jay Lerner
- Book: Alan Jay Lerner
- Basis: Vladimir Nabokov's novel Lolita
- Productions: 1971 Philadelphia; 1971 Boston never opened on Broadway

Lolita, My Love was an unsuccessful musical by John Barry and Alan Jay Lerner, based on Vladimir Nabokov's 1955 novel Lolita. It closed in Boston in 1971 while on a tour prior to Broadway.

== Production history ==
Lolita, My Love was initiated by Lerner, the well-known lyricist of My Fair Lady and other major hits, who recruited Barry to write the score. Nabokov, who had several times refused to allow adaptations of his novel, stated that "Mr. Lerner is a most talented and excellent classicist. If you have to make a musical version of Lolita, he is the one to do it." Like most musicals of the time, the production was scheduled for a multi-city "tryout" tour, during which rewrites could be done as needed, before opening on Broadway. The original director was opera impresario Tito Capobianco, and choreography was provided by Jack Cole, although Cole was fired during rehearsals and replaced by Danny Daniels. Lorna Luft was cast as supporting character Mona in what would have been her Broadway debut but was fired during rehearsals without an explanation.

Upon opening in Philadelphia on February 16, 1971, the show got savage reviews and immediately closed for more work. Capobianco was fired and replaced by Noel Willman, and Daniels was replaced as choreographer by Dan Siretta. Even Annette Ferra, the actress playing Lolita, was replaced.

The show reopened in Boston but did lukewarm business and received mixed reviews, although critics acknowledged good performances by John Neville as Humbert and Dorothy Loudon as Lolita's vulgar mother, Charlotte, and found the music and lyrics strong. Lolita was played by Denise Nickerson, and Leonard Frey was Clare Quilty. The production closed before its scheduled opening at the Mark Hellinger Theatre, the site of many previous Lerner triumphs; it lost $900,000.

The show was revived in a Musicals in Mufti staged reading at the York Theatre Company in New York in March 2019 as adapted from several of Lerner's drafts by Erik Haagensen and with a score recovered and directed by Deniz Cordell.

== Synopsis ==
=== Act I ===
Clare Quilty, a famous playwright, is having a party, celebrating a life of debauchery and sexual freedom (“Going, Going, Gone”). Humbert Humbert storms in, demanding to know where Lolita is. He accuses Quilty of stealing her “2 years, 10 months, and 4 days ago”, when she disappeared from his life. At first, Quilty protests ignorance, but cannot contain himself from laughing at Humbert. Humbert demands information from him, even threatening to shoot him, but Quilty will not budge, despite protests from his other partygoers. Finally, Humbert shoots and kills Quilty. In a monologue to the audience, he reflects that he has been a teacher for the past 18 years of his life, and seeks to answer how it is possible that he could commit murder. Upon reflection, he confesses that he has a “delirious, yet monstrous” aspect of his personality. After teaching at a girls’ school from Switzerland, and having a nervous breakdown, he decides to start a new life in America giving lectures to the Adult Education Group.

He arrives to stay at the Haze household in the fictional town of Ramsdale, Vermont. There, Charlotte Haze and her daughter Dolores, aka Lolita, have a strained relationship (“The Same Old Song”). Humbert is initially disgusted by Charlotte's faux-European taste, looking for the first opportunity to leave, until he sees Lolita. He agrees to stay without even hearing the price. He offers to help tutor Lolita, who is struggling in school; she, however, is not interested in doing any work on the weekend (“Saturday”). She finds Humbert writing in his diary and tells her that Charlotte is in love with him. He shows her a picture of a young girl that looks oddly like her. Humbert explains that she is Anabell, a young girl that he was in love with years ago (“In the Broken-Promise Land of Fifteen”). Charlotte insists that Lolita not bother Humbert, which sets off another fight, and increases Humbert's distaste for Charlotte (“The Same Old Song (Reprise)”).

Charlotte tries to spend time with Humbert and flatter him by talking about how much she and the Adult Education Group are looking forward to his lecture on poets. He explains that he will be lecturing on Dante Alighieri, Petrarch, and Edgar Allan Poe, all of whom had fixations on prepubescent girls. Charlotte invites the group over for a picnic the following weekend, where he explains to them the poets’ inspiration: nymphets (“Dante, Petrarch, and Poe”). At the picnic, Quilty arrives and is praised for his most recent television play. He asks about Lolita (whom he has never met), and finds Humbert strange. Later, Charlotte reflects on her love for France, how she has attempted to make her own version of it here in Ramsdale, and her dream for a better life (“Sur Les Quais”). While Charlotte is dancing with Humbert, Lolita returns home unexpectedly, and Humbert dotes on her. Charlotte decides to send Lolita away to summer camp: Camp Climax.

Humbert is devastated when Charlotte takes Lolita to camp. However, he is even more disturbed by a letter that Charlotte leaves him, confessing her love for him and asking him to either marry her or leave (“Charlotte’s Letter”). Initially, he is disgusted, but then he thinks about the prospect of being Lolita's step-father. They are married shortly thereafter. Charlotte chastises Humbert for sending Lolita candy while she is away. He imagines not only standing up to Charlotte, but also killing her because he cannot bear the thought of being stuck with her; however, he realizes that he does not have the stomach to kill her, and that his dream of being rid of her will not be (“Farewell, Little Dream”). Charlotte admits that Lolita will not be coming home, and going right to boarding school. Humbert stands up to her, and she gives in. Charlotte finds Humbert's journal, in which he has written about how much he loves Lolita, and hates Charlotte. He attempts to play it off as a draft of a novel, but she doesn't believe him, and runs out of the house. A neighbor arrives to inform Humbert that Charlotte has been hit and killed by a car. He relishes in his newfound fortune, phoning the camp to say he will collect Lolita. Then, he calls and makes a reservation at a hotel for that night. Humbert is elated as he leaves to get Lolita (“Hello, Little Dream”).

=== Act II ===
Humbert and Lolita arrive at the seedy Bed-D-By Motel, where Quilty and his entourage are also staying (“At the Bed-D-By Motel”). Lolita teases Humbert about them having to share a bed. Quilty calls their room and torments Humbert. Humbert tells Lolita that she can do anything she wants and that he will give her anything she wants (“Tell Me, Tell Me”). In the middle of the night, after they have had sex, Humbert recounts that Lolita had had sex with a boy at camp, which lessened his guilt. She calls him disgusting, and threatens to call her mother and tell her what they've done. Finally, he tells her that Charlotte is dead, and she accuses him of lying to Charlotte to get to her. Ultimately, she makes him promise that he will never leave her.

The two of them relocate to Beardsley School for Girls, where Humbert gets a teaching job and Lolita attends the 8th grade ("Buckin’ for Beardsley/Beardsley School for Girls”). Lolita is angry with Humbert for not allowing her to star in the school play. The Headmistress meets with Humbert to express her concerns about Lolita: that she has not been properly educated about sex, and needs more social interaction with her peers. She presents Humbert with an ultimatum: either he and Lolita attend group therapy, or he allows Lolita to participate in the school play written by Quilty. Humbert agrees to the latter. During rehearsal, Quilty meets Lolita and becomes fascinated with her; he admits that his uncle, a dentist and friend of Charlotte's, told him she was at school. Quilty decides to break off his relationship with his partner after meeting Lolita (“March Out of My Life”). Meanwhile, Humbert has become increasingly paranoid about Lolita's absence from home, and confronts her (“The Same Old Song (Reprise)”). Lolita protests innocence, and her friend Phyllis corroborates her story, but Humbert doesn't believe her. Lolita accuses Humbert of keeping her locked up under the guise of loving her (“All You Can Do Is Tell Me You Love Me”).

Humbert realizes that the two of them have to get away. Lolita does not want them to fight anymore, and asks for them to leave that night and take a road trip, as long as she can choose the stops along the way (“How Far Is It to the Next Town?”). During this sequence, the two of them travel across the country, but are ruthlessly pursued by a mysterious red Mercedes. At each stop, Humbert grows increasingly suspicious of Lolita's disappearance and the persistence of the red car. Finally, Lolita disappears completely, leaving Humbert distraught. He searches for her for over 2 years, but finds no trace of her; he wants nothing more than to have her back (“Lolita”). Finally, he runs into Phyllis, who tells him that Lolita ran off with Quilty. He is outraged and arrives at Quilty's house (which brings us back to the beginning of Act I) and shoots him. Then, he arrives at Lolita's house to find her married and pregnant. He begs her to come with him and she refuses. He gives her $15,000 for her and her husband to relocate to Alaska. The police arrive and arrest Humbert for killing Quilty. He reflects that, above all else, he wants her to be happy, and wonders if, only now, he loves her for the first time.

== The show ==
Like the novel, Lolita, My Love focused on a European-born professor, Humbert Humbert, who lives in the U.S.; he foolishly falls in love with his landlady's teenaged daughter. While the plot is unpleasant, Humbert eventually emerges as a near-tragic figure, and there is much witty explication of the American culture that both encourages and condemns such behavior.

While the show was not officially recorded, a recording from the theater sound board surfaced in 1987, and was released on the Blue Pear Records label (BP 1009). A track listing on the recording gives the following list of songs:

1. Overture
2. Going, Going, Gone – Quilty and Guests
3. The Same Old Song – Lolita & Charlotte
4. Saturday – Lolita
5. In the Broken Promise Land of 15 – Humbert
6. The Same Old Song (Reprise) – Humbert, Lolita, Charlotte
7. Dante, Petrarch and Poe – Humbert, Charlotte, Ensemble
8. Sur Les Quais – Charlotte
9. Charlotte's Letter – Humbert & Charlotte
10. Farewell, Little Dream – Humbert
11. At the Bed-D-By Motel – Ensemble
12. Tell Me, Tell Me – Humbert
13. Buckin' for Beardsley/Beardsley School for Girls – Ensemble
14. March Out of My Life - Quilty
15. The Same Old Song (Reprise); Lolita
16. All You Can Do Is Tell Me You Love Me – Lolita
17. How Far Is It to the Next Town – Lolita & Humbert
18. How Far is It to the Next Town (Reprise) – Quilty & Humbert
19. Lolita – Humbert
20. Finale

"Going, Going, Gone" was recorded by Shirley Bassey, and "In the Broken-Promise Land of Fifteen" has been recorded several times, notably by Robert Goulet. Andre Kostelanetz included an instrumental version of the title song on his 1971 album, For All We Know.

== Reactions ==
In refusing many previous offers to adapt the novel, Nabokov insisted that the distasteful plot was acceptable because it existed only in his head; to make a real twelve-year-old girl play the part, on stage night after night, "would be sinful and immoral." The skeletal plot alone, without Nabokov's authorial voice, is indeed quite salacious, and critics and audiences reacted negatively to it.

Subsequent writers (notably Ken Mandelbaum and Frank Rich) have found elements of the show worthy of praise, with Mandelbaum contending that it is unlikely anyone could produce a better musical version of what is probably fundamentally impossible material. In 1982, a non-musical adaptation of Lolita by Edward Albee opened to memorably negative reviews, and many critics specifically pointed out ways in which this version was lacking when compared to the earlier musical; Rich contended that Albee's version had a hideous set, pointing out that even the "flop musical version...got the scenery right."

== See also ==
- Edward Albee's Lolita (play)
- Rodion Shchedrin's Lolita (opera)
