= John Battles =

American singer (1921-2009)

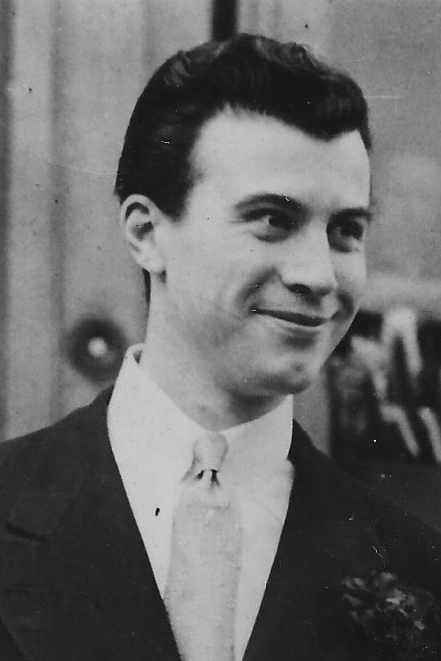
- Battles in 1949
- Born: Francis Xavier Joseph Tuohy; August 10, 1921; New York, New York
- Died: September 22, 2009 (aged 88); Fredericksburg, Texas
- Occupation: Theater actor
- Years active: 1944–1962
- Known for: Starred in the original Broadway productions of "On The Town" and "Allegro"
- Spouse: Jane Anderson (m. 1949)
- Children: Catherine

John Battles (August 10, 1921 – September 22, 2009) was a musical and dramatic theater actor and a native of New York City. Battles's breakout role and career highlight came in 1944 as Gabey in the original Broadway production of the hit musical comedy On the Town. In 1947, he debuted as the lead (Joseph Taylor, Jr.) in Rodgers and Hammerstein's Allegro. He last starred in 13 Daughters in 1961.

== Early theater experience ==
Battles, born Francis Tuohy in Manhattan and raised in Rutland, Vermont, had his early experience in theater with the Woodstock Players in Woodstock, Vermont, the Germantown Theatre Guild in Philadelphia, and the Irvine Studio for the Theatre in New York, before making his professional debut.

His first role on Broadway was as a chorus member in Cole Porter's Something for the Boys, starring Ethel Merman. Battles converted his place in the chorus into a small featured part, the M.P., before moving on to Follow the Girls starring Jackie Gleason and featuring a young Danny Aiello as the Dancing Boy. Battles played the Yokel Sailor and understudied one of the male leads before resigning from the production when he was offered the role of Gabey in On the Town.

== Broadway stardom ==
=== On the Town ===
On the Town opened on Broadway at the Adelphi Theater on Dec. 28th, 1944. It moved briefly to the 44th Street Theater on June 4, 1945, and finally to the Martin Beck Theater on July 30, 1945, before closing on Feb. 2nd, 1946 after a run of 462 performances. Battles stayed with the production for the entirety of the run, missing two periods due to illness and vacation break when understudy Marten Sameth stepped into his role.

After closing on Broadway, On the Town opened (without Mr. Battles) as a touring production two days later in Baltimore on February 4 and in 1949 a film version of On the Town was produced by MGM with Gene Kelly starring in the role originated by Battles. MGM was a financial backer of On the Town and before its stage debut paid a $100,000 deposit towards securing the screen rights.

In addition to giving Battles his career making role, On the Town was the first Broadway success for a quartet of American theater legends: composer and conductor Leonard Bernstein, choreographer Jerome Robbins, and actors and book and lyric writers Adolph Green and Betty Comden.

New York reviews for the show were mixed, but mostly favorable. Lewis Nichols in The New York Times said it was "the freshest and most engaging musical to come this way since the golden day of Oklahoma!". Louis Kronenberger of the New York newspaper PM concurred by calling it "much the best musical of the year". The show's detractors included John Chapman of the New York Daily News, who dismissed it as "a dullish musical comedy". Occupying the middle ground between the extremes was Burton Rascoe of the New York World Telegram who offered merely that "if you are not too exacting it is pretty good fun".

Battles's role as Gabey put him at the heart of the matter in On the Town as one of the trio of sailors the show follows over a 24-hour period of leave in New York City. As Gabey, Battles featured in the singing of six of the show's songs: "New York, New York", "Lonely Town", "Lucky to be Me", "Subway Ride", "Imaginary Coney Island", and the show ending reprise of "New York, New York".

Mentions of Battles in the reviews, as for cast members generally, were brief but approving. From Howard Barnes of the New York Herald Tribune: "Battles comes through with 'Lonely Town' and 'Lucky To Be Me'." From Wilella Waldorf of the New York Post: "John Battles as the lovelorn gob is an engaging youth". Robert Garland of the New York Journal American, while ruefully less than enthused about the show, echoed Barnes of the Herald Tribune and included Battles's singing on "Lonely Town" and "Lucky To Be Me" among features to recommend the show.

=== Allegro ===
If On the Town heralded the arrival of new legends on Broadway, Battles' next role, the male lead in the new musical Allegro from Richard Rodgers and Oscar Hammerstein II, was an engagement with legends already established.

Rodgers and Hammerstein had already between them nearly six decades Broadway triumph and in their first collaboration, Oklahoma!, created a hit (even at that moment in the midst of a stunning performance run of 2,212 shows).

Rodgers and Hammerstein's producing partners for Allegro, Lawrence Langer and Theresa Helburn of the Theatre Guild, were equally distinguished. The Guild's producing credits stretched back to 1919 and included original Broadway productions of works by Eugene O'Neill, Ferenc Molnár, George Bernard Shaw, and George Gershwin. Langer and Helburn's previous collaborations with Rodgers and Hammerstein were several and included Oklahoma! and the now revered Carousel.

The debut of Allegro was avidly awaited. Richard Watts, Jr. of the New York Post called it "the most strenuously anticipated musical show of the post-war era" and advance ticket sales for Allegro were reported as unprecedented by longtime New York Times theater reporter Sam Zolotow.

Battles's role as Allegro's protagonist Joseph Taylor, Jr. was apparently among the first to be cast. On July 4, 1947, Zolotow reported in the Times that as of that date "only John Battles and John Conte are definite for the cast".

As such, Battles joined yet another American theater luminary already attached to the project. Agnes de Mille, niece of Hollywood film producing and directing titan Cecil B. DeMille, was on board as director in addition to her accustomed role as choreographer. Agnes de Mille had previously choreographed the original Broadway productions of Rodgers and Hammerstein's Oklahoma! and Carousel and was fresh off her Tony winning success with Alan Jay Lerner and Frederick Loewe's Brigadoon.

Allegro opened on Broadway at the Majestic Theatre on October 10, 1947. It ran until July 10, 1948, for a total of 315 performances. Battles performed in his role for the entirety of the run.

Allegro centers on the first 35 years of the unremarkable life and times of Joseph Taylor, Jr., the character played by Battles. Several critics likened the unpretentious tale of this musical play to Thornton Wilder's iconic drama of everyday small-town American life Our Town.

New York reviews for Allegro were largely favorable and those nearly reverent. Brooks Atkinson of The New York Times called it "a work of great beauty and purity" and stated that Rodgers and Hammerstein had only "just missed the final splendor of a perfect work of art". Ward Morehouse, writing in The Sun, called it a "musical play of beauty and dignity" and ranked it alongside Rodgers and Hammerstein's masterworks Oklahoma! and Carousel as "a theatrical piece of taste, imagination, and showmanship". Not to be outdone, Robert Coleman in the Daily Mirror called it perfection.

The few negative reviews for Allegro expressed a profoundly different view. Louis Kronenberger, in the New York newspaper PM, called it a grave disappointment that could be called an out-and-out failure and stated that the strange thing about Allegro was "not that it's bad but that it's boring". William Hawkins in the New York World Telegram echoed such sentiments, calling Allegro a vast disappointment.

The New York critics' reaction to Battles's performance in Allegro was generally positive. Howard Barnes in the New York Herald Tribune opined that "John Battles is perfect as the hero". Ward Morehouse in The Sun called Battles "an affecting Joe Taylor - forthright, bewildered, and believable". Even the New York newspaper PM's severely disappointed Louis Kronenberger allowed that Battles was a likable Joe Taylor. It was only William Hawkins in the New York World Telegram who sounded a sour note in calling the cast (with two noted exceptions, not including Battles) simply colorless.

== Engagements abroad ==
The end of the nine-month run of Allegro marked a five-year-long period of heavy activity on Broadway for Battles and at this point he took a break from performing on its stages to pursue acting opportunities abroad. Battles turned down several Broadway offers in 1948 and accepted instead a contract for the 1948 season from the Gate Theatre of Dublin, Ireland.

The Gate Theatre was formed in Dublin in 1928 by the Irish actors and theatrical producing team of Hilton Edwards and Michael MacLiammoir, also a playwright. The Gate gave Orson Welles and James Mason their professional acting debuts in 1931 and 1935, respectively.

Before his departure for Ireland, Battles spoke with Louis Calta of The New York Times. Battles called the Gate one of the finest repertory companies in the world and expressed his regard for Edwards and MacLiammoir as great teachers.

=== Abdication ===
Battles' first performance with the Gate came in H.T. Lowe-Porter's Abdication, which opened at the Gaiety Theatre in Dublin on September 27, 1948. His role as the Second Duke was minor and he is little mentioned in reviews. Gate founders Edwards and MacLiammoir both took parts, the latter the lead role of the Prince, with Edwards wearing also the hat of director.

Abdication debuted to much anticipation. It was a world premiere by a non-Irish playwright, at the time something of a novelty in Ireland, and the play was perceived to portray the unprecedented abdication in 1936 of England's King Edward VIII, this still quite fresh in people's minds.

Lowe-Porter, known widely then as the authorized English translator for famed German writer Thomas Mann, was quoted at the time saying that "the parallel between this chronicle play and the facts of Edward VIII's abdication are incidental". Others saw it quite differently. A reporter for the Manchester Daily Mail said "only the flimsiest of veils separates the stage show from the historic events in England in 1936". The Cork Examiner called the play's Elizabethan-era setting a slight disguise which at times wears off altogether. It is worth noting that Porter-Lowe was reported at the time as being a close friend of the Duchess of Windsor - the former Wallis Simpson and the very woman at the center of King Edward's abdication.

Abdication proved popular with both critics and ticket buyers. The Manchester Daily Mail called it a brilliant verse play and noted that the audience cheered and wildly applauded. The Cork Examiner also noted an enthusiastic reception from the audience and deemed the show a spectacular production. The Sunday Independent called it a skillfully staged and produced drama.

Such success was enough for the Gate to hold Abdication over for additional performances. Significantly, this left time enough only for a two show season whereas three shows had initially been planned for the six-week season of Autumn 1948.

=== The Mountains Look Different ===
This second show, The Mountains Look Different, received its world premiere at the Gaiety on October 25, 1948, and ran for the two-week remainder of the Gate's six-week home season in Dublin. Immediately following, Battles and company moved to the Citizens Theatre of Glasgow, where the Gate began a four-week Scottish season.

Like its predecessor, some controversy greeted this new play from Gate co-founder MacLiammor.

The Mountains Look Different centers on a young Irish woman, played in this production by British stage and screen veteran Sheila Burrell, trying to leave behind a past that includes a turn as a prostitute in London. Upon return to her native west of Ireland with her husband-to-be, she meets up with her past in the form of her fiancé's father, a former customer.

These circumstances and themes as MacLiammoir related to them engendered hostile reactions from critics and audiences in both Ireland and Scotland. Several in-theater disruptions of the show were reported, letters to the editor in newspapers voiced indignant disgust, and professional reviewers variously dismissed the play as "a sordid and unpleasant piece", and effort expended "on a subject that proves nothing, teaches nothing and is scarcely palatable entertainment".

On balance, however, reaction to the play in both venues was mixed. The Evening Mail critic called it a powerful play that "put a spell on the audience" and Gabriel Fallon writing in The Standard called it MacLiammoir's greatest play and "a work within a stone's throw of great tragedy".

Critical reactions to the actors' performances were generally positive, even where the play itself was dismissed or castigated. "Those Irish can act" ran the headline in the Scottish Daily Express. "First-Rate Acting" echoed the headline in The Bulletin.

Battles shared in the critical plaudits. The Standard's Fallon noted his performance as outstanding; the Evening Herald critic lauded him for compelling playing; the Irish Times writer chimed in, stating that "John Battles produced some impressively tragic miming". The Times Pictorial also weighed in positively, if ambivalently, for Battles stating that while "John Battles miming as the sinister fool is good ... the part seems to have included only for effect".

=== Belinda Fair ===
Springtime of 1949 found Battles engaged in London as the male lead in the new musical romance Belinda Fair. Produced at the Saville Theatre and written by Eric Maschwitz and Gilbert Lennox with music by Jack Strachey, it opened on March 25, 1949. It transferred to the Strand Theatre on June 20 and closed July 16 after 131 performances.

Belinda Fair received a tepid critical response. The Sunday Times critic assessed the show as "equally compounded of period dresses, romantic cliches, and vulgarity", while suggesting that it would be immensely popular. Anthony Cookman in The Tattler confessed to a mild beguilement but wrote that the show's humor was "a dead horse flogged without mercy". The Times ventured somewhat more positively that "While nobody would call it an original musical comedy the scenes all have the familiar freshness that springs from an uncondescending invention".

Battles's own notices as romantic lead Colonel Miles O'Malley in the production were similarly ambivalent. He was noted as handsome, playing up gallantly, and acting and singing sympathetically.

=== The Rank Organization ===
In reporting on Mr. Battles 1948 departure from the U.S. for European stages, Louis Calta of The New York Times noted that while in Europe Battles would do a film for the Rank Organization.

Rank, founded in 1937 by English industrialist J. Arthur Rank, was by 1948 a major player in British cinema, owning five film production studios and hundreds of cinema houses, and employing directing talents such as Michael Powell, Emeric Pressburger, and David Lean. Several of Rank's films from the 1940s, including The Red Shoes, A Matter of Life and Death, Black Narcissus, and The Life and Death of Colonel Blimp, are regarded as classics of British cinema.

Yet, 1949 proved a difficult year for the Rank Organization and it was forced that year to sell off two of its five studios. It is perhaps owing to the timing of this tumult that no Rank film with John Battles appears to have ever been made.

== Late career ==
Professional activity for Battles slowed considerably after his failed bid at starting a career in British cinema. He made what proved to be his final appearance on Broadway in March 1961, nearly 13 years after the close of Allegro. This was for the short-lived 13 Daughters (28 performances), starring Don Ameche, with Battles in the supporting role of William. This role featured no solo turns at song and Battles is not mentioned in the show's New York Times review.

13 Daughters is parenthetically remarkable for being Battles' ultimate appearance on Broadway, however brief, and for the notice in his program biography of his casting in a touring production of "Auntie Mame" at some point after he returned from Europe; Battles is credited there for the role of Brian O'Bannion alongside Shirl Conway in the titular role.

The death of Oscar Hammerstein brought Battles briefly back into the Broadway limelight. He featured among a cast of several stage luminaries assembled to give tribute in song to Hammerstein at the 46th Street Theater on April 8, 1962. Other notables partaking included Mary Martin, Helen Hayes, Alfred Drake, John Raitt, Elaine Stritch, and Hammerstein's long-time composing partner, Richard Rodgers.

== Personal life ==
Early in the run of On the Town, Battles appeared to have an intense, amorous affair with the show's composer-conductor, Leonard Bernstein. In letters to Bernstein dating from early February 1945, Battles wrote of his love for the budding maestro and of the lingering sensations of their sexual encounters.

Battles married Jane Anderson sometime between 1948 and 1949. There is conflicting information as to the actual date of Battles' wedding. On January 29, 1948, The New York Times ran a short item announcing the date of the Battles-Anderson wedding as February 14. Conversely, text accompanying a 1949 King Features Syndicate publicity photo of the couple on their wedding day gives the matrimony date as April 13 of the same year, and the wedding venue as Hampstead Town Hall, in London, where Battles was then starring in the West End musical "Belinda Fair." In the Times' announcement, Miss Anderson's profession was given as "short story writer." Miss Anderson was elsewhere noted as a former model and the daughter of evangelist and author George Wood Anderson.

At the time of his death in Fredericksburg, Texas, Battles was survived by his longtime partner and noted Pilates Elder Ron Fletcher, daughter Catherine Erhard, four grandchildren, and 10 great-grandchildren.
