= A Happening in Central Park =

Live album by Barbra Streisand
- Released: September 1968
- Recorded: 17 June 1967
- Venues: Central Park, New York City
- Genre: Pop
- Length: 37:15 (DVD 53:28)
- Label: Columbia
- Producer: Jack Gold

Barbra Streisand chronology
Funny Girl (soundtrack) (1968)	A Happening in Central Park (1968)	What About Today? (1969)

Alternative cover
- DVD release

Professional ratings
Review scores
Source	Rating
AllMusic	3/5 stars

A Happening In Central Park is the first live album by Barbra Streisand. It was recorded at a live concert in Central Park in New York on Saturday, June 17, 1967, in front of an audience of 125,000 people. The special aired on CBS channel on September 15, 1968, with selected moments from the live show that in its entirety featured thirty-three songs. From the show Streisand developed a stage panic that caused her to perform rarely in subsequent years. According to Streisand: "I forgot the words in front of 125,000 people–—and I wasn't cute about it or anything", "I was shocked; I was terrified. It prevented me from performing for all these years". She said to ABC News that: "I didn't sing and charge people for 27 years because of that night ... I was like, 'God, I don't know. What if I forget the words again?'"

On November 1, 1986, Billboard announced that a VHS tape would be released via CBS/Fox Video with a new introduction made by Barbra talking about her experience doing the live performance. In 2005, Columbia released a box that contained five DVDs, each with the five TV specials that the singer released in the 1960s and 1970s, including the special "A Happening In Central Park". The DVD was released individually in 2007.

In 2018, the singer revealed on her Twitter that the special, along with others released in the box, could be watched via streaming on Netflix that same year.

== Commercial performance ==
The album peaked at number 30 in the US and has been certified gold for sales of 500,000 copies.

== Track listing ==
Side one
No.	Title	Writer(s)	Length
1.	"I Can See It" (from the Musical Production The Fantasticks)	Tom Jones; Harvey Schmidt	2:58
2.	"Love Is Like a New Born Child"	Oscar Brown Jr.	2:55
3.	"Folk Monologue/Value"	Jeffrey D. Harris	4:45
4.	"Cry Me a River"	Arthur Hamilton	3:05
5.	"People" (from the Motion Picture Funny Girl)	Bob Merrill; Jule Styne	4:43

Side two
No.	Title	Writer(s)	Length
1.	"He Touched Me"	Ira Levin; Milton Schafer	3:07
2.	"Marty the Martian"/"The Sound of Music"/"Mississippi Mud"/"Santa Claus Is Coming to Town" (medley)	Harris / Richard Rodgers; Oscar Hammerstein II / Harry Barris; James Cavanaugh / J. Fred Coots; Haven Gillespie	2:40
3.	"Natural Sounds" (from The Juggler)	Lan O'Kun	3:08
4.	"Second Hand Rose"	James F. Hanley; Grant Clarke	3:01
5.	"Sleep in Heavenly Peace (Silent Night)"	Franz Gruber; John Freeman Young; Ray Ellis^{[a]}	3:34
6.	"Happy Days Are Here Again"	Milton Ager; Jack Yellen	3:19

Notes:

- ^{^a} signifies arranged by

== Personnel ==
- Warren Vincent - sound supervision
- Edward T. Graham, Stan Weiss, Phil Macy, Arthur Kendy - engineer
- New York Times - cover photograph

== DVD ==
1. "Introduction"
2. "The Nearness Of You"
3. "Down With Love"
4. "Love Is Like A New Born Child"
5. "Cry Me A River"
6. "Folk Monologue/Value"
7. "I Can See It"
8. "The Sound Of Music"
9. "Mississippi Mud"
10. "Santa Claus Is Coming To Town"
11. "Love Is A Bore"
12. "He Touched Me"
13. "English Folk Song"
14. "I'm All Smiles"
15. "Marty The Martian"
16. "Natural Sounds"
17. "Second Hand Rose"
18. "People"
19. "Silent Night (Sleep In Heavenly Peace)"
20. "Happy Days Are Here Again"

== Charts ==
Chart (1968)	Peak position
Canada Top Albums/CDs (RPM)	19
US Billboard 200	30
US Cashbox Top Albums	21

== Certifications and sales ==
Region	Certification	Certified units/sales
United States (RIAA)	Gold	500,000^{^}
^{^} Shipments figures based on certification alone.
