= I Am Woman (Barbra Streisand song) =

Single by Barbra Streisand
- B-side: "People"
- Released: January 1964
- Recorded: December 20, 1963
- Studio: Columbia 30th Street Studio, New York City
- Genre: Show tune, traditional pop
- Length: 2:53
- Label: Columbia
- Composer: Jule Styne
- Lyricist: Bob Merrill
- Producer: Mike Berniker

Barbra Streisand singles chronology
"My Coloring Book" / "Lover Come Back To Me" (1962)	"People" / "I Am Woman" (1964)	"Absent Minded Me" / "Funny Girl" (1964)

"I Am Woman" is a solo version of the duet "You Are Woman, I Am Man" from the musical Funny Girl. Released as the A-side of the single with "People", the recording peaked at #114 on the US charts, and also peaked at number 6 on the Cash Box Looking Ahead Singles chart.

This single predates the Funny Girl original Broadway cast recording by three months, and was one of the last Streisand recordings to be produced by Mike Berniker. The recording was arranged and conducted by Peter Matz.

The song was released for the first time on CD in 2002 as a bonus track on the European remastered editions of the album People.

== Track listing ==
1. "People"
2. "I Am Woman"

== You Are Woman, I Am Man ==
"You Are Woman, I Am Man" was written by Jule Styne (composer) and Bob Merrill (lyricist) for the Broadway musical Funny Girl (1964) starring Barbra Streisand and Sydney Chaplin, who both introduced the song. For the 1968 film adaptation of Funny Girl, the song was performed by Streisand and Omar Sharif.
