= Drat! The Cat! =

- Original cast recording
- Music: Milton Schafer
- Lyrics: Ira Levin
- Book: Ira Levin
- Productions: 1965 Broadway

Drat! The Cat! is a 1965 musical comedy that follows a gilded age police officer's attempts to arrest The Cat, a notorious jewel thief whose civilian alter ego he is deeply in love with. Its Broadway run lasted just eight days. The show features a book and lyrics by Ira Levin with music by Milton Schafer.

== History ==
Ira Levin got the idea for the show in 1957 and began writing in May 1961. The work was titled Cat and Mouse during its development until Gunter Grass put out a book of the same name, prompting Levin and crew to change the name. "I didn’t like it then, I don’t like it now," he wrote in 2005. "Several critics didn’t like it either. (More advice for young playwrights: Never use two exclamation points in a title. One, you can get away with; two, no.)"

In September 1965 the show debuted at the Shubert Theatre in Philadelphia for an out-of-town try-out, and it ran for 11 previews. On October 10, the Broadway production at the Martin Beck Theatre, presented by Jerry Adler and Norman Rosemont and directed and choreographed by Joe Layton. It ran for only eight performances. The cast included Lesley Ann Warren, Elliott Gould, Charles Durning, Jane Connell, and Beth Howland. Conductor Herbert Grossman served as music director and Clare Grundman arranged the orchestral score. Warren won the Theatre World Award for her performance, and the show was nominated for a Tony Award for Best Scenic Design.

=== Music ===
Levin initially wrote the music himself despite a lack of experience in musical composition, and was eventually convinced by his agent Flora Roberts to allow Milton Schafer to write the music.

A recording of the pre-Broadway Philadelphia show was released as a demonstration record Capitol Custom (TB-504) in 1965. Long after the show closed, Blue Pear Records issued an original cast album from a recording surreptitiously made during a live performance. Gould's wife at the time, Barbra Streisand, had a hit with her recording of "He Touched Me", a gender-reversed version of one of the show's songs, which went to number two on the Easy Listening chart. On the B-side of that single, Streisand recorded "I Like Him", also from the show. In 1997, Varèse Sarabande released a studio recording featuring Susan Egan, Jason Graae, Judy Kaye, Bryan Batt, Jonathan Freeman, and Elaine Stritch. The recording was produced by Bruce Kimmel.

== Synopsis ==
The spoof of late-Victorian melodrama has at its core Alice Van Guilder, who wants to be a career girl at a time when nice young ladies marry well instead of having careers. Frustrated by the obstacles standing in her way, she becomes a cat burglar and plunders the homes of Manhattan's high society in the 1890s.

== Musical numbers ==
Act I

- "Drat! The Cat!" – Citizens, Patrolman, The Mayor, Pincer and Mallet
- "My Son, Uphold the Law" – Roger Purefoy and Patrolmen
- "Holmes and Watson" – Alice Van Guilder and Bob Purefoy
- "She Touched Me" – Bob
- "Wild and Reckless" – Alice
- "She's Roses" – Bob and Kate Purefoy
- "Ballet: "Ignoble Theft of The Idol's Eyes"" – The Cat, Patrolman, and Attendants of the Idol
- "Dancing with Alice – Bob, Alice, Mr. & Mrs. Van Guilder, and Guests
- "Drat! The Cat! (Reprise)" – Mr. & Mrs. Van Guilder and Guests
- "Purefoy's Lament" – Bob

Act II

- "A Pox Upon the Traitor's Brow" – Pincer, Mallet, Emma & Patrolman
- "Deep in Your Heart" – Bob
- "Let's Go" – Alice and Bob
- "It's Your Fault" – Mr. & Mrs. Van Guilder
- "Wild and Reckless (Reprise)" – Bob
- "Ballet: "The Upside-Down Thief"" – Bob, Citizens, Patrolman & Kate
- "Today is a Day for a Band to Play" – Pincer, Mallet, Emma, Patrolman, and Citizens
- "She Touched Me (Reprise)" – Bob and Alice
- "I Like Him" – Alice
- "Justice Triumphant" – Entire Company
- "Today is a Day for a Band to Play (Reprise)" – Entire Company
