= Michael Preston Barr =

American songwriter

Michael Barr (January 2, 1927 in Indiana – May 19, 2009 in Los Angeles, California), was an American composer of traditional pop and showtunes, who in collaboration with lyricist Dion McGregor, wrote "Try Your Wings" for cabaret singer/pianist Blossom Dearie. "Try Your Wings" was also recorded and performed for many years by Anita O'Day and was featured in the 2003 film My Life Without Me, starring Sara Polly and Mark Rufallo. Together, Barr and McGregor also wrote "Where Is The Wonder", which was recorded by Barbra Streisand and featured on her 1965 TV special "My Name Is Barbra".

Barr was also known for having tape-recorded Dion McGregor's surprisingly lucid and humorous "somniloquies", or sleep-talks, in which Dion would narrate complete stories with beginning, middle and end. These can be heard via recordings released originally by Decca Records and later, by Torpor Vigil Industries, the first of which is "The Further Somniloquies of Dion McGregor". John Zorn's Tzadik label also released a CD—a sequel to the LP, called Dion McGregor Dreams Again. The liner notes by compilation co-ordinator Phil Milstein describe details of the meeting of Michael Barr and Dion McGregor and of how these extraordinary recordings came to be.

Barr was working on a movie-musical version of The Dream World Of Dion McGregor which was originally released as an LP through Decca Records in January, 1964. The movie adaptation includes, in addition to the somniliquies songs which comment on them, most of which were written by Mr. Barr and Dion McGregor. There was also a documentary in the works by Markham Street Films at the time of his death.

Other songs by Michael Barr included "Kicks", recorded in 1956 by June Christy and Billy May for Capitol Records. "Hello Love", with lyrics by McGregor and recorded by Blossom Dearie on Verve Records in 1960, "Sawdust Dreams", and "Be My Next" were early unreleased recordings by Joel Grey, The "Hate Song", was originally performed the Upstairs At The Downstairs nightclub in New York City, by Ceil Cabot and Bill Hinnant with William Roy at the piano. It was recorded on MGM Records. "Leaving By Dawn", a commercial torchy version of the earlier "Dion At Dawn", which, in turn, is a rewrite of "Blue Town", and the Gershwinesque "Make Do", which was recorded by Gayle La Rone on her premiere CD, "The Best Is Yet To Come", has lyrics by Patrick "Bas" Ramsey.

In later life Michael experienced continually failing health brought on by diabetes. He was 82 at the time of his death.
