= Sam, You Made the Pants Too Long =

Song by Vaughn Monroe & Ziggy Talent
- Published: 1940
- Genre: Jazz
- Composers: Victor Young (original), Milton Berle, Fred Whitehouse
- Lyricists: Sam M. Lewis (original), parody lyricist unknown

"Sam, You Made the Pants Too Long" is a parody of the song "Lawd, You Made the Night Too Long", written in 1932 by Victor Young with lyrics by Sam M. Lewis. The lyrics play as a lament that a tailor named Sam, while highly skilled at fitting a suit's coat and vest, inadvertently made the trousers far too long.

The parody is of uncertain origin, with Milton Berle and Fred Whitehouse usually credited as having written it in 1940, but with Joe E. Lewis claiming credit and performing it as early as 1937. Even earlier there is a report of "Oh Sam, You Made My Pants Too Long" being performed at a revue by dance pupils in Richmond, Indiana, on June 19, 1935. Versions were released by Ziggy Talent & the Vaughn Monroe Orchestra, the Buffalo Bills, and—heavily modified—Allan Sherman. For many years, it was a staple of comedian Red Buttons. In 1966, Barbra Streisand included a part of the song (as part of a 13-song medley) on her album Color Me Barbra.
