= Color Me Barbra =

1966 studio album by Barbra Streisand

- Cover for compact disc release. Cover drawing by Elinor Bunin

Studio album by Barbra Streisand
- Released: March 1966
- Studios: Columbia Records (New York, NY)
- Genres: Pop, vocal
- Length: 34:12
- Label: Columbia
- Producer: Robert Mersey

Barbra Streisand chronology
My Name Is Barbra, Two... (1965)	Color Me Barbra (1966)	Je m'appelle Barbra (1966)

DVD release

Singles from Color Me Barbra
- 1. "Where Am I Going?" Released: February 1966; 2. "Sam, You Made the Pants Too Long" Released: May 1966; 3. "Non C'est Rien" Released: July 1966

Professional ratings
Review scores
Source	Rating
AllMusic	3/5 stars

Color Me Barbra is the seventh studio album by American singer Barbra Streisand, released on Columbia Records in 1966. The album was yet another sales success for Streisand, reaching number 3 on the US charts and was certified Gold by the RIAA. It was nominated for Album of the Year and Best Female Pop Vocal Performance at the 1967 Grammy Awards, but failed to win either category.

The initial release coincided with Streisand's first color TV special, color still being a novelty at the time: CBS aired Color Me Barbra on March 30, 1966. The special was rebroadcast by CBS on September 14, 1995.

== Track listing ==
Side one

1. "Yesterdays" (Otto Harbach, Jerome Kern) – 3:05
2. "One Kiss" (Oscar Hammerstein II, Sigmund Romberg) – 2:11
3. "The Minute Waltz" (Lan O'Kun, Frédéric Chopin) – 1:59
4. "Gotta Move" (Peter Matz) – 2:01
5. "Non C'est Rien" (Michel Jourdan, Armand Canfora) – 3:27
6. "Where or When" (Lorenz Hart, Richard Rodgers) – 3:06

Side Two

1. Medley – 9:00
  1. "Animal Crackers in My Soup"
  2. "Funny Face"
  3. "That Face"
  4. "They Didn't Believe Me"
  5. "Were Thine That Special Face"
  6. "I've Grown Accustomed to Her Face"
  7. "Let's Face the Music and Dance"
  8. "Sam, You Made the Pants Too Long"
  9. "What's New Pussycat?"
  10. "Small World"
  11. "I Love You"
  12. "I Stayed Too Long at the Fair"
  13. "Look at That Face"
2. "C'est si Bon" (André Hornez, Jerry Seelen, Henri Betti) – 3:40
3. "Where Am I Going?" (Dorothy Fields, Cy Coleman) – 2:50
4. "Starting Here, Starting Now" (Richard Maltby, Jr., David Shire) – 2:53

== DVD ==
1. "Draw Me a Circle"
2. "Yesterdays"
3. "One Kiss"
4. "The Minute Waltz"
5. "Gotta Move"
6. "Non c'est Rien"
7. "Where or When"
8. "Pets"
9. "Animal Crackers in My Soup"
10. "Funny Face"
11. "That Face"
12. "They Didn't Believe Me"
13. "Were Thine That Special Face"
14. "I've Grown Accustomed to Her Face"
15. "Let's Face the Music and Dance"
16. "Sam, You Made the Pants Too Long"
17. "What's New Pussycat?"
18. "Who's Afraid of the Big Bad Wolf?"
19. "Small World"
20. "Try to Remember"
21. "Spring Again"
22. "I Stayed Too Long at the Fair"
23. "Look at That Face"
24. "Any Place I Hang My Hat Is Home"
25. "It Had to Be You"
26. "C'est si bon"
27. "Where Am I Going?"
28. "Starting Here, Starting Now"

== Singles ==
1. "Where Am I Going?" / "You Wanna Bet" 1966
2. "Sam, You Made the Pants Too Long" / "The Minute Waltz" 1966
3. "Non C'est Rien" / "Le Mur" 1966

== Accolades ==
Color Me Barbra received Grammy Award nominations for Album of the Year and for Best Female Vocal Performance.

== Charts ==
Chart	Peak position
Australian Albums (Kent Music Report)	5
German Albums (Offizielle Top 100)	33
Norwegian Albums (VG-lista)	15
US Billboard 200	3
US Cashbox Top Albums	1

== Certifications ==
Region	Certification	Certified units/sales
United States (RIAA)	Gold	500,000^{^}
United States (RIAA) Music videocassette	Gold	50,000^{^}
^{^} Shipments figures based on certification alone.
