= Mon Homme =

1920 song composed by Maurice Yvain

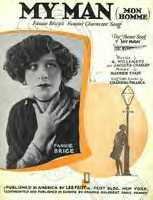
- Sheet music cover, with Fanny Brice, 1921

Song
- Language: French
- English title: "My Man"
- Published: 1920
- Composer: Maurice Yvain
- Lyricists: Jacques-Charles; Albert Willemetz; Channing Pollock (English)

Audio sample
- 1921 instrumental cover by Jack Hylton's band: file; help

"Mon Homme" (French pronunciation: [mɔ̃n‿ɔm]), also known by its English translation, "My Man", is a popular song first published in 1920. The song was originally composed by Maurice Yvain with French lyrics by Jacques-Charles (Jacques Mardochée Charles) and Albert Willemetz. The English lyrics were written by Channing Pollock.

== History ==
"Mon Homme" was copyrighted in France by Maurice Yvain, Albert Willemetz, and Jacques-Charles (Jacques Mardochée Charles) in 1920 and was introduced to Parisian audiences in the revue Paris qui Jazz at the Casino de Paris. The song was performed by revue star Mistinguett and her stage partner American dancer Harry Pilcer.

Although the song originated in France—where it was a hit for Mistinguett—it was popularized in the English-speaking world in the 1920s with the 1921 recording by Ziegfeld Follies singer Fanny Brice. The song was a hit, and the record eventually earned a Grammy Hall of Fame Award for Brice in 1999. Brice also sang the song during one of the sound sequences of the part-talkie film My Man (1928).

Alice Faye sang it in the musical film Rose of Washington Square (1939), a thinly veiled biography of Fanny Brice. (Note: Fanny Brice sued Twentieth Century Fox for using her life story for Rose of Washington Square without her permission. The studio settled out of court for an undisclosed amount.)

The ballad version recorded by Brice was modified by Billie Holiday, who introduced a jazz/blues recording of "My Man" in 1937. Holiday's version was also successful, although the song continued to be associated with Brice. Over the years, other artists from both the United States and abroad covered the song, though none of the artists achieved as much success as Brice and Holiday. Holiday's version of the song was added to the Grammy Hall of Fame in 2018.

== Notable cover versions ==
- Peggy Lee recorded the song for her 1959 album I Like Men!. Her arrangement is very minimalistic, with the drums predominant in the mix. This version peaked at #81 on the US Hot 100.
- In 1965, the song was covered by Barbra Streisand on her album My Name Is Barbra and in the film adaptation of Funny Girl (1968), a loosely based biography of Fanny Brice. Her rendition of "My Man", sung during the film's finale, drew additional critical praise to an already lauded performance that earned her the Oscar for Best Actress at the 41st Academy Awards. (Note: Streisand's win for Best Actress was a tie with Katharine Hepburn for The Lion in Winter.)
- French singer Mireille Mathieu recorded the song in both French and in English. This was one of her concert songs in international tours, and she also performed the song at various concerts in Paris.
- Diana Ross performed the song in her final concert appearance as a Supreme at the Frontier Hotel in Las Vegas, Nevada, on January 14, 1970. Her performance was recorded and later released on the 1970 live album Farewell. Ross adopted Holiday's jazz and blues version rather than the Brice or Streisand version. In 1972, Ross recorded "My Man" again for the soundtrack for the film Lady Sings the Blues, in which she portrayed Billie Holiday. The soundtrack album peaked at #1 on Billboard's Pop albums chart, reportedly selling over 300,000 copies during its first eight days of release. Ross' performance in the film received critical acclaim and Golden Globe and Academy Award nominations for Best Actress; she won the Golden Globe award for "Most Promising Newcomer." Ross' second version of the song was a revival of Holiday's jazz/blues reading. Ross gave one of her most critically hailed performances of the song in 1979 at Caesars Palace in Las Vegas, Nevada, which was recorded for an HBO concert special during her "The Boss" world tour. Ross also included a recording on Blue (recorded in 1973, unreleased until 2006).
- In 1958, Spanish singer/actress Sara Montiel performed the song in the film The Violet Seller with Spanish lyrics by Jesús María de Arozamena and José Juan Cadenas, and it was released under the title "Es mi hombre" in the film's soundtrack album.
- In 1971, Spanish singer Maruja Garrido also recorded a cover of the Spanish version, for a Televisión Española special featuring Salvador Dalí.
- Whitney Houston covered the song, giving it a jazz-pop approach in a medley with "All the Man That I Need" at the 1991 Billboard Music Awards. Houston also performed the song as part of the set list during her I'm Your Baby Tonight Tour.
- Etta James recorded the song for her album Blue Gardenia (2001).
- Lea Michele covered the song in the Glee episode "Funeral". Prior to the episode's airing, she sang the song at MusiCares 2011, where Streisand was honored as Person of the Year. She also performed it as an encore for the closing night of the Broadway revival of Funny Girl.
- Regina Spektor covered the song for the Boardwalk Empire soundtrack in 2011 (featured in the end credits of "A Dangerous Maid").
- The X Factor (UK) contestant Rebecca Ferguson covered the song on her album Lady Sings the Blues, a cover album of songs made famous by Billie Holiday.
- Chilean-Mexican singer Mon Laferte adapted the song to Spanish ("Mi Hombre") in an updated contemporary context for her album Femme Fatale (2025).
