= Milton Schafer =

American musician (1920–2020)

Milton Schafer (September 24, 1920 – April 12, 2020) was an American composer and pianist. After being a runner-up for first prize in the Texas-based national guild of piano teachers competition, Schafer continued his studies for a year in Paris with Nadia Boulanger. He returned to the U.S. to give his Town Hall début as a pianist in 1950, receiving very favorable reviews and performed there again in 1954.

He worked as musical assistant (accompanist and adviser) to Bob Merrill ("(How Much Is) That Doggie in the Window?") for two years and after a stint at MGM in Hollywood, Vernon Duke signed him as a composer with Frank Loesser's publishing company, Frank Music.

His first (unproduced) musical was The Happy Time based on Samuel Taylor's play (and not Kander and Ebb’s later musical of the same name), for which he wrote both lyrics and music. This was followed by an album of children’s songs recorded by Danny Kaye, called Mommy Gimme a Drinka Water for which he also wrote music and lyrics. His first produced musical was Bravo Giovanni! which was nominated for a Tony in 1962, and which starred Cesare Siepi and Michele Lee. This was followed in 1965 by Drat! The Cat! starring Elliott Gould and Lesley Ann Warren, with lyrics and book by Ira Levin, from which score Barbra Streisand recorded “He Touched Me” (originally titled She Touched Me).

== Cultural legacy ==
Schafer's song "Crazy Barbara" was adapted as a children's picture book, That Crazy Barb'ra, illustrated by G. Brian Karas (Dial Press 2003; ISBN 0803725841)
