= Live at the Bon Soir =

Live album by Barbra Streisand
- Released: November 4, 2022
- Recorded: November 5–7, 1962
- Venue: The Bon Soir Nightclub (New York City, New York)
- Genre: Vocal pop
- Length: 69:03
- Label: Columbia
- Producer: Barbra Streisand; Jay Landers; Martin Erlichman

Barbra Streisand chronology
| Release Me 2 (2021) | Live at the Bon Soir (2022) | Evergreens: Celebrating Six Decades on Columbia Records (2023) |

Live at the Bon Soir is the tenth live album by American singer Barbra Streisand. Originally intended as her debut album, the material was recorded over three nights in November 1962 shortly after Streisand was signed by Columbia Records. Retrieved from Streisand's archives and remastered, the live recordings were released November 4, 2022, to coincide with the sixtieth anniversary of the original tapings.

The album received critical acclaim for Streisand's vocal performance and the quality of the restored recordings. Commercially, it debuted and peaked at number 150 on the US Billboard 200.

== Background and recording ==
Columbia Records first signed Streisand in 1962 following her Broadway debut as Miss Marmelstein in I Can Get It for You Wholesale. Following Streisand's string of successful nightclub engagements, including at The Lion and The Bon Soir in Greenwich Village, Columbia planned a live album as her debut. Streisand's live performances at the Bon Soir were recorded November 5 – 7, 1962, but were shelved in favor of studio versions of the same repertoire. The studio recording The Barbra Streisand Album went on to win the Grammy for Album of the Year in 1964.

Selections from the nightclub recordings have been previously released, notably on Streisand's 1991 Just for the Record... box set.

Produced by Streisand, Martin Erlichman, and Jay Landers, the Bon Soir tracks were remastered under the supervision of Streisand and Jochem van der Saag. "The club's acoustics were obviously not designed for recording, and there was a lot of leakage from the instruments into [Streisand's] vocal mic," said van der Saag, requiring the use of spectral editing technology to properly mix the recordings.

== Release and promotion ==
A nightclub recording of "Cry Me a River" was released Friday, September 23, 2022, to preview the album. In contrast to the studio version which appeared as the first track on Streisand's debut album, the Bon Soir recording includes repartee with the "intimate audience" and is accompanied by guitarist Tiger Haynes, bassist Averill Pollard, drummer John Cresci, and pianist Peter Daniels.

Broadway World debuted the music video for "Cry Me a River" on October 7. Directed by Matt Amato, the music video "allows viewers to experience the ambience of the Bon Soir nightclub from Barbra's perspective". This is the third Streisand video directed by Amato. The video received a Gold Telly Award in 2023.

Streisand released the Bon Soir recording of "Napoleon" (from the 1957 musical Jamaica) as another album promotion on October 21, 2022.

The album includes extensive historical notes, photos, and a message from Streisand, with a 12-page booklet for the LP and 32-page booklet for the CD.

== Critical reception ==
Professional ratings
Review scores
| Source | Rating |
|---|---|
| AllMusic | 4.5/5 stars |

Live at the Bon Soir received positive reviews from music critics. In The New York Times, Wesley Morris remarked that Streisand displays a "devastating understanding of tone, shading, pitch, diction but also emotional variability." Writing for AllMusic, Mark Demings praised Streisand's vocal skill, calling her "phrasing and dynamics … remarkably clever and sophisticated", and with the accompanying quartet lending "superb support", the album is "a glorious archival find." In the Washington Blade, Kathi Wolfe similarly praised Streisand's "youthful, gorgeous" vocal performance and also noted the intimacy of the recordings and the repartee included between tracks. Writing for AARP: The Magazine, Jim Farber praised Streisand's vocals, saying she was "at her most radical, unusual — and, in a sense, Streisandian" and calling the album a "masterpiece and a revelation".

Mikael Wood of the Los Angeles Times remarked on Streisand's "balance [of] finesse and vehemence" and named the album one of the best releases of the year.

Select year-end rankings of Live at the Bon Soir
| Publication | List | Rank | Ref. |
|---|---|---|---|
| Los Angeles Times | The 20 Best Albums of 2022 | 8 | |

== Track listing ==
Live at the Bon Soir track listing
| No. | Title | Writer(s) | Length |
|---|---|---|---|
| 1. | "Introduction by Dave Kapralik (Columbia Records) / My Name Is Barbara" | Leonard Bernstein | 2:01 |
| 2. | "Much More" | Tom Jones; Harvey Schmidt | 2:30 |
| 3. | "Napoleon" | Harold Arlen; E.Y. Harburg | 3:19 |
| 4. | "I Hate Music" | Bernstein | 1:16 |
| 5. | "Right as the Rain" | Arlen; Harburg | 2:46 |
| 6. | "Cry Me a River" | Arthur Hamilton | 4:11 |
| 7. | "Value" | Jeff Harris | 2:16 |
| 8. | "Lover, Come Back to Me" | Oscar Hammerstein II; Sigmund Romberg | 1:54 |
| 9. | "Band Introductions" | | 2:56 |
| 10. | "Soon It's Gonna Rain" | Schmidt; Jones | 3:42 |
| 11. | "Come to the Supermarket (in Old Peking)" | Cole Porter | 1:51 |
| 12. | "When the Sun Comes Out" | Arlen; Ted Koehler | 3:14 |
| 13. | "Happy Days Are Here Again" | Jack Yellen; Milton Ager | 3:25 |
| 14. | "Keepin' Out of Mischief Now" | Andy Razaf; Thomas "Fats" Waller | 1:54 |
| 15. | "A Sleepin' Bee" | Arlen; Truman Capote | 4:03 |
| 16. | "I Had Myself a True Love" | Arlen; Johnny Mercer | 4:47 |
| 17. | "Bewitched, Bothered and Bewildered" | Richard Rodgers; Lorenz Hart | 2:39 |
| 18. | "Who's Afraid of the Big Bad Wolf?" | Frank Churchill; Ann Ronell | 2:36 |
| 19. | "I'll Tell the Man in the Street" | Rodgers; Hart | 2:49 |
| 20. | "A Taste of Honey" | Bobby Scott; Ric Marlow | 2:23 |
| 21. | "Never Will I Marry" | Frank Loesser | 2:56 |
| 22. | "Nobody's Heart Belongs to Me" | Rodgers; Hart | 2:14 |
| 23. | "My Honey's Lovin' Arms" | Herman Ruby; Joseph Meyer | 2:10 |
| 24. | "I Stayed Too Long at the Fair" | Billy Barnes | 5:11 |
| Total length: | | | 69:03 |

== Charts ==
Chart performance for Live at the Bon Soir
| Chart (2022) | Peak position |
|---|---|
| Scottish Albums (OCC) | 28 |
| Spanish Albums (PROMUSICAE) | 82 |
| UK Album Downloads (OCC) | 34 |
| US Billboard 200 | 150 |
