= Evergreens: Celebrating Six Decades on Columbia Records =

Compilation album by Barbra Streisand
- Released: October 27, 2023
- Recorded: 1963–2018
- Genre: Vocal pop
- Length: 78:45
- Label: Columbia
- Producers: Barbra Streisand; Jay Landers; Martin Erlichman

Barbra Streisand chronology
Live at the Bon Soir (2022)	Evergreens: Celebrating Six Decades on Columbia Records (2023)	The Secret of Life: Partners, Volume Two (2025)

Evergreens: Celebrating Six Decades on Columbia Records is a compilation album released by American singer and actress Barbra Streisand, on October 27, 2023 by Columbia Records. It features 21 "personal favourite" recordings from Streisand's sixty year-long recording history, as well as a new mix of the title track.

Featuring tracks from most of Streisand's studio albums, the compilation was released on the same day as the 40th Anniversary deluxe reissue of the soundtrack to her film Yentl. The release of both albums coincided with the publication of Streisand's memoir My Name is Barbra.

== Track listing ==
Evergreens: Celebrating Six Decades on Columbia Records track listing
No.	Title	Writer(s)	Original album	Length
1.	"I'll Tell the Man in the Street"	Lorenz Hart; Richard Rodgers	The Barbra Streisand Album (1963)	3:10
2.	"Bewitched (Bothered and Bewildered)"	Hart; Rodgers	The Third Album (1964)	2:54
3.	"Absent Minded Me"	Bob Merrill; Jule Styne	People (1964)	3:09
4.	"The Shadow of Your Smile"	Johnny Mandel; Paul Francis Webster	My Name Is Barbra, Two... (1965)	2:49
5.	"Where or When"	Hart; Rodgers	Color Me Barbra (1966)	3:06
6.	"Ma prèmiere chanson"	Barbra Streisand; Eddy Marnay	Je m'appelle Barbra (1966)	2:20
7.	"I Don't Know Where I Stand"	Joni Mitchell	Stoney End (1971)	3:45
8.	"I Never Meant to Hurt You"	Laura Nyro	Barbra Joan Streisand (1971)	3:48
9.	"Letters That Cross in the Mail"	Rupert Holmes	Lazy Afternoon (1975)	3:39
10.	"Answer Me"	Streisand; Paul Williams; Kenny Ascher	Superman (1977)	3:19
11.	"Tomorrow"	Charles Strouse; Martin Charnin	Songbird (1978)	2:57
12.	"Can't Help Lovin' That Man"	Oscar Hammerstein II; Jerome Kern	The Broadway Album (1985)	3:32
13.	"Two People"	Streisand; Alan Bergman; Marilyn Bergman	Till I Loved You (1988)	3:39
14.	"Some Enchanted Evening"	Hammerstein II; Rodgers	Back to Broadway (1993)	3:55
15.	"I Believe" (single version)	Ervin Drake; Irvin Graham; Jimmy Shirl; Al Stillman	Higher Ground (1997)	3:25
16.	"Isn't It a Pity?"	George Gershwin; Ira Gershwin	A Love Like Ours (1999)	5:23
17.	"Moon River"	Henry Mancini; Johnny Mercer	The Movie Album (2003)	3:43
18.	"Here's to Life" (orchestra version)	Artie Butler; Phyllis Molinary	Love Is the Answer (2009)	4:35
19.	"The Windmills of Your Mind"	A. Bergman; M. Bergman; Michel Legrand	What Matters Most (2011)	3:54
20.	"Who Can I Turn To (When Nobody Needs Me)" (with Anthony Newley)	Leslie Bricusse; Newley	Encore: Movie Partners Sing Broadway (2016)	4:24
21.	"Lady Liberty"	Desmond Child	Walls (2018)	3:52
22.	"Evergreen (Love Theme from A Star Is Born)" (2023 mix)	Streisand; Williams	A Star Is Born (1976)	3:27
Total length:				78:45

== Charts ==
Chart performance for Evergreens: Celebrating Six Decades on Columbia Records
Chart (2023)	Peak position
Scottish Albums (Official Charts)	35
UK Album Downloads (Official Charts)	64
