= Matt Amato =

American film writer and director

Matt Amato is an American film writer and director. His major works include music videos for artists such as Barbra Streisand, Beach House, Bon Iver, Dido, Edward Sharpe and the Magnetic Zeros, Soko, and Wild Nothing. He also co-founded with Heath Ledger the Los Angeles based visual arts collective, The Masses. Amato is now documenting the efforts of historic preservationist Larry Giles at the National Building Arts Center. Amato directed the "pastoral" music video for legendary country-folk musicians and gay activists, Lavender Country, filming in Olympic National Park. Amato directed his third video for Barbra Streisand released by Columbia Records and received a Gold Telly Award in 2023.

== Early life and education ==
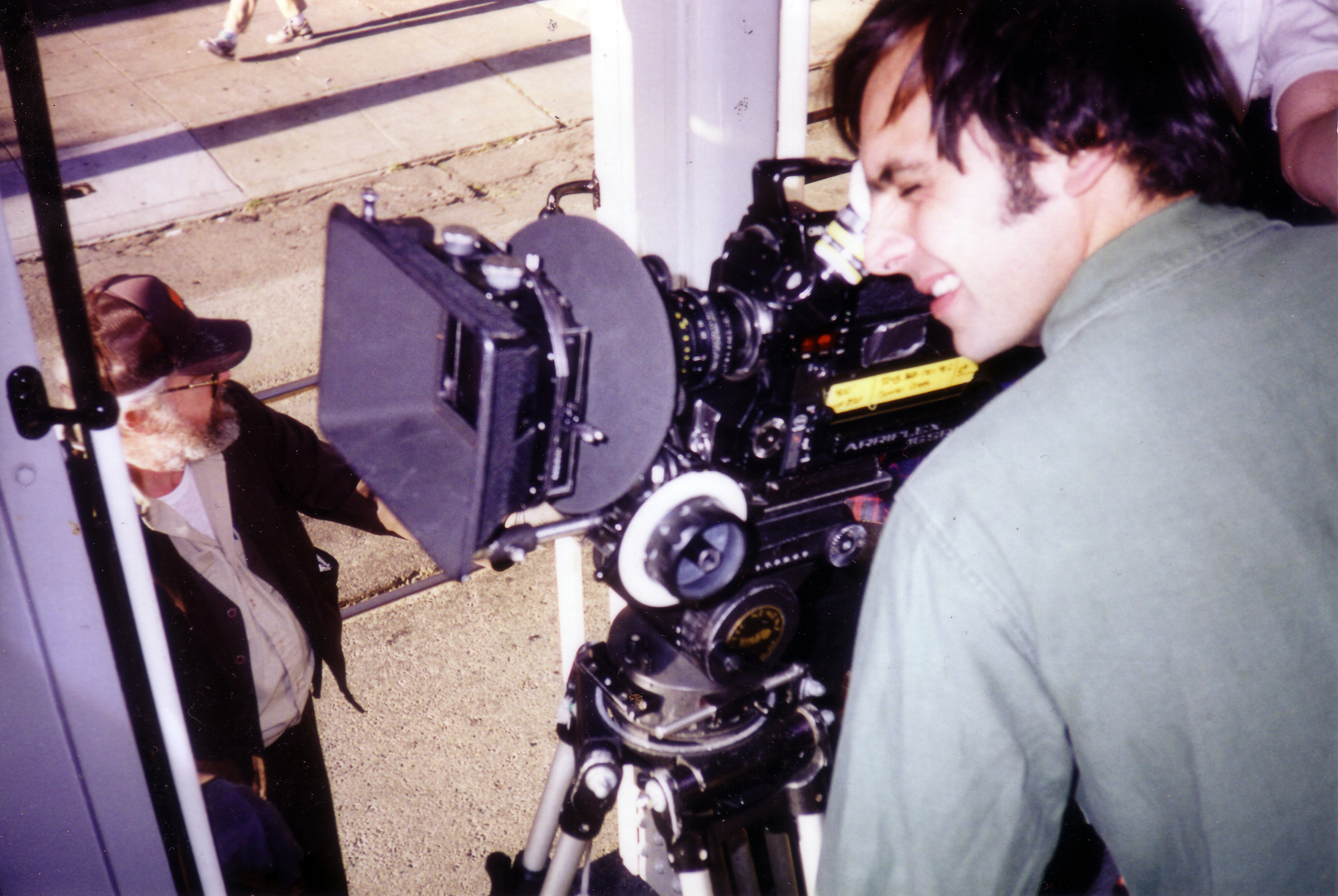
Amato filming Red House Painters music video in San Francisco, CA.

Amato grew up in St. Louis, Missouri and was educated by the Benedictine monks at Saint Louis Priory School. He briefly attended film school at Columbia College in Chicago before venturing to California.

== San Francisco (1990s) ==
Amato began his directing career in the mid-1990s while living in San Francisco. Shooting on 16mm, he created music videos for San Francisco's American Music Club, Red House Painters and Tarnation. Amato’s videos were broadcast on MTV shows such as 120 Minutes and Subterranean. Experimenting with 8mm for the band Tipsy, Amato’s work aired on MTV’s electronic-music based, Amp. Amato continued to make progress at Palm Pictures with a video for Tijuana's Nortec Collective and live visual presentations for Supreme Beings Of Leisure.

== Los Angeles + The Masses (2000s) ==
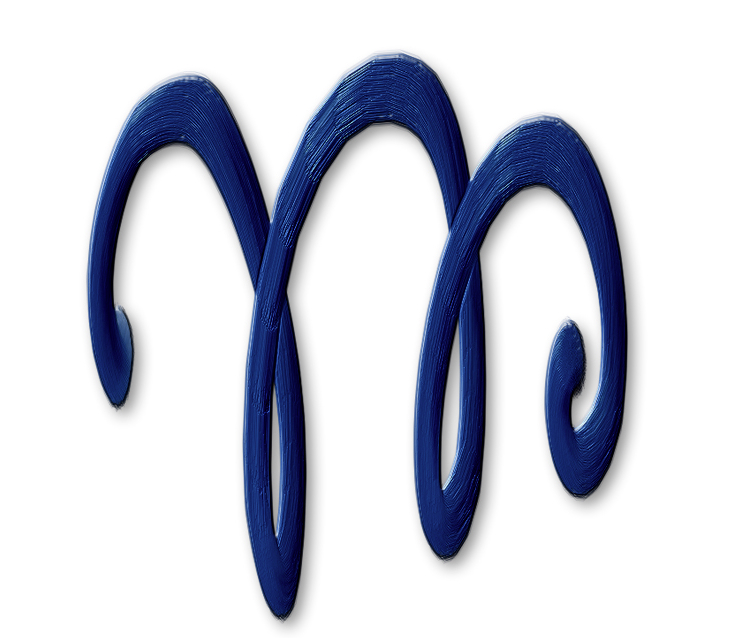
Masses logo designed by Daniel Auber

Amato sustained his work in music videos by embracing digital film-making. In 2006, Amato established a partnership with his best friend, Heath Ledger. Amato told the Los Angeles Times in 2009,

What Heath brought to us at the Masses was his pure creative energy, chessboards and surfboards.

The Masses started developing their own movie projects. During this time, Ledger also developed the screenplay with Amato for what would be Amato's first movie, Never My Love. “I was very well aware of the movies Heath wanted to make, because we shared the same values,” Amato reflects.

We definitely wanted to make movies for smart women. I think he had his daughter in mind, as well. We hated violence in our culture. We’re very against it. We wanted to flip that paradigm and focus on women and love, and chess.

Amato was on location in Eau Claire, WI directing Bon Iver’s first video the day Ledger died. “It was no longer about just making a Bon Iver music video anymore,” the group’s singer-songwriter Justin Vernon says. “This was now our chance to be there with Matt as he grieved. It was a three-day wake."

== The Masses 2.0 (2010s) ==
Matt. I could never ever say enough about Matt Amato. He has an indescribable presence; this warm loving serene calm with intense interest and excitement bubbling beneath his exterior. He's some sort of amazing mind reader and balances it with his trust in you and yours in him. Example, that kiss was not planned (at least not to my knowledge) and yet I felt like it was somehow almost our idea together... It was truly such a wonderful experience and so, so fun to be apart[sic] of a visual artist's world for a moment. - Madi Diaz singer/songwriter

Amato joined forces with Executive Producer Jack Richardson in what was essentially the Masses 2.0. The Masses functioned as a directors agency representing music video directors in Los Angeles: Ben Fee, Ben Kutsko, Chris Coats, Alistair Legrand, Isaiah Seret, Elliot Sellers, Raúl Fernández, Eli Stonberg, Alex Pelly to name just a few. The Masses also assisted in the creation of OMG! Cameras Everywhere!, a music video making summer camp for young people in Los Angeles, London and NYC. Amato's "gorgeous, incredibly cinematic" videos are known for their intimacy, spontaneity and sense of place often filming on location. Amato says,

It's about connecting with people. I've had some great opportunities to connect in a very personal way with some of the artists I worked with on music videos. There is that sense of nostalgia, even while you're there, on some music videos. I'm thinking particularly of the family I stayed with in Scotland when I did the Withered Hand video. Or working with Justin out in the woods during the Bon Iver video. Those are very powerful memories for me.

For Barbra Streisand's Release Me, "While Streisand had recorded the unreleased song in 1970, Amato did not direct the video until 2012. Consequently, he had to jog the memories of the original producer, Richard Perry, about important details of the original recording. Amato reproduced small details such as the original type of microphone preferred by Streisand and the setting of the recording. Amato describes it as “an exercise in verisimilitude.” Amato invited "Kodachrome-drenched journeying" actress Michelle Williams to work with him on a "wistful" and "visually arresting" music video for Wild Nothing's Paradise. Amato "comely grasps the elusive feeling of the song" and captures "Williams’ especially moving and elegant performance that elevates the video to absolute emotional harmony."

== I Am Heath Ledger (2017) ==
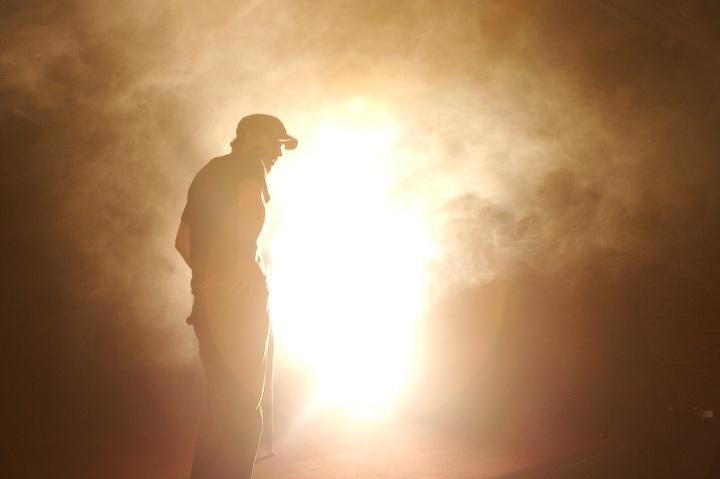
Ledger behind-the-scenes of his music video for Ben Harper's Morning Yearning

Amato signed on as an Executive Producer and creative consultant on the documentary film, I Am Heath Ledger. He traveled to Perth, Australia to work with Ledger's family and to insure it would be a magnanimous sketch of his friend and partner. It premiered at the Tribeca Film Festival with a Q+A involving Amato and Ledger's sisters, Ashleigh Bell and Kate Ledger. The "uncommonly tender" documentary is heralded for its sensitivity while reflecting on the actor's artistic nature as told by his most faithful friends and loved ones. "I Am Heath Ledger is a cinematic portrait of Ledger the artist. Devoid of gossip and any hint of salaciousness," one reviewer noted. "The result is refreshing, insightful, and also devastatingly sad." It currently holds an 86% on Rotten Tomatoes. "I'll always have my reservations with the final product. But, overall, it's a very positive portrait of a real lover of life, and his family truly loves it.Their appreciation of it means a lot to me and made it worth doing.” Amato told MTV News. “And I felt like there needed to be an anecdote to all of the gossip that's out there.”

I don’t need to defend Heath or tell people how you should feel about Heath because you already have a feeling about Heath. He did his job beautifully. He was a communicator. He reached people, and that was his art.

== Never My Love ==
Amato returned to his hometown of St. Louis to write and direct his debut feature, Never My Love, (aka The Makings Of You) starring Sheryl Lee, Grace Zabriskie and Jay R. Ferguson. After resolving legal issues concerning an investor, Amato completed the movie as it was intended in 2024 and is looking forward to its official release. An early cut of the movie garnered some glowing reviews; this one from The Hollywood Reporter:

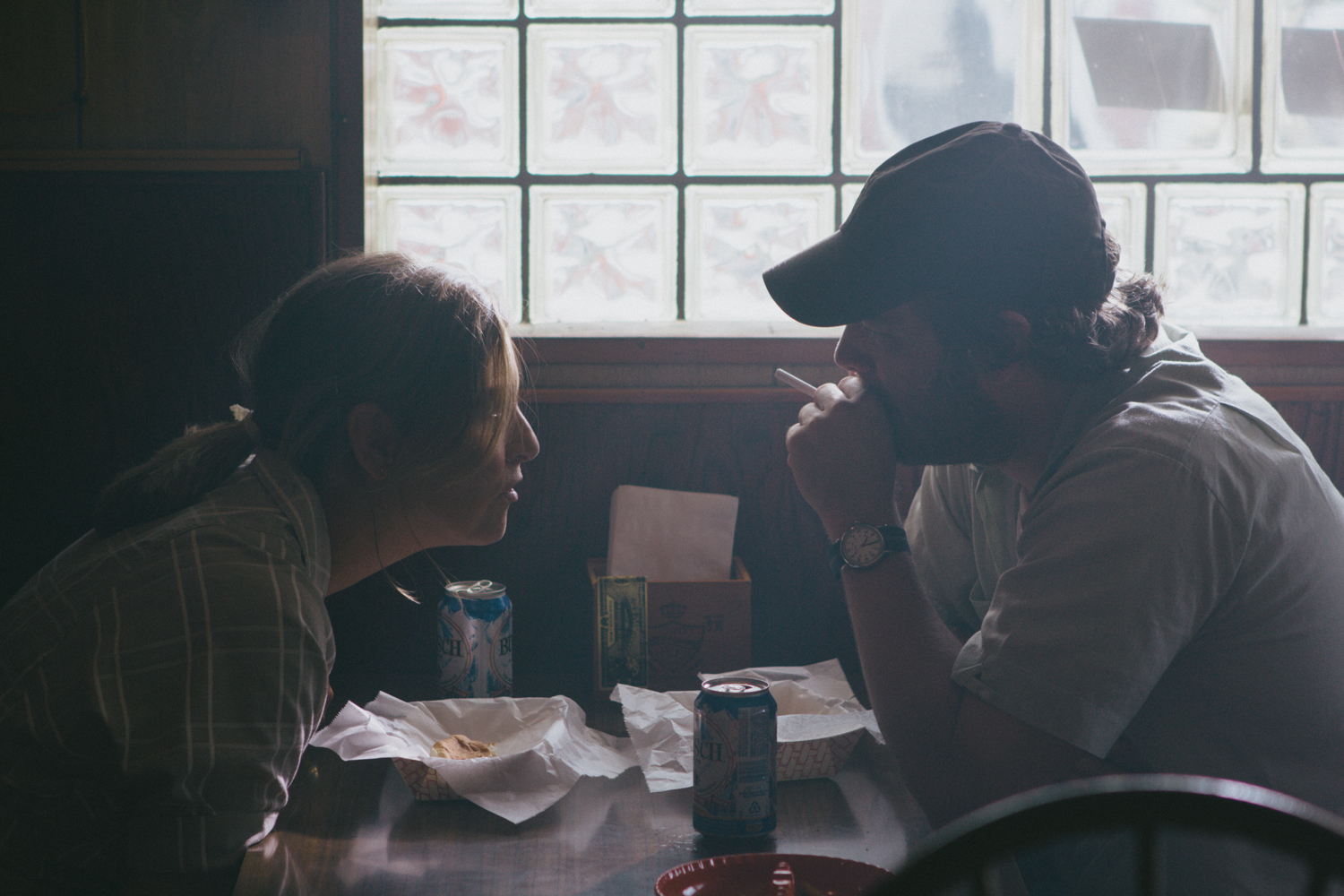
Sheryl Lee + Jay R. Ferguson in Never My Love

This beautifully acted and photographed drama leaves a lasting impression. Amato, a veteran helmer of music videos, invests the proceedings with a subtle, dreamlike quality that gives the film an undeniable, but never stultifying, artsy feel. If you're not already in love when you see the film, you'll desperately want to be afterwards.

== VJ Shows + Exhibitions + Screenings ==
Year	Work	Exhibition	Notes
2001	"Art On The Rocks"	Jukkasjärvi, Sweden	Collaboration with Ann Magnuson
2007	"Tonalism"	Farmlab, Los Angeles	All night VJ event with Dublab artists
2008	"Labrat Matinee"	Kraak Festival, Brussels	Dublab sponsored screening of music videos
2008	"The Masses"	Marfa Film Festival	Centerpiece screening of music videos from The Masses.
2009	"The Masses"	Rome Film Festival	Special screening featuring the work of The Masses with Q+A
2009	"Tonalism"	Henry Miller Library, Big Sur CA	All night VJ event with Dublab artists
2010	"Real Love"	Blythe Projects / Los Angeles	Group show: Matt Amato, Borkur, Anthony James
2011	"Explosions In the Sky"	Hollywood Forever Cemetery	Group show: Matt Amato, Matthew Lessner, James Fields, Jesse Fleming, Chris Lipomi and Alexis Disselkoen
2010	"Tonalism"	Reed College, Portland OR	All night VJ event with Dublab artists
2010	"Northern Lights"	Los Angeles Film Festival	Group show: Richard Ayoade, Andreas Nilsson, Keith Schofield, Shynola, Eric Wareheim
2010	"Imperfect As They Are"	New Museum NYC	Group show: Bruce La Bruce, Jonas Mekas, Albert Maysles, Agnes b., Mark Borthwick, Harmony Korine, Miranda July, Mount Eerie, Erroll Morris
2010	"La Forêt de Harinezumi"	Paris / Tokyo	Group show: Chan Wook Park, Charlotte Gainsbourg, Kim Gordon, Christopher Doyle, Ed Templeton
2012	"Labrat Matinee 10"	USC School of Cinematic Arts	Dublab screening of music videos: Daniels, Flying Lotus, Kahlil Joseph
2013	"Book Of James"	Los Angeles Film Festival	Group show: Music Videos for the Sake of Art, Not YouTube Views
2014	"Sound + Image"	The Luminary St. Louis MO	Gallery show featuring music videos and film clips and neon light installation
2015	"Gena Rowlands Tribute"	LAFCA	Gena Rowlands career achievement award presented by Angelina Jolie
2016	"An Evening With Ann Magnuson"	Museum of Modern Art	Screening of two collaborations: In Search Of My Blonde Roots and Time Traveling Hooker
2017	"I Am Heath Ledger"	Tribeca Film Festival	Premiere of documentary with Q+A led by Jess Cagle
2023	"Unbraid: Chapters I - VIII"	Pulitzer Arts Foundtation	Screening of a work in progress about the life and work of Larry Giles
2023	"Harinezumi Movies"	Webster Film Series	Screening of experimental short films and music videos
2024	"Golden Ghosts"	St Louis Filmmakers Showcase	Screening of experimental short films and music videos

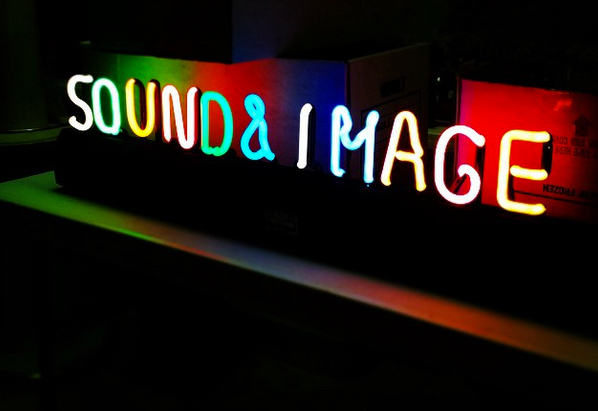
Neon from Amato's show at The Luminary

== Music videos ==
Year	Title	Artist	Label
1993	"American Music Club"	American Music Club	Warner Bros./Reprise
1994	"Can You Help Me?"	American Music Club	Warner Bros./Reprise
1995	"Summer Dress"	Red House Painters	4AD
1995	"Cheap Cuts"	Licquorice	4AD
1995	"The Luv Show"	Ann Magnuson	Geffen Records
1995	"Sparkle And Fade"	Everclear	Capitol Records
1996	"Ultralounge"	Ultralounge	Capitol Records
1996	"Mr. Excitement"	Tipsy	Asphodel Records
1996	"You're One"	Imperial Teen	London Recordings
1997	"Your Thoughts And Mine"	Tarnation	Warner Bros./Reprise
2001	"Polaris"	Nortec Collective	Palm Pictures
2003	"The Movies"	Earlimart	Palm Pictures
2003	"Sun Angle Calculator"	Serart	Columbia Records
2004	"Midnight"	Joel Virgil	Electric Monkey
2004	"International Lover"	Rivera F	Tape Modern
2006	"Lovers In Captivity"	Ima Robot	Virgin/EMI
2007	"Fools"	The Dodos	Frenchkiss Records
2008	"Night Of A Thousand Kisses"	Mia Doi Todd	City Zen Records
2008	"Live At Farmlab"	Cluster	Dublab
2008	"Live At Farmlab"	Lucky Dragons	Dublab
2008	"The Wolves (Act 1 + 2)"	Bon Iver	Secretly Canadian
2008	"Used To Be"	Beach House	Carpark Records
2008	"Safe Trip Home"	Dido	Sony Music
2009	"40 Day Dream"	Edward Sharpe And The Magnetic Zeros	Rough Trade
2009	"And The Ghosts Boarded Trains"	Garrett Pierce	Crossbill Records
2009	"Fables"	The Dodos	Frenchkiss Records
2009	"Northern Lights"	Bowerbirds	Dead Oceans
2010	"Colour"	The Long Lost	Dublab
2010	"Something Golden"	Le Corps Mince de Françoise	Kitsuné, Saatchi + Saatchi
2010	"Real Love"	Beach House	Sup Pop
2010	"Average Fruit"	Quadron	Plug Research
2010	"The High Road", "Vaporize", "The Ghost Inside"	Broken Bells	Columbia Records
2010	"Take The Pain Out Of Your Chest"	60 Watt Kid	Absolutely Kosher
2011	"Let's Go"	Madi Diaz	Small Horse Records
2011	"Tantra Sky"	Pharaohs	Dublab
2011	"Anit-Psalm"	Sister Crayon	Manimal Vinyl
2011	"Book Of James"	Augustines	Oxcart Records
2011	"Noche y Dia / San Raphael"	Matthewdavid	Alpha Pup
2011	"Live At Hollywood Forever"	Bright Eyes	Saddle Creek Records
2012	"No Cigarettes"	Withered Hand	Absolutely Kosher
2012	"No More Home, No More Love"	Soko	Because Music
2012	"Shapeshift Of Uranus"	Carlos Niño & Friends featuring Dntel	Ninja Tune
2012	"Juarez"	Augustines	Oxcart Records
2012	"I Think It's Going To Rain Today"	Barbra Streisand	Columbia Records
2012	"Paradise"	Wild Nothing	Captured Tracks
2013	"Contemplate"	Sweatson Klank	Project Mooncircle
2015	"Daddy, I Cut My Hair"	Daughn Gibson	Sub Pop
2020	"To Be That Someone"	Jack Grelle	Jack Grelle Music
2020	"For The Beauty Of The Earth"	Betty Buckley + The SAE School Choir	Arts for Biden-Harris
2021	"I'd Want It To Be You"	Barbra Streisand + Willie Nelson	Columbia Records
2022	"This Town"	Trixie Mattel + Shakey Graves	Peg Records
2022	"I Can't Shake The Stranger Out Of You"	Lavender Country	Don Giovanni Records
2022	"Cry Me A River"	Barbra Streisand	Columbia Records
2024	"Emotion"	Mia Doi Todd	City Zen Records
2024	"Golden Ghosts"	Steven Deeds	Steven Deeds Music
