= Barbra Streisand (disambiguation) =

Barbra Streisand (born 1942) is an American singer, actress, director, and songwriter.

Barbra Streisand also may refer to:

- Barbra Joan Streisand (album), her 1971 self-titled album
- "Barbra Streisand" (song), a 2010 song by Duck Sauce
- The Barbra Streisand Album, her 1963 debut studio album
