= The Second Barbra Streisand Album =

Studio album by Barbra Streisand
- Released: August 1963
- Recorded: February 8, 1963, June 3, 6, 7, 1963
- Studios: Columbia 7th Ave, New York City
- Genre: Traditional pop
- Length: 37:05
- Label: Columbia
- Producer: Mike Berniker

Barbra Streisand chronology
The Barbra Streisand Album (1963)	The Second Barbra Streisand Album (1963)	The Third Album (1964)

Singles from The Second Barbra Streisand Album
- 1. "When the Sun Comes Out" Released: November 1962; 2. "My Coloring Book/Lover, Come Back to Me" Released: November 1962; 3. "My Coloring Book (Re-release)" Released: March 1965

Professional ratings
Review scores
Source	Rating
Allmusic	3/5 stars

The Second Barbra Streisand Album is the title of Barbra Streisand's second solo studio album. It was released in August 1963, just six months after the release of her debut album, The Barbra Streisand Album, and was recorded in four days in June 1963.

In 1963, Streisand told a reporter: "My new album is called The Second Barbra Streisand Album, because that's just what it is. Why should I give it some fancy name that no one remembers anyway?"

Radio stations received mono and stereo blue vinyl promo albums, making this Columbia's first Streisand colored vinyl.

By 1966 the album sold over one million copies worldwide. The album made its digital debut on CD in 1987 and was re-released in a remastered CD edition on October 19, 1993.

== Song information ==
- "Any Place I Hang My Hat Is Home" was first introduced in the musical St. Louis Woman.
- "Right as the Rain" was originally performed by Celeste Holm and David Brooks in the 1944 musical Bloomer Girl. Tony Bennett also recorded a version of the song in 1960 for his album A String of Harold Arlen.
- "Down with Love" was previously recorded in 1940 by Eddie Condon's Orchestra with vocals by Lee Wiley.
- "Who Will Buy?" is originally from the musical Oliver! (1960).
- "When the Sun Comes Out" was originally performed by Tommy Dorsey in 1941.
- "Gotta Move" was written specifically for Streisand by composer Peter Matz. It was later re-recorded for the TV special Color Me Barbra and its soundtrack album.
- "Lover, Come Back to Me" was introduced in the operetta The New Moon (1928) by Evelyn Herbert.
- "Like a Straw in the Wind" is performed as a medley with "Any Place I Hang My Hat Is Home".

== Unreleased songs ==
- On 8 February 1963, Barbra recorded Cole Porter's “Who Would Have Dreamed” from the 1940 Broadway show Panama Hattie. The recording is still unreleased.
- A recording of "It Had to Be You" from June 1963 – the song was later re-recorded in November for The Third Album – the June recording is still unreleased.

== Track listing ==
Side one
No.	Title	Writer(s)	Length
1.	"Any Place I Hang My Hat Is Home"	Harold Arlen; Johnny Mercer	2:45
2.	"Right as the Rain"	Harold Arlen; E. Y. Harburg	3:25
3.	"Down With Love"	Harold Arlen; E. Y. Harburg	3:42
4.	"Who Will Buy?"	Lionel Bart	3:32
5.	"When the Sun Comes Out"	Harold Arlen; Ted Koehler	3:23

Side two
No.	Title	Writer(s)	Length
1.	"Gotta Move"	Peter Matz	2:01
2.	"My Coloring Book"	Fred Ebb; John Kander	4:11
3.	"I Don't Care Much"	Fred Ebb; John Kander	2:52
4.	"Lover, Come Back to Me"	Oscar Hammerstein II; Sigmund Romberg	2:18
5.	"I Stayed Too Long at the Fair"	Billy Barnes	4:21
6.	"Like a Straw in the Wind"	Harold Arlen	4:46

== Non-album tracks ==
- "When the Sun Comes Out" (1962 version)
- "My Coloring Book" (1962 version)
- "Lover, Come Back to Me" (1962 version)

== Personnel ==
- Barbra Streisand - vocals
- Mike Berniker - producer
- Peter Matz - arrangements, conductor
- Peter Daniels - additional material
- Fred Plaut, Frank Laico - recording engineer
- Fred Glaser - Ms. Streisand's coiffure
- John Berg - album cover, design
- Wood Kuzoumi - cover photography
- Jule Styne - liner notes

== Charts ==
=== Weekly charts ===
Chart	Peak position
US Billboard 200	2
US Cashbox Top Albums	1

=== Year-end charts ===
Chart (1964)	Position
US Cash Box	4

== Certifications and sales ==
Region	Certification	Certified units/sales
United States (RIAA)	Gold	500,000^{^}
Summaries
Worldwide as of 1966	—	1,000,000
^{^} Shipments figures based on certification alone.
