= My Coloring Book =

Song by Kander and Ebb

"My Coloring Book" is a song written by Fred Ebb and John Kander. First performed by Sandy Stewart in 1962 on the television program The Perry Como Kraft Music Hall, she was one of the first artists to record the work in 1962 when it was released as a single. She also included the song on her 1963 album which was also named My Coloring Book. Stewart's single charted in the top 20, and so did another 1962 single version of the song recorded by Kitty Kallen. Stewart's recording of the song was nominated for the 1963 Grammy Award for Best Solo Vocal Performance, Female and Kander and Ebb were nominated for the 1963 Grammy Award for Song of the Year. Barbra Streisand also recorded the song as a single in 1962, but it was a financial flop. She made a different recording of the work on her 1963 album, The Second Barbra Streisand Album, which was a critical success and has enjoyed enduring popularity. Many other artists have recorded and performed the song in succeeding decades, most recently Kristin Chenoweth in 2014. While not originally written for one of their musicals, the song was included in the Off-Broadway musical revue And the World Goes ‘Round: The Songs of Kander and Ebb in 1991.

== Composition and early performance and recording history ==
"My Coloring Book" / "Lover, Come Back to Me"

Single by Barbra Streisand

from the album The Second Barbra Streisand Album
- Released: November 1962
- Recorded: 1962
- Studio: Columbia 7th Ave (New York, NY)
- Genre: Pop
- Label: Columbia
- Songwriters: Fred Ebb; John Kander
- Producer: Mike Berniker

Barbra Streisand singles chronology
"Happy Days Are Here Again" / "When the Sun Comes Out" (1962)	"My Coloring Book" / "Lover, Come Back to Me" (1962)	"People" / "I Am Woman" (1964)

Kander and Ebb originally wrote the song "My Coloring Book" for Kaye Ballard who was a close friend of the song writing duo. Ballard brought the song to the producers of the television show The Perry Como Kraft Music Hall with whom she was a regular performer. Kander and Ebb performed the song for Nick Vanoff, one of the producers of the show, who liked the song but felt the material needed a singer other than Ballard. The producers were not open to having Ballard sing the song because they felt she was a comedian and not a singer who could effectively deliver more serious material.

The producers of The Perry Como Kraft Music Hall had Sandy Stewart perform the premiere of the song on the October 31, 1962 broadcast of the television program. The critical and public response to this performance was enthusiastic, with more than 20,000 fan letters coming in for Stewart about her performance. Tommy Valando published the song with Sunbeam Music, a division of Broadcast Music, Inc., for sheet music sales at this time. Record labels and performing artists quickly lobbied Kander and Ebb for the right to record and perform the song, resulting in multiple different single recording releases in 1962. Charles Sinclair in Billboard wrote

"One of the sharpest record duels in recent weeks is shaping up over the season's prettiest new ballad — a timely John Kander-Fred Ebb tune called "My Coloring Book." No less than four single versions of it reached BMW for review last week, and more are reported in the works.

The first four singles of "My Coloring Book" were all released simultaneously in the last week of November and first week of December 1962 by singers Sandy Stewart, Kitty Kallen, George Chakiris, and Barbra Streisand. Stewart's single of the work, made for Colpix Records, was paired with "I Heard You Cry Last Night" as a b-side. Record sales of her single were boosted considerably by several more performances of the song on television, including The Tonight Show Starring Johnny Carson and The Merv Griffin Show. In January 1963 she released her album, My Coloring Book, named after the song. Stewart's version was nominated for the Grammy Award for Best Solo Vocal Performance, Female in 1963. She also included the song on her 1963 album which was titled after the song.

Chakiris's single was paired with the song "I've Got Your Number" as a b side and was made with Capitol Records. Kallen's single was made for RCA Victor Records and included "Here to Us" as a b-side. Kallen's single sold very well, and by January 12, 1963, her version and Stewart's version were closely matched on the Billboard Hot 100 with Kallen placing 13th and Stewart placing 14th on the chart.

Streisand heard Stewart perform My Coloring Book on Perry Como's show, and she called Kander and Ebb the day after to ask them if she could record the song. They agreed. Her version was arranged and conducted by Robert Mersey, the song was released as Barbra Streisand's second single release in November 1962, as a double single with "Lover, Come Back To Me". Produced by Mike Berniker, and recorded before Streisand's first album sessions, the single was sent to radio. This release did not sell well, and the 1962 recordings of "My Coloring Book" by Sandy Stewart and Kitty Kallen both were more financially profitable that Streisand's version. This 1962 version was re-released as a single in March 1965 as part of the "Hall of Fame" series with the 1962 recording of "Happy Days Are Here Again". Streisand later re-recorded the song for her critically successful second album, The Second Barbra Streisand Album.

"Happy Days Are Here Again" / "My Coloring Book"

Single by Barbra Streisand

from the album The Barbra Streisand Album
- Released: March 1965
- Recorded: 1962
- Studio: Columbia Studio A (New York, NY)
- Genre: Pop
- Songwriters: Fred Ebb; John Kander

== List of recordings ==
- Kitty Kallen recorded it in 1962.
- Perry Como recorded it in 1963 on his album Songs I Love.
- Kate Smith recorded it on her 1963 album The Sweetest Sounds.
- Andy Williams released a version on his 1963 album, Days of Wine and Roses and Other TV Requests.
- Brenda Lee recorded the song for her 1963 album All Alone Am I.
- Julie London included the song on her 1963 album The End of the World
- Skeeter Davis recorded it for her 1963 album Skeeter Davis Sings The End of the World.
- George Chakiris recorded the song as a single with "I've Got Your Number" as B side in 1963.
- Dusty Springfield recorded the song for her 1964 debut album A Girl Called Dusty.
- Sarah Vaughan recorded the song for her 1964 album Vaughan with Voices.
- Jane Morgan recorded it for her 1965 album In My Style.
- Ethel Ennis recorded it for her 1965 album My Kind of Waltztime.
- Cliff Richard recorded it for his 1965 album Love is Forever.
- Aretha Franklin recorded the song in 1964, and it was released on her album Soft and Beautiful in 1969.
- The King's Singers recorded it for their 1972 album The King's Singers Collection; reissued on the 2005 CD, Colouring Book.
- The Anita Kerr Singers recorded the song in 1973 for the LP of the same title on the Apex label.
- Mel Carter Recorded the song in 1976 as a single and reached (#47 Adult Contemporary chart)
- It was featured in the 1991 Kander and Ebb musical revue And The World Goes 'Round.
- Agnetha Fältskog recorded the song for her album My Colouring Book (2004).
- Kristin Chenoweth recorded the song for her album Coming Home (2014).
