= To My Wonderful One =

Studio album by Tony Bennett
- Released: February 1960
- Recorded: October 23 & November 10–12, 1959
- Studio: CBS 30th Street (New York City)
- Genre: Vocal jazz
- Length: 38:23
- Label: Columbia; CL 1429; CS 8226
- Producer: Mitch Miller

Tony Bennett chronology
Hometown, My Town (1959)	To My Wonderful One (1960)	Tony Sings for Two (1961)

Professional ratings
Review scores
Source	Rating
AllMusic	3.5/5 stars

To My Wonderful One is an album by American singer Tony Bennett. It was originally recorded in 1959 and released in 1960 on Columbia as CL 1429.

On November 8, 2011, Sony Music Distribution included the CD in a box set entitled The Complete Collection.

== Track listing ==
1. "Wonderful One" – (Paul Whiteman, Ferde Grofé, Theodora Morse, Marshall Neilan) – 3:17
2. "Till" (Charles Danvers, Carl Sigman) – 3:00
3. "September Song" (Kurt Weill, Maxwell Anderson) – 3:53
4. "Suddenly" (Dorcas Cochran, Richard Heuberger) – 3:07
5. "I'm a Fool to Want You" (Frank Sinatra, Jack Wolf, Joel S. Herron) – 3:21
6. "We Mustn't Say Goodbye" (Al Dubin, James V. Monaco) – 3:15
7. "Autumn Leaves" (Johnny Mercer, Joseph Kosma, Jacques Prevert) – 3:32
8. "Laura" (Johnny Mercer, David Raksin) – 3:05
9. "April in Paris" (Vernon Duke, E. Y. Harburg) – 2:34
10. "Speak Low" (Kurt Weill, Ogden Nash) – 2:48
11. "Tenderly" (Walter Gross, Jack Lawrence) – 3:36
12. "Last Night When We Were Young" (Harold Arlen, E. Y. Harburg) – 2:55

Recorded on October 23 (track 6), November 10 (tracks 1, 7–8, 11), November 11 (tracks 2–3, 10) and November 12 (tracks 4–5, 9, 12), 1959.

== Personnel ==
- Tony Bennett – vocals
- Frank De Vol – conductor, arranger
- Ralph Sharon – piano
- Al Caiola, Billy Bean, Al Casamenti, Tony Mottola, Dan Perri, Bucky Pizzarelli – guitar
- Janet Soyer – harp
- Frank Carroll, Don Payne – bass
- H. Breuer, Bradley Spinney – percussion
- Panama Francis – drums

=== Strings ===
- Seymour Barab, Maurice Bialkin, David Soyer – violoncello
- Rudolph Bocheo, Al Breuning, Fred Buldrini, Max Cahn, Alexander Cores, Arnold Eidus, James A. Grasso, Emanuel Green, Leo Kahn, Harry Katzman, Leo Kruczek, George Ockner, Samuel Rand, A. Rudnitzky, Tosha Samoroff, D. Sarcer, Julius Schachter, Maurice Wilk, Paul Winter, Harry Zarief, Jack Zayde – violin
- Sidney Brecher, Richard Dickler – viola
