= The Makings of You =

- Directed by: Matt Amato
- Written by: Matt Amato
- Produced by: Matt Amato; Sheryl Lee; Jack Richardson; Grace Zabriskie
- Starring: Sheryl Lee; Jay R. Ferguson; Grace Zabriskie
- Cinematography: Chris Benson
- Edited by: Matt Amato; Alexandra Pelly
- Production company: The Masses
- Running time: 98 minutes
- Country: United States
- Language: English

The Makings of You, also known as Never My Love, is a drama film directed by Matt Amato and starring Sheryl Lee and Jay R. Ferguson. The movie was shot in the director's hometown of St. Louis and is a "labor of love that includes some of the most beautiful images of his hometown ever captured on film." It is the reunion of Twin Peaks alum Sheryl Lee and Grace Zabriskie as mother and daughter, who also produced the film, with production company The Masses. The director planned the release of a reedited version of the film in 2021. However, the film remained unreleased as of 2025.

== Plot ==
Single mother Judy (Sheryl Lee) and consignment shop owner Wallis (Jay R. Ferguson) fall in love when they meet in Wallis' shop. Judy's mother Margaret (Grace Zabriskie) and her sons Roy (Grant Leuchter) and Eric (Gene Lesher) don't accept the relationship. This is an "uncompromisingly visionary and unconventionally methodical film (think Antonioni, circa 1960), reminds viewers that even the most dismissed areas of an often dismissed city can evoke heretofore unseen sparks of vibrancy."

== Cast ==
- Sheryl Lee as Judy
- Jay R. Ferguson as Wallis
- Grace Zabriskie as Margaret
- Grant Leuchtner as Roy
- Gene Lesher as Eric
- Henry Goldkamp as Carl
- Elizabeth Ann Townsend as Mrs. Bea
- Craig Hawksley as Scotti

== Previews ==
An early cut of the film was first screened at as a work in progress at St. Louis International Film Festival in November 2014. It was also previewed at Sarasota Film Festival in April 2015, Portland Film Festival in September 2015, Carmel Film Festival in October 2015, Arthouse Film Festival in April 2016 and Harrisburg-Hershey Film Festival in September 2016. The director announced in 2019 that he is releasing a new version of the film in 2020.

== Release ==
A version of the film was shown out of competition at festivals in 2015. Involvement with a fraudulent investor prohibited the movie from being released until the filmmakers were able to achieve legal resolution. In 2020, the director and editor were able to finish the movie as it was intended.

== Reception ==
"Amato is a radical filmmaker, willing to make a movie that travels like a river, or unfolds like a piece of music or a real human life, something that seems alien after we’ve slumped in theater seats, overdazzling our retinas with exploding cars and exploding planets. He realizes the transformative power of seeing—and not seeing. Of showing the full spectrum of a full human life, with a slice hidden in shadow. That unsettled, mysterious place makes room for the watcher but throws down the challenge to do more than just watch. Is this is a particle, or a wave? it asks. Who are you? What's in your pockets? And what do you see?"

"This beautifully acted and photographed drama leaves a lasting impression. Amato, a veteran helmer of music videos, invests the proceedings with a subtle, dreamlike quality that gives the film an undeniable, but never stultifying, artsy feel. If you're not already in love when you see the film, you'll desperately want to be afterwards."

== Soundtrack ==
The film was initially titled after the Curtis Mayfield song, The Makings of You. For the 2020 re-cut version, the film title changed to reflect another song title, Never My Love. The soundtrack supervisors are Carlos Niño and Eothen Allapat of Now-Again Records and features lush instrumentals with Miguel Atwood-Ferguson, obscure psychedelic rock and R&B music from bands like Ofege and Witch.

It's been praised for its spectacular soundtrack, for its gritty, otherworldly atmosphere, and for its surprising love story—revolving around middle-aged blue-collar characters—that spirals out into something much larger.
