= Alone Together (Tony Bennett album) =

Studio album by Tony Bennett
- Released: July 11, 1961
- Recorded: February 28 – March 1, 1960
- Studio: CBS 30th Street (New York City)
- Genre: Vocal jazz
- Length: 42:10
- Label: Columbia; CL 1471; CS 8262

Tony Bennett chronology
Tony Sings for Two (1961)	Alone Together (1961)	Sings a String of Harold Arlen (1961)

Professional ratings
Review scores
Source	Rating
New Record Mirror	4/5

Alone Together is an album by American singer Tony Bennett. It was originally released in 1961 on Columbia as CL 1471. It almost exclusively features string arrangements of standards, with a choir, harp accompaniment and sparse percussion in places. It is among the most obscure Bennett recordings. So far, it has been released on CD only in Japan by Sony/CBS.

On November 8, 2011, Sony Music Distribution included the CD in a box set entitled The Complete Collection.

== Track listing ==
1. "Alone Together" (Arthur Schwartz, Howard Dietz) – 3:07
2. "This Is All I Ask" (Gordon Jenkins) – 4:12
3. "Out of This World" (Harold Arlen, Johnny Mercer) – 3:37
4. "Walk in the Country" (Bart Howard) – 3:46
5. "I'm Always Chasing Rainbows" (Harry Carroll, Joseph McCarthy) – 2:46
6. "Poor Butterfly" (Raymond Hubbell, John Golden) – 3:41
7. "After You've Gone" (Henry Creamer, Turner Layton) – 3:57
8. "Gone With the Wind" (Allie Wrubel, Herb Magidson) – 3:34
9. "It's Magic" (Sammy Cahn, Jule Styne) – 3:17
10. "How Long Has This Been Going On?" (George Gershwin, Ira Gershwin) – 3:52
11. "Sophisticated Lady" (Duke Ellington, Mitchell Parish, Irving Mills) – 3:00
12. "For Heaven's Sake" (Elise Bretton, Sherwin Edwards, Don Meyer) – 3:21

Recorded on February 28 (#1, 5, 11), February 29 (#6, 7–8, 10, 12) and March 1 (#2–4, 9), 1960.

== Personnel ==
- Tony Bennett – vocals
- Frank DeVol – conductor, arranger
- Unspecified string section
