= Jay Landers =

Jay Landers is an American record producer, songwriter, A&R executive, music publisher and writer of liner notes best known for his work with Barbra Streisand.

Landers' A&R and executive producer projects have been nominated for more than 30 Grammy, Emmy, and Academy Awards. He has held the position of A&R at Columbia Records, Walt Disney Records, Universal Music Group, and EMI.

== Early life ==
Landers was born in Los Angeles, California. His father, Hal Landers, was a music publisher, record label executive and co-owner of Dunhill Records and Mums Records. Jay Landers describes how his father influenced the different roles in his career: "He taught me not to be limited by one title or job. I learned to follow whatever areas of the business which seemed to hold the most promise or which were the most interesting".

Landers formed a rock band in high school and started a weekly music newsletter called "Disc-ussions". He started working part-time for Don Cornelius and Dick Griffey, stapling concert posters on telephone poles. Landers also worked at his father's publishing company as a song plugger.

The Landers family lived in the Beverly Hills Post Office area in a World War II-era, Arts and Crafts style bungalow that was renovated by architect Steven Erhlich. In 2004, Jay Landers bought the house back, living there with his wife and daughter until 2018.

== Career ==
=== Work as publisher ===
Landers entered the music business as a music publisher, pitching songs to record producers including Russ Titelman, Lenny Waronker and Richard Perry. Landers pitched songs at The Entertainment Company which lead to recordings by Barbra Streisand, Diana Ross, Smokey Robinson, Stephanie Mills, Angela Bofill, among others.

In an interview with the Malibu Times, Jay Landers explained his experience as an A&R man working with artists including Frank Sinatra, Madonna, Sting, Julio Iglesias and Josh Groban:

“I’ve had (...) a front row seat watching some of the greatest artists in the world do their thing. To sit there and be able to hear their voice in its purity without any echo or instrumentation is a great thrill. Working in A&R means finding the right song for the right artist and also the right artist for the right project. For artists that don’t write their own songs, guys like me still have value because we help them find their material."

=== Columbia Records ===
In 1986, Landers stepped into the role of Director A&R & Soundtracks at Columbia Records. In 1993, he became the A&R for the Barbra Streisand album Back to Broadway. Upon his promotion to Vice President of A&R, Landers relocated to New York, continuing his work with Streisand, Neil Diamond, James Taylor, Peabo Bryson, and others.

Landers brought the songs “Beauty and the Beast” from the Disney film and “A Whole New World” from Aladdin to Peabo Bryson after Barbra Streisand turned them down. Celine Dion and Peabo Bryson's “Beauty and the Beast” charted at No. 9 on Billboard's Hot 100 in 1992. “A Whole New World,” by Bryson and Regina Belle reached No. 1 on Billboard's Hot 100 in 1993. Both songs won Grammy and Academy Awards.

Landers was the music supervisor on the 1992 film A League of Their Own, directed by Penny Marshall and starring Madonna and Tom Hanks, with the opening song written by Carole King.

=== EMI ===
In 1992, Landers reunited with Charles Koppelman, then EMI Chairman, joining the company as Senior Vice President of A&R. Landers continued his role as executive producer of Columbia artists Streisand, Diamond, and Julio Iglesias. Landers was A&R on Frank Sinatra's final studio album Duets.

=== Walt Disney Records ===
Landers returned to Los Angeles in 2000 as Senior Vice President of A&R at Walt Disney Records, working on varied projects including soundtracks, teen music, Broadway cast albums and theme park music. Landers worked on the soundtracks for the Disney films Beauty and the Beast, Aladdin, Finding Nemo, The Lizzie McGuire Movie, and The Princess Diaries.

Other Disney projects include "Monsters, Inc.", "That's So Raven", the Hilary Duff album, the Broadway cast album for Aida, and music for Disney Channel.

=== Work with Barbra Streisand ===
Landers has worked consistently with Barbra Streisand since 1991, and executive produced 31 of her albums. Other roles on Streisand recordings include A&R, music producer, songwriter, and writer of liner notes. Engineer David Reitzas describes Landers' role on Streisand's projects as "the middle man between Streisand and the technical crew."

He is co-writer of the songs "What's On My Mind", "Don't Lie To Me", "Better Angels", "Love's Never Wrong", "The Rain Will Fall" and "Take Care of This House" on her Walls album, a politically themed record inspired by her feelings about Donald Trump.

During her Back To Brooklyn concert, Streisand performed the Cole Porter song “You're the Top”, with additional new lyrics written by Jay Landers and Charlie Midnight in a wry style, in honor of Streisand performing at the Barclays Center in Brooklyn, her hometown.

Landers was co-writer and music supervisor of the Netflix Streisand concert film Barbra: The Music, The Mem'ries, The Magic and appears in the film.

=== Work writing liner notes ===
Landers has written the liner notes for 15 Barbra Streisand albums, 3 Johnny Mathis albums and 3 Bette Midler albums. In an interview with babranews.com, Landers said about his work as liner note writer: “I want to share with the listener what it was like to be at the session; it’s really that simple. Shedding light on the brilliance of her [Streisand’s] process, hopefully, enhances the enjoyment of the music. His goal is to “elevate the listening experience, by describing in facts and in more cerebral, impressionistic ways, what the artist and the music was like.”

=== Songwriter ===
Landers has written songs for Streisand, Bette Midler, Kristin Chenoweth, Katharine McPhee, Big Time Rush, Bianca Ryan, and Ruben Studdard, in addition to soundtrack work for Hannah Montana, Finding Nemo, and The Princess Diaries.

Landers wrote the lead single “Don't Lie to Me” for the Streisand album Walls. He co-wrote “Living In The Moment” end credit song for the film The Book Club.

For the Bette Midler holiday album Cool Yule, Landers added specially revised lyrics for “From A Distance (Christmas version)”. He also provided lyrics for “Home On Christmas Day” for Chenoweth.
