= Bob Funk =

- Directed by: Craig Carlisle
- Written by: Craig Carlisle
- Produced by: Keith Kjarval; Kurt Rauer; Tim Montijo
- Starring: Rachael Leigh Cook; Grace Zabriskie; Amy Ryan
- Cinematography: Lisa Wiegand
- Edited by: Josh Beal
- Music by: Tim Montijo
- Release date: March 20, 2009
- Running time: 106 minutes 108 minutes
- Country: United States
- Language: English

Bob Funk is a 2009 American comedy drama film written and directed by Craig Carlisle and starring Rachael Leigh Cook, Grace Zabriskie and Amy Ryan.

== Cast ==
- Michael Leydon Campbell as Bob Funk
- Rachael Leigh Cook as Ms. Thorne
- Grace Zabriskie as Mrs. Funk
- Amy Ryan as Ms. Wright
- Eddie Jemison as Ron Funk
- Stephen Root as Steve
- Alex Désert as Sonny
- Ron Canada as Smiley
- Lucy Davis as Janet
- Nadia Dajani as Jean
- Terri Mann as Dr. Day

== Reception ==
The film has a 17% rating on Rotten Tomatoes based on twelve reviews.

Robert Koehler of Variety gave the film a negative review and wrote, "Carlisle’s film is designed with a certain suburban flatness that at times perfectly reflects Bob’s inner deadness, though not his periodic spurts of sarcastic rage."

Adam Keleman of Slant Magazine awarded the film one star out of four and wrote, "Playing the misogynistic, bar-hopping, impulsive, titular irritant, Campbell’s thespy histrionics come off as truly labored..."

Tyler Foster of DVD Talk gave the film a mixed review and wrote, "Half a good film, mediocre video, dry audio and no extras, and yet I still can't bring myself to slap a skip it onto this release."
