= Tony Sings for Two =

Studio album by Tony Bennett
- Released: February 6, 1961
- Recorded: October 28, 1959
- Studio: CBS 30th Street (New York City)
- Genre: Vocal jazz
- Length: 33:35
- Label: Columbia; CL 1446; CS 8242
- Producer: Mitch Miller

Tony Bennett chronology
To My Wonderful One (1960)	Tony Sings for Two (1961)	Alone Together (1961)

Professional ratings
Review scores
Source	Rating
Allmusic	4/5 stars

Tony Sings for Two is a 1961 studio album by Tony Bennett, accompanied by the pianist Ralph Sharon. With Bill Evans, Bennett would make two further albums accompanied by solo piano.

On November 8, 2011, Sony Music Distribution included the CD in a box set entitled The Complete Collection.

== Track listing ==
1. "I Didn't Know What Time It Was" (Richard Rodgers, Lorenz Hart) – 1:24
2. "Bewitched, Bothered and Bewildered" (Rodgers, Hart) – 2:30
3. "Nobody's Heart" (Rodgers, Hart) – 2:08
4. "I'm Thru with Love" (Gus Kahn, Fud Livingston, Matty Malneck) – 3:15
5. "My Funny Valentine" (Rodgers, Hart) – 2:36
6. "The Man That Got Away" (Harold Arlen, Ira Gershwin) – 3:52
7. "Where or When" (Rodgers, Hart) – 2:09
8. "A Sleepin' Bee" (Arlen, Truman Capote) – 3:23
9. "Happiness Is a Thing Called Joe" (Arlen, Yip Harburg) – 2:20
10. "Mam'selle" (Mack Gordon, Edmund Goulding) – 2:40
11. "Just Friends" (John Klenner, Sam M. Lewis) – 1:36
12. "Street of Dreams" (Lewis, Victor Young) – 2:11
13. "Skylark" (Hoagy Carmichael, Johnny Mercer) – 2:31 Bonus track on CD reissue

== Personnel ==
- Tony Bennett – vocals
- Ralph Sharon – piano
