= Lover, Come Back to Me =

1928 song

Song
- Published: 1928 by Harms/M. Witmark & Sons
- Composer: Sigmund Romberg
- Lyricist: Oscar Hammerstein II

"Lover, Come Back to Me" is a popular song composed by Sigmund Romberg with lyrics by Oscar Hammerstein II for the 1928 production of the Broadway show The New Moon, in which the song was introduced by Evelyn Herbert and Robert Halliday (as Robert Misson).

The song was written and added to the musical during a thorough reworking of The New Moon following a poorly reviewed production which played for one week in Philadelphia at the end of 1927. The producers revamped the show for a year before mounting it anew in New York City. Hammerstein expressed great sadness in the song's words; he was emotional because his married paramour, Dorothy Jacobsen, told him she was cutting off the relationship. (Later they patched things up, divorced their spouses, and married each other the next year.) Romberg's music was a complex line which he believed was the main attraction of the song.

The song has become popular as a jazz standard, sung by people of every vocal range and style. Its lyrics are often changed by the performer, and the tempo can vary widely. For instance, Gogi Grant's slow refrain takes 150 seconds, while Barbra Streisand's peppy live rendition covers the refrain in 57 seconds.

== Film ==
The song was performed by Lawrence Tibbett and Grace Moore in New Moon, the 1930 film adaptation of the stage musical, and by Jeanette MacDonald and Nelson Eddy in the 1940 film adaptation, also titled New Moon.

== Mildred Bailey ==
The American blues singer Mildred Bailey recorded the song several times from 1938 to 1947. Her version became a standard against which others were judged. She kept true to the original words in 1938 but made various changes in later recordings, perhaps because she did not have the words in front of her.

== Billie Holiday ==
The American jazz singer Billie Holiday is strongly associated with the song. She first recorded it in 1944 staying faithful to the original words. In 1951, she changed the song to be in the present tense, and in 1952 she made another studio recording retaining this change. Other singers have copied her modifications, including Chris Connor, Sam Cooke, Connie Evingson and Lily Frost.

== Dinah Washington ==
The American jazz singer and pianist Dinah Washington recorded the song at a fast tempo, and she repeated the words of stanza number 2 in place of stanza number 4, and reprised stanza number 3, putting her mark on this unique version. Even with these changes, Washington kept the basic storyline, starting in the past and ending in the present.

== Barbra Streisand ==
"Lover, Come Back to Me"

Single by Barbra Streisand

from the album The Second Barbra Streisand Album
- A-side: "My Coloring Book"
- Released: November 23, 1962
- Recorded: 1962
- Studio: Columbia 30th Street Studio, New York City
- Label: Columbia
- Composer: Sigmund Romberg
- Lyricist: Oscar Hammerstein II
- Producer: Mike Berniker

Barbra Streisand singles chronology
"Happy Days Are Here Again" / "When the Sun Comes Out" (1962)	"My Coloring Book" / "Lover, Come Back to Me" (1962)	"People" / "I Am Woman" (1964)

Arranged and conducted by George Williams, Barbra Streisand released her version of the song as her second single in November 1962—a double single with "My Coloring Book" on the flip side. Produced by Mike Berniker, and recorded before Streisand's first album sessions, the single was sent to radio.

In 1963, Streisand re-recorded the song for her second album The Second Barbra Streisand Album, which appeared on the compilation The Essential Barbra Streisand. In her first television special, My Name is Barbra, she performed a bitterly jubilant version of the song. In 2000, she performed the song on her Timeless Tour, and a live recording was included on the live album Timeless: Live in Concert and the DVD.

== Other notable recordings ==
- Arden-Ohman Orchestra (Victor, 1929) – Joel Whitburn estimates this recording would have charted at No. 6 if the Billboard Hot 100 had existed.
- Paul Whiteman and his Orchestra (Columbia, 1929) – Joel Whitburn estimates this recording would have charted at No. 3 if the Billboard Hot 100 had existed.
- Perry Askam (Victor, 1930) – Joel Whitburn estimates this recording would have charted at No. 20 if the Billboard Hot 100 had existed.
- Artie Shaw – a major instrumental hit record for Shaw, recorded 17 January 1939 for Victor Records and released on their subsidiary Bluebird record label as the "A" side of record number B-10126. Shaw had risen from almost total obscurity less than six months earlier, to having won the Downbeat Magazine Annual Reader's Poll at the end of 1938, and was leading the preeminent swing band in the US throughout 1939, recording numerous hits and dominating record charts as a popular and jazz artist. He performed the song regularly throughout his career until his retirement as a performing clarinetist and bandleader in 1954.
- Nat King Cole – a single in 1953 which reached the Billboard charts, peaking at No. 16
- Ella Fitzgerald sang the song at a fast tempo for her 1955 album Sweet and Hot.
- Gogi Grant, a pop singer from Philadelphia, included the song on her 1959 album Torch Time. Her reading is among the slowest.
- The Jazz saxophonist John Coltrane recorded the song in 1958 for his 1964 album Black Pearls. Joined by trumpeter Donald Byrd, pianist Red Garland, bassist Paul Chambers and drummer Art Taylor, Coltrane sets a very fast pace for this instrumental version.
- The jazz singer Cassandra Wilson included the song on her 2008 album Loverly. Wilson changes the lyrics in the manner of Mildred Bailey.

== See also ==
- List of 1920s jazz standards
