= Jay R. Ferguson =

American actor

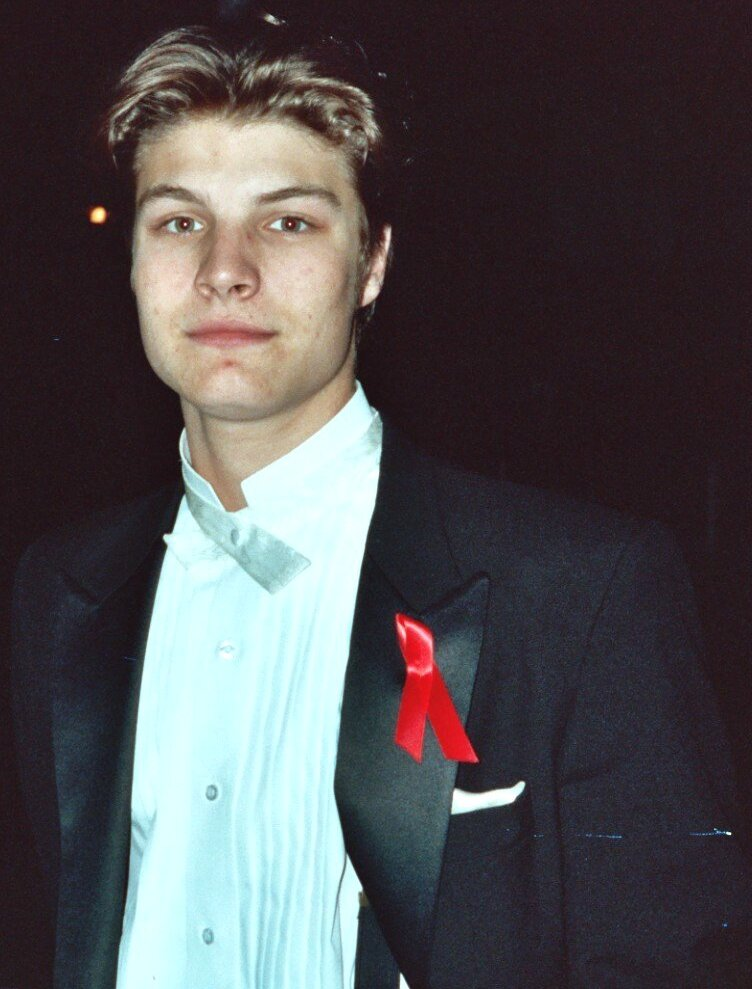
- Ferguson at the 44th Primetime Emmy Awards in 1992
- Born: Jay Rowland Ferguson Jr. July 25, 1974 (age 52); Dallas, Texas, U.S.
- Occupation: Actor
- Years active: 1990–present
- Spouse: Lorena Ruiz
- Children: 3

Jay Rowland Ferguson Jr. (born July 25, 1974) is an American actor. He is known as Taylor Newton in Evening Shade (1990–1994), Stan Rizzo in Mad Men (2010–2015), Ben Olinsky in The Conners (2018–2025) and Pastor Tom on Leanne (1 episode in 2025)

== Biography ==
Ferguson was born in Dallas, Texas. In 1990, he played Ponyboy Curtis in the television series adaptation of S. E. Hinton's novel The Outsiders.

His notable television roles include Taylor Newton in four seasons of the CBS sitcom Evening Shade, Dr. Todd Hooper on Judging Amy, Rich Connelly in the 2005 NBC television series Surface, Agent Warren Russell on the Showtime series Sleeper Cell, Stan Rizzo on the AMC series Mad Men, and as Pat O'Neal, the father of the O'Neal family in the ABC series The Real O'Neals.

His film roles include Billy in Higher Learning, Elmer Conway in The Killer Inside Me, and Keith Clayton in The Lucky One.

In 2018, he played Chip Curry in the CBS sitcom Living Biblically. From 2018 to 2025, he played Ben Olinsky, the second husband of Darlene Conner (Sara Gilbert) on the ABC sitcom The Conners.

== Filmography ==
=== Film ===
| Year | Title | Role | Notes |
|---|---|---|---|
| 1995 | Higher Learning | Billy | |
| 1997 | Campfire Tales | Cliff | |
| 1997 | Pink as the Day She Was Born | Brad | |
| 1998 | Girl | Parker Blackman | |
| 1999 | Blue Ridge Fall | Shane | |
| 2000 | The In Crowd | Andy | |
| 2001 | Hollywood Palms | Riley | |
| 2002 | The Year That Trembled | Isaac Hoskins | |
| 2006 | Passengers | Edsel | Short film |
| 2006 | Spreading the News | Sampson | Short film |
| 2010 | The Killer Inside Me | Elmer Conway | |
| 2012 | The Lucky One | Keith Clayton | |
| 2014 | Back in the Day | Mark | |
| 2014 | The Makings of You | Wallis | a.k.a. Never My Love |
| 2015 | Little Loopers | Todd | |
| 2015 | Club Life | Steven | |
| 2015 | The Last Dispensation of St. James | Roth | Short film |

=== Television films ===
| Year | Title | Role | Notes |
|---|---|---|---|
| 1990 | Shattered Dreams | Teenage Luke | |
| 1995 | The Price of Love | Beau | |

=== Television series ===
| Year | Title | Role | Notes |
|---|---|---|---|
| 1990 | The Outsiders | Ponyboy Curtis | 13 episodes |
| 1990–1994 | Evening Shade | Taylor Newton | 98 episodes |
| 2002 | Glory Days | Sheriff Rudy Dunlop | 9 episodes |
| 2003–2004 | Judging Amy | Dr. Todd Hooper | 8 episodes |
| 2005 | Medium | Tommy Lahaine | Episode: "Lucky" |
| 2005–2006 | Surface | Richard Connelly | 15 episodes |
| 2006 | Sleeper Cell | Case Agent Warren Russell | 6 episodes |
| 2008 | CSI: Miami | Larry Hopkins | Episode: "Raising Caine" |
| 2008–2009 | Easy Money | Cooper Buffkin | 8 episodes |
| 2009 | Weeds | Keith | Episode: "Machete Up Top" |
| 2009 | Lie to Me | Jimmy | Episode: "Grievous Bodily Harm" |
| 2010 | Castle | Dick Coonan | Episode: "Sucker Punch" |
| 2010 | Ghost Whisperer | Gil Bradley | Episode: "Lethal Combination" |
| 2010–2015 | Mad Men | Stan Rizzo | 39 episodes Nominated—Screen Actors Guild Award for Outstanding Performance by an Ensemble in a Drama Series (2013, 2016) |
| 2011 | No Ordinary Family | Agent Norris | Episode: "No Ordinary Future" |
| 2011 | Burn Notice | John O'Lear | Episode: "Besieged" |
| 2012 | The Unknown | Chef Nick Morrietti | Episode: "Prime Cut" |
| 2013 | Ray Donovan | FBI Agent Thomas Volcheck | Episode: "Bucky Fuckn' Dent" |
| 2015 | Chasing Life | Owen Gordon | 3 episodes |
| 2016–2017 | The Real O'Neals | Pat O'Neal | 29 episodes |
| 2016 | The Mindy Project | Drew Schakowsky | 3 episodes |
| 2016 | Comedy Bang! Bang! | Paul Bunyan | Episode: "Kaley Cuoco Wears a Black Blazer and Slip on Sneakers" |
| 2017 | Twin Peaks | Special Agent Randall Headley | 4 episodes |
| 2018 | The Assassination of Gianni Versace: American Crime Story | FBI Agent Keith Evans | 2 episodes |
| 2018 | Living Biblically | Chip | 13 episodes |
| 2018 | The Romanoffs | Joe Garner | Episode: "End of the Line" |
| 2018–2025 | The Conners | Ben Olinsky | Series regular |
| 2019–2020 | Briarpatch | Jake Spivey | 10 episodes |
| 2025 | Leanne | Pastor Tom | 1 episode |
