= A Sleepin' Bee =

American popular song

"A Sleepin' Bee" is a popular song composed by Harold Arlen with lyrics by Arlen and Truman Capote. It was introduced in the musical House of Flowers (1954) and performed by Diahann Carroll. While House of Flowers was a flop, "A Sleepin' Bee" became a standard of the American songbook.

Barbra Streisand referred to it as her favorite song, recorded it several times, and performed it in her national television debut in April 1961 on the "Jack Paar Show".

Mel Tormé's performance of the song in Mel Tormé Swings Shubert Alley was called "definitive" in The Penguin Guide to Jazz.

== Selected recordings ==
- Ernestine Anderson - Ernestine Anderson (1958)
- Carmen McRae - on the album Something to Swing About (1960)
- June Christy - Off-Beat (1960)
- Carol Lawrence - on the album Tonight at 8:30 (1960)
- Mel Tormé - on the album Mel Tormé Swings Shubert Alley (1960)
- Nancy Wilson - Nancy Wilson/Cannonball Adderley (1961)
- Tony Bennett - on the album Tony Sings for Two (1961)
- Julie Andrews - Broadway's Fair Julie (1962)
- Barbra Streisand - on the album The Barbra Streisand Album (1963)
- Bill Evans - numerous versions including Trio 64 and Montreaux Jazz Festival
- Johnny Hartman - I Just Dropped By to Say Hello (1963)
- Leontyne Price – Leontyne Price and Andre Previn (1967)
- Jessye Norman - With a Song in My Heart (1990)
- Cassandra Wilson - Loverly (2008)
