= Keepin' Out of Mischief Now =

1932 song by Fats Waller and Andy Razaf

"Keepin' Out of Mischief Now" is a 1932 song composed by Fats Waller with lyrics by Andy Razaf. It was recorded by Louis Armstrong in March 1932.

== Other recordings ==
- In 1957 Dinah Washington included it on her album Dinah Washington Sings Fats Waller.
- In 1963 it was covered by Barbra Streisand on her debut album.
- In 1965, it was recorded by Sammy Davis Jr. with Count Basie, for the album,Our Shining Hour
