= Don't Lie to Me =

- Screenshot of the music video "Don't Lie to Me"

Single by Barbra Streisand

from the album Walls
- Released: September 28, 2018
- Genre: Vocal pop
- Length: 3:57
- Label: Columbia
- Songwriters: Barbra Streisand; John Shanks; Myrin; Landers
- Producers: Shanks; Myrin

Barbra Streisand singles chronology
"At the Ballet" (2016)	"Don't Lie to Me" (2018)	"Imagine/What a Wonderful World" (2018)

"Don't Lie to Me" is a song by American singer-songwriter Barbra Streisand. It was released as the lead single from her 2018 album Walls. It criticizes the presidency of Donald Trump. A remix by Dave Audé spent twelve weeks on the US Dance Club chart.

== Production ==
"I just can't stand what's going on. His assault on our democracy, our institutions, our founders — I think we're in a fight. ... We're in a war for the soul of America."

— Barbra Streisand to The Star

The song was released on the 2018 album Walls, the first featuring primarily new material since 2005. Co-written by the singer, Streisand felt a need to write the song to help her cope with the Trump administration. "Don't Lie To Me" is the album's first single. It was inspired by a road trip when Streisand was listening to the radio and becoming disgusted by the content of the news. She originally wanted to create a subtle song, but ended up writing "bombastic" lyrics.

== Composition ==
The song, written by Streisand, John Shanks, Jonas Myrin and Jay Landers, is "grand, lush and heavily orchestrated". Billboard described it as an "impassioned, dramatic ballad with pointed barbs". The piece has a "bombastic string-laden backing".

== Reception ==
Billboard deemed the song "grand and politically charged".

== Charts ==
Chart performance for "Don't Lie to Me"
Chart (2019)	Peak position
US Dance Club Songs (Billboard)	8
