= The Third Album (Barbra Streisand album) =

Studio album by Barbra Streisand
- Released: February 1964
- Recorded: January 29, 1963; October 30, 1963; November 20, 1963; January 6, 1964
- Studios: Columbia 7th Ave, New York City; Columbia 30th Street, New York City
- Genre: Traditional pop
- Length: 30:49
- Label: Columbia
- Producer: Mike Berniker

Barbra Streisand chronology
The Second Barbra Streisand Album (1963)	The Third Album (1964)	Funny Girl (Original Broadway Cast Recording) (1964)

The Third Album is the third solo studio album by American singer Barbra Streisand, released in February 1964. By 1966, the album sold over one million copies worldwide.

== Artwork ==
The photograph on the album cover was taken by actor Roddy McDowall when Streisand was performing on The Judy Garland Show in October 1963.

== Critical reception ==
Professional ratings
Review scores
Source	Rating
Allmusic	link
Record Mirror	4/5 stars
Tom Hull – on the Web	B−

AllMusic gave the album a retrospective three (out of five) stars, and called it "another demonstration of the beauty of Barbra Streisand's voice, also suggested that her interpretive abilities remained limited."

== Commercial performance ==
After the success of Streisand's previous two albums, The Barbra Streisand Album and The Second Barbra Streisand Album, it was expected that The Third Album would do as well. The album turned out to be very successful; it reached #5 on Billboard's Pop Albums Chart and was certified Gold by the RIAA. It stayed on the Billboard 200 for 74 weeks.

== Song information ==
- "My Melancholy Baby" was first performed by William Frawley in 1912.
- "Just in Time" was introduced in the musical Bells Are Ringing. The arrangement on this LP makes use of the Prelude from J.S. Bach's "Prelude and Fugue in C Major" from the Well-Tempered Clavier.
- "Taking a Chance on Love" was introduced by Ethel Waters in the musical Cabin In The Sky.
- "Bewitched, Bothered and Bewildered" was introduced in the musical Pal Joey.
- "Never Will I Marry" was introduced by Anthony Perkins in the 1960 musical Greenwillow.
- "As Time Goes By" was introduced in the musical Everybody's Welcome, and featured in the 1942 film Casablanca.
- "It Had to Be You" was first published in 1924.
- "Make Believe" was introduced in the musical Show Boat.
- "I Had Myself a True Love" was introduced in the 1946 musical St. Louis Woman.

== Track listing ==
Side One
No.	Title	Writer(s)	Length
1.	"My Melancholy Baby"	Ernie Burnett, George A. Norton, Maybelle E. Watson	3:02
2.	"Just in Time"	lyrics: Betty Comden and Adolph Green; music: Jule Styne	2:16
3.	"Taking a Chance on Love"	Vernon Duke, Ted Fetter, John Latouche	2:34
4.	"Bewitched, Bothered and Bewildered"	Lorenz Hart, Richard Rodgers	2:54
5.	"Never Will I Marry"	Frank Loesser	2:27

Side Two
No.	Title	Writer(s)	Length
1.	"As Time Goes By"	Herman Hupfeld	3:46
2.	"Draw Me a Circle"	Cy Young	2:15
3.	"It Had to Be You"	music: Isham Jones; lyrics: Gus Kahn	3:46
4.	"Make Believe"	Oscar Hammerstein II, Jerome Kern	2:41
5.	"I Had Myself a True Love"	Harold Arlen, Johnny Mercer	4:23

== Personnel ==
- Barbra Streisand – vocals
- Mike Berniker – producer
- Ray Ellis, Sid Ramin, Peter Daniels, Peter Matz – arrangements, conductor
- Frank Laico, Ted Brosnan – recording engineer
- Roddy McDowall – cover photography from The Judy Garland Show, October 1963
- Sammy Cahn – liner notes

== Chart positions ==
=== Weekly charts ===
Chart	Peak position
US Billboard 200	5
US Cashbox Top Albums	4

== Certifications and sales ==
Region	Certification	Certified units/sales
United States (RIAA)	Gold	500,000^{^}
Summaries
Worldwide as of 1966	—	1,000,000
^{^} Shipments figures based on certification alone.
