= Sings a String of Harold Arlen =

Studio album by Tony Bennett
- Released: 1961
- Recorded: August 15 & 17–18, 1960
- Studio: CBS 30th Street (New York City)
- Genre: Vocal jazz, traditional pop
- Length: 44:00
- Label: Columbia; CL 1559; CS 8359
- Producer: Ernie Altschuler

Tony Bennett chronology
Alone Together (1961)	Sings a String of Harold Arlen (1961)	My Heart Sings (1961)

Professional ratings
Review scores
Source	Rating
Allmusic	3/5 stars

Sings a String of Harold Arlen is a 1961 studio album by Tony Bennett. It consists of string arrangements of songs composed by Harold Arlen. The illustration on the cover is by Bob Peak.

On November 8, 2011, Sony Music Distribution included the CD in a box set entitled The Complete Collection.

== Track listing ==
All music composed by Harold Arlen, lyricists indicated.

1. "When the Sun Comes Out" (Ted Koehler) – 2:44
2. "Over the Rainbow" (Yip Harburg) – 4:02
3. "House of Flowers" (Truman Capote) – 3:35
4. "Come Rain or Come Shine" (Johnny Mercer) – 3:34
5. "For Every Man There's a Woman" (Leo Robin) – 3:16
6. "Let's Fall in Love" (Koehler) – 4:35
7. "Right as the Rain" (Harburg) – 3:30
8. "It Was Written in the Stars" (Robin) – 2:56
9. "What Good Does It Do" (Harburg) – 4:10
10. "Fun to Be Fooled" (Ira Gershwin, Harburg) – 3:50
11. "This Time the Dream's on Me" (Mercer) – 3:11
12. "I've Got the World on a String" (Koehler) – 4:37

Recorded on August 15 (#2-4, 6), August 17 (#1, 5, 7-8, 12) and August 18 (#9-11), 1960.

== Personnel ==
- Tony Bennett – vocals
- Glenn Osser – arranger, conductor
