= Walls (Barbra Streisand album) =

Studio album by Barbra Streisand
- Released: November 2, 2018
- Recorded: November 2017–September 2018
- Studio: Barbra Streisand Scoring Stage (Culver City California); Blue Studio (Malibu, California); Capitol (Hollywood, California); Grandma's House (Malibu, California); Henson Recording (Los Angeles, California); Multiview Studios (Hollywood, California); Sound Design (Santo Barbara, California); Sound Emporium (Nashville, Tennessee); The Gentlemen's Club Studio (Nashville, Tennessee); WallyWorld Studio (Los Angeles, California)
- Genre: Vocal pop
- Length: 47:09
- Label: Columbia
- Producer: Walter Afanasieff; Desmond Child; David Foster; Jonas Myrin; John Shanks; Barbra Streisand

Barbra Streisand chronology
The Music...The Mem'ries...The Magic! (2017)	Walls (2018)	Release Me 2 (2021)

Singles from Walls
- 1. "Don't Lie to Me" Released: September 28, 2018; 2. "Imagine/What a Wonderful World" Released: October 12, 2018; 3. "Lady Liberty" Released: October 26, 2018

Walls is the thirty-sixth studio album by American singer-songwriter Barbra Streisand, released on November 2, 2018, by Columbia Records. The lead single "Don't Lie to Me" was written as a criticism of America's political climate amid the presidency of Donald Trump, while the title track alludes to Trump's frequent calls for a wall at the Mexico border. Receiving critical acclaim, the album debuted at number 12 on the US Billboard 200.

== Critical reception ==
Professional ratings
Aggregate scores
Source	Rating
Metacritic	84/100
Review scores
Source	Rating
AllMusic	4/5 stars
The Guardian	4/5 stars
The Independent	4/5 stars
The Times	2/5 stars

Walls received acclaim from music critics. At Metacritic, which assigns a normalized rating out of 100 to reviews from mainstream critics, Walls has an average score of 84 based on 5 reviews.

Walls was nominated for Best Traditional Pop Vocal Album at the 62nd Annual Grammy Awards.

Year-end lists

Publication	Accolade	Ref.
Rolling Stone	The 20 Best Pop Albums of 2018	

== Commercial performance ==
Walls debuted at number 12 on the US Billboard 200 but then dropped off the charts after a second week. Walls opened at number six on the UK Albums Chart, selling 15,604 copies and giving Streisand her 36th top-75 album and 15th top-10 entry in the United Kingdom. In Australia Walls debuted at number seven on the ARIA Albums Chart.

== Track listing ==
Adapted from Playbill.

No.	Title	Writer(s)	Producer(s)	Length
1.	"What's on My Mind"	Barbra Streisand; Carole Bayer Sager; Jonas Myrin; Jay Landers	Walter Afanasieff; Streisand	5:16
2.	"Don't Lie to Me"	Streisand; John Shanks; Myrin; Landers	Shanks; Myrin	3:57
3.	"Imagine/What a Wonderful World"	John Lennon; Yoko Ono; Bob Thiele; George David Weiss	Afanasieff; Streisand	5:20
4.	"Walls"	Afanasieff; Alan Bergman; Marilyn Bergman	Afanasieff; Streisand	3:54
5.	"Lady Liberty"	Desmond Child	Child; Streisand	3:52
6.	"What the World Needs Now"	Burt Bacharach; Hal David	Afanasieff; Streisand	4:36
7.	"Better Angels"	Bayer Sager; Myrin; Landers	David Foster; Myrin	4:08
8.	"Love's Never Wrong"	Steve Dorff; Marty Panzer; Landers	Afanasieff; Streisand	4:06
9.	"The Rain Will Fall"	Streisand; Myrin; Charlie Midnight; Landers	Shanks; Myrin	4:42
10.	"Take Care of This House" (from 1600 Pennsylvania Avenue)	Leonard Bernstein; Alan Jay Lerner; Landers; David Pack	Streisand	4:10
11.	"Happy Days Are Here Again"	Milton Ager; Jack Yellen	Streisand	3:53
Total length:				47:09

== Personnel ==
Adapted from AllMusic.

- Walter Afanasieff – arranger, keyboards, orchestral arrangements, producer, synthesizer
- Tariqh Akoni – acoustic guitar
- Leo Amuedo – acoustic guitar
- Annie Bosko – background vocals
- Adrian Bradford – engineer
- Jorge Calandrelli – orchestral arrangements
- David Campbell – string arrangements
- Mabvuto Carpenter – background vocals
- Desmond Child – keyboards, producer, programming
- Steve Churchyard – orchestration recording
- Tim Davis – choir director
- Nathan East – bass guitar
- Kenneth Edmonds – vocals
- David Foster – arranger, producer
- Ian Fraser – arranger
- Dmytro Gordon – engineer
- Tyler Gordon – engineer
- Mark Graham – music preparation
- Keith Gretlein – engineer, programming
- Missi Hale – background vocals
- Jeri Heiden – design
- Russell James – photography
- Jay Landers – executive producer, liner notes
- Whitney Martin – music contractor
- Michael McDonald – vocals
- Vlado Meller – mastering
- Shawn Murphy – orchestration recording
- Jonas Myrin – arranger, associate producer, background vocals
- Obie O'Brien – orchestration recording
- J.C. Monterrosa – orchestration recording
- Clay Perry – arranger, keyboards, programming
- Tim Pierce – electric guitar
- Tiffany Plamer – background vocals
- William Ross – adaptation, arranger, orchestral arrangements
- John Shanks – bass, guitar, keyboards, producer, programming, background vocals
- Blake Slatkin – keyboards, programming
- Barbra Streisand – arranger, art direction, executive producer, primary artist, producer
- Shari Sutcliffe – music contractor
- Mary Webster – score coordinator
- Kris Wilkinson – music contractor
- Lucy Woodward – background vocals
- Gina Zimmitti – music contractor

== Charts ==
Walls became Streisand's first studio album not to reach the top ten since Emotion in 1984. As of January 2023, the album is Streisand's fifth studio album not to be certified Gold or Platinum by RIAA.

Chart performance for Walls
Chart (2018)	Peak position
Australian Albums (ARIA)	7
Austrian Albums (Ö3 Austria)	18
Belgian Albums (Ultratop Flanders)	50
Belgian Albums (Ultratop Wallonia)	37
Canadian Albums (Billboard)	33
Czech Albums (ČNS IFPI)	59
Dutch Albums (Album Top 100)	15
French Albums (SNEP)	145
German Albums (Offizielle Top 100)	34
Irish Albums (IRMA)	34
Italian Albums (FIMI)	58
New Zealand Albums (RMNZ)	38
Scottish Albums (OCC)	9
Spanish Albums (PROMUSICAE)	16
Swiss Albums (Schweizer Hitparade)	19
UK Albums (OCC)	6
US Billboard 200	12

== Certifications ==
Certifications for Walls
Region	Certification	Certified units/sales
United Kingdom (BPI)	Silver	60,000^{‡}
^{‡} Sales+streaming figures based on certification alone.
