= Grace Zabriskie =

American actress (born 1941)

- Born: Grace Caplinger; May 17, 1941 (age 85); New Orleans, Louisiana, U.S.
- Occupation: Actress
- Years active: 1978–present
- Spouse: John Dunham MacEachron (m. 1963; died 2011)
- Children: 2 (Note: Both children are deceased.)

Grace Zabriskie (born Caplinger; born May 17, 1941) is an American actress. She is best known for her roles as Sarah Palmer in Twin Peaks (1990–1991; 2017) and its film prequel Twin Peaks: Fire Walk with Me (1992) and Lois Henrickson in Big Love (2006–2011). She is also known for appearing in two other films of Twin Peaks director David Lynch, as Juana Durango in Wild at Heart (1990) and Visitor #1 in Inland Empire (2006), and for her recurring role as Mrs. Ross on Seinfeld (1992, 1996–1998).

Other notable film credits include An Officer and a Gentleman (1982), Drugstore Cowboy (1989), Child's Play 2 (1990), My Own Private Idaho (1991), FernGully: The Last Rainforest (1992), Armageddon (1998), The Grudge (2004), and My Son, My Son, What Have Ye Done? (2009).

== Early life ==
Zabriskie was born in New Orleans, Louisiana, the daughter of Marion Grace (née Zabriskie), of Wyckoff, New Jersey, and Roger Thomas "Tom" Caplinger. Her mother had distant Polish and Dutch ancestry, and was a relative of James Zabriskie, a 19th-century railroad industrialist and early pioneer of California. Zabriskie has said that her family was visited by Tennessee Williams, Gore Vidal and Truman Capote during her childhood. Her father owned the famous French quarter gay bar Cafe Lafitte in Exile.

In the early 1960s, Zabriskie was among a circle of the New Orleans friends of author and Discordianism co-founder Kerry Thornley. At one point, Thornley began work on a novel about her titled Can Grace Come Out and Play? Thornley later claimed to have had an "eight-year-long, off-again-on-again, affair/friendship/rivalry/ego-game/karmic unraveling" with her, but Zabriskie described it as "four and a half minutes in bed" after a discussion on the exclusion of sex from their friendship—shared with Zabriskie's then-husband Rob—as being "irrational".

Her sister, Lane Caplinger, worked as a typist in New Orleans District Attorney Jim Garrison's office. Caplinger is reputed to have covertly produced all five copies of the first edition of the Principia Discordia in 1965.

== Career ==
After making her major film debut in Norma Rae, Zabriskie went on to appear in dozens of other works, including the 1981 Roger Corman horror film Galaxy of Terror and the 1981 miniseries adaptation of John Steinbeck's East of Eden. She played the nanny in The Private Eyes, Debra Winger's mother in An Officer and a Gentleman, Heather Langenkamp's mother in Nickel Mountain, and Paul Le Mat's mother in The Burning Bed (starring Farrah Fawcett). She had a small but crucial part in the fifth season finale of Knots Landing. In 1988, she played Richard Mulligan's love interest "Eva Barrett" on the hit NBC sitcom Empty Nest.

She appeared in 1989's Drugstore Cowboy and as the ill-fated orphanage owner Grace Poole in Child's Play 2. Other movies include the 1991 film adaptation Fried Green Tomatoes and Philip Ridley's 1995 film The Passion of Darkly Noon.

Zabriskie is perhaps most familiar for her television work. After a recurring role on the soap opera Santa Barbara, she appeared on David Lynch's Twin Peaks and its spin-off film, Twin Peaks: Fire Walk with Me as Sarah Palmer, the eerily psychic mother of the doomed Laura Palmer.

Zabriskie also appeared in Lynch's Wild at Heart—notably as the twin sister of a character played by Isabella Rossellini, an actress eleven years her junior. David Lynch later cast her as a sinister Polish neighbor in Inland Empire in 2006.

Zabriskie may best be remembered as Mrs. Ross, a recurring character on the sitcom Seinfeld. She played the mother of another doomed daughter, Susan Ross—George Costanza's fiancée—who died after licking cheap envelope adhesive when mailing out her wedding invitations. Zabriskie's character's husband on the series, who also appeared in a recurring role, was played by her former Twin Peaks co-star, Warren Frost.

She also made a brief but memorable appearance in the episode "S'ain't Valentine's" on the CBS sitcom The King of Queens, as the emotionally disturbed and alcoholic mother of Spence Olchin (played by Patton Oswalt). While the character Veronica Olchin would reappear throughout the series, Zabriskie would not portray her again, having been replaced by Anne Meara. She also appeared twice in Aaron Spelling's series Charmed as "The Crone".

She has worked in radio, collaborating with radio dramatist/monologist Joe Frank several times. In a 1989 episode of Frank's show, "Home", she talks at length about her childhood in New Orleans, with a focus on her father.

Zabriskie appeared in the 2004 American remake of The Grudge, in which she played a senile elderly woman sensitive to the paranormal occurrences in her home.

From 2006 to 2011, she played "Lois Henrickson" on the hit HBO series Big Love. The drama series seriously explored the issue of polygamy.

In 2013, she played "Mama Dips" on The Killing.

In 2015, she played "Miss Monassian" on the hit Showtime series Ray Donovan. Then in 2016, she played "Mildred" on Outcast.

In 2017, she reprised her role as Sarah Palmer on the Showtime revival of Twin Peaks. Also in 2017, she played the role of "Mrs. Baković" on the Netflix series Santa Clarita Diet.

In 2018, she played "Enid" on the hit HBO series Ballers, opposite Dwayne Johnson. Also in 2018, she played "John's grandmother" on The Alienist.

In 2020, she starred in the music video for Grouplove's "Youth", directed by Christopher Blauvelt.

In 2022, she portrayed "Camille D'Amato" in the Hulu limited series Mike, opposite Trevante Rhodes as Mike Tyson.

== Personal life ==
In her early 20s, Zabriskie "had an intense friendship” with Kerry Wendell Thornley; this friendship was "centered around an intense shared love for and fascination with the philosophy of Ayn Rand". Although Thornley claimed that he and Zabriskie had an affair that lasted over a decade, Zabriskie denies this and states that their friendship ended due to Thornley's belief that she was involved in a conspiracy.

In May 1963, she married John Dunham MacEachron. Zabriskie has two daughters: Helen, who became an actress, and Marion Lane, a painter. In 1993, Helen died of Hodgkin's disease. Marion died in 2019, aged 56, of cancer. In 2006, she told the Los Angeles Times, "You can make your life an absolute bummer out of the inevitability of death. Or you can decide to absorb this blow and figure out a way to exist with as much energy and creativity and lack of fear as you can".

== Filmography ==
Film
Year	Title	Role	Notes
1978	They Went That-A-Way & That-A-Way	Lem's Wife	
1979	Norma Rae	Linette Odum	
1980	The Private Eyes	Nanny	
1981	Galaxy of Terror	Captain Trantor	
1982	An Officer and a Gentleman	Esther Pokrifki	
1984	Nickel Mountain	Ellie Wells	
1984	Body Rock	Chilly's Mother	
1986	The Big Easy	Mama	
1987	Rampage	Naomi Reece	
1987	Leonard Part 6	Jefferson	
1988	The Boost	Sheryl	
1989	Drugstore Cowboy	Bob's Mother	
1990	Megaville	Mrs. Jessica Palinov	
1990	Wild at Heart	Juana Durango	
1990	Child's Play 2	Grace Poole	
1991	Ambition	Mrs. Wendy Merrick	
1991	Servants of Twilight	Grace Spivey	
1991	My Own Private Idaho	Alena	
1991	Fried Green Tomatoes	Eva Bates	
1992	The Waterdance	Pat	
1992	FernGully: The Last Rainforest	Magi Lune (voice)	
1992	Twin Peaks: Fire Walk with Me	Sarah Palmer	
1992	Chain of Desire	Linda Bailey	
1993	Stone Soup	Olympia	
1993	Even Cowgirls Get the Blues	Mrs. Maria Hankshaw	
1994	The Last Laugh	Louise	Short film
1994	The Crew	Gloria Pierce	
1994	Drop Zone	Winona	
1995	Desert Winds	Jackie's Mother	
1995	The Passion of Darkly Noon	Roxy	
1996	A Family Thing	Ruby	
1996	Bastard Out of Carolina	Granny	
1997	Seed	Mother's Voice	Short film
1997	Psycho Sushi	Great Aunt	
1997	George B.	The Mother	
1997	Dead Men Can't Dance	Brig. Gen. Burke	
1997	Annie's Garden	Mrs. Felicity Barnes	
1997	Sparkler	Sherri	
1998	Armageddon	Dottie	
1998	Dante's View	Geraldine	
1999	Trash	Mrs. Wendy DeMarie	
1999	A Texas Funeral	Murtis	
1999	Me and Will	Edith	
2000	Home the Horror Story	Grace Parkinson	
2000	A Fate Foretold	Olga	Short film
2000	Puppy Love	Jeanette Foley	Short film
2000	Gone in 60 Seconds	Helen Raines	
2001	They Crawl	Mrs. Gage	
2002	R.S.V.P.	Mary Franklin	
2002	No Good Deed	Mrs. Karen Quarre	
2003	The Wind Effect	Allison	Short film
2004	The Last Letter	Mrs. Stella Allison	
2004	Chrystal	Gladys	
2004	The Grudge	Emma Williams	
2004	Sabine and the Two-Headed Baby	Sabine	Short film
2006	Inland Empire	Visitor #1	
2007	Careless	Adrienne	
2007	License to Wed	Grandma Jones	
2007	Alternate Endings	Mom	Short film
2008	The Brothel	Madam	
2009	Bob Funk	Mrs. June Funk	
2009	My Son, My Son, What Have Ye Done?	Mrs. Joan McCullum	
2013	Wrong Cops	Donna	
2013	Trancers: City of Lost Angels	The Warden	Short film (shot in 1988)
2014	Blind Malice	Nanna	
2014	Twin Peaks: The Missing Pieces	Sarah Palmer	Archived footage
2014	The Judge	Mrs. Anita Blackwell	
2014	The Makings of You	Margaret	a.k.a. Never My Love
2015	Only Child	Delores	
2015	Christmas at Rosemont	Josephine	
2019	Polaroid	Lena Sable	
2020	The Grudge: The Untold Chapter	Emma Williams	Archived footage
2021	Cryptozoo	Joan (voice)	
2024	MaXXXine	Psychic	Deleted scene
2025	Bad Painter	Mother	

Television
Year	Title	Role	Notes
1978	The Million Dollar Dixie Deliverance	Widow Cummins	TV movie
1979	Concrete Cowboys	Mrs. Kate Barnaby	Episode: "Concrete Cowboys"
1979	Freedom Road	Ruth Lait	TV movie
1980	CBS Afternoon Playhouse		Episode: "Lost in Death Valley"
1980	Blinded by the Light	Emily	TV movie
1981	East of Eden	Mrs. Catherine Ames	TV miniseries
1981	Hart to Hart	Ethyl	Episode: "A Couple of Harts"
1982	The Executioner's Song	Kathryne Baker	TV movie
1983	Tales of the Gold Monkey	Dr. Clouet	Episode: "Last Chance Louie"
1983	M.A.D.D.: Mothers Against Drunk Drivers	Silvie Alice Kohler	TV movie
1983	Cagney & Lacey	Adele	Episode: "Affirmative Action"
1984	My Mother's Secret Life	Maggie Ryan	TV movie
1984	Knots Landing	Chambermaid	Episode: "Negotiations"
1984	The Burning Bed	Flossie Hughes	TV movie
1984	Paper Dolls	Cathy	Episode: "1.8"
1985	ABC Afterschool Special	Mrs. Linton	Episode: "One Too Many"
1985	Santa Barbara	Theda Bassett	17 episodes
1985	North Beach and Rawhide	Hearings Officer	TV movie
1985	Shadow Chasers	Mary Komatar	Episode: "Shadow Chasers: Part 1"
1986	Hill Street Blues	Terry Sylvestri	Episode: "Das Blues"; Episode: "Scales of Justice"
1986	Cagney & Lacey	Eva Sikorski	Episode: "Model Citizens"
1987	Falcon Crest	Mabel Burton	Episode: "When the Bough Breaks"; Episode: "The Cradle Will Fall"
1987	Mistress	Deanie	TV movie
1988	The Bronx Zoo	Mrs. Barris	Episode: "Ties That Bind"
1988	My Father, My Son	Mouza	TV movie
1988	Shooter	Sister Marie	TV movie
1988	Empty Nest	Eva Barrett	Episode: "Pilot"
1989	The Ryan White Story	Gloria White	TV movie
1989	Unsub	Alma	Episode: "White Bone Demon"
1989	A Deadly Silence	Psychologist	TV movie
1989	Moonlighting	Rita	Episode: "In 'N Outlaws"; uncredited
1990	Tales from the Crypt	Mrs. Colbert	Episode: "The Secret"
1990	Hometown Boy Makes Good	Helen Geary	TV movie
1990–1991	Twin Peaks	Sarah Palmer	13 episodes
1991	Prison Stories: Women on the Inside	Genevieve	TV movie
1991	Blood Ties	The Woman	TV movie
1991	Intimate Stranger	Dana P. Ashley	TV movie
1992	Freshman Dorm		Episode: "Pilot"
1992	A House of Secrets and Lies	Ruby	TV movie
1992, 1996–1998	Seinfeld	Mrs. Ross	5 episodes
1993	Bonds of Love	Emma	TV movie
1993	Miracle Child	Adeleine Newberry	TV movie
1993	Black Widow Murders: The Blanche Taylor Moore Story	Ethel	TV movie
1993	Banner Times	Momma	TV movie
1993	Double Deception	Dr. Kester	TV movie
1993	Sirens	Female Store Owner	Episode: "Keeping the Peace"
1993	Angel Falls	Cuema	Episode: "Fall from Grace"
1994	Lifestories: Families in Crisis	Sandy Henry	Episode: "A Body to Die For: The Aaron Henry Story"
1995	Crazy for a Kiss	Pearl Kinross	TV movie
1995	Children of the Dust	Rose	TV movie
1995	Under Suspicion	Lily Cassins	Episode: "Hostage Standoff"; Episode: "Wrongful Shooting"
1995	Empty Nest	Scarlett	Episode: "Life Goes On: Part 1"; Episode: "Life Goes On: Part 2"
1995	Fallen Angels	Virna	Episode: "The Black Bargain"
1995	NYPD Blue	Wanda Padzik	Episode: "The Bookie and the Kooky Cookie"
1996	A Promise to Carolyn	Francie Harper	TV movie
1996	Second Noah	Mrs. Cheval	Episode: "Stormy Weather"
1996	Murder at My Door	Grandma	TV movie
1996	The Burning Zone	Retired CIA Agent	Episode: "Touch of the Dead"
1997	NYPD Blue	Millie Banks	Episode: "A Remington Original"
1997	High Incident	Mattie	Episode: "Remote Control"
1997	Over the Top	Dolly	Episode: "The Southern Story"
1997	The Devil's Child	Rose DeMarco	TV movie
1998	Dharma & Greg	Naomi	Episode: "It Takes a Village"
1998	Houdini	Mrs. Weiss	TV movie
1998	Profiler	Mrs. Boudreaux	Episode: "The Sum of Her Parts"
1999	The King of Queens	Veronica	Episode: "S'ain't Valentine's"
2000	Jesse	Grandma Rose	Episode: "Jesse Gives Birth"
2000	The West Wing	Isobel	Episode: "In the Shadow of Two Gunmen: Part II"
2002	The Guardian	Judith	Episode: "The Dead"
2002	The Glow	Sylvia Goodstein	TV movie
2002–2003	John Doe	Yellow Teeth	6 episodes
2003	Charmed	The Crone	Episode: "Baby's First Demon"; Episode: "Sense and Sense Ability"
2005	Medium	Connie Buckley	Episode: "The Other Side of the Tracks"
2006–2011	Big Love	Lois Henrickson	52 episodes
2013	The Killing	Mama Dips	3 episodes
2015	Ray Donovan	Miss Monassian	6 episodes
2016	Outcast	Mildred	4 episodes
2017	Santa Clarita Diet	Mrs. Baković	2 episodes
2017	Twin Peaks: The Return	Sarah Palmer	6 episodes
2018	The Alienist	John's Grandmother	4 episodes
2018	Ballers	Enid	2 episodes
2019	Hot Streets	Senkah (voice)	Episode: "Super Agent 2"
2022	Mike	Camille D'Amato	3 episodes

Video games
Year	Title	Role	Notes
1993	Voyeur	Margaret Hawke	Actress (FMV)
2022	The Quarry	Eliza Vorez	Voice, motion capture and likeness
