= The Barbra Streisand Album =

Studio album by Barbra Streisand
- Released: February 25, 1963
- Recorded: January 23–25, 1963
- Studio: Columbia 7th Ave, New York City
- Genre: Classic pop
- Length: 32:52
- Label: Columbia
- Producer: Mike Berniker

Barbra Streisand chronology
| The Barbra Streisand Album (1963) | The Second Barbra Streisand Album (1963) |

Singles from The Barbra Streisand Album
- 1. "Happy Days Are Here Again" Released: November 1962

The Barbra Streisand Album is the debut album by American singer Barbra Streisand, released February 25, 1963, on Columbia Records, catalogue CL 2007 in mono and CS 8807 in stereo. It peaked at number 8 on the Billboard Top LPs, and has been certified a gold album by the RIAA. By 1966, the album had sold over one million copies worldwide.

The album was nominated for five Grammys at the 1963 Grammy Awards and won Album of the Year, Best Female Vocal Performance and Best Album Cover. The album was inducted into the Grammy Hall of Fame Award in 2006.

== Background ==
Columbia label president Goddard Lieberson initially resisted signing Streisand to a contract, finding her style too close to the cabaret singers he disliked and too far from the understated approach of Jo Stafford or Rosemary Clooney, who recorded for the label in the 1950s. Lieberson relented and agreed to sign her. Nearly three decades later Streisand said:

The most important thing about that first contract – actually, the thing we held out for – was a unique clause giving me the right to choose my own material. It was the only thing I really cared about. I still received lots of pressure from the label to include some pop hits on my first album, but I held out for the songs that really meant something to me.

Streisand exercised her creative control and chose the straightforward album title, rejecting Columbia's choice of Sweet and Saucy Streisand. She once mentioned, "I said 'What is the truth of it? It's the Barbra Streisand album.' If you saw me on TV, you could just go [to the record shop] and ask for the Barbra Streisand album." Despite Lieberson's initial reservations, Streisand went on to become one of Columbia's most enduring artists.

The album was originally conceived as a live recording, since Streisand had made a name for herself performing at New York City nightclubs such as the Bon Soir and the Blue Angel. Her producer Mike Berniker brought a crew to the Bon Soir to record Streisand accompanied by the nightclub's house musicians and her pianist, Peter Daniels. The live recordings were shelved in favor of studio recordings, although the photograph for the album cover was taken during the Bon Soir session. Some material from the Bon Soir sets would later appear on Streisand's Just for the Record... retrospective box set in 1991; and, coinciding with the sixtieth anniversary of those sessions, the full recordings were released as Live at the Bon Soir in 2022.

== Recording ==
Recording studio sessions took place January 23–25, 1963, at Columbia's Studio A in New York City with a budget of $18,000. Material was mostly chosen from Broadway standards, many of which were fairly obscure. "I'll Tell the Man in the Street" was originally performed by Dennis King in the 1938 production of I Married An Angel, and "Who's Afraid of the Big Bad Wolf?" was taken from the 1933 Disney cartoon Three Little Pigs. Streisand's rendition of the Disney song began with the quoting of the first 11 notes from the "Cat Theme" from Russian composer Serge Prokofiev's Peter and the Wolf, which did result in a lawsuit against Columbia Records, from Prokofiev's estates, which was settled out of court, with Prokofiev's widow receiving half of the proceeds for the unapproved quote. The Disney song ended on a Spike Jones style of rhythm and slide whistles, heard at the end of the track, before the song's fade. Not one of Cole Porter's well-known numbers, "Come to the Supermarket (in Old Peking)" appeared in a 1958 television special with music by Porter, while "A Sleepin' Bee" came from the 1954 musical House of Flowers.

"Soon It's Gonna Rain" and "Much More" were both introduced in the 1960 off-Broadway musical The Fantasticks, and the 1930 film Chasing Rainbows provided "Happy Days Are Here Again". "Cry Me A River" was a signature song of singer Julie London, while "A Taste of Honey" was coincidentally recorded less than three weeks later by the Beatles for their 1963 debut album, Please Please Me.

"Happy Days Are Here Again" was released as Columbia single 42631 with "When the Sun Comes Out" on the b-side, but it did not chart. Notwithstanding, at the 1964 Grammy Awards, The Barbra Streisand Album won awards in the categories of Album of the Year, Best Female Vocal Performance, and Best Album Cover - Other Than Classical, the latter presented to art director John Berg.

The only song recorded but not included on this album was "Bewitched, Bothered and Bewildered" which Streisand and Mike Berniker recorded on two separate dates (including a later session on January 29). The song was included instead on Streisand's The Third Album using a Peter Daniels arrangement.

Streisand chose Century Expanded Italic, the typeface for the album sleeve of her debut album, which would also be used on 19 other Streisand album covers.

The album made its digital debut on CD in 1987 and was re-released in a remastered CD edition on October 19, 1993.

== Critical reception ==
Professional ratings
Review scores
| Source | Rating |
|---|---|
| AllMusic | 5/5 stars |

In a "POP SPOTLIGHT" review for Billboard, the album was praised as "most persuasive" and was predicted to draw "an enormous amount of play from the top good music stations." The review noted that the set was "loaded with goodies sung in most dramatic fashion," highlighting Streisand's "slow ballad version of 'Happy Days Are Here Again'" as a particular draw, along with "many of the other tracks."

Cashbox declared that "once in a great while a new singer comes along who deserves special attention. Such an artist is Barbra Streisand." The review praised her "highly-distinctive, throaty, wide-range, legit-styled voice and amazingly intricate sense of phrasing," noting that the "songstress dishes up some stunning Peter Matz-arranged versions of 'Cry Me A River,' 'Soon, It’s Gonna Rain' and 'Keepin' Out Of Mischief Now.'" The magazine concluded by highlighting the album's "heavy airplay potential."

AllMusic gave the album a retrospective five (out of five) stars, and called it "an essential recording in the field of pop vocals because it redefines that genre in contemporary terms," and "the first thing that strikes you listening to it, is that great voice. And it isn't just the sheer quality of the voice, its purity and its strength throughout its register, it's also the mastery of vocal effects that produce dramatic readings of the lyrics -- each song is like a one-act musical."

== Track listing ==
Side one
| No. | Title | Writer(s) | Length |
|---|---|---|---|
| 1. | "Cry Me a River" | Arthur Hamilton | 3:37 |
| 2. | "My Honey's Lovin' Arms" | Joseph Meyer; Harry Ruby | 2:14 |
| 3. | "I'll Tell the Man in the Street" | Lorenz Hart; Richard Rodgers | 3:09 |
| 4. | "A Taste of Honey" | Ric Marlow; Bobby Scott | 2:51 |
| 5. | "Who's Afraid of the Big Bad Wolf?" | Frank Churchill; Ann Ronell | 2:35 |
| 6. | "Soon It's Gonna Rain" | Tom Jones; Harvey Schmidt | 3:44 |

Side two
| No. | Title | Writer(s) | Length |
|---|---|---|---|
| 1. | "Happy Days Are Here Again" | Milton Ager; Jack Yellen | 3:04 |
| 2. | "Keepin' Out of Mischief Now" | Andy Razaf; Thomas Waller | 2:11 |
| 3. | "Much More" | Tom Jones; Harvey Schmidt | 3:02 |
| 4. | "Come to the Supermarket in Old Peking" | Cole Porter | 1:56 |
| 5. | "A Sleepin' Bee" | Harold Arlen; Truman Capote | 4:21 |

== Personnel ==
- Barbra Streisand – vocals
- Mike Berniker – producer
- Peter Matz – arrangements
- Fred Plaut and Frank Laico – recording engineers
- John Berg – design
- Henry Parker – photography
- Harold Arlen – liner notes
- Mel Lewis – drums

== Charts ==
=== Weekly charts ===
| Chart (1963) | Peak position |
|---|---|
| Australian Albums (Kent Music Report) | 6 |
| US Billboard 200 | 8 |

=== Year-end charts ===
| Chart (1963) | Peak position |
|---|---|
| US Billboard Top LPs | 15 |
| US Top 100 Albums (Cash Box) | 10 |

| Chart (1964) | Peak position |
|---|---|
| US Billboard Top LPs | 4 |
| US Top 100 Albums (Cash Box) | 7 |

== Certifications and sales ==
| Region | Certification | Certified units/sales |
|---|---|---|
| United States (RIAA) | Gold | 500,000^{^} |
Summaries
| Worldwide as of 1966 | — | 1,000,000 |
^{^} Shipments figures based on certification alone.
