= I'll Tell the Man in the Street =

Song
- Published: 1938
- Songwriter(s): Lorenz Hart
- Composer(s): Richard Rodgers

"I'll Tell the Man in the Street" is a song first introduced by Dennis King in the 1938 stage musical I Married an Angel.

The song was written by Richard Rodgers and Lorenz Hart.

== Other Recordings ==
=== Nelson Eddy ===
Nelson Eddy performed the song with additional lyrics by Bob Wright and Chet Forrest in the film version of I Married An Angel.

=== Barbra Streisand ===
Barbra Streisand recorded the song for her debut solo album The Barbra Streisand Album in 1963.

=== Kristin Chenoweth ===
Kristin Chenoweth recorded the song for her 2001 solo album Let Yourself Go.
