= Happy Days Are Here Again =

Song composed by Milton Ager, words by Jack Yellen

Sheet music, 1929

"Happy Days Are Here Again" is a 1929 song with music by Milton Ager and lyrics by Jack Yellen. It was originally published by Ager, Yellen, and Bornstein. The song is a standard that has been interpreted by various artists. It appeared in the 1930 film Chasing Rainbows and was the campaign song for Franklin D. Roosevelt's 1932 presidential campaign. It is the unofficial anthem of Roosevelt's Democratic Party. Its copyright was renewed in 1956, so it entered the American public domain on January 1, 2025. The song is number 47 on the Recording Industry Association of America's list of "Songs of the Century". In 1986 it received an ASCAP Award for 'Most Performed Feature Film Standards on TV'.

== In Chasing Rainbows ==
The song was recorded by Leo Reisman and His Orchestra, with vocals by Lou Levin in November 1929 and was featured in the 1930 film Chasing Rainbows. The song concluded the picture, in what film historian Edwin Bradley described as a "pull-out-all-the-stops Technicolor finale, against a Great War Armistice show-within-a-show backdrop".

== In popular culture ==
Closely associated with Franklin D. Roosevelt's successful presidential campaign in 1932, the song gained prominence after a spontaneous decision by Roosevelt's advisers to play it at the 1932 Democratic National Convention: after a dirge-like version of Roosevelt's favorite song Anchors Aweigh had been repeated over and over, without enthusiasm, a participant reportedly shouted: "For God's sake, have them play something else", which caused the band to play the new song, drawing cheers and applause, and subsequently becoming the Democratic Party's "unofficial theme song for years to come." The song is also associated with the Repeal of Prohibition, which occurred shortly after Roosevelt's election where there were signs saying "Happy days are beer again" and so on.

Matthew Greenwald described the song as "[a] true saloon standard, [and] a Tin Pan Alley standard, and had been sung by virtually every interpreter since the 1940s. In a way, it's the pop version of Auld Lang Syne".

The song has been recorded hundreds of times, and appeared in various TV ads, TV shows and over 80 films, it is used in many to symbolize the 1930s, in others to sign a start of a new era or a return to glory.

In 1930, the song's melody was used with (unrelated) lyrics in German by the librettist Charles Amberg. This song, titled "Wochenend und Sonnenschein" (Weekend and Sunshine), was first recorded by the Comedian Harmonists.

== Barbra Streisand recordings ==
"Happy Days Are Here Again"

Single by Barbra Streisand

from the album The Barbra Streisand Album
- B-side: "When the Sun Comes Out"
- Released: November 1962
- Recorded: October 1962
- Studio: Columbia 7th Ave (New York)
- Genre: Pop
- Label: Columbia
- Composer: Milton Ager
- Lyricist: Jack Yellen

Barbra Streisand singles chronology
"Miss Marmelstein" (1962)	"Happy Days Are Here Again" (1962)	"My Coloring Book" (1962)

Barbra Streisand first recorded the song over three decades after its initial release. While traditionally sung at a brisk pace, Streisand's rendition became notable for its slow and expressive performance.

On a May 1962 episode of The Garry Moore Show, Streisand sang the song during the That Wonderful Year skit representing 1929. She performed it ironically as a millionaire who has just lost all of her money and enters a bar, giving the bartender her expensive jewelry in exchange for drinks.

Streisand first recorded the song in October 1962 at Columbia's NYC studio, some months before her first album sessions. This version, arranged and conducted by George Williams, became Streisand's first commercial single in November 1962, with When the Sun Comes Out as a B-side. Only 500 copies of this single were pressed for the New York market, and no copies were sent to radio stations. This 1962 version was re-released as a single in March 1965 as part of the Hall of Fame series with the 1962 recording of My Coloring Book.

Streisand re-recorded the song in January 1963 for her debut solo The Barbra Streisand Album, including the introductory lyrics, which are rarely sung in most releases.

Streisand performed the song opposite Judy Garland in a medley with "Get Happy" for an October 1963 broadcast of The Judy Garland Show. (The live audio of the medley would later be included on Streisand's 1991 box set Just for the Record... and again on her 2002 Duets compilation album.)

In June 1967, Streisand performed the song for over 135,000 people at Central Park, captured on the live concert album A Happening in Central Park. (The live track later appeared on the compilations Barbra Streisand's Greatest Hits and The Essential Barbra Streisand.)

The song has become a signature part of Streisand's concert repertoire, performing it live on numerous occasions; unique renditions appear on Live Concert at the Forum (1972), One Voice (1987), The Concert (1994), Timeless: Live in Concert (2000), Live in Concert 2006 (2007), Back to Brooklyn (2013), and The Music...The Mem'ries...The Magic! (2017).

Streisand released a new studio recording of Happy Days on her 2018 album Walls.
