= When the Sun Comes Out =

1962 song performed by Barbra Streisand

"Happy Days Are Here Again / When the Sun Comes Out"

Single by Barbra Streisand

from the album The Second Barbra Streisand Album
- Released: November 1962
- Recorded: 1962
- Studio: Columbia 7th Ave (New York City)
- Genre: Pop
- Label: Columbia
- Songwriters: Harold Arlen (music) and Ted Koehler (lyrics)

Barbra Streisand singles chronology
""Miss Marmelstein""	"Happy Days Are Here Again / When the Sun Comes Out"	""My Coloring Book" / "Lover, Come Back To Me""

"When the Sun Comes Out" is a song composed by Harold Arlen, with lyrics written by Ted Koehler, in 1941. It was introduced in 1941 by Helen O'Connell with the Jimmy Dorsey Orchestra (Decca 3657A).

== Barbra Streisand recording ==
Streisand recorded the song on October 26, 1962, at Columbia's Studio C, some months before her first album sessions. This version, arranged and conducted by George Williams, became her first commercial single in November, 1962, with "Happy Days Are Here Again" on the A-side. Only 500 copies of this single were pressed for the New York market, and no copies were sent to radio stations.

Streisand re-recorded the song on June 3, 1963, for The Second Barbra Streisand Album.

== Other notable recordings ==
- Ethel Azama – Cool Heat (1960)
- Tony Bennett – Sings a String of Harold Arlen (1960)
- Sylvia Brooks – Dangerous Liaisons (2009)
- Royce Campbell – "All Ballads & A Bossa" (2012)
- June Christy – Gone for the Day (1957)
- Billy Eckstine – Billy's Best! (1958)
- Ella Fitzgerald – Ella Fitzgerald Sings the Harold Arlen Songbook (1961)
- Judy Garland – Garland at the Grove (1959; 2008 expanded reissue)
- Benny Goodman & His Orchestra (1941 – vocal by Helen Forrest. Arranged by Eddie Sauter). (Columbia 36209).
- Eydie Gorme – Eydie Swings the Blues (1957).
- Harry James – Columbia 39419 (1951)
- Peggy Lee – Sugar 'n' Spice (1962)
- Barbara McNair – The Livin' End (1965)
- Helen Merrill – The Nearness of You (1958)
- Nicki Parrott – Summertime (2012)
- Art Pepper – Winter Moon (1980)
- Kenny Rankin – A Song for You (2002)
- Ann Richards – The Many Moods of Ann Richards/Two Much (2004 compilation).
- Mel Torme – Mel Torme and the Marty Paich Dek-Tette (1956)
- Stanley Turrentine – The Spoiler (1966)
- Joseph Leo Bwarie - "Nothin' But Love" (2011)
- Kim Weston - "For The First Time" (1966)
