= I Can Get It for You Wholesale (album) =

I Can Get It for You Wholesale: Original Broadway Cast Recording

Cast recording by various artists
- Released: April 1962
- Genre: Showtunes
- Label: Columbia
- Producer: Goddard Lieberson

Singles from I Can Get It for You Wholesale: Original Broadway Cast Recording
- 1. "Miss Marmelstein / Who Knows?" Released: April 1962

I Can Get It for You Wholesale is the original Broadway cast album for the musical of the same name, with music and lyrics by Harold Rome. The album is notable for the Barbra Streisand solo "Miss Marmelstein".

== Background ==
The album marks Streisand's first professional recording appearance. She is featured on the songs "I'm Not a Well Man", "Ballard of the Garment Trade", "Miss Marmelstein", and "What Are They Doing to Us Now?". Album producer Goddard Lieberson signed Streisand to a contract, and her first solo album The Barbra Streisand Album was released two months after Wholesale closed on Broadway.

== Track listing ==
All songs written by Harold Rome.

1. "Overture" – 1:27
2. "I'm Not a Well Man" (Barbra Streisand and Jack Kruschen) – 2:21
3. "The Way Things Are" (Elliott Gould) – 1:41
4. "When Gemini Meets Capricorn" (Marilyn Cooper and Gould) – 2:48
5. "Momma, Momma, Momma" (Gould and Lillian Roth) – 2:57
6. "The Sound of Money" (Gould and Sheree North) – 4:15
7. "Too Soon" (Roth) – 3:05
8. "The Family Way" (Gould, Roth, Cooper, Ken LeRoy, and Bambi Linn) – 3:08
9. "Who Knows?" (Cooper) – 3:41
10. "Ballad of the Garment Trade" (Streisand, Gould, Cooper, LeRoy, Linn) – 3:25
11. "Have I Told You Lately?" (LeRoy and Linn) – 3:10
12. "A Gift Today" (Gould, Roth, Cooper, LeRoy, and Linn) – 3:55
13. "Miss Marmelstein" (Streisand) – 3:22
14. "A Funny Thing Happened" (Gould and Cooper) – 2:38
15. "What's in It for Me?" (Harold Lang) – 1:57
16. "Eat a Little Something" (Gould and Roth) – 2:10
17. "What Are They Doing to Us Now?" (Streisand) – 7:11

== Unrecorded tracks ==
The following songs from the musical show were not included in the cast recording:

- "Overture" (This unrecorded overture is a medley typical of the standard Broadway musical. The recorded track titled "Overture" is actually a brief musical accompaniment to a piece of dance and movement that opens the first scene.)
- "The Sound of Money (Reprise)" (Harold Rome)
- "Epilogue" (Harold Rome)

== Singles ==
The songs "Miss Marmelstein" (Streisand) and "Who Knows?" (Cooper) were released to radio stations as a promotional single in April 1962.

#	Title	Date
1.	"Miss Marmelstein" / "Who Knows?"	April 1962

== Chart performance ==
The album peaked at #125 on the Billboard Pop Albums Chart.

Chart (1962)	Peak Position
US Billboard Pop Albums Chart	125

== Personnel ==
- Produced by Goddard Lieberson
- Music and lyrics by Harold Rome
- Musical direction and vocal arrangements by Lehman Engel
- Orchestrations by Sid Ramin
- Original recording engineers: Fred Plaut and Ed Michalski
