= I Can Get It for You Wholesale (disambiguation) =

I Can Get It for You Wholesale is a 1962 musical with music and lyrics by Harold Rome.

I Can Get It for You Wholesale may also refer to:

- I Can Get It for You Wholesale, a 1937 novel by Jerome Weidman, and the basis for the musical
- I Can Get It for You Wholesale (film), a 1951 film adaptation of the novel
- I Can Get It for You Wholesale (album), original Broadway cast recording of the 1962 musical

== See also ==
- "We Can Remember It for You Wholesale", a 1966 short story by Philip K. Dick
