= Miss Marmelstein =

1962 song performed by Barbra Streisand

Single by Barbra Streisand

from the album I Can Get It For You Wholesale
- B-side: "Who Knows?" (performed by Marilyn Cooper)
- Released: April 1962
- Recorded: 1962
- Studio: Columbia 30th Street Studio (New York, NY)
- Genre: Showtunes
- Length: 3:22
- Label: Columbia
- Songwriter: Harold Rome
- Producer: Goddard Lieberson

Barbra Streisand singles chronology
"Miss Marmelstein" (1962)	"Happy Days Are Here Again" (1962)

"Miss Marmelstein" is a song composed by Harold Rome, first introduced by Barbra Streisand in the Broadway musical I Can Get It for You Wholesale. The young secretary Miss Marmelstein is a supporting role in the show; in the song she laments everyone addressing her so formally. The song became the most memorable part of the musical, with Streisand routinely stopping the show.

The song was released as a promotional only single to radio in April 1962 with "Who Knows?" (performed by Marilyn Cooper) on the b-side. This marked Streisand's first appearance on a Columbia Records single.

Streisand's first name was misspelled on the vinyl as "Barbara".

== Live performances ==
In 2000, Barbra performed the song during her Timeless concert tour, later included on the Timeless: Live in Concert album and DVD releases.
