= Mersereau =

Mersereau is a surname. Notable people with the surname include:

- Bob Mersereau, Canadian arts journalist
- Claire Mersereau (1894–1982), American actress, sister of Violet
- Jacques Mersereau, set decorator
- Marcelle Mersereau (born 1942), Canadian politician
- Paul Mersereau (painter) (1873–?), French painter
- Scott Mersereau (born 1965), American football player
- Violet Mersereau (1892–1975), American actress

== See also ==
- Mersereau Ring
