= The Counterplan Song =

1932 Soviet song

The Counterplan Song (The Morning Greets Us With Coolness) (Russian: "Песня о встречном (Нас утро встречает прохладой") is a Soviet song created for the 1932 propaganda drama film Counterplan, which rose to great popularity and became a popular melody in the Soviet Union. The song was composed by Dmitri Shostakovich and the lyrics written by Boris Kornilov, who would be killed as part of the Great Terror in 1938.

Beyond the movie, the song was adapted for various purposes and in different languages.

== History ==
The song stems from and is featured prominently in Counterplan, a propaganda drama film about workers at a metal plan in Leningrad during the first five-year plan originally released on 7 November 1932.

The music for the film was composed by Dmitri Shostakovich. The lyrics came from Boris Kornilov.

On 19 March 1937, less than five years after the film's release, Kornilov was arrested as part of the Great Purge and executed on 20 February 1938. Despite this, the song would be used as part of morning radio broadcast for years after his death. Kornilov was officially rehabilitated on 5 January 1957.

== Other usage ==
The song would later become popular abroad. The music or the song was used in the following:

- "Au-devant de la vie", a song of the French socialist movement, with new lyrics by Jeanne Perret.
- "United Nations on the March", with new lyrics by Harold Rome. That song was also used in the 1943 American film Thousands Cheer.
- "Dmitri Shostakovich - Into the Cold Dawn", a 2008 documentary on Shostakovich by German filmmaker Armin Mueller-Stahl, referenced the song in the title.
- Two Prosecutors, a 2025 historical drama film about the Great Purge by Ukrainian filmmaker Sergei Loznitsa used the song both in the third act and in the end credits.

== Text ==
Russian (Cyrillic)	Russian (Transliterated)	English Translation
Нас утро встречает прохладой, Нас ветром встречает река. Кудрявая, что ж ты не рада Весёлому пенью гудка? Не спи, вставай, кудрявая! В цехах звеня, Страна встаёт со славою На встречу дня.	Nas utro vstrechayet prokhladoy, Nas vetrom vstrechayet reka. Kudryavaya, chto zh ty ne rada Vesolomu pen'yu gudka? Ne spi, vstavay, kudryavaya! V tsekhakh zvenya, Strana vstayot so slavoyu Na vstrechu dnya.	The morning greets us with coolness, The river greets us with wind. Curly-haired, why aren't you glad To the cheerful sound of the whistle? Don't sleep, wake up, curly-haired! Ringing in the workshops, The country rises with glory To greet the day.
И радость поёт нескончая, И песня навстречу идёт, И люди смеются, встречая, И встречное солнце встаёт. Горячее и бравое, Бодрит меня. Страна встаёт со славою, На встречу дня!	I radost' poyot neskonchaya, I pesnya navstrechu idot, I lyudi smeyutsya, vstrechaya, I vstrechnoye solntse vstayot. Goryacheye i bravoye, Bodrit menya. Strana vstayot so slavoyu, Na vstrechu dnya!	And joy sings endlessly, And a song comes to meet us, And people laugh, greeting us, And the oncoming sun rises. Hot and brave, It invigorates me. The country rises with glory, To greet the day!
И с ней до победного края Ты, молодость наша, пройдёшь, Покуда не выйдет вторая На встречу тебе молодёжь. И в жизнь вбежит оравою, Отцов сменя. Страна встаёт со славою На встречу дня!	I s ney do pobednogo kraya Ty, molodost' nasha, proydosh', Pokuda ne vyydet vtoraya Na vstrechu tebe molodozh'. I v zhizn' vbezhit oravoyu, Ottsov smenya. Strana vstayot so slavoyu Na vstrechu dnya!	And with her to the edge of victory. You, our youth, will walk, Until a second Youth will come to meet you. And a horde will rush into life, Replacing their fathers. The country rises with glory To greet the day!
Такою прекрасною речью О правде своей заяви, Мы жизни выходим навстречу, Навстречу труду и любви. Любить грешно ль, кудрявая, Когда, звеня, Страна встаёт со славою На встречу дня!	Takoyu prekrasnoyu rech'yu O pravde svoyey zayavi, My zhizni vykhodim navstrechu, Navstrechu trudu i lyubvi. Lyubit' greshno l', kudryavaya, Kogda, zvenya, Strana vstayot so slavoyu Na vstrechu dnya!	With such a beautiful speech Proclaim your truth, We go forth to meet life, To meet labor and love. Is it a sin to love, my curly one, When, ringing, The country rises with glory To meet the day!
