= Paul Mersereau =

Paul Mersereau may refer to:

- Paul Mersereau (painter)
- Paul Mersereau (politician)
