= Counterplan (film) =

1932 film

- Directed by: Sergei Yutkevich; Fridrikh Ermler
- Written by: Lev Arnshtam; Fridrikh Ermler; Leonid Lyubashevsky; Sergei Yutkevich
- Starring: Vladimir Gardin
- Cinematography: Aleksandr Gintsburg; Iosif Martov; Vladimir Rapoport
- Music by: Dmitri Shostakovich
- Production company: Lenfilm
- Release date: 7 November 1932
- Running time: 118 minutes
- Country: Soviet Union
- Language: Russian

Counterplan (Russian: Встречный, romanized: Vstrechnyy) is a 1932 Soviet drama film directed by Sergei Yutkevich and Fridrikh Ermler.

The plot involves an effort to catch "wreckers" at work in a Soviet factory.

== Plot ==
During the first Five-Year Plan, workers at the Leningrad Metal Plant take on the responsibility of constructing and launching the production of the first Soviet hydraulic turbines of increased power, essential for building hydroelectric stations as part of the GOELRO plan. The task of machining one of the turbines is assigned to Semyon Babchenko, an experienced but non-party worker. The workers celebrate the completion of Babchenko's shift, but a defect is found in the turbine, caused by his problematic alcohol habit. Babchenko decides to quit drinking before work, but his shift produces a new part, which turns out to be defective again. This time, the defect is caused by a warped lathe bed.

The secretary of the party committee calls an emergency meeting, and an intoxicated Babchenko bursts in, carrying a black "flag of shame" he had ripped from his lathe. After the scandal, the secretary of the party committee visits Babchenko at his apartment and urges him to return to work and take responsibility. He encourages the use of the "factory guard"—the old masters. Babchenko heeds the advice and organizes the old masters to continue the work. They find an abandoned lathe and restore it, but another setback occurs when worker Chutochkin discovers a design flaw in the blueprint, previously noticed by engineer Skvortsov, who had concealed it due to being a secret opponent of Soviet power. The workers apply an innovative solution to the problem, successfully creating the turbine, which passes the control tests. This joyful achievement is celebrated at Babchenko's apartment, where the workers toast the successful completion of the plan, and Babchenko raises a glass: "To the new Communist, Semyon Ivanovich Babchenko."

== Music ==
The film's title song, "The Counterplan Song", composed by Dmitri Shostakovich with lyrics by the poet Boris Kornilov, became world famous. Shostakovich's composition, with new lyrics by Jeanne Perret, would be used shortly after in the notable song of the French socialist movement, "Au-devant de la vie".

Shostakovich was to use the piece again in his Poem of the Motherland (1947), another film entitled Mitchurin (1948) and his 1958 operetta Moscow, Cheremushki!. In 1942 the song was given English words by Harold Rome under the title "United Nations on the March" and in this guise it was featured as the choral finale to MGM's patriotic war-time musical Thousands Cheer (1943). That same year, Leopold Stokowski made an orchestral arrangement of the song and this was given the title "United Nations March".

== Cast ==
- Vladimir Gardin - Babchenko
- Mariya Blyumental - Tamarina
- Tatyana Guretskaya - Katya
- Andrei Abrikosov - Pavel
- Boris Tenin - Vasya
- Boris Poslavsky - Skvortsov
- M. Pototskaya - Skvortsov's mother
- Aleksei Alekseyev - Plant's director
- Nikolai Kozlovsky - Lazarev
- Vladimir Sladkopevtsev - Morgun
- Yakov Gudkin - Chutochkin
- Nikolai Michurin - worker
- Pyotr Alejnikov - worker
- Stepan Krylov - worker
- Nikolai Cherkasov
- Zoya Fyodorova
