= Timeless: Live in Concert =

Live album by Barbra Streisand
- Released: September 19, 2000
- Recorded: December 31, 1999 – January 1, 2000
- Genres: Pop, show tunes
- Length: 123:17
- Label: Columbia
- Producers: Barbra Streisand, Jay Landers

Barbra Streisand chronology
| A Love Like Ours (1999) | Timeless: Live in Concert (2000) | Christmas Memories (2001) |

Professional ratings
Review scores
| Source | Rating |
|---|---|
| Allmusic | link |

Timeless: Live in Concert is a live album released by Barbra Streisand on September 19, 2000 (see 2000 in music). It was her fifth live album and was released on Columbia Records (catalog no. CK 63778). The album was issued a week before what were said to be her final concerts in September 2000 and would reach platinum certification.

== Content ==
Timeless is a double album that includes moments from Streisand's New Year's Eve 1999 and New Year's Day 2000 shows at the MGM Grand Garden Arena on the Las Vegas Strip, which were part of her Timeless concert tour. The release is set up like a play in two acts and even has a two-minute entr'acte featuring conductor, Marvin Hamlisch, who is also present throughout the performance. It opens with a dramatization of her first, amateur recording session, in which Lauren Frost plays a part described in the credits as "Young Girl" though Streisand later refers to her as "my little-girl self" and "mini me". The rest of Act One traces Streisand's career from her club days to Broadway and her movie performances.

Act two opens with several of Barbra's duets. This section is followed by dialogue and songs both reminiscent and optimistic thanks to the backdrop of the New Year's holiday. As the midnight hour approaches, Barbra is joined on stage by husband, James Brolin. Much of the dialogue takes place as small scenes or skits about time and timelessness. The CD version includes songs that span Streisand's career up to that time, such as "Cry Me a River" and "Happy Days Are Here Again", from her debut album, and "At the Same Time" from her 1997 album Higher Ground.

The 24-page CD insert includes photographs, portraits and concert shots as well as an account of the dress rehearsal written by producer, Jay Landers. The 2-CD set includes over two hours of performance divided into 37 tracks. The album debuted at No. 21 on the Billboard 200 and remained on the chart for fifteen consecutive weeks. On the Top Internet Albums chart, Timeless peaked at No. 2. On October 20, 2000, the album received gold and platinum certification from the RIAA. According to Nielsen Soundscan, the albums sold over 477,000 copies as of 2007.

Barnes & Noble offered a bonus in their sale of the CD package: a CD single "Come Rain Or Come Shine" recorded live during one of Barbra's Australian performances.

== Track listing ==
=== Disc one – Act one ===
1. "Opening/You'll Never Know" (with Lauren Frost, Alec Ledd, and Randee Heller) (Harry Warren, Mack Gordon) – 2:31
2. "Something's Coming" (with Lauren Frost) (Leonard Bernstein, Stephen Sondheim) – 3:41
3. "The Way We Were" (Marvin Hamlisch, Alan Bergman, Marilyn Bergman) – 4:18
4. "Shirley MacLaine Y1K" (dialogue) – 4:41
5. "Cry Me a River" (Arthur Hamilton) – 3:14
6. "Lover, Come Back To Me" (Oscar Hammerstein II, Sigmund Romberg) – 2:54
7. "A Sleepin' Bee" (Harold Arlen, Truman Capote) – 3:43
8. "Miss Marmelstein" (Harold Rome) – 2:27
9. "I'm the Greatest Star/Second Hand Rose/Don't Rain on My Parade" (Jule Styne, Bob Merrill / Grant Clarke, J.F. Hanly / Styne, Merrill) – 5:21
10. "Something Wonderful/Being Alive" (Rodgers and Hammerstein / Sondheim) – 4:35
11. "As Time Goes By"/"Speak Low" (Herman Hupfeld / Kurt Weill, Ogden Nash) – 2:10
12. "Alfie" (Burt Bacharach, Hal David) – 4:02
13. "Evergreen" (Streisand, Paul Williams) – 4:04
14. "Dialogue" (Father, Part #1) – 1:18
15. "Papa, Can You Hear Me?/You'll Never Know" (with Lauren Frost) (Michel Legrand, A. Bergman, M. Bergman / Warren, Gordon) – 3:20
16. "A Piece of Sky" (with Lauren Frost) (Legrand, A. Bergman, M. Bergman) – 3:13

=== Disc two – Act two ===
1. "Entr'acte" (Hamlisch) – 2:21
2. "Putting It Together" (Sondheim) – 3:35
3. "On A Clear Day (You Can See Forever)" (Alan Jay Lerner, Burton Lane) – 2:27
4. "Send in the Clowns" (Sondheim) – 3:06
5. "Happy Days Are Here Again/Get Happy" (with Judy Garland)/"Guilty" (with Barry Gibb)/"I Finally Found Someone" (with Bryan Adams)/"Tell Him" (with Celine Dion)/"You Don't Bring Me Flowers" (with Neil Diamond)" (Milton Ager, Jack Yellen / Arlen, Ted Koehler / B. Gibb, Maurice Gibb, Robin Gibb / Adams, Hamlisch, Robert Lange / Linda Thompson, Walter Afanasieff, David Foster / Diamond, A. Bergman, M. Bergman) – 2:07
6. "Sing" (with Jason Gould)/"I've Got a Crush on You" (with Frank Sinatra) (Joe Raposo / George Gershwin, Ira Gershwin) – 3:22
7. "Technology" (Dialogue) – 2:03
8. "The Clicker Blues" (Hamlisch, A. Bergman, M. Bergman) – 0:58
9. "Simple Pleasures" (Hamlisch, A. Bergman, M. Bergman) – 3:02
10. "The Main Event/Fight" (Paul Jabara, Bruce Roberts / Jabara, Bob Esty) – 4:07
11. "Dialogue" (Father, Part #2) – 1:35
12. "I've Dreamed of You" (Rolf Løvland, Ann Hampton Callaway) – 3:24
13. "At the Same Time" (Callaway) – 4:53
14. "Auld Lang Syne (Ballad)" (adapted by Robert Burns) – 1:49
15. "Dialogue" (Barbra and Brother Time) – 0:51
16. "People" (Styne, Merrill) – 3:46
17. "New Year's Eve/Auld Lang Syne" (Celebration) – 6:00
18. "Everytime You Hear Auld Lang Syne" (Barbra/Audience) (Hamlisch, A. Bergman, M. Bergman) – 4:22
19. "Happy Days Are Here Again" (Ager, Yellen) – 3:33
20. "Don't Like Goodbyes" (Arlen, Capote) – 1:42
21. "I Believe/Somewhere" (with Lauren Frost) (Ervin Drake, Irvin Graham, Jimmy Shirl, Al Stillman / Bernstein, Sondheim) – 8:42

== Personnel ==
NOTE: Some performers do not appear in person.

- Bryan Adams – vocals
- Robert L. Adcock – celli
- Louis Armstrong – trumpet
- Steve Becknell – french horn
- Douglas Besterman – arranger
- Chris Bishop – engineer
- Peggie Blu – backing vocals
- Chris Boardman – arranger
- Ralph Burns – arranger, adaptation
- Jorge Calandrelli – arranger
- Darius Campo – violin
- Chris Carlton – engineer
- Jon Clarke – woodwind
- John Clayton – arranger
- Don Costa – arranger
- Joe Covello – photography
- Debbie Datz-Pyle – contractor
- Mario de Leon – violin
- Neil Diamond – vocals
- Celine Dion – vocals
- Chuck Domanico – bass
- Bruce Dukov – violin
- Sam Emerson – photography
- Martin Erlichman – executive producer
- Bob Esty – arranger, conductor
- David Ewart – violin
- Peter Fletcher – product manager
- David Foster – arranger
- Bruce Fowler – trombone
- Ian Freebairn-Smith – arranger
- Lauren Frost – vocals
- Matt Funes – viola
- Judy Garland – vocals
- Barry Gibb – vocals
- Phil Gitomer – technical manager
- Savion Glover – actor
- Mark Graham – librarian
- Gary Grant – trumpet
- Dan Greco – percussion
- Henry Grossman – photography
- Marvin Hamlisch – arranger, director
- Jack Hayes – arranger
- Gwen Heller – violin
- Randee Heller – vocals
- David Hewitt - recording engineer
- Remote Recording's Silver Truck
- Ryan Hewitt – assistant engineer
- Jerry Hey – trumpet
- Dan Higgins – woodwind
- Jim Hoffman – librarian
- Rupert Holmes – arranger
- Carrie Holzman-Little – viola
- Paul Jabara – arranger
- Bruce Jackson – sound design
- Ron Jannelli – woodwind
- Alan Kaplan – trombone
- Eddie Karam – arranger
- Suzie Katayama – celli
- Steve Khan – narrator
- Jay Landers – executive producer
- Alec Ledd – vocals
- Annie Leibovitz – photography
- Brian Leonard – violin
- Warren Leuning – trumpet
- Gayle Levant – harp
- Dane Little – celli
- Charles Loper – trombone
- Jeremy Lubbock – arranger
- Stephen Marcussen – mastering
- Nick Marshall – mixing
- Peter Matz – arranger, producer
- Kevin Mazur – photography
- Ed Meares – bass
- Don Mischer – producer
- Suzette Moriarty – French horn
- Horia Moroaica – violin
- Ralph Morrison – concert master
- Peter Morse – lighting design, lighting director
- Dan Newfeld – viola
- Robin Olson – violin
- Kenny Ortega – writer, assistant director
- Marty Paich – arranger
- Dean Parks – guitar
- Joel Peskin – woodwind
- Barbara Porter – violin
- Sid Ramin – arranger
- Tom Ranier – keyboards
- Gabrielle Raumberger – art direction, design
- Dave Reitzas – mixing
- Nelson Riddle – arranger
- Bruce Roberts – arranger
- Gil Romero – violin
- William James Ross – arranger
- Randee Saint Nicholas – photography
- Mark Sazer – violin
- Walter Scharf – arranger
- Harry Shirinian – viola
- John Simpson – engineer
- Frank Sinatra – vocals
- Kim Skalecki – assistant
- Lew Soloff – trumpet
- Michael Starobin – arranger
- Barbra Streisand – director, vocals, producer, writer
- Neil Stubenhaus – electric bass
- Shari Sutcliffe – project coordinator
- Karen Swenson – consultant, photo research
- Sydney Philharmonia Choirs - backing choir
- Phil Teele – trombone
- Alberto Tolot – photography
- Bob Tricarico – woodwind
- Charles Valentino – actor
- Fred Vogler – engineer
- Jürgen Vollmer – photography
- Randy Waldman – arranger, keyboards
- Brad Warnaar – French horn
- Phil Yao – French horn
- Ken Yerke – violin
- Firooz Zahedi – photography, cover photo
- Patty Zimmitti – contractor
- Robert Zimmitti – percussion
- Torrie Zito – arranger

== Charts ==
Weekly chart performance for Timeless: Live in Concert
| Chart (2000) | Peak position |
|---|---|
| Australian Albums (ARIA) | 66 |
| Italian Albums (Musica e dischi) | 48 |
| UK Albums (Official Charts) | 54 |
| US Billboard 200 | 21 |

== Certifications and sales ==
| Region | Certification | Certified units/sales |
Album
| United States (RIAA) | Platinum | 500,000^{^} |
Video
| Australia (ARIA) | Platinum | 15,000^{^} |
| United States (RIAA) | Platinum | 100,000^{^} |
^{^} Shipments figures based on certification alone.
