= Before You Go =

Before You Go may refer to:

- Before You Go (novel), a 1960 novel by Jerome Weidman
- Before You Go (Buck Owens album), a 1965 album by Buck Owens and his Buckaroos
  - "Before You Go" (Buck Owens song), 1965
- Before You Go (Blxst album), 2022
- "Before You Go" (Candice Alley song), 2007
- "Before You Go" (Lewis Capaldi song), 2019
- Before You Go (film), a 2002 comedy film directed by Lewis Gilbert
- Before You Go (play), a 1968 comedy play written by Lawrence Holofcener
- "Before You Go", a 2020 song by Moses Sumney from Græ
- "Before You Go", a 2024 song by The Script from Satellites
