= Grace Keagy =

American actress

Grace Keagy (née Stambaugh; December 16, 1921 – October 4, 2009) was an American actress, best known for her work on the stage in character roles. She is best known for her Drama Desk Award-nominated performance as "Rosa" in the original 1979 production of Joseph Stein and Alan Jay Lerner's Carmelina.

== Career ==
Grace Stambaugh was born in Youngstown, Ohio, and ultimately settled in Minneapolis where she taught voice and piano between 1964 and 1968. She made her first professional stage appearance in 1967 as Dame Margery in Thomas Dekker's The Shoemaker's Holiday at the Guthrie Theater after which she became active in regional theatre productions. She made her Broadway theatre debut in 1975 as Queen Isabella of Bavaria in the original production of Larry Grossman and lyrics by Hal Hackady's Goodtime Charley.

In 1979, she returned to Broadway in January to portray several smaller roles in the original production of Jerry Herman's The Grand Tour. After the show closed in March, she went into rehearsals for Carmelina which premiered on April 8, 1979, at the St. James Theatre. Although the show ran for only a few weeks, Keagy garnered high praise from critics for her performance and earned a Drama Desk Award nomination. She almost immediately joined the original cast of Richard Rodgers's musical version I Remember Mama, replacing Dolores Wilson as Aunt Jenny. After that show closed in September, she spent the following year touring the United States as Aunt Eller in Oklahoma!.

Keagy remained active in theatre during the early 1980s, returning to Broadway for the original productions of Tom Savage's Musical Chairs (1980) and John Kander and Fred Ebb's Woman of the Year (1983).

She made her first television appearance as a guest star on Our Family Honor in 1985, later appearing in Four Eyes and Six Guns (1992), Mrs. Santa Claus (1996) and numerous times on soap operas like As the World Turns, One Life to Live, The Doctors, Ryan's Hope, and Search for Tomorrow.

== Family ==
Keagy was predeceased by her husband, Robert B. Keagy, and her brother William Stambaugh. She was survived by five children, twelve grandchildren, and extended family.

== Death ==
Keagy died on October 4, 2009, in Rochester, New York, aged 87, from ovarian cancer.
