= I Can Get It for You Wholesale =

1962 Broadway musical

I Can Get It For You Wholesale
- Broadway opening Playbill
- Music: Harold Rome
- Lyrics: Harold Rome
- Book: Jerome Weidman
- Basis: Novel by Jerome Weidman
- Productions: 1962 Broadway; 1962 National tour; 1991 Off-Broadway; 2023 Off-Broadway revival

I Can Get It for You Wholesale is a musical originally produced by David Merrick, with music and lyrics by Harold Rome, and book by Jerome Weidman, based on his 1937 novel of the same title. Its 1962 production marked the Broadway debut of 19-year-old Barbra Streisand, who was nominated for the Tony Award for Best Featured Actress in a Musical. The story is set in the New York City Garment District in 1937, during the Great Depression, and the songs utilize traditional Jewish harmonies evocative of the setting and the period of the show.

== Background ==
In the album Just for the Record, Streisand recalls, "My first audition for the show was on the morning after Thanksgiving in 1961. Since the action took place in the 1930s, I showed up in a '30s fur coat that I'd bought in a thrift shop for $10. I sang three songs, including my new standby "A Sleepin' Bee". They asked me to come back and gave me "Miss Marmelstein" to learn for my second audition a few hours later." Harold Rome said, "The 'Miss Marmelstein' number was written before the casting of Barbra Streisand in the role, but her part was then enlarged. Somebody is that good ... you try to use them as much as possible."

== Productions ==
The musical premiered on Broadway at the Shubert Theatre on March 22, 1962. Directed by Arthur Laurents and choreographed by Herbert Ross, it starred Elliott Gould as Harry Bogen. In addition to Streisand in the small role of Bogen's secretary, Miss Marmelstein, the supporting cast included Lillian Roth as Mrs. Bogen and Marilyn Cooper as Ruthie Rivkin, with Harold Lang, Bambi Linn, Ken LeRoy, and Sheree North. On October 1, it transferred to The Broadway Theatre, where it closed on December 9 after a total run of two previews and 300 performances. Gould and Streisand later married.

The American Jewish Theatre staged a 1991 revival directed and choreographed by Richard Sabellico. The production starred Evan Pappas as Bogen, Carolee Carmello as Ruthie, Jim Brachitta as Teddy, and Vicki Lewis as Miss Marmelstein. It was nominated for the Outer Critics Circle Award as Best Revival, and Best Actor in a Musical for Pappas.

Arcola Theatre in London, a former clothes factory, produced the show in 2002 for its second anniversary. The director was Mehmet Ergen with co-director William Galinsky.

Off-Broadway Classic Stage Company produced a revised version of the show in 2023, starring Santino Fontana, Judy Kuhn, and Julia Lester. The revival yielded a new cast recording, released early in 2025.

== Plot ==
Harry Bogen is an ambitious, unscrupulous young businessman in the 1930s New York City garment industry. He will stop at nothing to get to the top; he lies to his mother and his long-suffering girlfriend, Ruthie Rivkin. They try to help him become a better person, but Harry embezzles company funds and betrays his friends and partners. Harry leaves Ruthie for Martha Mills, a gold-digging dancer as tough and hard as the diamonds Harry rewards her with. But Harry goes bankrupt and loses his fair-weather friends. Only his mother and Ruthie stand by him, but a surprising ally re-emerges from the past.

== Casts ==
Cast lists for main characters, by production
Role	Original Broadway (1962)	National tour (1962)	Off-Broadway revival (1991)	Off-Broadway revival (2023)
Harry Bogen	Elliott Gould	Larry Kert	Evan Pappas	Santino Fontana
Maurice Pulvermacher	Jack Kruschen	Jay Sadler	Joel Brooks	Adam Grupper
Miss Marmelstein	Barbra Streisand	Carol Arthur	Vicki Lewis	Julia Lester
Ruthie Rivkin	Marilyn Cooper	Andrea Stevens	Carolee Carmello	Rebecca Naomi Jones
Meyer Bushkin	Ken LeRoy	Michael Shaw	Richard Levine	Adam Chanler-Berat
Mrs. Ida Bogen	Lillian Roth	Fritzi Burr	Patti Karr	Judy Kuhn
Martha Mills	Sheree North	Nan Courtney	Deborah Carlson	Joy Woods
Blanche Bushkin	Bambi Linn	Sandra Kent	Alix Korey	Sarah Steele
Teddy Asch	Harold Lang	Tony Monaco	Jim Bracchitta	Greg Hildreth

== Songs ==
Original Broadway (1962)

Act I

- "Overture"
- "I'm Not a Well Man" – Miss Marmelstein and Mr. Pulvermacher
- "The Way Things Are" – Harry Bogen
- "When Gemini Meets Capricorn" – Ruthie Rivkin and Harry Bogen
- "Momma, Momma, Momma" – Harry Bogen and Mrs. Bogen
- "The Sound of Money" – Harry Bogen, Martha Mills, Mitzi, Mario and Eddie
- "The Family Way" – Mrs. Bogen, Harry Bogen, Ruthie Rivkin, Teddy Asch, Blanche Bushkin and Meyer Bushkin
- "Too Soon" – Mrs. Bogen
- "Who Knows?" – Ruthie Rivkin
- "Have I Told You Lately?" – Blanche Bushkin and Meyer Bushkin
- "Ballad of the Garment Trade" – Miss Marmelstein, Ruthie Rivkin, Blanche Bushkin, Harry Bogen, Teddy Asch, Meyer Bushkin and Company

Act II

- "A Gift Today" – Sheldon Bushkin, Harry Bogen, Mrs. Bogen, Blanche Bushkin, Meyer Bushkin and Ruthie Rivkin
- "Miss Marmelstein" – Miss Marmelstein
- "The Sound of Money (Reprise)" – Harry Bogen
- "A Funny Thing Happened" – Ruthie Rivkin and Harry Bogen
- "What's in It for Me?" – Teddy Asch and Martha Mills
- "What Are They Doing to Us Now?" – Miss Marmelstein, Buggo, Tootsie Maltz, Manette, Gail, Miss Springer and Creditors
- "Eat a Little Something" – Mrs. Bogen and Harry Bogen
- "Epilogue" – The Company

Off-Broadway Revision (2023)

Act I

- "Prologue
- "Eat a Little Something" – Mrs. Bogen and Young Harry
- "Somebody Else" – Mr. Pulvermacher and Company
- "The Way Things Are" – Harry Bogen
- "When Gemini Meets Capricorn" - Ruthie Rivkin and Harry Bogen
- "Momma, Momma, Momma" – Harry Bogen and Mrs. Bogen
- "The Family Way" – Mrs. Bogen, Harry Bogen, Ruthie Rivkin, Teddy Asch, Blanche Bushkin and Meyer Bushkin
- "Too Soon" – Mrs. Bogen
- "Who Knows?" – Ruthie Rivkin
- "The Sound of Money" – Harry Bogen and Martha Mills
- "Miss Marmelstein" – Miss Marmelstein
- "Have I Told You Lately?" – Blanche Bushkin and Meyer Bushkin
- "Ballad of the Garment Trade" – Ruthie Rivkin, Miss Marmelstein, Teddy Asch, and Company

Act II

- "A Gift Today" – Sheldon Bushkin, Harry Bogen, Teddy Asch, Meyer Bushkin, Mrs. Bogen, Ruthie Rivkin, and Blanche Bushkin
- "Grab Them While I Can/Love Is Not Enough" – Martha Mills and Ruthie Rivkin
- "Have I Told You Lately (Reprise 1)" – Meyer Bushkin and Harry Bogen
- "Have I Told You Lately (Reprise 2)"/"On My Way To Love" – Harry Bogen and Ruthie Rivkin
- "What's In It for Me?" – Teddy Asch and Martha Mills
- "What Are They Doing to Us Now?" – Miss Marmelstein and Company
- "Eat a Little Something (Reprise)" – Mrs. Bogen and Harry Bogen
- "Finale" – Harry Bogen and Company

== Awards and nominations ==
=== 1962 Broadway production ===
Year	Award	Category	Nominee	Result
1962	Tony Awards	Best Featured Actress in a Musical	Barbra Streisand	Nominated

=== 2023 Off-Broadway production ===
Year	Award	Category	Nominee	Result
2024	Lucille Lortel Awards	Outstanding Revival		Nominated
2024	Lucille Lortel Awards	Outstanding Leading Performer in a Musical	Santino Fontana	Nominated
2024	Drama League Awards	Outstanding Revival of a Musical		Nominated
2024	Outer Critics Circle Awards	Outstanding Revival of a Musical		Won
2024	Outer Critics Circle Awards	Outstanding Featured Performer in a Musical	Judy Kuhn	Won
2024	Drama Desk Award	Outstanding Revival of a Musical		Won
2024	Drama Desk Award	Outstanding Lead Performance in a Musical	Santino Fontana	Nominated

== Recordings ==
The original cast recording was released by Columbia Records. According to Gary Marmorstein, "Columbia badly wanted Harold Rome's I Can Get it For You Wholesale. As an inducement to Rome [Goddard] Lieberson offered to record the twenty-fifth anniversary version of his International Ladies' Garment Workers' Union show Pins and Needles."

Goddard Lieberson, who produced the Wholesale cast album for Columbia Records, signed Streisand to a contract, and her first solo album was released two months after the show closed.

Stage Door Records reissued the original cast album in 2022 as a two-disc "deluxe edition", expanded with demo tracks, instrumentals, and cover versions by artists including Tony Bennett and Robert Goulet.

The show's 2023 "revisal" production generated a new cast recording in 2025.

== Response ==
The musical garnered mixed reviews and lost money despite a run of 300 performances. As theatre historian Ken Mandelbaum noted, How to Succeed in Business Without Really Trying had opened five months earlier with a similar, but more palatable, story. J. Pierrepont Finch is a much more "cuddly betrayer... and audiences were less willing to confront Wholesale's unflinching portrayal of Harry's little world of "men and ulcers on parade... that shouldn't detract from the fact that it was a daring and distinctive musical.".

Howard Taubman of The New York Times wrote that the show generated a "lot of momentum" and added, "It is spirited in its appreciation of the garment-trade milieu, and both winning and tearfully sentimental in its treatment of Jewish folks and some of their Bronx folkways." He thought the score was pleasant, using "folklife motifs to distill the flavor of Jewish life." Saving the most lavish praise for last, he wrote that Streisand was the "evening's find... a girl with an oafish expression, a loud irascible voice and an arpeggiated laugh. Miss Streisand is a natural comedienne."

The Time critic observed, "Wholesale relies heavily on Jewish folk and speech ways. But as comedy, Jewish dialect is in awkward transition, no longer funny and not yet English. Harold Rome's score is drab and his lyrics resemble either singing dialogue or nursery rhymes... Harold Lang and Sheree North make a scorching sex rite out of 'What's In It for Me?'... Barbra Streisand trips the show into stray laughs. For the rest, Wholesale is as quiet as Seventh Avenue on Yom Kippur."
