= The Fig Leaves Are Falling =

1969 Broadway musical

- Broadhurst Theatre marquee
- Music: Albert Hague
- Lyrics: Allan Sherman
- Book: Allan Sherman
- Productions: 1969 Broadway

The Fig Leaves Are Falling is a musical with a book and lyrics by Allan Sherman and music by Albert Hague. It was inspired by Sherman's 1966 divorce following 21 years of marriage. The original Broadway production featured Barry Nelson, Dorothy Loudon and Jenny O'Hara; David Cassidy made his professional acting debut in a small role.

The production was a flop, with only four performances and negative critical reviews.

== Production ==
The musical opened on Broadway at the Broadhurst Theatre on January 2, 1969, and closed on January 6 after four performances and 17 previews. Directed by George Abbott and choreographed by Eddie Gasper, the scenic design was by William and Jean Eckart, costume design was by Robert Mackintosh, and lighting design was by Tharon Musser.

Dorothy Loudon won the Drama Desk Award for Outstanding Performance and was nominated for the Tony Award for Best Actress in a Musical.

A revised version by Ben West, who also directed, was presented by the UnsungMusicalsCo. in January 2013 at the Off-Off-Broadway Connelly Theater.

=== Background ===
The first director, Jack Klugman, left the production prior to rehearsals, and George Abbott was then hired as director. The cast included Jules Munshin, who left during the out of town tryout in Philadelphia. Ben West noted that during the tryout period "substantial structural changes persisted, with multiple musical numbers being assigned to different characters while others were eliminated altogether..."

== Original cast and characters ==
Character	Broadway (1969)
Lillian Stone	Dorothy Loudon
Harry Stone	Barry Nelson
Pookie Chapman	Jenny O'Hara
Mr. Mittleman	Jay Barney
Cecilia	Louise Quick
Billy Stone	David Cassidy
Gelb	Frank De Sal
Mrs. Stone	Helon Blount
Mary, Queen of Scots	Anna Pagan
Le Roy	Alan Weeks
Mimsy	Marilyne Mason
Elizabeth Marsden	Pat Trott

== Songs ==
Act I

- All Is Well in Larchmont
- Lillian
- Like Yours
- All of My Laughter
- Give Me a Cause
- Today I Saw a Rose
- We
- For Our Sake
- Light One Candle
- Oh, Boy

Act II

- The Fig Leaves Are Falling
- For the Rest of My Life
- I Like It
- Broken Heart
- Old Fashioned Song
- Lillian, Lillian, Lillian
- Did I Ever Really Live
- All of My Laughter

== Critical response ==
Clive Barnes in his review for The New York Times, wrote: "There is nothing much wrong ...that a new book, new music, new lyrics, new settings, new direction, new choreography and a partially new cast would not quite possibly put right."

Daniel M. Gold, reviewing the 2013 production for The New York Times, wrote: "...in the end the songs and their chronicle of temptation disappoint. There is little of the snap or crackle of Sherman’s best lyrics, and Hague’s music is forgettable."
