= United Nations on the March =

1942 song by Dmitri Shostakovich

United Nations National Anthem
- Official anthem of the Allies of World War II
- Lyrics: Harold Rome, 1942
- Music: Dmitri Shostakovich, 1932
- Adopted: 1942
- Relinquished: 1945
- Succeeded by: Hymn to the United Nations (de-facto, as the anthem of the United Nations in 1971)

"United Nations on the March" is a song composed by Dmitri Shostakovich and with lyrics written by Harold Rome. The song was written with the intent of it serving as the anthem for the Allied Powers of World War II.

== Song ==
Dmitri Shostakovich was a successful Soviet composer, having composed many pieces such as the Seventh Symphony. The tune that would become the basis for "United Nations on the March" was composed by Shostakovich in 1932 for the film Counterplan. The English lyrics of "United Nations on the March" were composed by Harold Rome, an American composer and lyricist, in 1942. The song was intended to serve as the anthem for the Allied Powers, though it only served as such in an unofficial context.

== Usage ==
The song became a popular morale-booster during the war. It was the featured choral finale in the 1943 George Sidney musical and patriotic film Thousands Cheer. Paul Robeson performed the song with an additional second verse in his album Songs for Free Men 1940-1945.
