= Woman of the Year (musical) =

American musical

- Original Cast Recording
- Music: John Kander
- Lyrics: Fred Ebb
- Book: Peter Stone
- Basis: 1942 film Woman of the Year
- Productions: 1981 Broadway; 1983 First National Tour; 1983 Mexico; 1983 Argentina
- Awards: Tony Award for Best Score; Tony Award for Best Book

Woman of the Year is a musical with a book by Peter Stone and score by John Kander and Fred Ebb.

Based on the Ring Lardner Jr.-Michael Kanin written, Katharine Hepburn and Spencer Tracy starring 1942 film, the musical changes the newspaper reporters of the original to television personality Tess Harding and cartoonist Sam Craig, who experience difficulty merging their careers with their marriage. The musical premiered on Broadway in 1981 and starred Lauren Bacall.

== Plot ==
Just before Tess Harding, a nationally known television news personality, comes on stage to receive an award as "Woman of the Year", she reminisces about an on-air editorial that she gave denigrating newspaper comic strips. The article offended the cartoonists who frequent the Ink Pot saloon and inspired syndicated cartoonist Sam Craig to publish a caricature depicting her as a snob in his strip Katz. Tess is annoyed, but when the handsome and charming Sam shows up at her office, she apologizes and invites him to dinner. At the Ink Pot, she charms Sam and his colleagues by revealing her knowledge about comic art.

Tess and Sam begin a romance, move in together, and finally marry, but their busy careers leave little time for them to spend together, and their big egos pose problems in their marriage. In one of his comics, Katz quips that marriage is a breeze - it's the living together that's so damned hard. Tess is offended, an argument ensues, and Sam announces he no longer can deal with the couple's fraying love life. The time moves forward to the present, and it's time for Tess to accept her award, just as she has lost the man she loves.

Several weeks later, Tess is conflicted about her role as a powerful newswoman versus her role as a wife. She seeks advice from Russian ballet dancer Alexi Petrikov, whom she helped to defect. He tells her that he is returning to Russia, because the wife he left behind is more important than his career. Tess travels to visit first husband Larry Donovan and his wife Jan to discover why their marriage is a success. She decides to concentrate on her marriage and announces that she is resigning from her show. But Sam tells her that he wants her to keep her career; he just wants to be involved in the decisions in their relationship. They decide to work things out.

== Songs ==
Act I

- "Woman of the Year" – Tess and Women
- "The Poker Game" – Sam and Cartoonists
- "See You in the Funny Papers" – Sam
- "When You're Right, You're Right!" – Tess and Gerald
- "Shut Up, Gerald" – Tess, Sam and Gerald
- "So What Else Is New?" – Sam and Katz
- "One of the Boys" – Tess, Cartoonists, Maury and Men
- "Table Talk" – Tess and Sam
- "The Two of Us" – Tess and Sam
- "It Isn't Working" – Cartoonists, Chip, Helga, Gerald and New Yorkers
- "I Told You So" – Gerald and Helga
- "Woman of the Year (Reprise)" – Tess

Act II

- "So What Else Is New? (Reprise)" – Sam and Katz
- "I Wrote the Book" – Tess and Cleaning Women
- "Happy in the Morning" – Alexi, Tess and Dancers
- "Sometimes a Day Goes By" – Sam
- "The Grass Is Always Greener" – Tess and Jan
- "We're Gonna Work It Out" – Tess and Sam

== Original cast and characters ==
Character	Broadway (1981)	1st National Tour	Summer Stock Tour
Tess Harding	Lauren Bacall	Lauren Bacall	Barbara Eden
Sam Craig	Harry Guardino	Harry Guardino	Don Chastain
Pinky Peters	Gerry Vichi	Bill Bateman	Steven Kosinski
Phil Whittaker	Tom Avera	William H. McDonald	Larry Hansen
Ellis McMaster	Rex Hays	Ted Agress	Mace Barrett
Gerald Howe	Roderick Cook	Emory Bass	Edward Conery
Abbott Canfield	Lawrence Raiken	Dennis Parlato	Tom Flagg
Alexi Petrikov	Eivind Harum	James P. Hogan	Alexander Kramarevsky
Helga	Grace Keagy	Kathleen Freeman	Dolores Wilson
Chip Salisbury	Daren Kelly	John Hammil	Lee Chew
Floor Manager	Michael O'Gorman	Timm Stetzner	David Reitman
Chairperson	Helon Blount	Helon Blount	Irma Rogers
Maury	Rex Everhart	Michael Norris	Ken Ellis
Larry Donovan	Jamie Ross	Del Hinkley	Jered Holmes
Jan Donovan	Marilyn Cooper	Marilyn Cooper	Marilyn Cooper

== Productions ==
The Broadway production opened on March 29, 1981, at the Palace Theatre, where it ran for 770 performances and eleven previews. Directed by Robert Moore, the cast included Lauren Bacall, Harry Guardino, Marilyn Cooper, Grace Keagy, and Roderick Cook. Raquel Welch filled in for Bacall during her two-week vacation and later replaced her in the run. Debbie Reynolds replaced Welch in February 1983. Barbara Eden played Tess in the 1984 national tour.

Sets were designed by Tony Walton and costumes were by Theoni V. Aldredge, and choreography was by Tony Charmoli. Michael Sporn created an animated cat that danced and sang with Guardino.

The New York Times provided considerable information about the original production's finances: 10% of gross receipts to Bacall; 9% split by Stone, Kander, and Ebb; 4% to the producers; nearly 3% to director Moore, 2% to MGM for the stage adaptation rights to the film, 1.5% to choreographer Charmoli, smaller royalties to the scene and costume designers; the Palace theater's owners received operating costs and a ticket share averaging 6% of the gross.

Porchlight Music Theatre presented this show in November 2017 as a part of their "Porchlight Revisits" season in which they produce three forgotten musicals per year. This production was in Chicago, Illinois. It was directed by Artistic Director, Michael Weber, choreographed by Florence Walker Harris, and music directed by David Fiorello.

== Awards and nominations ==
=== Original Broadway production ===
Year	Award	Category	Nominee	Result
1981	Tony Award	Best Musical		Nominated
1981	Tony Award	Best Book of a Musical	Peter Stone	Won
1981	Tony Award	Best Original Score	John Kander and Fred Ebb	Won
1981	Tony Award	Best Actress in a Musical	Lauren Bacall	Won
1981	Tony Award	Best Featured Actress in a Musical	Marilyn Cooper	Won
1981	Tony Award	Best Direction of a Musical	Robert Moore	Nominated
1981	Drama Desk Award	Outstanding Featured Actress in a Musical	Marilyn Cooper	Won
