= Helon Blount =

American actress and singer

Helon Blount (January 15, 1929 – March 7, 2005) was an actress and singer who appeared in the original Broadway productions of such musicals as The Most Happy Fella, Woman of the Year and Follies.

== Biography ==
She was born in Big Spring, Texas and attended the fine arts and music school at the University of Texas. She sang in the chorus of the Dallas State Fair Musicals during two summers and, after earning her master's degree in voice pedagogy, she moved to New York City.

She appeared in the original production of Frank Loesser's The Most Happy Fella on Broadway in 1956. She originally understudied the role of "Cleo" and took over the role during the Broadway run. Forty years later, Blount played “Granny Briggs” in a revised version of Loesser's Greenwillow in 1997 at the Golden Apple Dinner Theatre in Sarasota, Florida. She received a "South Florida Sammie Award" as Best Supporting Actress in a Musical.

Other Broadway credits included playing “Dee Dee West” in the original production of Stephen Sondheim's Follies (1971) (also understudying the roles of Hattie and Stella), Do I Hear a Waltz? (1965), Musical Chairs and The Fig Leaves Are Falling (1969). In Kander and Ebb's Woman of the Year (1981), which starred Lauren Bacall, Blount played several characters. Blount also appeared in Riverwind in 1962, an Off-Broadway musical.

== Personal ==
Blount died on March 7, 2005. Blount's husband, Keith Kaldenberg, whom she met as a member of the cast of The Most Happy Fella, predeceased her. Their daughter Kim survives her parents.
