= The Reporter (TV series) =

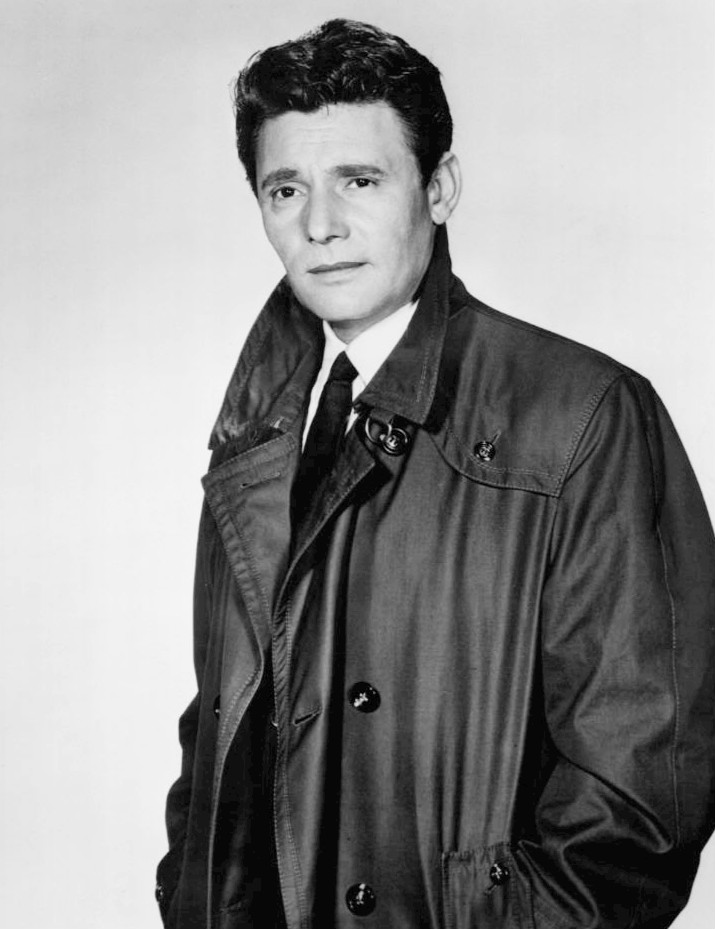
- Harry Guardino as Danny Taylor
- Genre: Drama
- Created by: Jerome Weidman
- Developed by: Keefe Brasselle
- Written by: Jerome Weidman
- Directed by: Tom Gries; Paul Stanley
- Starring: Harry Guardino; Gary Merrill; George O'Hanlon; Remo Pisani
- Composers: Kenyon Hopkins; Craig C. Kellem
- Country of origin: United States
- Original language: English
- No. of seasons: 1
- No. of episodes: 13

Production
- Executive producers: Keefe Brasselle; John Simon
- Producer: Joel Freeman
- Running time: 45 min
- Production company: Richielieu Productions

Original release
- Network: CBS
- Release: September 25 – December 18, 1964

The Reporter is an American drama series that was broadcast by CBS from September 25 to December 18, 1964. The series was created by Jerome Weidman and developed by executive producers Keefe Brasselle and John Simon.

== Cast ==
- Harry Guardino as Danny Taylor
- Gary Merrill
- George O'Hanlon
- Remo Pisani as Ike Dawson

== Episodes ==
Episode #	Episode title	Original airdate
1-1	"Extension Seven"	September 25, 1964
1-2	"Hideout"	October 2, 1964
1-3	"How Much for a Prince?"	October 9, 1964
1-4	"Rope's End"	October 16, 1964
1-5	"Rachel's Mother"	October 23, 1964
1-6	"No Comment"	October 30, 1964
1-7	"The Man Behind the Man"	November 6, 1964
1-8	"He Stuck in His Thumb"	November 13, 1964
1-9	"Super-Star"	November 20, 1964
1-10	"Murder by Scandal"	November 27, 1964
1-11	"A Time to Be Silent"	December 4, 1964
1-12	"The Lost Lady Blues"	December 11, 1964
1-13	"Vote for Murder"	December 18, 1964
