= Pins and Needles =

- Music: Harold Rome
- Lyrics: Harold Rome
- Book: Arthur Arent; Marc Blitzstein; Emmanuel Eisenberg; Charles Friedman; David Gregory; Joseph Schrank; Arnold B. Horwitt; John Latouche; Harold Rome
- Productions: 1937 Broadway

Pins and Needles is a musical revue of songs by Harold Rome, with a book by Arthur Arent, Marc Blitzstein, Emmanuel Eisenberg, Charles Friedman, David Gregory, Joseph Schrank, Arnold B. Horwitt, John Latouche, and Rome. The title Pins and Needles was created by Max Danish, long-time editor of the International Ladies Garment Workers Union (ILGWU) newspaper Justice.

The revue first ran on Broadway from 1937 to 1940, with a special White House performance in 1938 for President Franklin D. Roosevelt and his wife Eleanor.

An Off-Broadway revival was staged in 1978. A London production in 2010 received positive reviews. The show ran at the Provincetown Playhouse in 2016, produced by the Steinhardt School at New York University.

== Background ==
The International Ladies Garment Workers Union used the Princess Theatre in New York City as a meeting hall. The union sponsored an inexpensive revue with ILGWU workers as the cast and two pianos. Because of their factory jobs, participants could rehearse only at night and on weekends, and initial performances were presented only on Friday and Saturday nights. The original cast was made up of cutters, basters, and sewing machine operators.

Pins and Needles looked at current events from a pro-union standpoint. It was a "lighthearted look at young workers in a changing society in the middle of America's most politically engaged city." Skits spoofed everything from Fascist European dictators to bigots in the Daughters of the American Revolution society. Word-of-mouth was so enthusiastically positive that the cast abandoned their day jobs; the production expanded to a full performance schedule of eight shows per week. New songs and skits were introduced every few months to keep the show topical.

According to John Kenrick, Pins and Needles "is the only hit ever produced by a labor union, and the only time when a group of unknown non-professionals brought a successful musical to Broadway."

== Productions ==
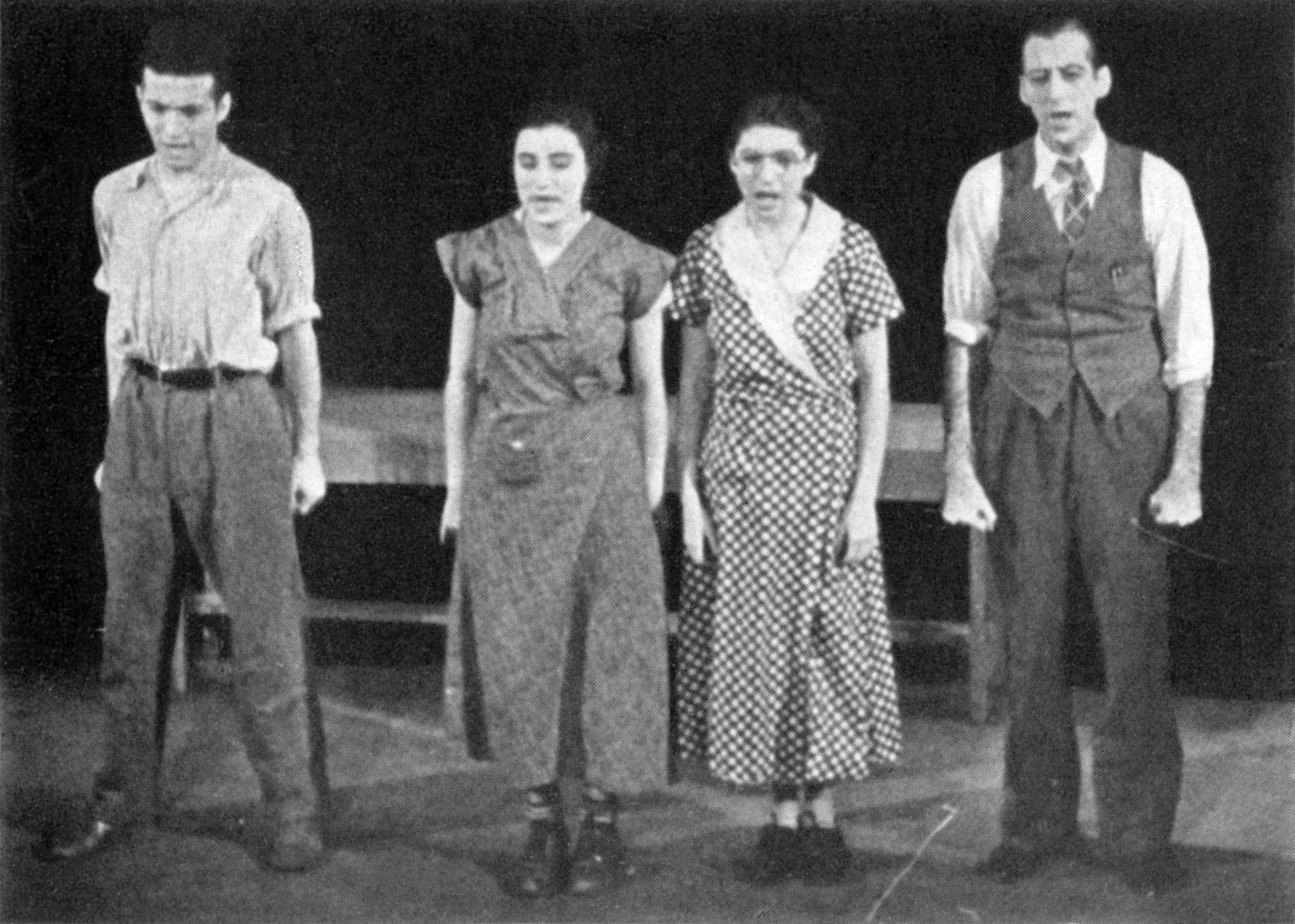
Four ILGWU cast members performing Pins and Needles (December 1937)

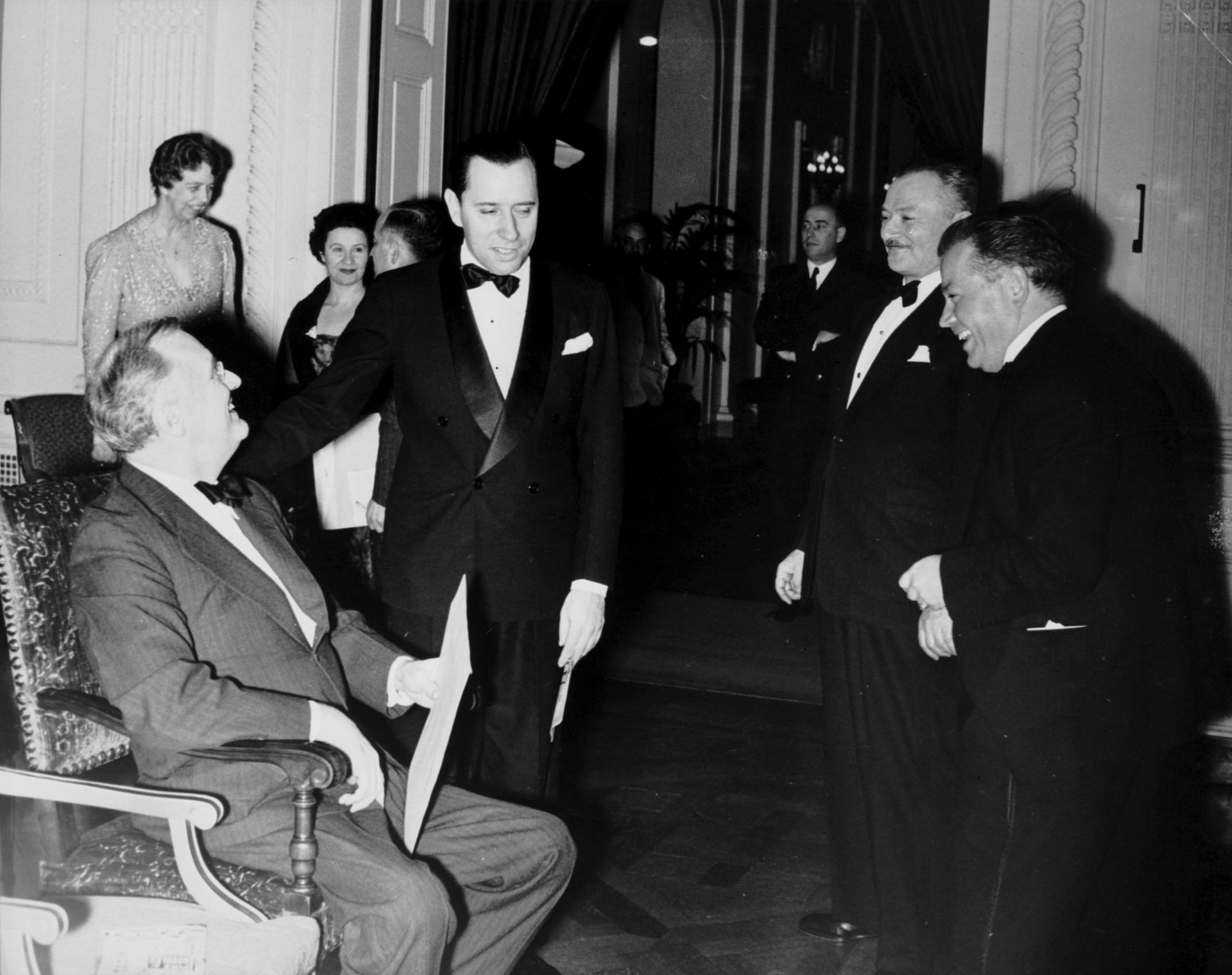
Franklin D. Roosevelt, Eleanor Roosevelt, David and Emma Dubinsky, Max Danish and others at a White House performance of Pins and Needles (March 3, 1938)

Originally written for a small theatrical production with music and lyrics by Harold Rome, the first production of Pins and Needles was directed by Samuel Roland. After a two-week professional run, it was adapted for performances by members of the then-striking International Ladies Garment Workers' Union as an entertainment for its members. Because Roland was associated with left-wing causes, he was asked by ILGWU president David Dubinsky to withdraw.

The better-known ILGWU production was directed by Charles Friedman and choreographed by Benjamin Zemach. It opened on November 27, 1937, at the Labor Stage Theatre and transferred to the Windsor Theatre on June 26, 1939, finally closing on June 22, 1940, after 1,108 performances. The cast included Harry Clark. The production was directed by the African-American dancer Katherine Dunham.

The revue was performed in 1938 in the White House for President Franklin D. Roosevelt and First Lady Eleanor Roosevelt. Brooks Atkinson, perhaps the most important theater critic at the time, wrote that "Pins and Needles is a gay, satirical revue, which is amusing, as Mrs. Roosevelt knows, for she has recently sealed it with the cachet of the White House".

When the musical was set to play in Providence, Rhode Island, in October 1940, The New York Times reported that the Providence Bureau of Police and Fire "ruled...that the musical hit 'Pins and Needles' cannot play in [Providence] until one of its scenes is deleted." The scene in question satirized the anti-Jewish, pro-fascist Catholic priest Father Coughlin, the German American Bund leader Fritz Kuhn, and Democratic Party U.S. Senator from North Carolina Robert Reynolds. The New York Times reported that the producers cut the scene but under protest.

The Roundabout Theatre Company produced a revival Off-Broadway at the Roundabout Stage 1 Theatre in 1978, which ran for 225 performances.

The Jewish Repertory Theatre presented a concert in 2003, to include songs and sketches from all versions of the show.

Pins and Needles was presented in the UK for the first time at the Cock Tavern Theatre in Kilburn, London, in November and December 2010. The production was directed by Rachel Grunwald and received positive reviews from the theatre press.

In 2011, an updated version of the show was performed at The Foundry Theatre, in Fort Greene, Brooklyn, by members of the social-justice organization "FUREE" (Families United For Racial and Economic Equality).

In 2016, Pins and Needles ran at the Provincetown Playhouse in New York City, where it was produced by the Steinhardt School at New York University. The production was directed by Meg Bussert with orchestrations and musical supervision by Joseph Church. The cast featured NYU students, who would have been around the same ages as the actors in the original production.

== Songs ==
Act I

- "First Impression" - Entire Company
- "Why sing of Skies Above?" - Boys and Girls
- "Public Enemy No. 1" - Sung by Jean Nicita
- "The General is Unveiled" - General, Speaker, Secretary and Invited Guests
- "Sunday in the Park" - Papa, Mama, Boy, Girl, Cop, Balloon Man, Vendor, Couple, Man with Carriage, Lonesome Guy, Park Attendant, Radical, Man on Bench and Passersby
- "Dear Beatrice Fairfax" - Sung by Millie Weitz
- "Britannia Waives the Rules" (Sketch and Lyrics by: John La Touche and Arnold B. Horwitt, Music By Bernece Kazounoff - The Prime Minister, The Secretary of State for Foreign Affairs, The Secretary of State for War, The First Lord of the Admiralty, The German Envoy, The Japanese Envoy and Miss Beamish
- "Men Awake" - Singers and Dance Group

Act II

- "Lorelei On the Rocks" (Lyrics By John La Touche, Music By Bernece Kazounoff) - Die Lorelei and A Storm Trooper
- "Lesson In Etiquette" - The Expert
- "What Good is Love?" - Sung by Grace Quatropani
- "One Big Union for Two" - Girls and Boys
- "Vassar Girl Finds a Job" - Sung by Millie Weitz
- "Four Little Angels of Peace" - Anthony Eden, Mussolini, Japanese and Hitler, Mussolini, Japanese and Hitler
- "Slumming Party" - Mrs. Dalyrymple III, Mrs. Dalyrymple's Protege, Mrs. Dalyrymple's Nephew, Mrs. Dalyrymple's Aunt, Mrs. Dalyrymple's Uncle and Mrs. Dalyrymple's Chauffeur
- "We've Just Begun" (Lyrics By Charles Friedman and Harold J. Rome) - Entire Company

== 25th anniversary recording ==
In commemoration of the show's 25th anniversary, in May 1962, Columbia Records released a studio recording of the score featuring then-newcomer Barbra Streisand. Columbia president Goddard Lieberson did not approve Streisand's involvement with this record until pressured by Harold Rome. She remained unsigned to Columbia until October 1, 1962. The recording was digitally restored and remastered for CD release.

=== Track listing ===
Streisand vocals featured in bold.

1. "Sing Me a Song With Social Significance" [2:52]
2. "**Doing the Reactionary**" [2:01]
3. "One Big Union for Two" [2:57]
4. "It's Better With a Union Man" [3:03]
5. "**Nobody Makes a Pass At Me**" [4:17]
6. "I've Got the Nerve to Be In Love" [4:46]
7. "**Not Cricket to Picket**" [2:29]
8. "Back to Work" [2:13]
9. "**(Sitting on Your) Status Quo**" [4:27]
10. "When I Grow Up (The G-Man Song)" [2:49]
11. "Chain Store Daisy" [3:50]
12. "**Four Little Angels of Peace**" [4:36]
13. "Sunday In the Park" [3:31]
14. "**What Good Is Love?**" [3:38]
15. "Mene, Mene, Tekel" [3:51]
