= Before You Go (novel) =

1960 novel by Jerome Weidman

Before You Go is a 1960 novel by Jerome Weidman, published by Random House.

== Plot summary ==
In 1943, Italian American soldier Julie Sarno is doing a routine secretarial job at a United States Army office in wartime London, the most risky part of her job being to avoid the unwanted amorous advances of a womanizing general. Suddenly, she is taken in complete secrecy to the Carlton Hotel and told that she has an assignment which can influence the course of the war. Ben Ivey, a senior White House official of President Roosevelt's inner circle, has secretly arrived in London on a vital mission, having to do with the forthcoming invasion of Nazi-occupied Europe - and then been struck by a mysterious, incapacitating malady. Doctors can do nothing to help him, and he insisted that Julie is the only person who can help him.

In fact, Julie had known Ben Ivey for sixteen years. As readers learn from the flashbacks which form a large part of the plot, she first met him in 1927 - when she was a precocious 11-year-old girl and he was a young social worker at a local settlement house on the Lower East Side slum where she grew up. At one time she had been madly in love with him, later she came to greatly hate and despise him because of a tragic love triangle involving herself, him and her beloved elder sister Celia.

The book follows back and forth this tangled relationship, from the slum childhood, through an Oregon land-reclamation project in the early years of the New Deal, and up to the tense standoff at the hotel room in WWII London. In the final chapters, secrets which have been suppressed for many years come out at last. On the highly emotional development of the protagonists' personal relationships hinges the success of a major WWII military operation, involving thousands of soldiers, numerous civilians living under Nazi occupation, a risky mission behind enemy lines, and the young exile King of a Scandinavian country.

== Critical reception ==
Kirkus Reviews noted that "Her [julie's] success and her challenging of Ben light up the dark memories of their earlier associations and indicate a change for the future. Leadership and the qualities of a leader are mirrored in Ben's career while the Sarnos -- believing, distrusting or unmoved by his persuasions -- find their strengths in their Italian-American origins".
