= Thousands Cheer =

1943 film by George Sidney

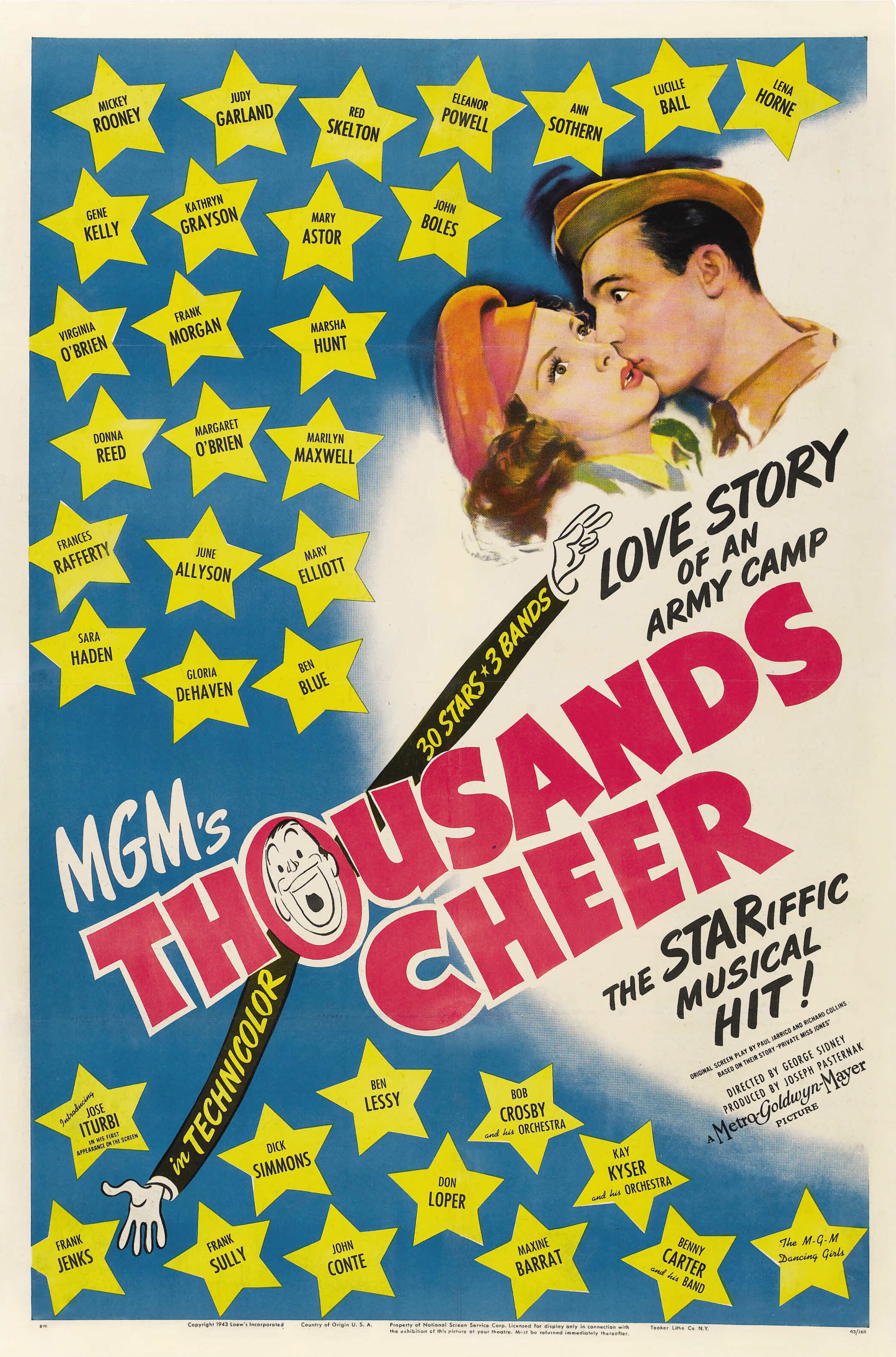
- Theatrical release poster
- Directed by: George Sidney
- Written by: Paul Jarrico; Richard Collins
- Produced by: Joe Pasternak
- Starring: Kathryn Grayson; Gene Kelly; Mary Astor; John Boles; Ben Blue; Frances Rafferty
- Cinematography: George J. Folsey
- Edited by: George Boemler
- Music by: Herbert Stothart
- Production company: Metro-Goldwyn-Mayer
- Distributed by: Loew's, Inc.
- Release date: September 13, 1943
- Running time: 125 minutes
- Country: United States
- Language: English
- Budget: $1,568,000
- Box office: $5,886,000

Thousands Cheer is a 1943 American musical comedy film directed by George Sidney and released by Metro-Goldwyn-Mayer. Produced during the Second World War, the film was intended as a morale booster for American troops and their families.

== Plot ==
The film is essentially a two-part program. The first half consists of a romantic comedy storyline involving an aerialist who is drafted into the US Army but really wants to join the Air Force. During training, he falls in love with Kathryn, the daughter of his commanding officer, who has similarly put her singing career on hold in order to serve by providing entertainment for the troops. Unusually for this type of film (and for this era of Hollywood), the character Kathryn has only recently met her father for the first time since she was a baby, her parents having separated but remaining married. A related subplot has Kathryn conniving to get her parents to reconcile. During the first part of the film, Grayson sings several numbers and Kelly performs one of his most famous routines dancing with a mop as a partner.

The secondary plot involves preparations for a major live show for the soldiers which feature many MGM musical and comedy stars. For this half, all pretenses of a storyline are effectively abandoned as the film instead becomes a variety showcase of comedy, song, and dance, with all of the performers (save Kelly and Grayson) appearing as themselves. The show portion is hosted by Mickey Rooney.

== Cast ==
- Kathryn Grayson as Kathryn Jones
- Gene Kelly as Private Eddie Marsh
- Mary Astor as Hyllary Jones
- John Boles as Colonel Bill Jones
- Ben Blue as Chuck Polansky
- Frances Rafferty as Marie Corbino
- Mary Elliott as Helen Corbino
- Frank Jenks as Sergeant Koslack
- Frank Sully as Alan
- Dick Simmons as Captain Fred Avery
- Ben Lessy as Silent Monk
- Sara Haden as Second Nurse

== Guest stars ==
Performing as "guest stars" in the film's show segment were: Judy Garland, Lena Horne, Red Skelton, Ann Sothern, Lucille Ball, Frank Morgan, Virginia O'Brien, Eleanor Powell, Marilyn Maxwell, June Allyson, Gloria DeHaven, Donna Reed, Margaret O'Brien, the Kay Kyser Orchestra, and others. Pianist-conductor José Iturbi appears as himself in both segments of the film; this was his first acting role in a film and he would go on to make several more appearances (usually playing himself) in MGM musicals.

== Musical numbers ==
Highlights included a performance of "Let Me Call You Sweetheart" by Kelly and a mop, "Honeysuckle Rose" by Horne and Benny Carter's band, a tap dance solo by Powell (making her first appearance in a color film and her final MGM movie until 1950's Duchess of Idaho), Kay Kyser's band delivering a frantic and humorous medley of "I Dug a Ditch in Wichita" and "Should I?", and a Garland performance (with classical pianist José Iturbi) of Roger Edens' "The Joint is Really Jumpin' in Carnegie Hall" which includes an early use of the word "rock" in a musical sense. During the phone scene with Grayson, Iturbi performs an excerpt from Franz Liszt's Rhapsodie #11.

"I Dug a Ditch in Wichita" (music by Burton Lane, lyrics by Lew Brown and Ralph Freed), a song told from the point of view of a soldier who used to dig ditches, is the movie's underlying theme song, performed several times in the film with different arrangements and approaches, climaxing in the above-mentioned Kay Kyser performance which runs four and a half minutes. The number showcases several of his featured performers and includes a few verses of another song, "Should I?". Grayson also sings a version, using an exaggerated (and out-of-character) "cowboy" accent, and Kelly dances to an instrumental version with a mop as his partner.

Earl K. Brent and Yip Harburg contributed the songs, "Let There Be Music" and "Private Miss Jones".

After a brief resumption (and resolution) of the earlier storyline, the film ends with Grayson leading an international chorus of men (the United Nations Chorus) in a song pleading for world peace. The song, entitled "United Nations on the March", actually predates the establishment of the United Nations political body by two years but not the Declaration by United Nations, which was made on 1 January 1942. The song used music by Dmitri Shostakovich from his famous "Song of the Counterplan" (the title song for the 1932 movie Counterplan), but the English-language text (by Harold Rome) had nothing to do with the original Russian lyrics. Due to misinterpretation of the name of the song's American version, some popular Russian media (e.g., Lenta.ru) reported that Shostakovich composed "the official UN Anthem".

== Reception ==
According to MGM records, the film earned $3,751,000 in the U.S. and Canada and $2,135,000 elsewhere, resulting in a profit of $2,228,000.

The New York Times: "A veritable grab-bag of delights. Musically there is something for all tastes, from Jose Iturbi to boogie-woogie, from Kathryn Grayson and Sempra Libera to Judy Garland and The Joint is Really Jumping!. It would have been easy for Metro's labor to result in a top-heavy production under a less resourceful producer than Joe Pasternak. His steadying hand is quite evident."

The New York Herald Tribune: "A prodigal and sumptuous picture. It is [Gene] Kelly who saves the picture from being merely a parade of personalities - Judy Garland is attractive as she gets Iturbi to bang out some swing rhythms on the piano. - George Sidney has staged it expansively."

== Awards ==
The film was nominated for three Academy Awards: Best Cinematography, Best Score, and Best Art Direction (Cedric Gibbons, Daniel B. Cathcart, Edwin B. Willis, Jacques Mersereau).

"Honeysuckle Rose" was nominated for the American Film Institute's 2004 list AFI's 100 Years...100 Songs.
