= Jerome Weidman =

American playwright and novelist (1913–1998)

- Born: April 4, 1913; New York City, United States
- Died: October 6, 1998 (aged 85); New York City, United States
- Education: City College of New York; New York University
- Spouse: Peggy Wright (1942–1998)
- Children: 2

Jerome Weidman (April 4, 1913, New York City – October 6, 1998, New York City) was an American playwright and novelist. He collaborated with George Abbott on the book for the musical Fiorello! with music by Jerry Bock, and lyrics by Sheldon Harnick. All received the 1960 Pulitzer Prize for Drama for the work.

== Biography ==
Weidman was born in Manhattan, New York City, and moved with his family to The Bronx after finishing high school at DeWitt Clinton. His parents were Jewish immigrants and his father Joseph worked in the garment trade. He also worked in the garment industry, which later provided him with book material, and attended City College of New York and New York University Law School, all the while writing stories and finally novels.

In his work he wrote about the "rough underside of business and politics -- and daily life -- in New York." The Independent obituary states: "There was precious little hope of salvation - indeed, precious little hope - in his early novels and often dazzling and highly crafted short stories, many of which inevitably found their way into Harold Ross's New Yorker during its Golden Age of the late Thirties and early Forties."

In the 1950s he used his ability for "speakable dialogue" in writing for the movies, which led to working with George Abbott on the musical Fiorello! in 1959.

He wrote the book for the musical I Can Get It for You Wholesale which was based on his first novel, and was Barbra Streisand's Broadway debut. The book was the source for a 1951 movie starring Susan Hayward, but used mainly the title.

He married Peggy Wright in 1942 and had two sons, John and Jeffrey.

== Archive ==
The papers of Jerome Weidman are held at the Harry Ransom Center at the University of Texas at Austin. There are over 100 boxes of Weidman's personal papers, including manuscript drafts of books, plays, musicals, essays, and extensive correspondences.

== Bibliography ==
=== Novels ===
- I Can Get It for You Wholesale (1937)
- What's in It for Me? (1938)
- I'll Never Go There Any More (1941)
- The Lights Around the Shore
- Too Early to Tell (1946)
- The Price Is Right (1949)
- Give Me Your Love (1952)
- The Hand of the Hunter (1953)
- The Third Angel (1953)
- Your Daughter Iris (1955)
- The Enemy Camp (1958)
- Before You Go (1960)
- The Sound of Bow Bells (1962)
- Word Of Mouth (1964)
- Other People's Money (1967)
- The Centre of the Action (1969)
- Fourth Street East (1970)
- Last Respects (1971)
- Tiffany Street (1974)
- A Family Fortune (1978)
- Counselors-at-law (1980)

=== Short stories ===
- "The Horse That Could Whistle 'Dixie'"
- "The Captain's Tiger"
- "A Dime a Throw"
- "My Father Sits in the Dark"
- "Good Man, Bad Man"
- "Slipping Beauty"
- "Shoe-shine"
- "The Night I Met Einstein"
- "Monsoon"
- "The Tuxedos"

=== Theatre ===
- Fiorello! (1959)
- Tenderloin (1960)
- I Can Get It for You Wholesale (1962)
- Duke Ellington's Pousse-Cafe (1966)
- The Mother Lover (1969) one performance
- Asterisk! A comedy of terrors (1969)

=== Film and television ===
- House of Strangers (1949) based upon the novel "I'll Never Go There Any More" (1941) by Jerome Weidman
- The Damned Don't Cry (1950)
- Invitation (1952) based on Weidman's short story "R.S.V.P."
- The Eddie Cantor Story (1953)
- Broken Lance (1949) based upon the novel "I'll Never Go There Any More" (1941)
- "Wanted: Poor Boy" (1955) (TV episode of Star Tonight)
- Slander (1956)
- "The Hole Card" (1957) (TV episode of Schlitz Playhouse of Stars)
- "All I Survey" (1958) (TV episode of General Electric Theater)
- The Big Show (1961) based upon the novel "I'll Never Go There Any More" (1941)
- The Reporter (1964) with Harry Guardino

=== Essays ===
- Letter of Credit
- Traveler's Cheque
- Back Talk
