= Jacques Mersereau =

Set decorator

- Occupation: Set decorator
- Years active: 1943-1944

Jacques Mersereau was a set decorator. He was nominated for an Academy Award in Best Art Direction for the film Thousands Cheer. He was also credited as a set decorator for The White Cliffs of Dover.

== Selected filmography ==
- Thousands Cheer (1943)
- The White Cliffs of Dover (1944)
