= Marilyn Cooper =

American actress

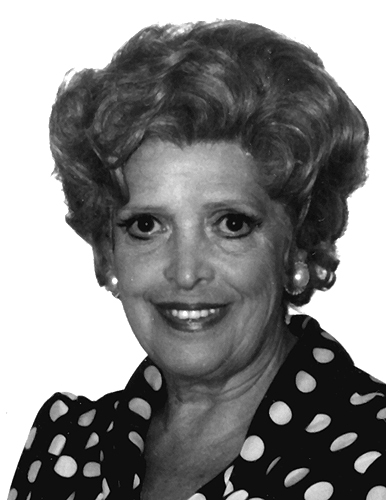
- In Bye Bye Birdie (1991)
- Born: December 14, 1934; New York City, New York, U.S.
- Died: April 22, 2009 (aged 74); Englewood, New Jersey, U.S.
- Occupation: Actress
- Years active: 1956–2000

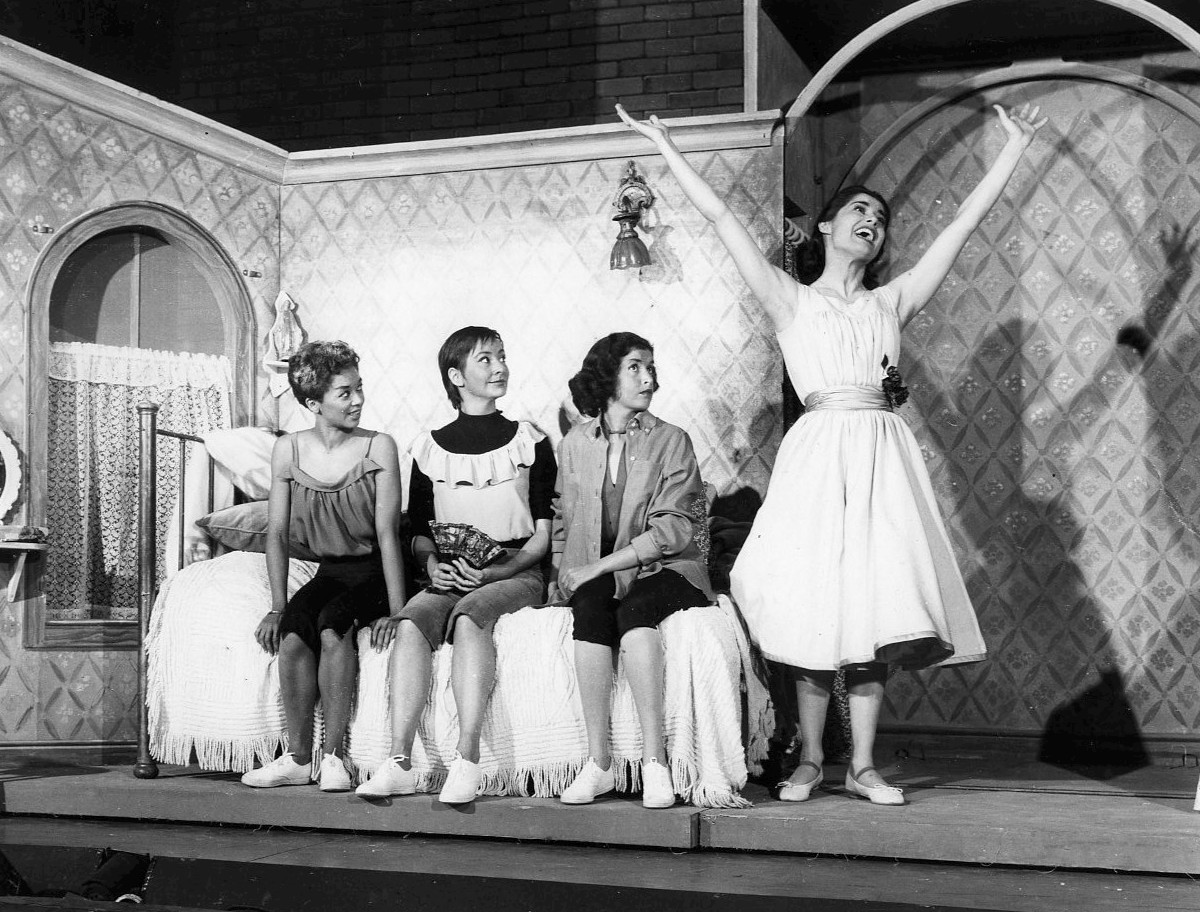
L-R: Elizabeth Taylor, Carmen Gutierrez, Marilyn Cooper, and Carol Lawrence from the original Broadway cast of West Side Story sing "I Feel Pretty" (1957)

Marilyn Cooper (December 14, 1934 – April 22, 2009) was an American actress known primarily for her work on the Broadway stage.

== Life and career ==
Cooper was born to Ashkenazi Jewish parents, Benjamin Cooper and Edna Becker in New York City. Cooper's great aunt was the Vaudeville star Belle Baker. Cooper stated that she was inspired by her aunt's career.

Cooper made her Broadway debut in 1956 in the chorus of Mr. Wonderful. Next she was in the chorus of a revival of Brigadoon.

In 1957, she played Rosalia, a Sharks girl who wants to go back to Puerto Rico ("Puerto Rico, you lovely island"), in the original Broadway production of West Side Story. In 1959, she went on to create the ensemble role of Agnes, the leader of the Hollywood Blondes, in the original Broadway production Gypsy. Before leaving the show, she briefly understudied the title role of Louise and played the part for one performance without having had an opportunity to rehearse Act 2. In 1962, she graduated to a leading role, playing the ingenue in I Can Get It for You Wholesale, opposite Elliott Gould and Sheree North (the show marked Barbra Streisand's Broadway debut at age 19).

Cooper enjoyed a long career in New York, appearing on Broadway in Hallelujah, Baby!; Golden Rainbow (understudying and going on for Eydie Gorme); Mame (succeeding Helen Gallagher as Agnes Gooch towards the end of the original Broadway run); Two by Two, starring Danny Kaye and Madeline Kahn; the 1971 revival of On the Town as Lucy Schmeeler, the blind date; and in Michael Bennett's Ballroom, starring Dorothy Loudon.

In 1981, Cooper created the supporting role of Jan Donovan, the wife of Tess Harding's ex-husband Larry, in the Lauren Bacall vehicle Woman of the Year. Although she sang only one song, "The Grass Is Always Greener" (a duet with Lauren Bacall's character Tess), she effectively stole the show and won critical and popular acclaim, along with the Tony Award for Best Featured Actress in a Musical and the Drama Desk Award for Outstanding Featured Actress in a Musical for her performance. Cooper toured the United States with Bacall in the national tour of Woman of the Year that followed its successful Broadway run. She also reprised her role of Jan Donovan in the national touring production of Woman of the Year, starring Barbara Eden, from April 3, 1984, until September 16, 1984. In 1985, Cooper appeared in Neil Simon's female version of The Odd Couple. The following season she had a memorable vocal cameo as a radio actress in Simon's Broadway Bound, which starred Linda Lavin.

Cooper can be heard on the original Broadway cast recordings of West Side Story, I Can Get It for You Wholesale, Two by Two, and Woman of the Year. Additionally she appeared in Fiorello!, One Touch of Venus, and Do Re Mi at New York City Center's "Encores!" series.

Cooper's television appearances include Alice, where she was reunited with Linda Lavin (singing "It's All in the Game"), Kate and Allie, Cheers (as Lilith Sternin's mother Betty), Law & Order, The Nanny and Caroline in the City. She also had a featured role with Tony Roberts and Kelly Bishop in the short-lived television series, The Thorns.

== Death ==
Cooper died on April 22, 2009, at the Actors Fund Home in Englewood, New Jersey, following a long illness.

== Broadway credits ==
- Mr. Wonderful (1956)
- Brigadoon (1957, revival)
- West Side Story (1957)
- Gypsy (1959)
- I Can Get It for You Wholesale (1961)
- West Side Story (1964 revival)
- Hallelujah, Baby! (1967)
- Golden Rainbow (1968)
- Mame (joined cast in December 1969)
- Two by Two (1970)
- On the Town (1971, revival)
- Working (1978)
- Ballroom (1978)
- Woman of the Year (musical) (1981)
- The Odd Couple (1985, revival, female version)
- Broadway Bound (1986)
- Cafe Crown (1989, revival)
- Grease (1994, revival)
