= Paul Mersereau (painter) =

American painter

Paul Fontaine Mersereau (1873 in Rheims, France – ??) was a French painter. He emigrated to Shreveport, Louisiana, after studying at the Académie Julian in Paris with Jean-Joseph Benjamin-Constant and also with George Inness, and also spent time in Texas. He crossed the US exhibiting his work.

Mersereau was President of the Southern National Academy of Design until 1933 when succeeded by Nan Sheets, and a member of the Society of American Artists. His work is included in numerous public collections in Arkansas, Mississippi, and Louisiana.

== Further reading and sources ==
- Dunbier, Lonnie Pierson, The Artists Bluebook 2005.
- Falk, Peter Hastings, "Who Was Who in American Art 1564-1975" Madison, CT, Sound View Press 1999.
