= Goddard Lieberson =

American recording executive (1911–1977)

- Goddard circa 1950
- Born: April 5, 1911; Hanley, Staffordshire, England, UK
- Died: May 29, 1977 (aged 66); New York City, U.S.
- Years active: 1949–1977
- Spouse: Vera Zorina (m. 1946)
- Children: 2, including Peter Lieberson

Goddard Lieberson (April 5, 1911 – May 29, 1977) was the president of Columbia Records from 1956 to 1971, and again from 1973 to 1975. He became president of the Recording Industry Association of America in 1964. He was also a composer, and studied with George Frederick McKay, at the University of Washington, Seattle. He married Vera Zorina in 1946 and with her had 2 children.

== Biography ==
Lieberson was born to a Jewish family on April 5, 1911, in Hanley in Staffordshire; his father was a manufacturer of rubber shoe heels who took his family to the United States when Lieberson was a child. He studied classical piano and composition at the Eastman School of Music in the 1930s and after graduating he wrote classical concert reviews under the pseudonym "Johann Sebastian". He was married to actress/dancer Vera Zorina from 1946 until his death in 1977. They had two sons: Peter Lieberson, a composer, and Jonathan Lieberson. Lieberson was noted for his personal elegance, taste and style, and was renowned as a wit, bon vivant and international traveller, whose circle of friends and acquaintances included Jacqueline Kennedy Onassis, Richard Rodgers, W. Somerset Maugham, Noël Coward and John Gielgud.

Lieberson began working for the CBS group of labels in 1938 – the same year the company was acquired by the CBS broadcasting empire – and he began his career at Columbia as an A&R Manager. Before becoming president of the company, Lieberson was responsible for Columbia's introduction of the long-playing record. The LP was particularly well-suited to Columbia's long-established classical repertoire, as recorded by the Philadelphia Orchestra under Eugene Ormandy and the New York Philharmonic Orchestra conducted by Artur Rodziński, Dimitri Mitropoulos, and Leonard Bernstein. Lieberson was also a lifelong friend of musician, recording artist, TV personality and Columbia A&R manager/producer Mitch Miller, having met Miller when the two were studying music at the Eastman School of Music in the 1930s

He was promoted to president of Columbia Records from 1956 to 1971 and again from 1973 to 1975. In 1957, Temple University awarded him an honorary Doctor of Music degree. In 1966, in a reorganization, Columbia Records became subsidiary to the newly formed CBS/Columbia Group. In 1967, Lieberson promoted Clive Davis to president of Columbia Records.

In 1977, Lieberson co-wrote and produced the CBS-TV special They Said it with Music: From Yankee Doodle to Ragtime, a salute to American songwriters throughout the ages, starring Bernadette Peters, Tony Randall, Jason Robards, Jean Stapleton and Flip Wilson, with appearances by Thurl Ravenscroft and Jimmy Griffin, a founding member of the soft-rock band Bread. The show aired July 4, thirty-seven days after Lieberson died of cancer in New York City on May 29, 1977, aged 66.

== Positions ==
Preceded by	President of Columbia Records/CBS Records; 1956 to 1971	Succeeded by Clive Davis
Preceded by	President of RIAA; 1964 to 1977	Succeeded by
Preceded by Clive Davis	President of CBS Records; 1973 to 1975	Succeeded by Walter Yetnikoff
