= Harold Rome =

American composer, lyricist, and writer for musical theater

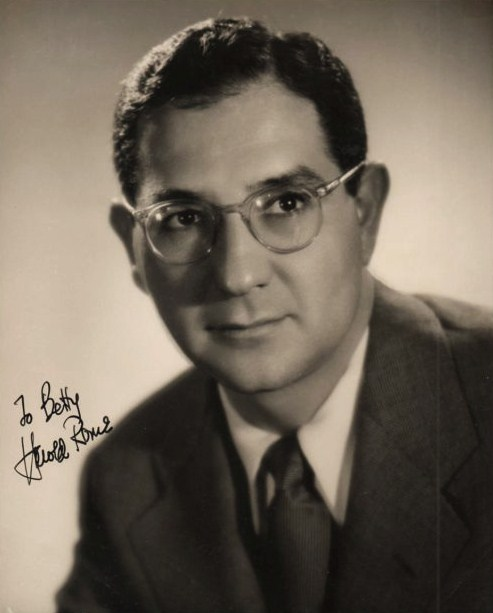
- Rome in 1950
- Born: Harold Jacob Rome; May 27, 1908; Hartford, Connecticut, U.S.
- Died: October 26, 1993 (aged 85); New York City, New York, U.S.
- Occupations: Composer, lyricist, writer

Harold Jacob "Hecky" Rome (May 27, 1908 – October 26, 1993) was an American composer, lyricist, and writer for musical theater.

== Biography ==
Rome was born in Hartford, Connecticut and graduated from Hartford Public High School. Originally, he chose to go to Trinity College, but transferred because he felt like a "townie." Rome played piano in local dance bands such as Eddie Wittstein's and was already writing music while studying architecture and law at Yale University. While at Yale, he also pledged to Tau Epsilon Phi. He graduated in 1929 with a Bachelor of Arts, and continued into Yale Law School.

After graduation, he worked as an architect in New York City, but continued to pursue his musical interests, arranging music for local bands, and writing material for revues at Green Mansions, a Jewish summer resort in the Adirondacks. Much of the music Rome was writing at this time was socially conscious and of little interest to Tin Pan Alley.

In 1937, he made his Broadway debut as co-writer, composer, and lyricist of the topical revue Pins and Needles, which was originally written for a small theatrical production directed by Samuel Roland. After a two-week professional run, it was adapted for performances by members of the then-striking International Ladies' Garment Workers' Union (ILGWU) as entertainment for its members.

As Roland was associated with left-wing causes, he was asked by ILGWU president David Dubinsky to withdraw. The show was a huge success, running for 1108 performances, and prompted George S. Kaufman and Moss Hart to invite Rome to collaborate on another topical revue, Sing Out the News, in 1938.

In 1949, he wrote the English lyrics of the French song "Mais qu’est-ce que j’ai?". The title song became "What Can I Do?" and the song was recorded by Madelyn Russell with Mitch Miller and his Orchestra.

During World War II, Rome wrote English lyrics to a tune composed by the Soviet Dmitri Shostakovitch. The song was titled "United Nations on the March" and served as the unofficial anthem of the Allied Powers in World War II.

In the early 1940s, Rome wrote songs for several revues and shows, but it was not until after the end of World War II that he had his next real success with Call Me Mister. His first full-fledged musical was Wish You Were Here in 1952.

Additional Broadway credits include Fanny (1954), Destry Rides Again (1959), I Can Get It for You Wholesale (1962), in which Barbra Streisand made her Broadway debut, and The Zulu and the Zayda (1965), which dealt with racial and religious intolerance. He also wrote the lyrics for La Grosse Valise (composer Gérard Calvi), which enjoyed a short run at the 54th Street Theater in 1965.

In 1970, he wrote a musical adaptation of Gone with the Wind entitled Scarlett for a Tokyo production with a Japanese cast. It later was staged in English with little success in London and Los Angeles.

Rome's music and/or lyrics can be heard in such films as Babes on Broadway (1941), Thousands Cheer (1943), Anchors Aweigh (1945), and Rear Window (1954).

In 1991, Rome was presented with a special Drama Desk Award for his "distinctive contribution to musical theater". Later that same year, he was inducted into the American Theater Hall of Fame.

Rome died of a stroke in New York City at the age of 85.

== Works ==
=== Shows ===
- 1937: Pins and Needles
- 1940: The Little Dog Laughed
- 1946: Call Me Mister
- 1948: That's the Ticket (Phila.)
- 1950: Bless You All
- 1952: Wish You Were Here
- 1954: Fanny
- 1959: Destry Rides Again
- 1962: I Can Get It for You Wholesale
- 1965: The Zulu and the Zayda
- 1973: Gone With the Wind (not NY)

=== Songs ===
- 1939: "Gee, But I’d Like to Be a G-Man"
- 1939: "Who's Gonna Investigate the Man Who Investigates Me?" (first sung by Zero Mostel)
- 1945: "(All of a Sudden) My Heart Sings" (from the French song "Ma Mie" by Henri Laurent Herpin; English lyric by Harold Rome), sung by Kathryn Grayson in the 1945 film Anchors Aweigh. Versions by Johnnie Johnston and by Martha Stewart were hits in 1945 reaching numbers 7 and 12 respectively in the Billboard chart.
- 1962: "Miss Marmelstein" and "Who Knows?" from I Can Get It for You Wholesale
